= List of military leaders in the American Revolutionary War =

The list of military leaders in the War of American Independence includes those in the forces of the United States; those in the forces of Great Britain, which fought without European allies, but with Hessian auxiliaries; and, as the war widened to an international conflict after 1778 to a war between European powers, the list includes leaders in the forces of the U.S. ally France, and France's ally Spain. This is a compilation of some of the most important leaders among the many participants in the war, including Native Americans. The British counted on the colonists Loyalists fighting in the American Revolution to aid the king's cause, but the numbers were below what they had expected.

In order to be listed here an individual must satisfy one of the following criteria:

- Was a nation's top civilian responsible for directing military affairs
- Held a commission of at least brigadier general or rear admiral in an organized military during the conflict
- Was the highest-ranking member of a given nation's force that participated in the conflict (if that rank was not at least major general)
- Was the highest-ranking member of a given state/colonial militia
- Was a provincial or territorial governor who is documented to have directed a military action
- Was a Native American tribal leader who had a documented leadership position in military action

Some individuals held concurrent positions in more than one organization, and a number of Continental Army generals also held high-ranking positions in their state militia organizations. Many U.S. combatants were militiamen, not regular troops. Militia are defined as being a part of the organized armed forces of a country liable to call only in emergency or a body of citizens organized for military service.

== United States ==
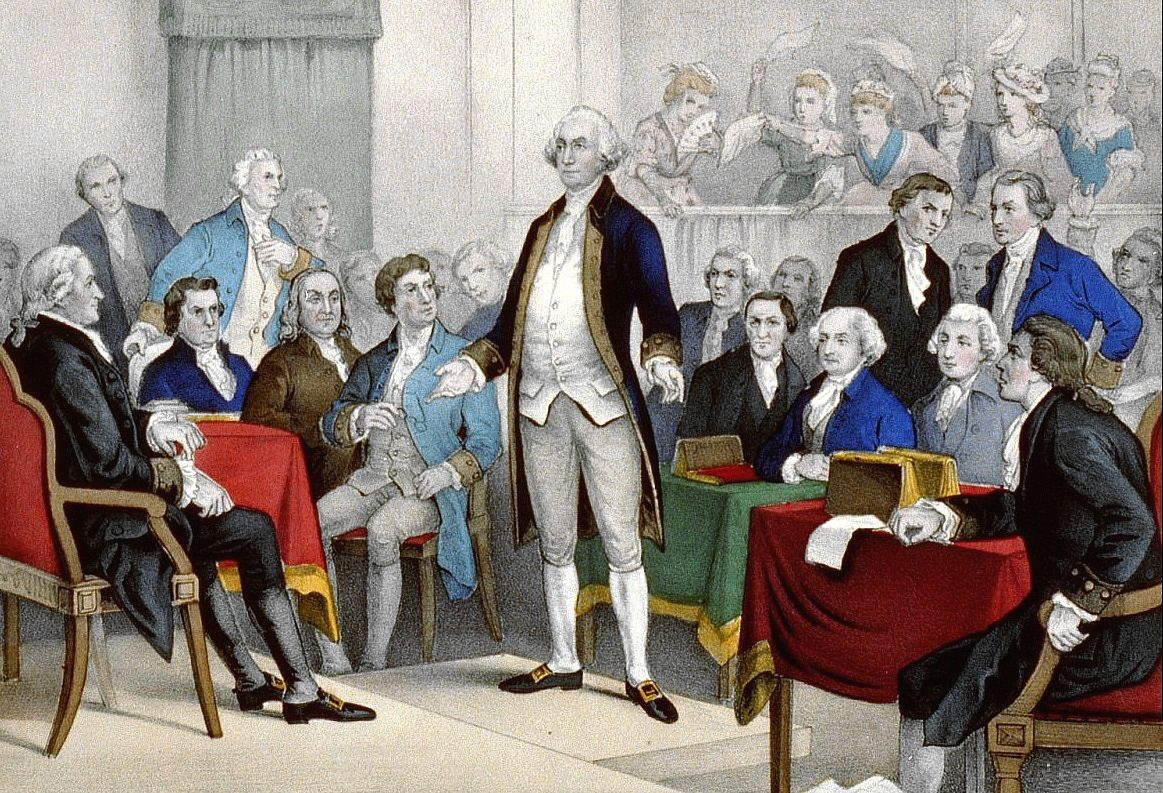
Second Continental Congress appoints George Washington commander-in-chief of the newly established Continental Army

Seal of the Board of War and Ordnance, the administrative entity appointed by the Continental Congress to oversee the Continental Army

When armed hostilities began between colonial insurgents and the British Army began outside of Boston, Massachusetts in April 1775, there was no unified colonial army, but rather local militias in each colony. The Second Continental Congress, the elective body from each of the Thirteen Colonies, established the Continental Army in June 1775. It appointed Virginian George Washington as commander-in-chief. The Continental Congress established a standing committee, the Board of War and Ordnance, to function like the British Ministry of War. The board's official seal has military symbolism but also the Phrygian cap of freedom. The Continental Army was established as a regular standing army, with regiments recruited from each state (former colonies), with artillery and cavalry regiments with men from different states.

=== General and Commander-in-chief ===
| Name | Period of service in the rank, promotions and previous military experience. Termination of service | Commentary |
|---|---|---|
| George Washington | June 15, 1775 to Dec. 23, 1783. Member of the Second Continental Congress. Former Colonel of the Virginia Regiment in the French and Indian War. Resigned at the end of the war. | George Washington was the commander-in-chief of the Continental Army, reporting to the Second Continental Congress. His activities, including command of the Main Army, the direction of the overall war effort on behalf of the United States, and administration of the entire army, were overseen by the Board of War, established in June 1776. He held the rank of general during the war. He was subsequently appointed lieutenant general in 1798 and was posthumously promoted to General of the Armies of the United States in 1976. |

=== Continental Army ===
==== Major generals in chronological order ====
| Name | Period of service in the rank, promotions and previous military experience. Termination of service | Commentary |
|---|---|---|
| Artemas Ward | June 17, 1775 to April 23, 1776. General and Commander-in-Chief of the Massachusetts troops. Resigned officially due to "want of health", but really did not want to leave Boston after the British evacuation. | The first overall leader of the assembled militia forces outside Boston after the war began, and ranked second in seniority to Washington in the Continental Army. He commanded the Eastern Department, which was largely responsible for containing the British at Newport, until 1777, when he resigned due to poor health |
| Charles Lee | June 17, 1775 to January 10, 1780. Half-pay Lieutenant Colonel in the British Army, formerly of the 103rd Foot. Dismissed by Congress. | An experienced British military officer, Lee had hoped to be appointed commander-in-chief instead of Washington. He was a somewhat difficult subordinate of Washington's, delaying execution of orders or deliberately flouting them at times. During the retreat across New Jersey from New York, Lee was captured by the British in a surprise raid. Quickly exchanged, he participated in the Philadelphia campaign. After he was convicted by a court martial for disobeying orders during the Battle of Monmouth, he resigned from the army in 1780. |
| Philip Schuyler | June 19, 1775 to April 19, 1779. Member of the Second Continental Congress. Resigned due to a dispute with Horatio Gates. | As head of the Northern Department, Schuyler planned the 1775 invasion of Quebec, but was prevented from leading it by an illness. He was active in the defense of New York in 1777, but the withdrawal from Ticonderoga led Congress to replace him with Horatio Gates. He was also active in Indian relations, cultivating the neutrality or support of tribes in New York. |
| Israel Putnam | June 19, 1775 to June 3, 1783. Promoted from colonel of the 3rd Connecticut Regiment. Resigned officially at the end of the war. However, his active service ended in December 1779 due to a stroke. | Active from the first days of the revolution, Putnam led the forces in the field at the Battle of Bunker Hill. After performing poorly in the Battle of Long Island, Washington assigned him to do primarily recruiting in the Highlands Department. He suffered a stroke in 1779, which ended his military career. |
| Richard Montgomery | Dec. 9, 1775 to Dec. 31, 1775. (Brigadier General June 22, 1775). Former Captain in the 17th Foot. Killed in action during the Battle of Quebec. | Leading the Invasion of Canada in 1775 as a brigadier, Montgomery was killed in the Battle of Quebec, without knowing that he had been promoted to major general following the Siege of Fort St. Jean. |
| John Thomas | March 6, 1776 to June 2, 1776. (Brigadier General June 22, 1775). Lieutenant General of Massachusetts Militia. Died from smallpox during the retreat from Canada. | Active from the beginning of the war in Boston, Thomas commanded the besieging forces at Roxbury. Sent to take over the forces besieging Quebec City, he died of smallpox during the army's retreat in June 1776. |
| William Heath | Aug. 9, 1776 to Nov. 3, 1783. (Brigadier General June 22, 1775). Major General of Massachusetts Militia. | Having a prominent role training troops in the early days of the war at the Siege of Boston, Heath spent most of the war leading the Highland Department, since Washington was apparently not confident of his ability in the field. |
| Horatio Gates | May 16, 1776 to Nov. 3, 1783. (Brigadier General June 17, 1775). Half-pay Major in the British Army, formerly of the Royal American Regiment. | Served at first as Washington's adjutant, and then in the Northern Department. He was in command during the pivotal battle of Saratoga in 1777, following which he lobbied Congress as a potential replacement for Washington. He was afterward given command of the Southern Department, where his army was disastrously defeated at Camden in 1780, ending his field leadership. |
| Joseph Spencer | Aug. 9, 1776 to Jan. 13, 1778. (Brigadier General June 22, 1775 from Colonel of 2nd Connecticut Regiment). Resigned because Congress had ordered an investigation of his military conduct. | |
| John Sullivan | Aug. 9, 1776 to Nov. 30, 1779. (Brigadier General June 22, 1775 when member of the Second Continental Congress). Resigned due to ill health. | Active from the first days of the war, he led a relief column and ended up in command of the invasion of Quebec during its final weeks in 1776. He then served under Washington in New York, New Jersey, and Pennsylvania. He led American forces in the failed Battle of Rhode Island, and then led the 1779 Sullivan Expedition, which destroyed Indian villages in New York. |
| Nathanael Greene | Aug. 9, 1776 to Nov. 3, 1783. (Brigadier General June 22, 1775). Brigadier General of Rhode Island troops. | One of the best strategists in the Continental Army. He served under Washington in New York, New Jersey, and Pennsylvania, and served for a time as the army's Quartermaster General. He led the ultimately successful campaign in 1780 and 1781 against the British "Southern Strategy" as commander of the Southern Department, effectively becoming the Continental Army's number two general. |
| Benedict Arnold | Feb. 17, 1777 to Sept 25, 1780. (Brigadier General Jan. 10, 1776 from Colonel of 20th Continental Regiment). Deserted to the British. | A leading force in the early days of the war, participating in the 1775 capture of Fort Ticonderoga and the invasion of Quebec. He played a crucial role in the 1777 Battles of Saratoga, in which he was severely wounded. In 1780, he acquired command of the Highlands Department with the intent of surrendering West Point to the British. The plot was uncovered and he fled to join the British, for whom he served until the end of 1781 as a brigadier general. |
| William Alexander | Feb. 19, 1777 to Jan. 15, 1783. (Brigadier General March 1, 1776 from Colonel of 1st New Jersey Regiment). Died in active service. | Spending most of the war with the Main Army under Washington, he was captured during the Battle of Long Island in 1776 and not long after that, exchanged for Montfort Browne. He also served with distinction in numerous battles in New Jersey. He died in 1783 shortly before the end of the war. |
| Thomas Mifflin | Feb. 19, 1777 to Feb. 25, 1779. (Brigadier General May 16, 1776 from Quartermaster General with rank of colonel). Resigned when under investigation by Congress for his actions as Quartermaster General. | Serving in a variety of roles during and after the American Revolution, several of which qualify him to be counted among the Founding Fathers. He was the first Governor of Pennsylvania, serving from 1790 to 1799; he was also the last President of Pennsylvania, succeeding Benjamin Franklin and serving from 1788 until 1790. |
| Arthur St. Clair | Feb. 19, 1777 to Nov. 3, 1783. (Brigadier General Aug. 9, 1776 from Colonel of 2nd Pennsylvania Battalion). | Leading troops during the Quebec, New York, and New Jersey campaigns, and then put in command of Fort Ticonderoga, where he made the critical decision to retreat before Burgoyne's advancing army. Publicly criticized for this step, which saved his army, he held no more field commands, but served as an aide to Washington for the rest of the war. |
| Adam Stephen | Feb. 19, 1777 to Feb. 25, 1777. (Brigadier General Sep. 4, 1776 from Colonel of 4th Virginia Regiment). Court-martialed and cashiered for drunkenness and firing on friendly troops at the battle of Germantown. | Leading forces under Washington in the New York, New Jersey, and Philadelphia campaigns. Following a misstep in the Battle of Germantown in which, against orders, he advanced his troops to a point where they accidentally exchanged friendly fire with forces of Anthony Wayne, Stephen was court martialed and cashiered out of the army. |
| Benjamin Lincoln | Feb. 19, 1777 to Oct. 29, 1783. Commissioned from major general of Massachusetts Militia. | Present at three major surrenders during the war. Active in the New York campaign, Washington sent him to assist Horatio Gates in the Northern Department, where he was wounded after the Battle of Bemis Heights. Next he was put in command of the Southern Department, he was forced to surrender his army to Sir Henry Clinton when they were surrounded in Charleston in 1780. Exchanged later that year, he was present at the Siege of Yorktown where, as second-in-command to Washington, he accepted Cornwallis' sword, which Cornwallis had sent his second-in-command to deliver. From 1781 to 1783 he served as Secretary at War. |
| Gilbert du Motier, Marquis de Lafayette | July 31, 1777 to Nov. 3, 1783. Captain in the French Régiment de Noailles dragons. | Serving with Washington in the Philadelphia campaign, he fought in the Battle of Rhode Island, and successfully resisted significant engagements with British forces in Virginia before the armies of Washington and Rochambeau arrived. He was a favorite of Washington's, who treated him like a son. |
| Philip De Coudray | Aug. 11, 1777 to Sept. 15, 1777. Chef de brigade in the French Corps-Royal d'artillerie. Died in a riding accident. | |
| Johann de Kalb | Sept. 15, 1777 to Aug. 19, 1780. Former Captain and lieutenant colonel by brevet in the French Régiment d'Anhalt. Died of wounds received in the battle of Camden. | Serving under Washington at Valley Forge, he was sent to the Southern Department with Horatio Gates when he took over that department. |
| Robert Howe | Oct. 20, 1777 to Nov. 3, 1783. (Brigadier General March 1, 1776 from Colonel of 2nd North Carolina Regiment). | Commanding the Southern Department, he led a campaign against East Florida that failed due to disagreements with state militia commanders, and was forced to surrender Savannah. He then served under Anthony Wayne in the Highlands Department, seeing action at Stony Point, and under Washington in the Main Army, where he put down a mutiny in 1781. |
| Alexander McDougall | Oct. 20, 1777 to Nov. 3, 1783. (Brigadier General Aug. 9, 1776.) Former Colonel of 1st New York Regiment). | Active in the New York and Philadelphia campaigns, he spent most of the war in the Highlands Department under William Heath. |
| Thomas Conway | Dec. 13, 1777 to April 28, 1778. (Brigadier General May 13, 1777). Colonel in the French Régiment d'Anjou. Resigned when he lost his command after the Conway Cabal had been revealed. | Inspector General of the Continental Army. Involved with the Conway Cabal together with Horatio Gates, he later served with Émigré forces during the French Revolutionary War. |
| Friedrich Wilhelm von Steuben | May 15, 1778 to April 15, 1784. (Volunteer Inspector General March 28, 1778.) Former Captain in the Prussian Infantry Regiment von Salmuth. | His military drills and instruction, which included swearing and shouting commands to officers, were especially helpful at Valley Forge, are generally credited with significantly improving the performance of the Continental Army. He served in active roles in the Philadelphia campaign, and under Nathanael Greene in his southern campaign, before returning to Washington's army at Yorktown. He authored Regulations for the Order and Discipline of the Troops of the United States, the United States Army's training guide until the War of 1812. At President Washington's request, he created a blueprint for the future of the U.S. Military, including the establishment, framework, and curriculum for America's service academies, starting with West Point. |
| William Smallwood | Sept. 15, 1780 to Nov. 3, 1783. (Brigadier General Oct. 23, 1776 from Colonel of 1st Maryland Regiment). | Served with distinction in the New York campaign and was twice wounded at White Plains. He then served in the Philadelphia campaign, and was in the debacle at Camden in 1780. He also commanded the militia of North Carolina for a few months. |
| Samuel Holden Parsons | Oct. 23, 1780 to July 22, 1782. (Brigadier General Aug. 9, 1776 from Colonel of 10th Continental Regiment.); Dissatisfied and in poor health, he repeatedly asked leave to resign but it was not granted by Congress until the end of hostilities. | |
| Henry Knox | Nov. 15, 1781 to June 20, 1784. (Brigadier General Dec. 27, 1776 from Colonel of Artillery). | Chief artillery officer of the Continental Army. Active with Washington throughout most of the war, he brought Ticonderoga's cannons to Boston in early 1776, and saw the most action from New York to Yorktown. He oversaw the creation of an artillery training centre that was a precursor to the United States Military Academy, and later served as the first United States Secretary of War. Knox initiated the concept of The Society of the Cincinnati, formally organizing the society and authoring its founding document as the war ended in 1783. |
| Louis Lebègue Duportail | Nov. 15, 1781 to June 20, 1784. (Brigadier General Nov. 17, 1777 from Colonel of Engineers). Lieutenant-Colonel in the French Corps royal du genie. | He oversaw the improvement of defenses throughout the states and directed the engineering efforts at Yorktown. |
| William Moultrie | Oct. 15, 1782 to Nov. 3, 1783. (Brigadier General Sept. 16, 1776 from Colonel of 2nd South Carolina Regiment). | |

==== Brigadier generals ====
- John Armstrong Sr. (born Ireland; settled in Pennsylvania). Fought in the French and Indian War; civil engineer; delegate to the Continental Congress.

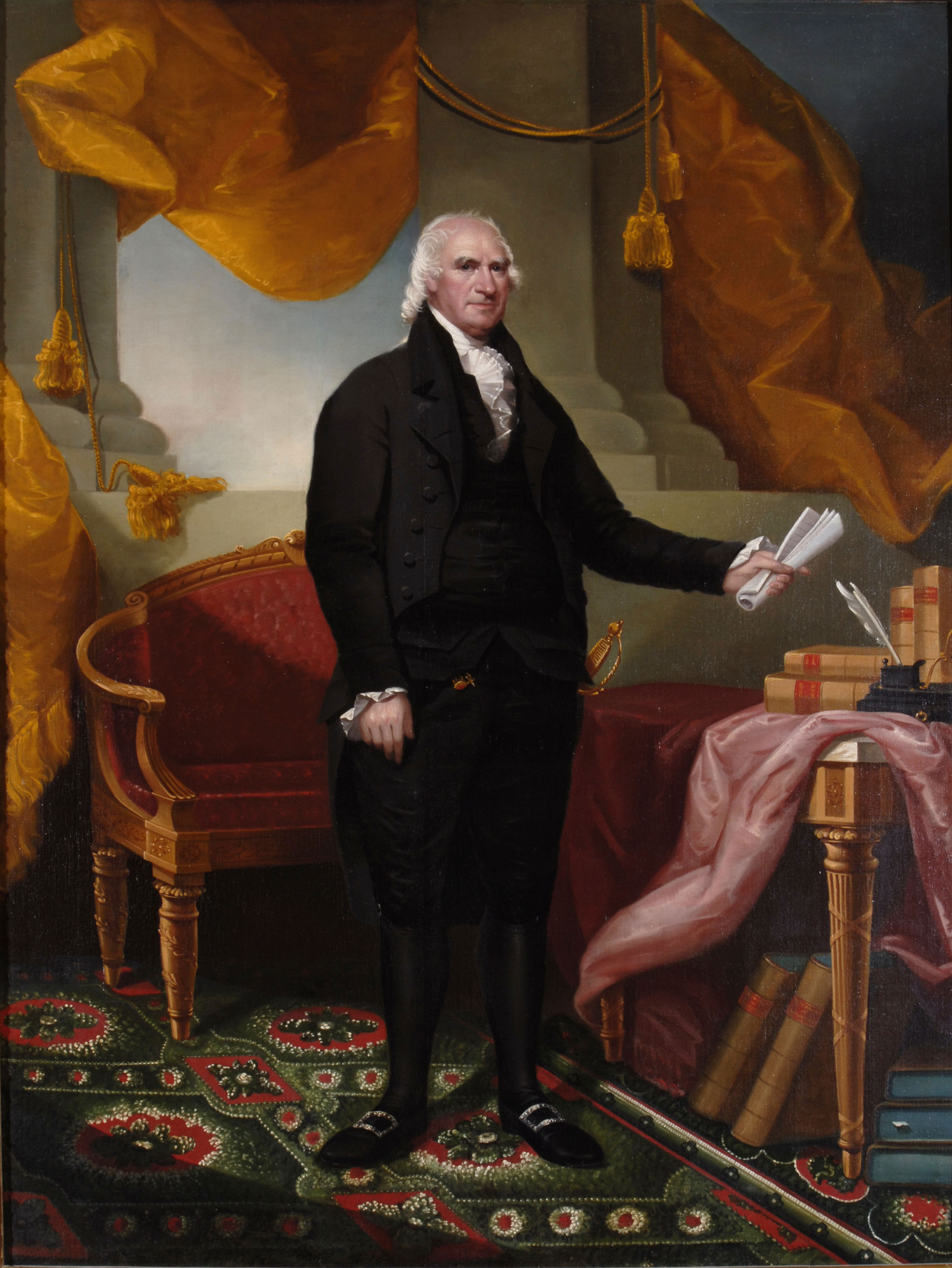
George Clinton

- George Clinton (New York). Fought in the French and Indian War; served as governor of New York simultaneously with his leadership in the war for independence; became 4th vice president of the U.S.
- Amasa Davis (Massachusetts). Began as quartermaster to a Boston regiment. Served with his brother Robert Davis. Amasa and his brother both participated in the Boston Tea Party.
- Elias Dayton (New Jersey). Fought in the French and Indian War and Pontiac's War; father of a signer of the U.S. Constitution
- Joseph Frye (Massachusetts), initially a member of the militia, became a brigadier in the Continental Army, but resigned his commission due to incapacity for active service.

Gadsden Flag designed by Christopher Gadsden

- Christopher Gadsden (South Carolina). Member of the Continental Congress.

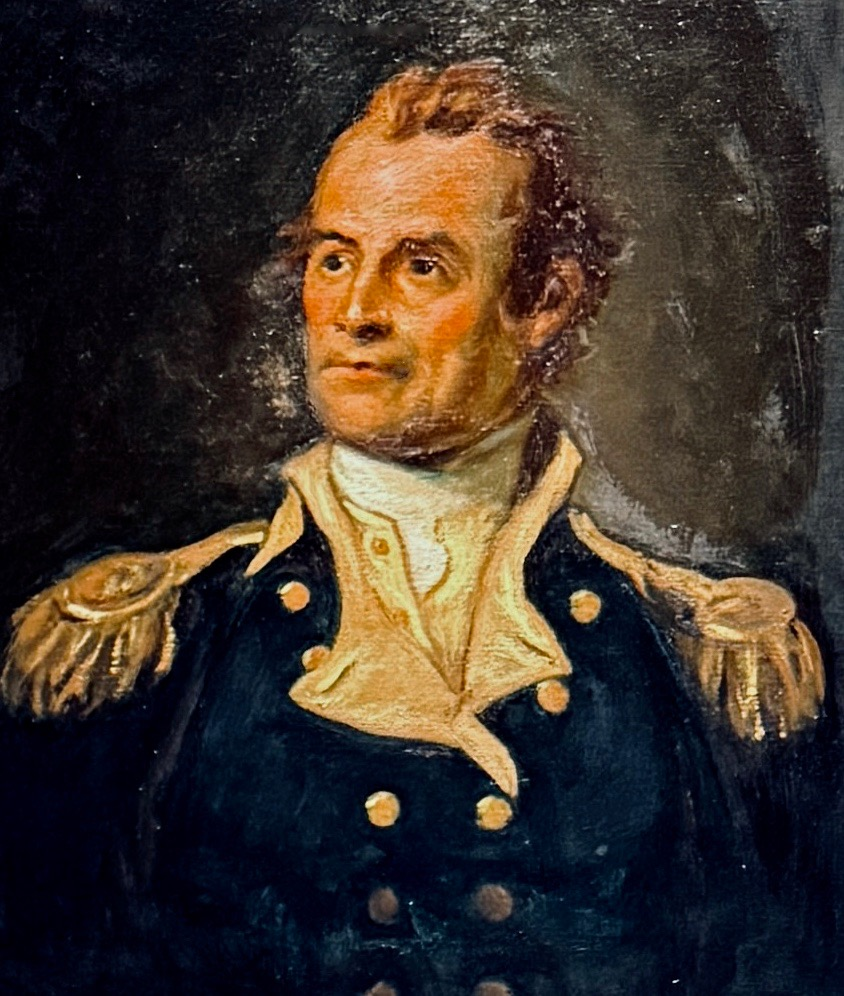
John Glover

- John Glover. (Massachusetts) Famous for helping found what would become the United States Navy, along with his regiment rowing Washington across the Delaware, the Battle of Long Island, and leading one of the first integrated regiments in the American Revolution.
- Mordecai Gist (Maryland) in command of the Maryland Line; served at the Siege of Yorktown.
- John Greaton. (Massachusetts) Continental brigadier general from 7 January 1783 to 3 November 1783. He died less than two months later in Roxbury on December 16, 1783. His widow, Sarah Greaton, wrote to the Continental Congress two years later to request the land grant that her husband was owed be paid out in cash instead. The Continental Congress denied the request in July, 1788.
- John Philip De Haas. (Born Dutch Reoublic, parents settled in Pennsylvania) (brevet to Major General 1780)
- Moses Hazen (Massachusetts). Veteran of the French and Indian War; gained property in Quebec; part of the American invasion of Quebec the revolutionary war.
- James Hogun (POW) (North Carolina Line 1st Brigade)
- Isaac Huger
- Jedediah Huntington
- William Irvine
- Ebenezer Learned
- Andrew Lewis
- Lachlan McIntosh
- George Mathews
- William Maxwell
- Hugh Mercer † Scottish brigadier general in the Continental Army; killed in the Battle of Princeton
- Samuel Meredith (October 1777 he was commissioned General of the 4th Brigade and took part in the Battles of Brandywine and Germantown.)
- James Moore (North Carolina Line 1st Brigade)
- Daniel Morgan (POW)
- Peter Muhlenberg (brevet to major general 1783)
- Francis Nash † (North Carolina Line NC Brigade)
- John Nixon
- Enoch Poor
- Rufus Putnam
- James Reed
- William Thompson
- Charles Scott (POW) (brevet to Major General 1791)
- John Stark (not promoted to major general until 1786)
- Jethro Sumner (North Carolina Line 2nd Brigade)
- Jacobus Swartwout
- James Mitchell Varnum
- Anthony Wayne
- George Weedon
- James Wilkinson (brevet to brigadier in 1777, promoted to major general in 1812)
- Otho Holland Williams
- William Woodford (died as POW)

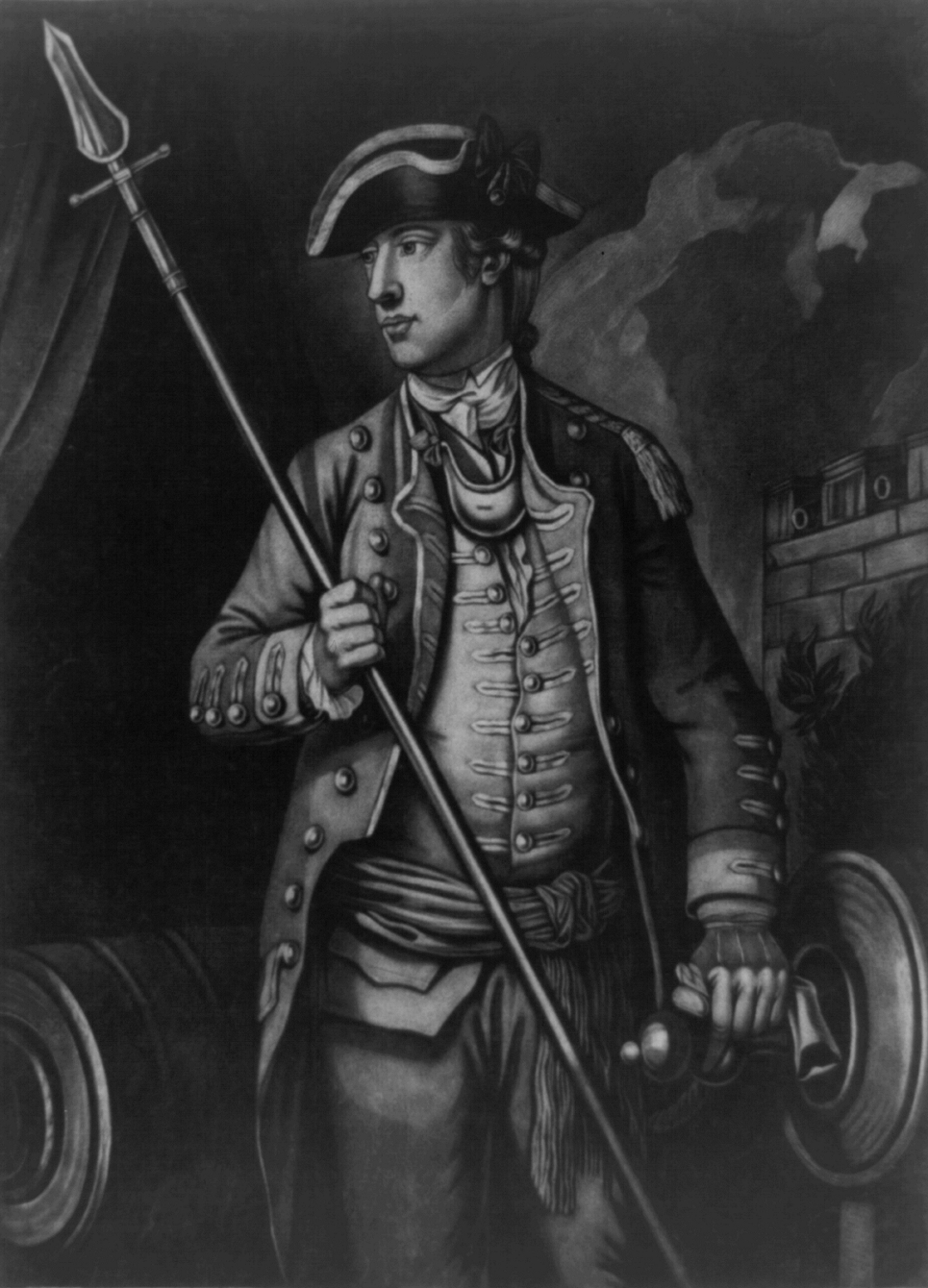
David Wooster

- David Wooster † participated in the Quebec invasion, serving as military governor of Montreal. He led the Canadian Department after the death of Richard Montgomery. Following the retreat from Quebec, he returned to his native Connecticut, where he led the state militia. He was killed in the 1777 Battle of Ridgefield.

=== Foreigner Officers in the Continental Army ===
- Philippe Hubert Preudhomme de Borre
- Louis Lebègue Duportail
- Jean Baptiste Joseph, chevalier de Laumoy (French)
- Johann de Kalb
- Tadeusz Kościuszko
- Michael Kovats †
- Gilbert du Motier, Marquis de Lafayette (French). The most famous foreigner volunteering for the Continental Army.
- Marquis de Chastellux (French)
- Kazimierz Pułaski (Casimir Pulaski) † (Polish)
- Matthias Alexis Roche de Fermoy
- Friedrich Wilhelm von Steuben (Prussian)
- Philippe Charles Tronson du Coudray
- Charles Armand Tuffin, marquis de la Rouërie (French)
- Frederick William, Baron de Woedtke
- Gustav Heinrich von Wetter-Rosenthal, under the name of John Rose (Baltic German from Estonia)

=== Militia leaders by state ===
- Connecticut
  - Gold Selleck Silliman
  - Comfort Hoyt, Sr.
- Delaware
  - Thomas Collins led the Delaware militia following Rodney's resignation, and served as president of the state after the war.

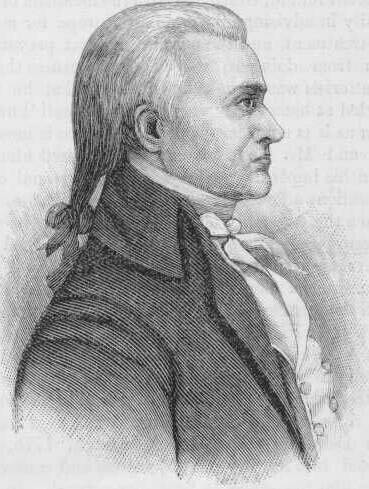
Caesar Rodney

  - Caesar Rodney, signed the Declaration of Independence, and led the Delaware state militia until 1781, when he resigned due to poor health. He was active in suppressing Loyalist dissent, and raising men and provisions for the national effort.
- Georgia
  - Samuel Elbert (Major General of the Georgia militia)
  - James Gunn (Brigadier General in the Georgia militia and U.S Congressman)
- Maryland
  - Thomas Johnson
  - John Stricker
- Massachusetts
  - Oliver Brown Lead the soldiers who took down the statue of King George III in New York City, 1776
  - Timothy Danielson Lead the Hampshire County Militia, was a brigadier general in the Massachusetts Militia throughout the Revolutionary War.
  - John Fellows
  - James Frye Senior Colonel and Commander of the Essex County Militia, known as "Frye's Regiment"; later absorbed into the 10th Massachusetts Regiment (Cambridge Brigade) with Frye as the senior Colonel of the Bridge; was in command of this Brigade at Bunker Hill as the senior militia Colonel in the state of Massachusetts.
  - Samuel McClellan
  - Joseph Palmer
  - Peleg Wadsworth
  - Jonathan Warner Colonel Jonathan Warner's Regiment of Minute Men, commanded by Captain Jonathan Barns, marched from Brookfield, Massachusetts on April 19, 1775 upon news of the British advance on Lexington and Concord.

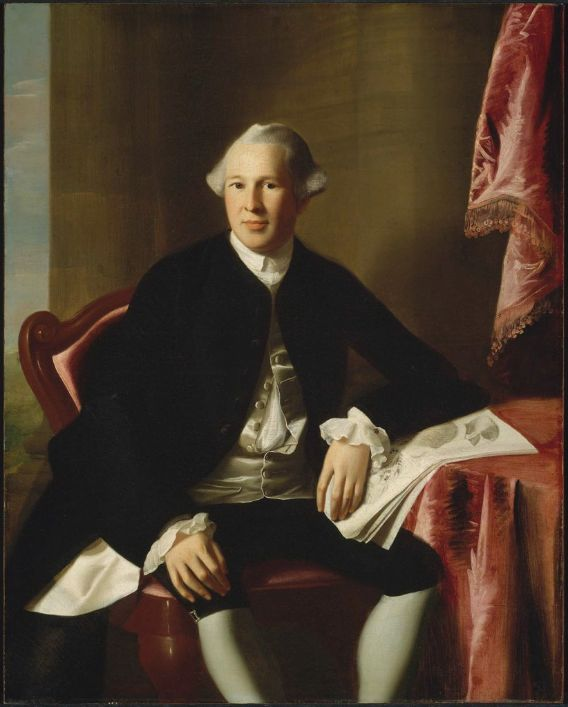
Joseph Warren

  - Joseph Warren † an American physician who played a leading role in American Patriot organizations in Boston in the early days of the American Revolution, eventually serving as President of the revolutionary Massachusetts Provincial Congress. Warren enlisted Paul Revere and William Dawes on April 18, 1775, to leave Boston and spread the alarm that the British garrison in Boston was setting out to raid the town of Concord and arrest rebel leaders John Hancock and Samuel Adams. Warren participated in the next day's Battles of Lexington and Concord. Warren had been commissioned a major general in the colony's militia shortly before the June 17, 1775 Battle of Bunker Hill. Rather than exercising his rank, Warren served in the battle as a private soldier, and was killed in combat when British troops stormed the redoubt atop Breed's Hill.
- New Hampshire
  - Nathaniel Folsom
  - William Whipple
- New Jersey

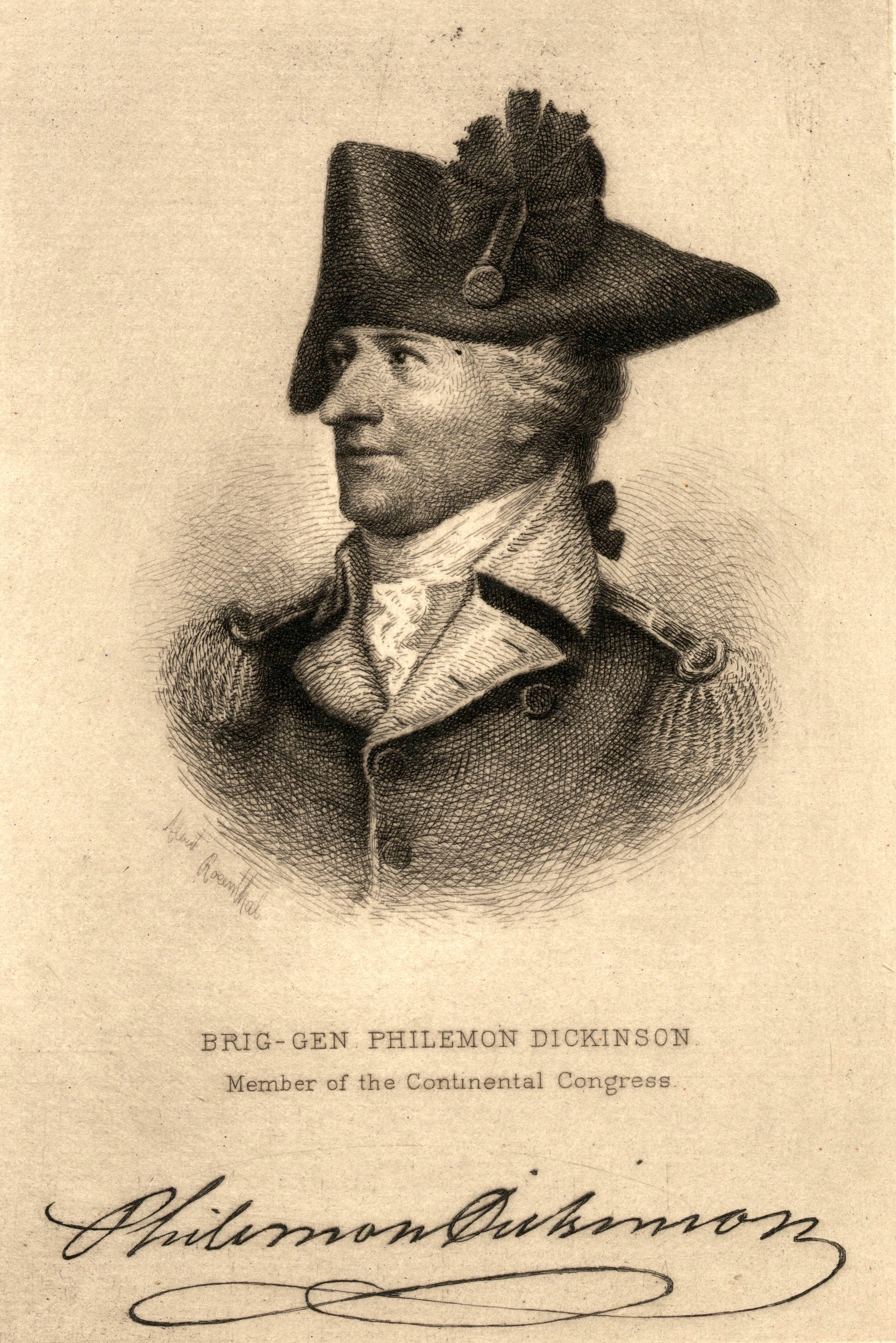
Philemon Dickinson

  - Philemon Dickinson (Major General of New Jersey Militia from 1777 to 1782)
- New York
  - Nathaniel Woodhull
  - John Morin Scott
  - Nicholas Herkimer
- North Carolina
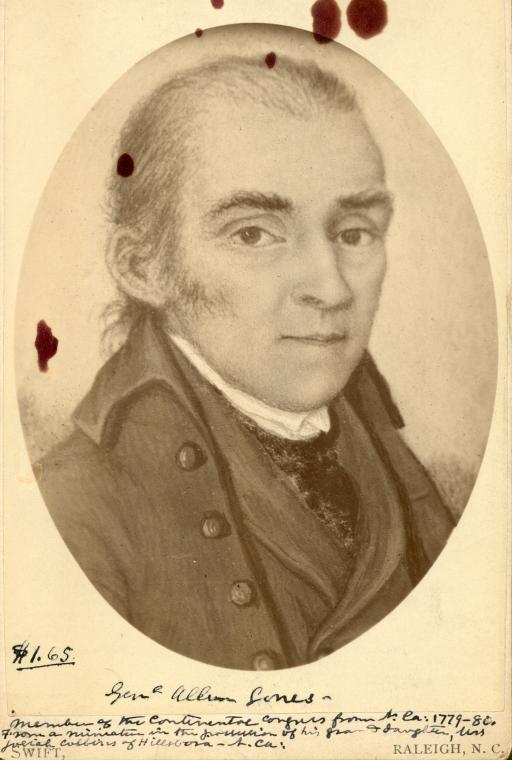
  Brigadier General Allen Jones
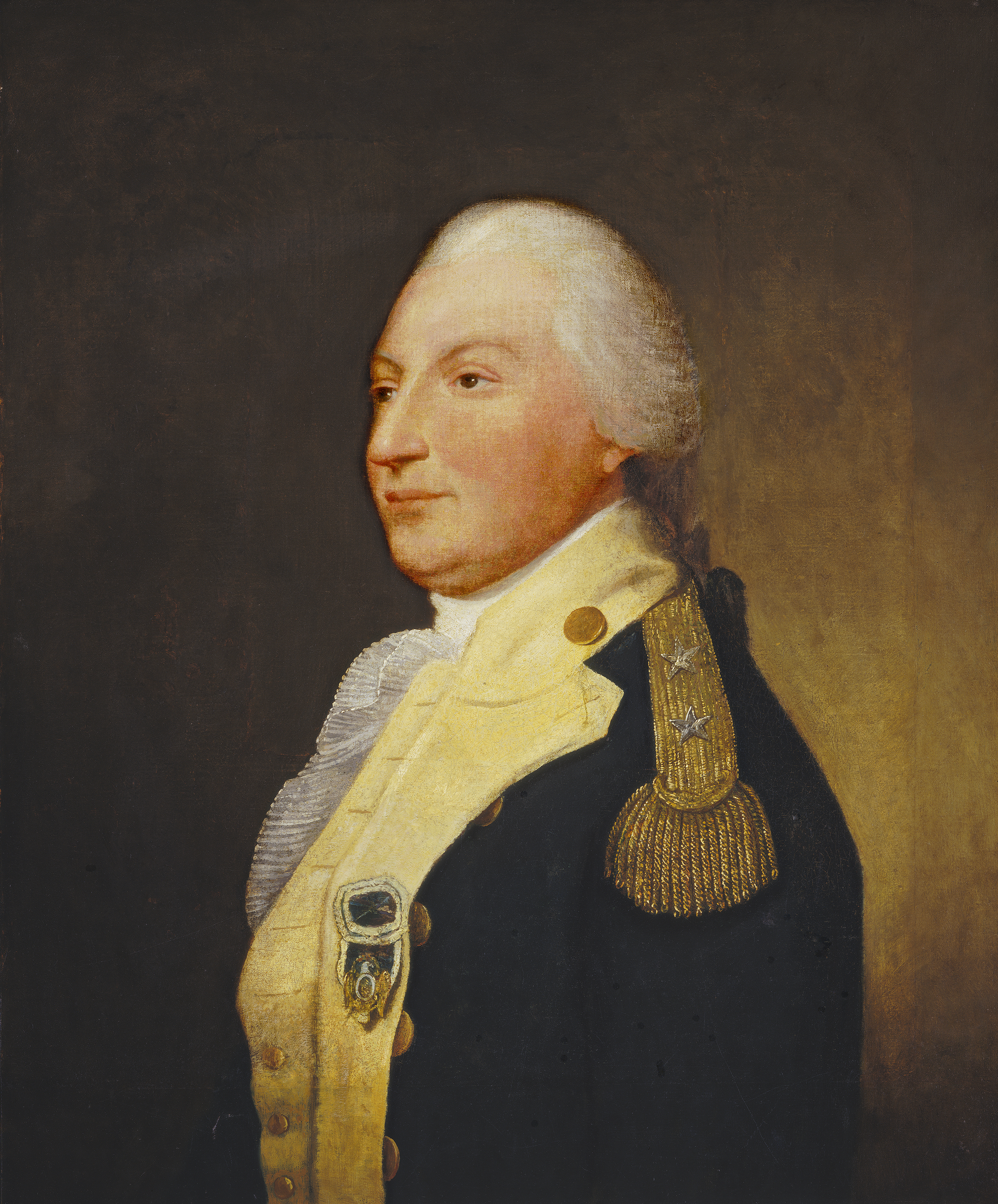
  Major General William Smallwood
  - John Ashe (Brigadier General of the Wilmington District Brigade, Major General of North Carolina Militia and State Troops)
  - William Bryan (Brigadier General of the New Bern District Brigade)
  - John Butler (Brigadier General of the Hillsborough District Brigade
  - Richard Caswell (Colonel of the New Bern District Minutemen and later Brigadier General of New Bern District Brigade)
  - William Caswell (Brigadier General of the New Bern District Brigade)
  - William Lee Davidson (Brigadier General Pro Tempore of Salisbury District Brigade)
  - Thomas Eaton (Brigadier General of the Halifax District Brigade)
  - Isaac Gregory (Brigadier General of the Edenton District Brigade)
  - Henry William Harrington (Brigadier General Pro Tempore of the Salisbury District Brigade)
  - Allen Jones (Brigadier General of Halifax District Brigade)
  - James Kenan (Brigadier General Pro Tempore of the Wilmington District Brigade)
  - Alexander Lillington (Brigadier General of Wilmington District Brigade)
  - Matthew Locke (Brigadier General Pro Tempore of the Salisbury District Brigade)
  - Alexander Mebane Brigadier General, Commissary General of the State of North Carolina
  - Charles McDowell (Brigadier General of Morgan District Brigade)
  - Thomas Person (Brigadier General of Hillsborough District Brigade)
  - Andrew Pickens (Brigadier General Pro Tempore of Salisbury District Brigade)
  - Ambrose Ramsey (Brigadier General Pro Tempore of the Salisbury District Brigade)
  - Griffith Rutherford (Brigadier General of Salisbury District Brigade)
  - William Skinner (Brigadier General of the Edenton District Brigade)
  - William Smallwood (Major General of North Carolina Militia, also Continental officer)
  - Edward Vaile (Brigadier General of Edenton District Brigade)
- Pennsylvania
  - Daniel Brodhead
  - Samuel Miles
- Rhode Island
  - Joshua Babcock
  - William West
- South Carolina
  - John Barnwell, BG commander of the South Carolina 4th Brigade
  - Stephen Bull, BG commander of the South Carolina 1st Brigade

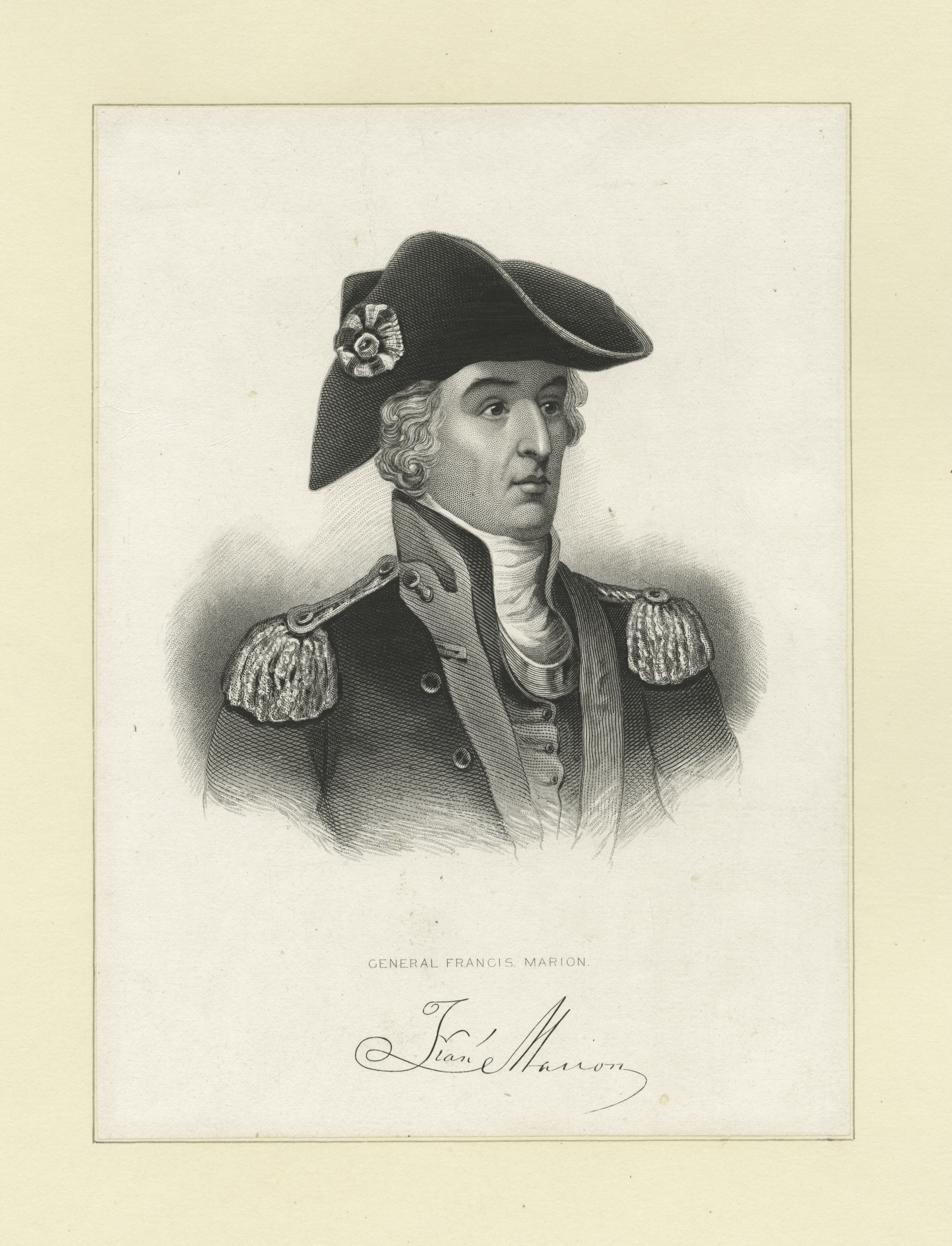
Francis Marion

  - Francis Marion, BG commander of the South Carolina 2nd Brigade, the "Swamp Fox"
  - Alexander McIntosh, BG commander of the South Carolina 4th Brigade
  - Andrew Pickens, BG commander of the South Carolina 3rd Brigade
  - Richard Richardson, BG commander of the South Carolina 2nd Brigade
  - Thomas Sumter, "The Gamecock," was the senior brigadier general appointed in South Carolina, but operated independently of the others. As a result, Sumter rarely commanded more than his own brigade of state troops and militia.
  - Andrew Williamson, BG of the South Carolina 3rd Brigade
- Vermont
  - Ethan Allen (Major General of the Vermont Republic Militia)
  - Seth Warner
- Virginia
  - George Rogers Clark, led Virginia militia on 1778-79 Illinois campaign, promoted to brigadier general in 1781 by Governor Thomas Jefferson.
  - Robert Lawson
  - Joseph Martin (Brigadier General of Virginia Militia)
  - Sampson Mathews, lieutenant colonel called on by Thomas Jefferson to resist Benedict Arnold's 1781 invasion of Virginia.

=== Continental Navy ===
- John Adams Famous Bostonian and Son of Liberty member, wrote the Navy's Code of Discipline. Additionally, through the Continental Congress commissioned the first war ships for defending the Colonies and seizing British resources from reaching enemy troops.
- John Barry was a captain in the Continental Navy. During his time as a commander he oversaw the commands of four American warships. He is known, along with John Adams and John Paul Jones, as the "Father of the American Navy".
- John Hazelwood was a commodore in the Pennsylvania and Continental Navies, active in the Philadelphia campaign and siege of Fort Mifflin.

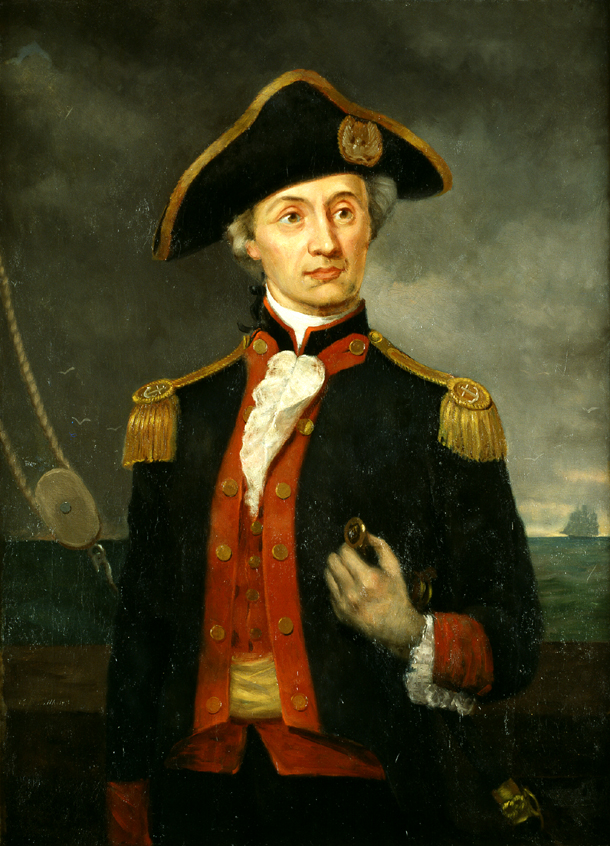
John Paul Jones

- John Paul Jones was a captain in the Continental Navy and famously took captive HMS Serapis during the Battle of Flamborough Head after his ship, Bonhomme Richard, sank. He, along with John Barry, is known as "The Father of the American Navy".

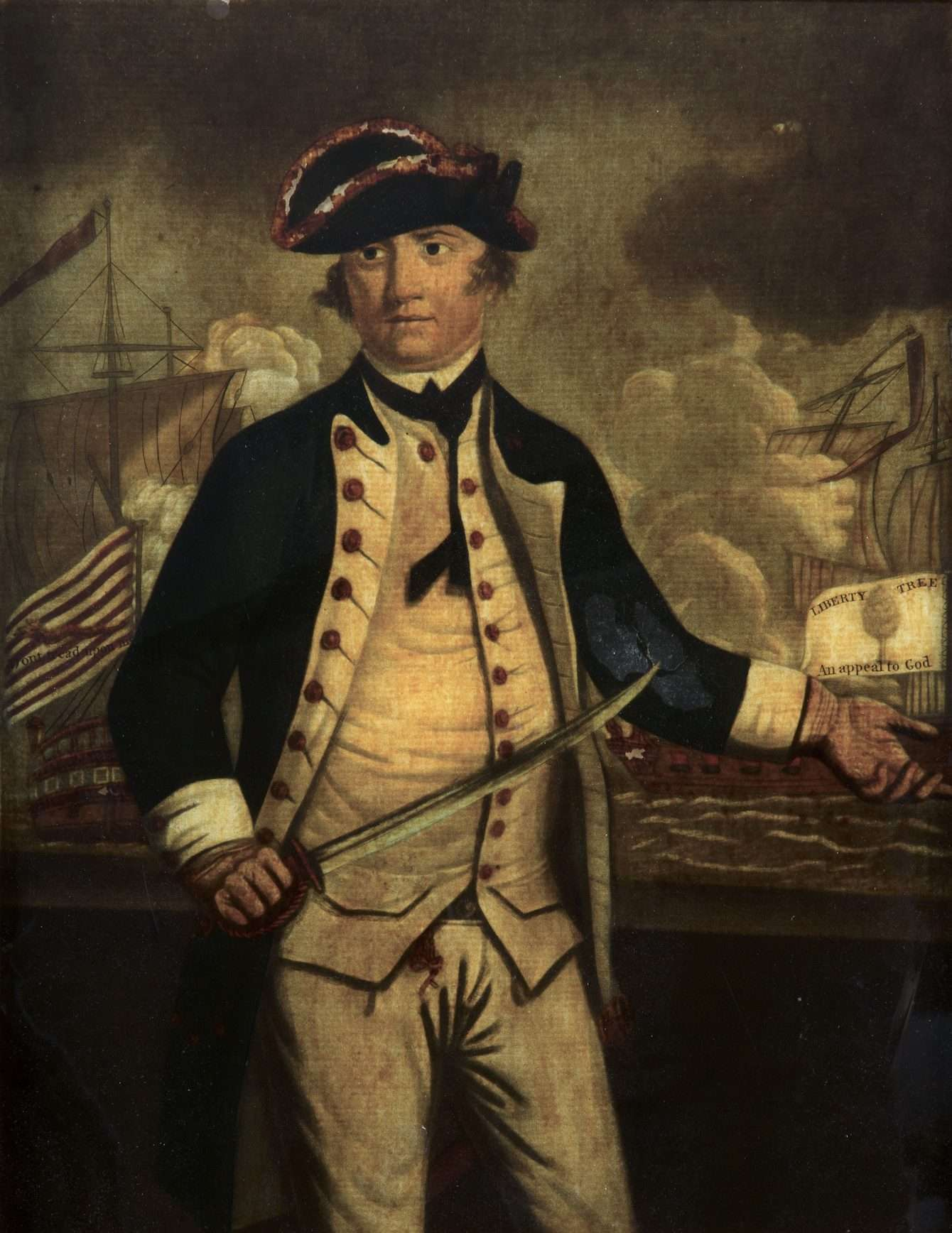
Esek Hopkins

- Esek Hopkins was an established Sea Captain and Brigadier General of Militia from Rhode Island who was named commodore and commander in chief of the Continental Navy in 1776. He disregarded his instructions from Congress to take the fleet to cruise the Southern colonies, instead attacking British colonial holdings in the Caribbean in the Raid of Nassau. This act was Initially hailed as heroic, he was subsequently censured by Congress in August 1776, and was relieved of his command in January 1778.
- James Nicholson of Virginia was the designated Senior Captain in the Navy for political reasons in October 1776. He was the senior officer in the navy after Commodore Hopkins's relief in 1778, but never exercised command over the whole navy because it had ceased to operate as an organized fleet.
- Abraham Whipple was a commodore in the Continental Navy. In one of the first military actions of the revolution in 1772, Whipple led 50 Rhode Islanders in the capture and burning of the British revenue cutter Gaspee.
- William Sisk was a captain in the Continental Navy under Commodore Whipple on the Notre Dame and a spy for Washington, Jefferson and Franklin. William's father John was a lead spy and in-law to Washington with more than sixty family members spying and fighting in the American Revolution.

== Great Britain ==
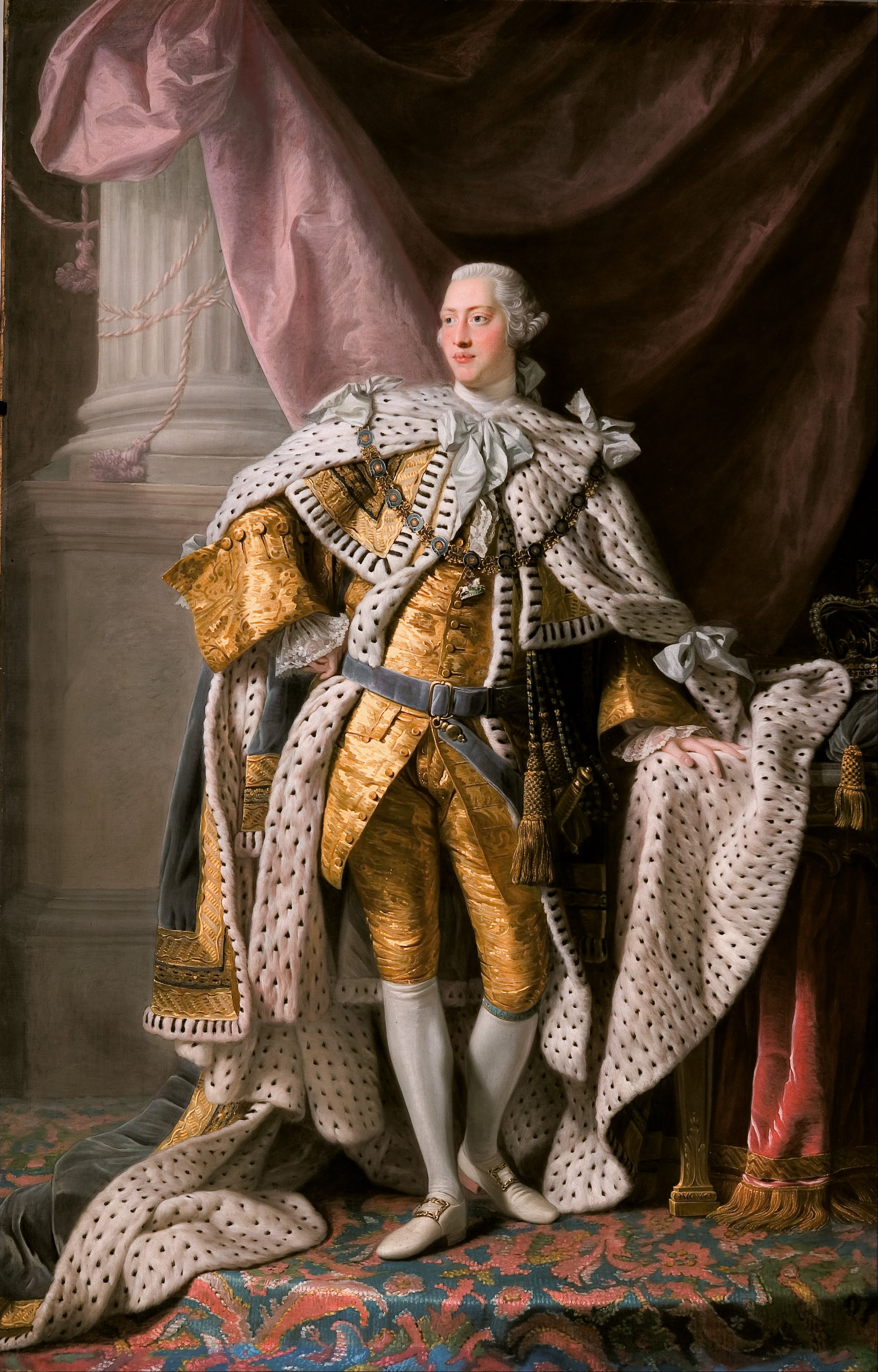
George III of Great Britain

At the head of the British forces was the King, George III. From 1772 to 1778 the office of Commander-in-Chief was vacant, but from 1778 to 1782 Sir Jeffery Amherst held the post, with the title of general on the Staff. He was succeeded in February 1782 by Henry Seymour Conway.

Next in importance to the Commander-in-Chief was the Secretary at War, who served as head of the War Office, and was bidden "to observe and follow such orders and directions as he should from time to time receive from the King or the general of the forces". Not until 1783 was he a minister responsible to parliament. At the start of part of the war the secretary was Lord Barrington. He was replaced in 1778 by Charles Jenkinson who held this position until the fall of Lord North's government.

=== Crown and Government officials ===
- King George III of Great Britain
- Frederick North, Lord North, Prime Minister (1770–1782)
- Charles Watson-Wentworth, 2nd Marquess of Rockingham, Prime Minister (1782, died in office)
- William Petty, 2nd Earl of Shelburne, Prime Minister (1782–1783)
- George Germain, Secretary of State for the Colonies (1775–1782)
- John Montagu, 4th Earl of Sandwich, First Lord of the Admiralty

=== Commander-in-Chief of the Forces ===
- Office vacant from 1772 to 1778
- Sir Jeffery Amherst (1778–1782)
- The Hon. Henry Seymour Conway (1782–1793)

=== Secretaries at War ===
- William Wildman Shute Barrington, 2nd Viscount Barrington
- Charles Jenkinson

=== Commander-in-Chief, North America ===
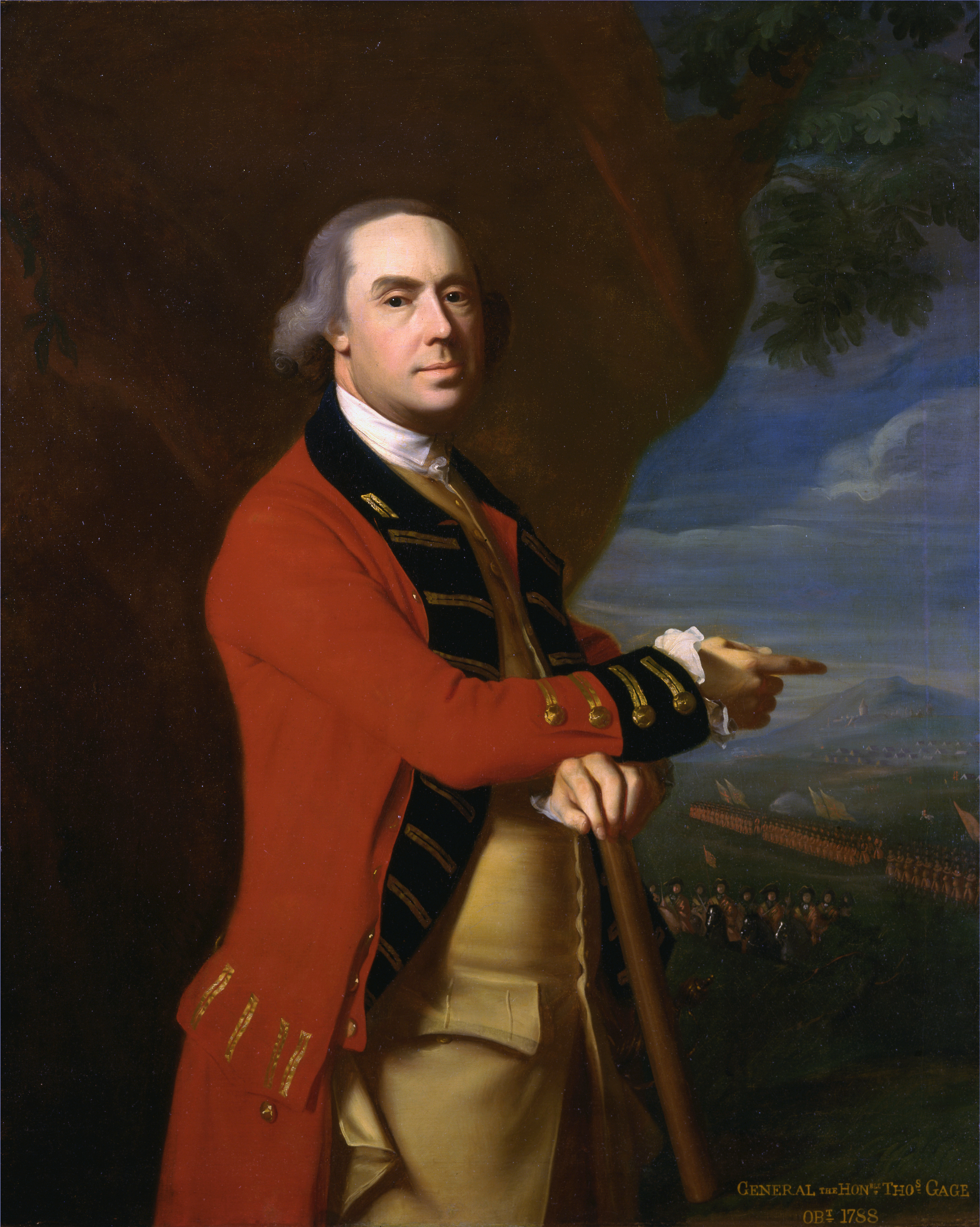
Gen. Thomas Gage

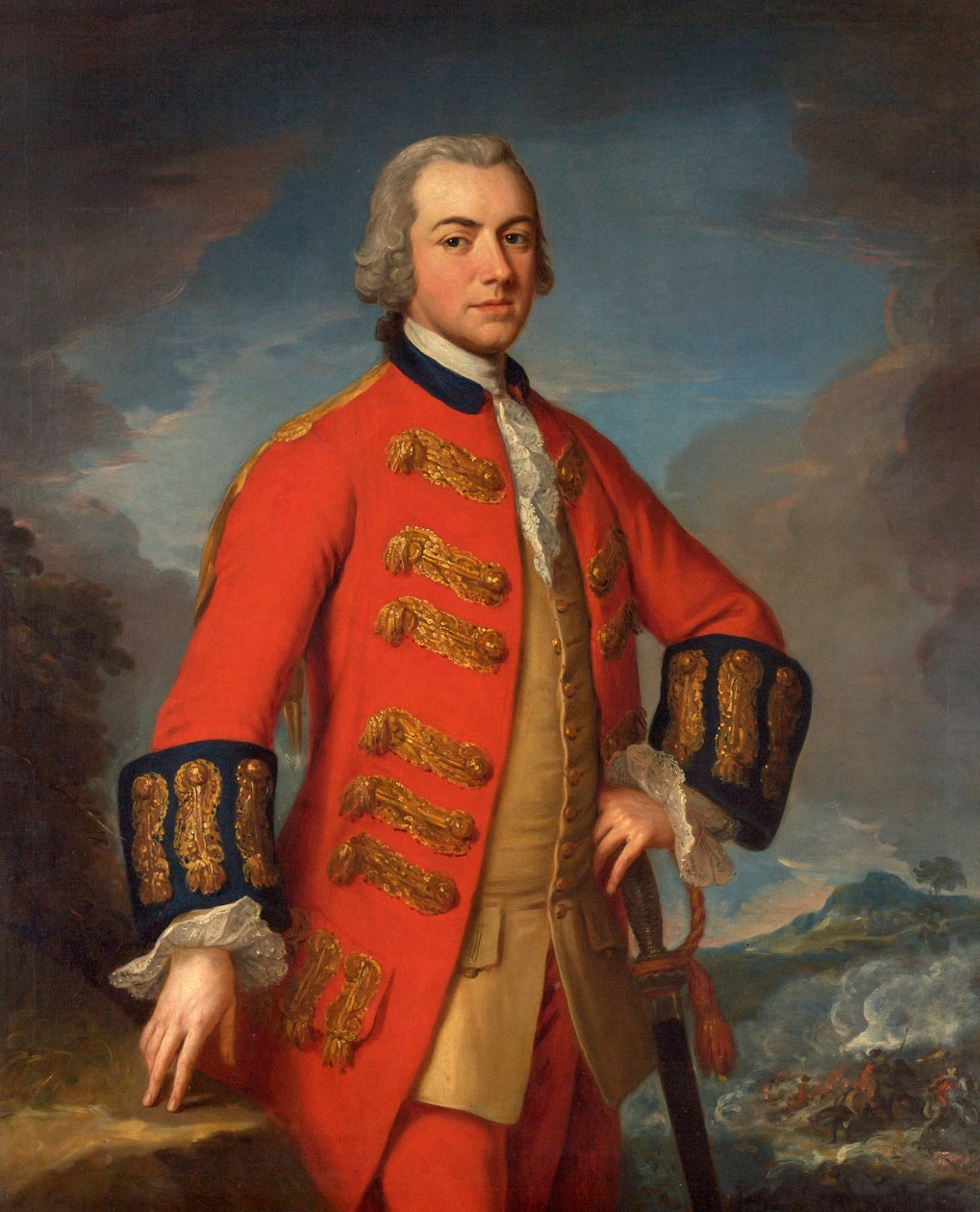
Sir Henry Clinton

Until the war was widened into a global conflict by France's entry in 1778, the war's military activities were primarily directed by the Commander-in-Chief, North America.

- General Thomas Gage was commander-in-chief of North American forces from 1763 until 1775, and governor of the Province of Massachusetts Bay from 1774 to 1776. He presided over the rising tensions (with his actions sometimes contributing to them, in the opinions of some historians) that led to the outbreak of the war. He was recalled after the Battle of Bunker Hill.

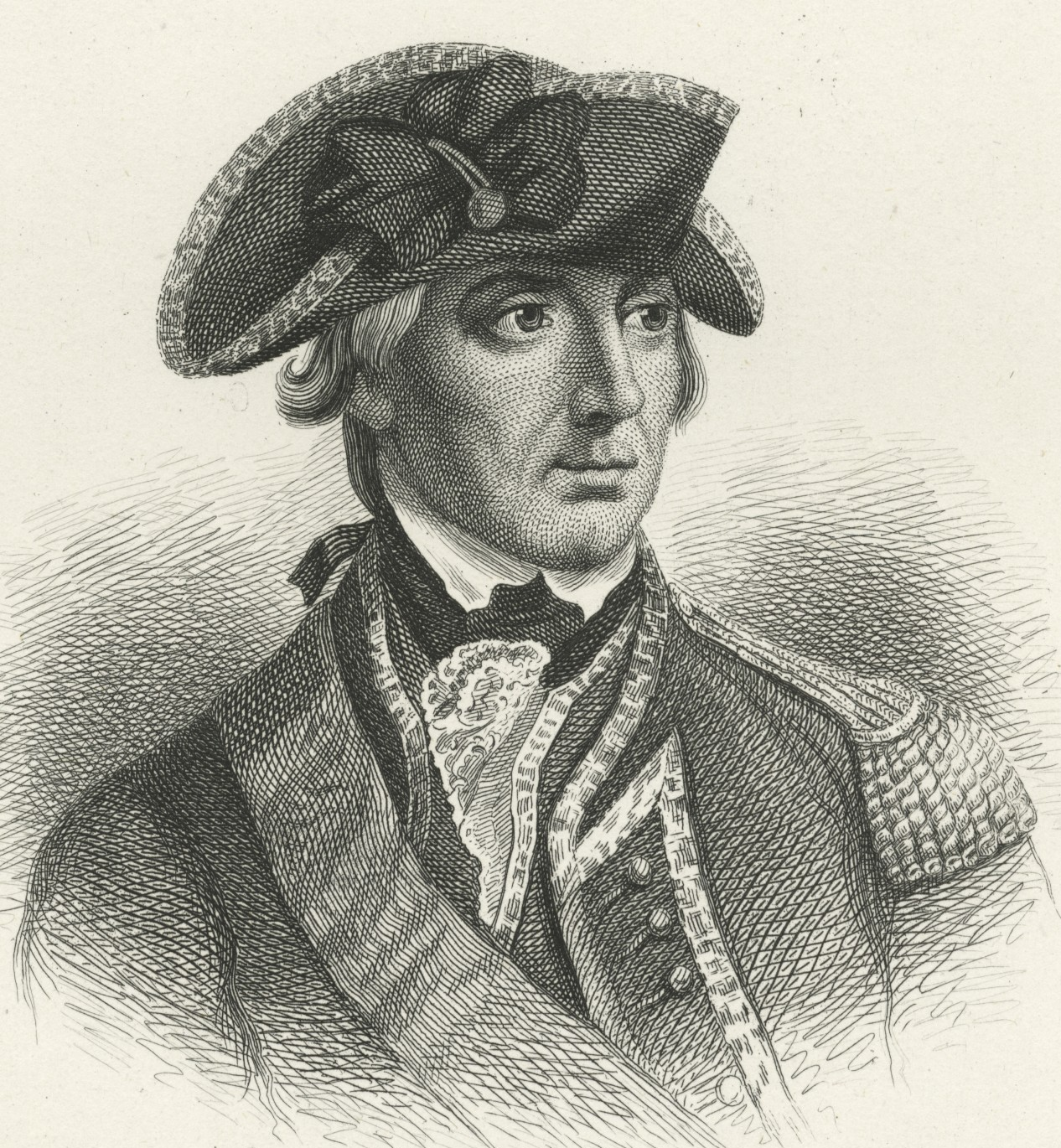
William Howe

- General William Howe replaced Gage, and personally directed the war effort in 1776 and 1777, including the British captures of New York City and Philadelphia. He failed to gain control over New Jersey, and his actions in taking Philadelphia contributed to the failure of John Burgoyne's Saratoga campaign. He resigned in early 1778.

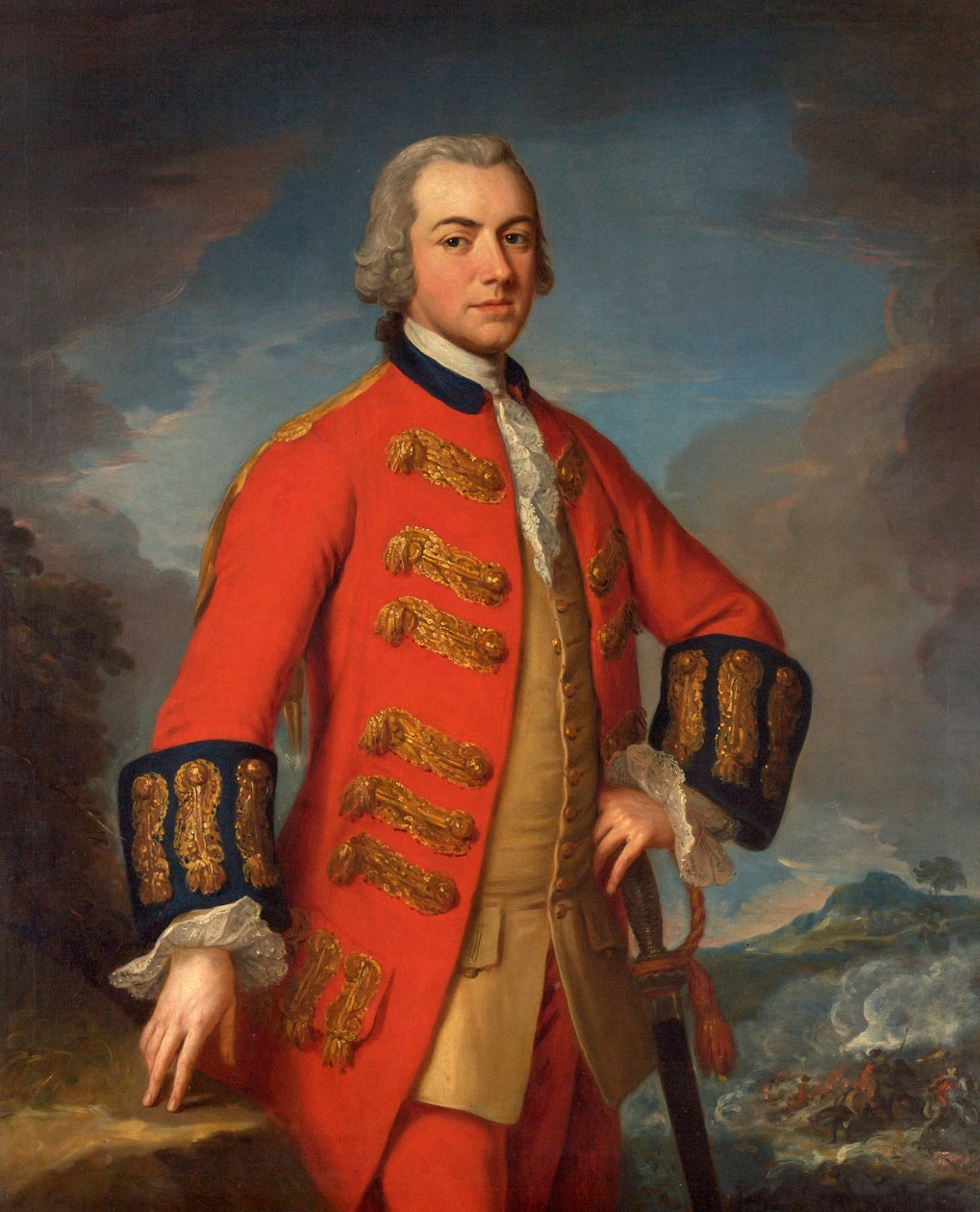
Sir Henry Clinton

- Sir Henry Clinton served as commander-in-chief from 1778 to 1782. He oversaw the British army's retreat from Philadelphia, and then directed the Siege of Charleston, the landing of a large body of troops early in the "Southern strategy". He directed most British activities afterward from his base in New York, and played a role in negotiating Benedict Arnold's change of allegiance. Following Cornwallis' surrender at Yorktown, he was replaced by Guy Carleton.

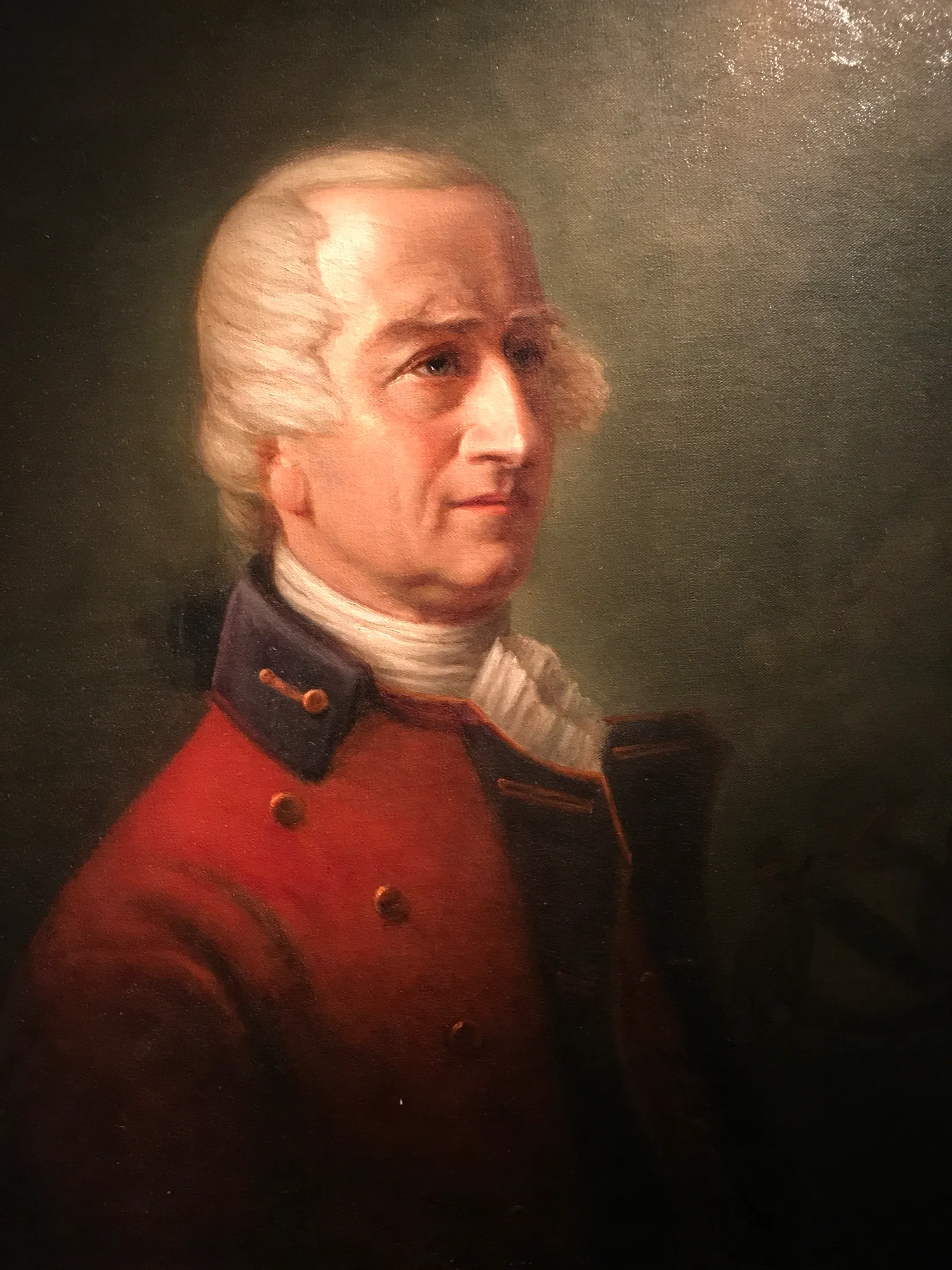
Sir Guy Carleton

- Sir Guy Carleton was governor of Quebec from 1768 to 1777, overseeing the province's defense against the 1775 invasion, and its first counterattack. Denied command of what became John Burgoyne's campaign, he resigned in 1777. In 1782, King George appointed him to replace Clinton as commander-in-chief. He directed the withdrawal of British troops from the states and helped to organize the relocation of thousands of Loyalists to other British territories.

=== Lieutenant and Major Generals ===
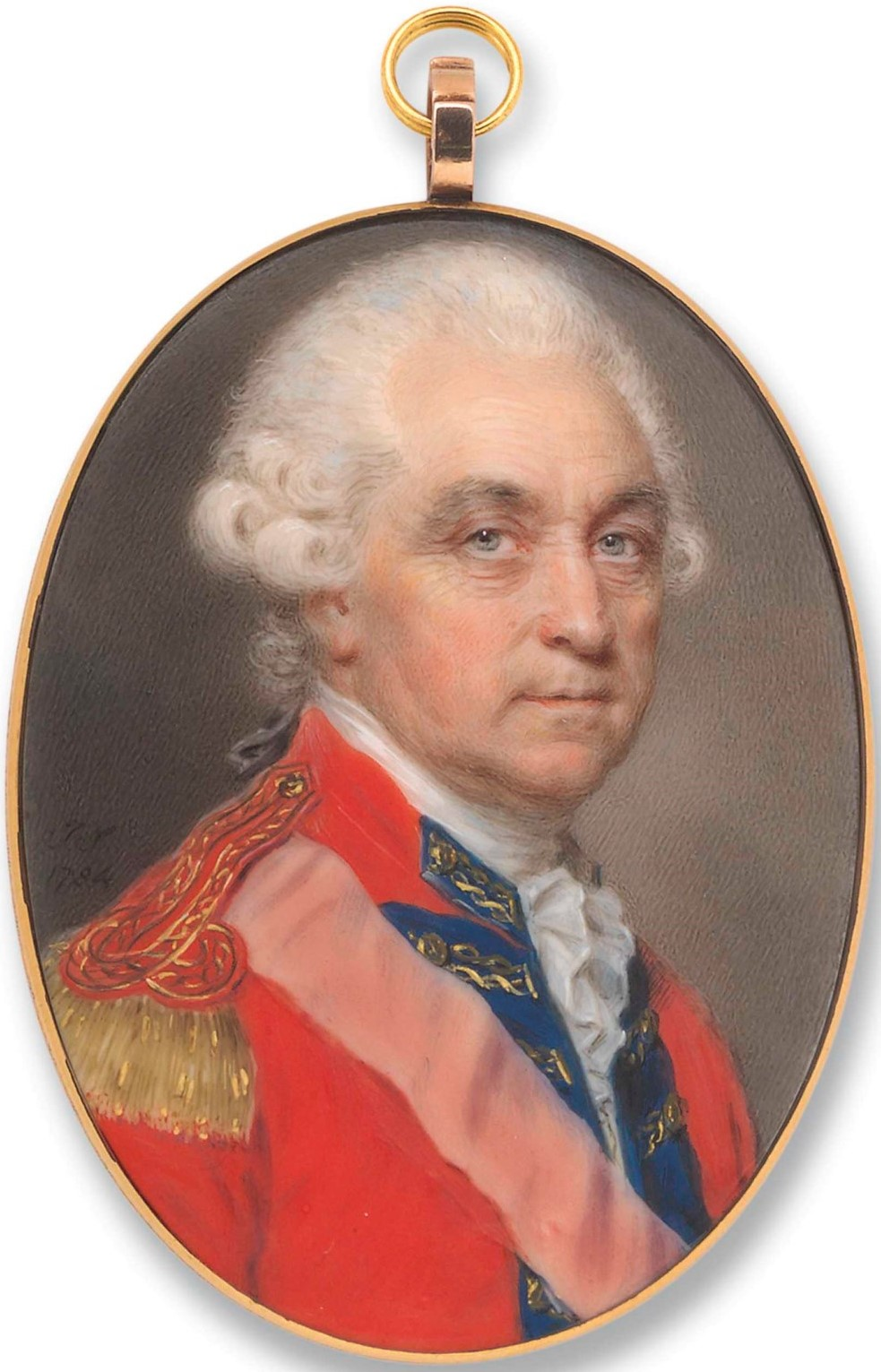
Sir Robt. Boyd

- Sir Robert Boyd was a lieutenant general who served in the garrison at the Great Siege of Gibraltar.

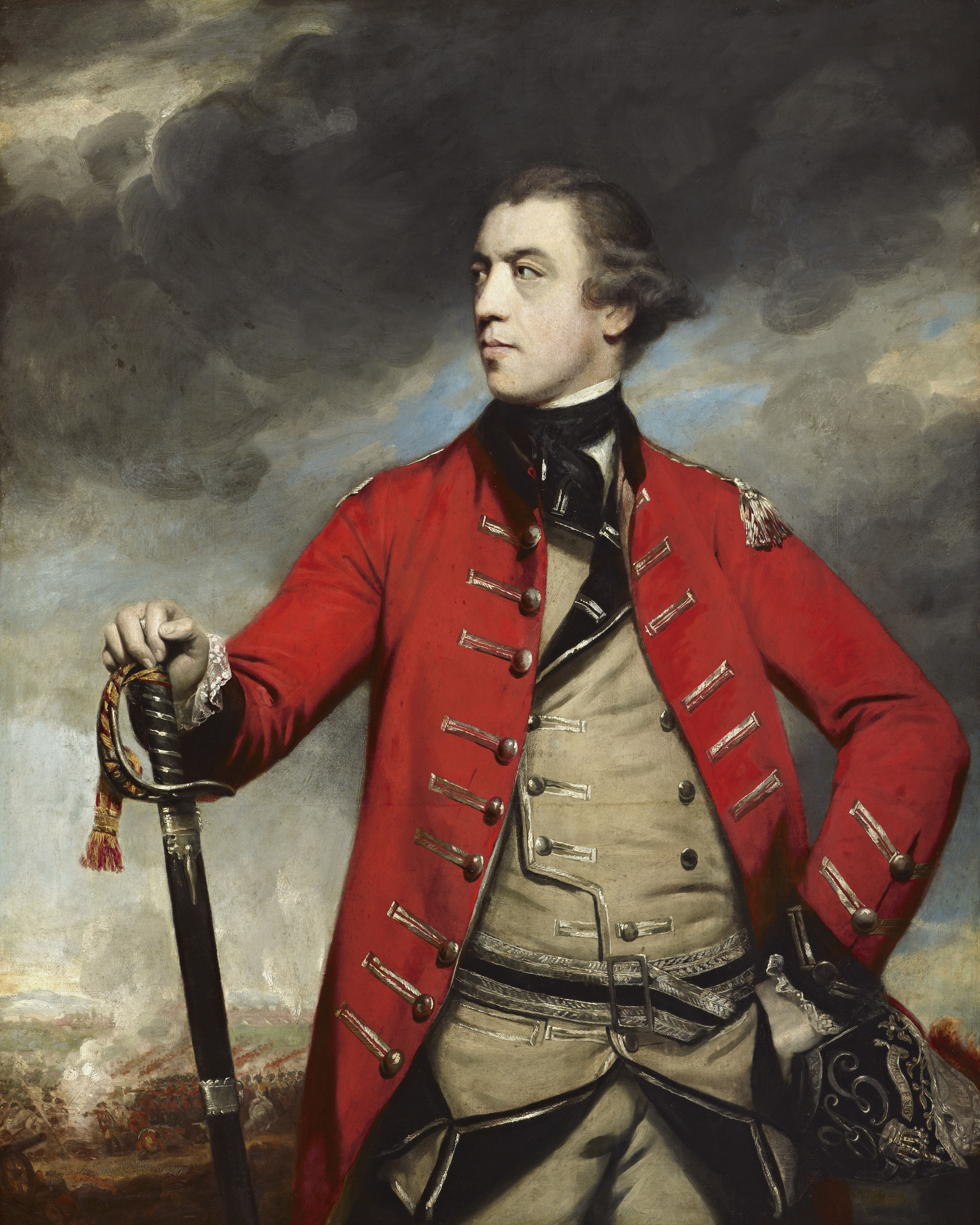
John Burgoyne

- John Burgoyne was a lieutenant general who led a British attempt to gain control of the Hudson River valley in 1777 that was stopped at Saratoga, and surrendered his army. Paroled to England and eventually exchanged, he did not serve further in the war.
- Archibald Campbell, while a lieutenant colonel, regained control of Georgia in 1779 and served as its royal governor. Promoted to major general, he served in Jamaica, becoming its governor in 1782.
- John Campbell served in the Boston campaign and the New York and New Jersey campaign early in the war, before being given command of the defense of West Florida. Captured in the 1781 Siege of Pensacola, he ended the war in the New York City garrison.
- Henry Clinton, was sent into Massachusetts along with William Howe and John Burgoyne to aid Thomas Gage. He was one of the men responsible for planning the Battle of Bunker Hill. He would later serve as commander in Chief, a variety of operations, and leading the relief of the 1779 Penobscot Expedition. Thereafter he served in European waters, where he participated in one of the relief convoys to Gibraltar.
- Sir Eyre Coote was the commander-in-chief of British forces in India. While not personally involved in combat against the French and Dutch there, troops that were part of his command were involved in engagements against French and Dutch targets, while he was preoccupied with the Second Anglo-Mysore War.

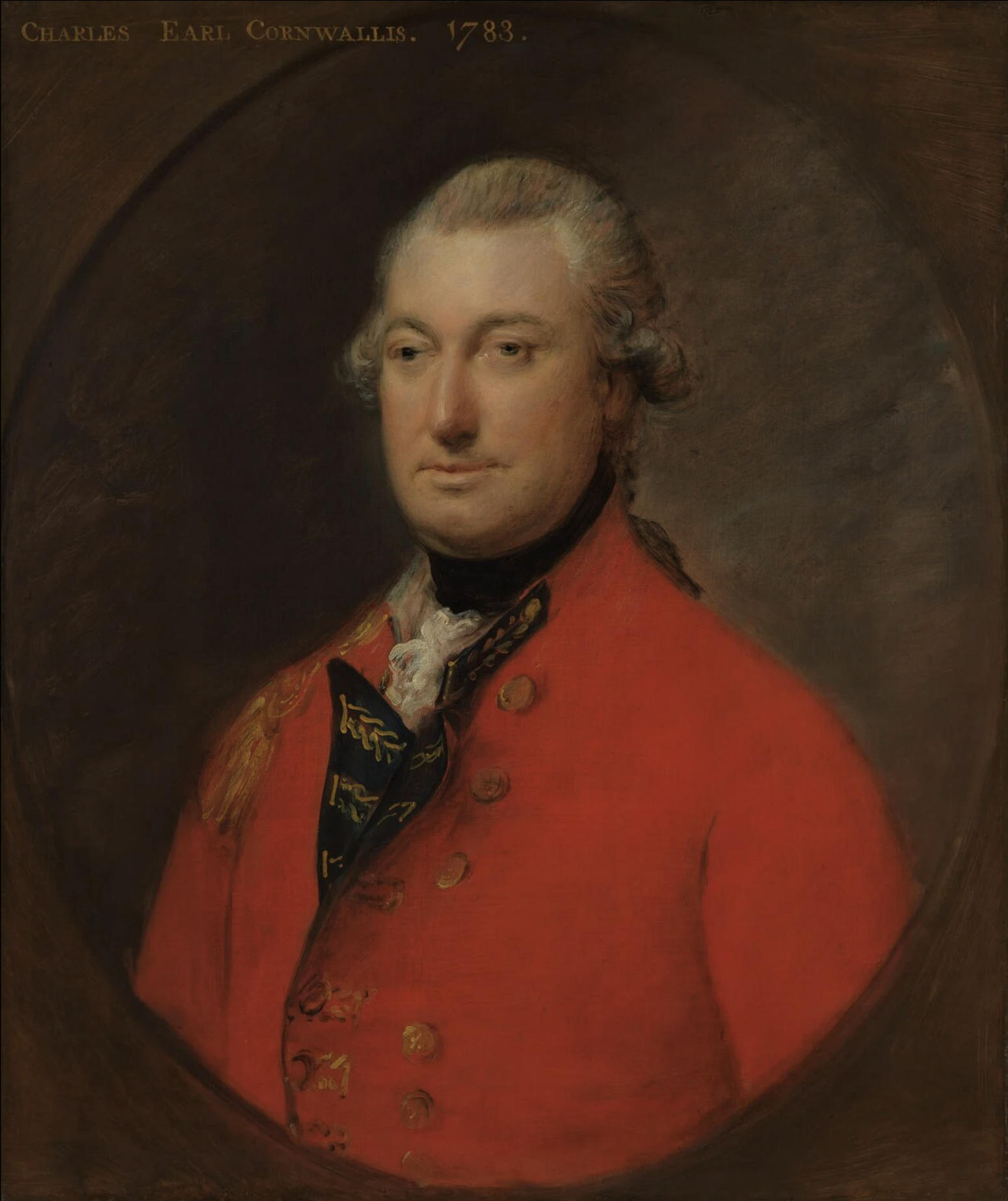
Lord Cornwallis

- Charles Cornwallis, 1st Marquess Cornwallis participated in many campaigns in North America. He served under Howe and Clinton in the New York and Philadelphia campaigns and was given control of the southern army by Clinton after the Siege of Charleston. At first successfully driving the Continentals from South Carolina, he was eventually forced to surrender his army at Yorktown in the last major engagement between American French and British forces.
- Sir John Dalling, 1st Baronet was a general and governor of Jamaica until 1781, where he coordinated British military affairs throughout the Caribbean and the West Indies.

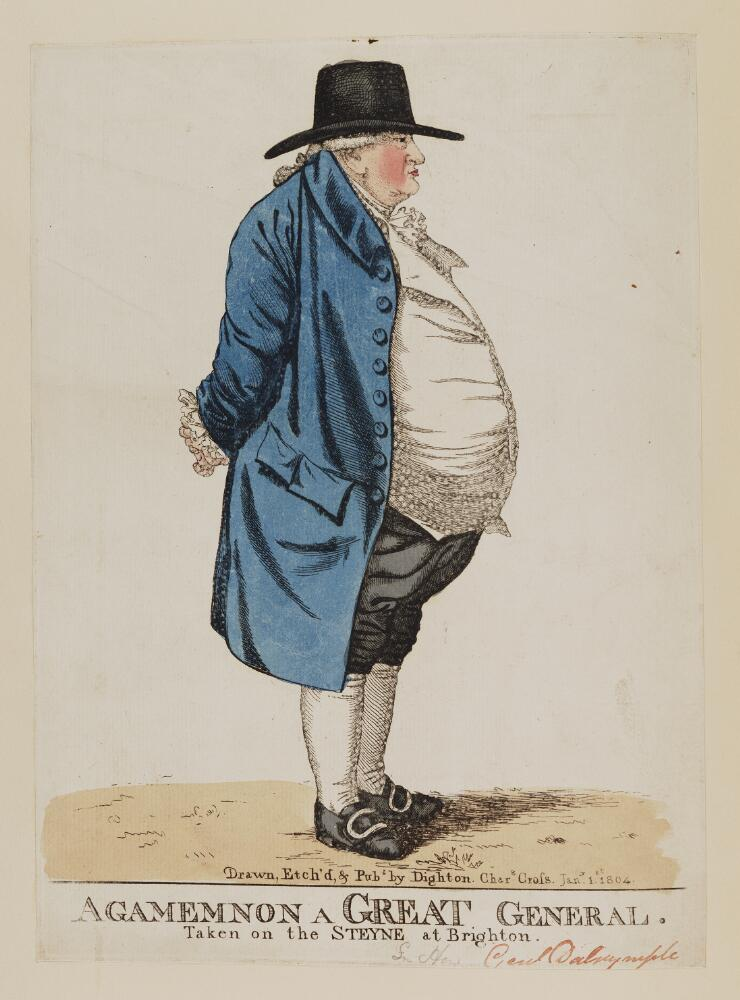
Wm. Dalrymple

- William Dalrymple commanded British troops in Boston when 3-400 civilians provoked 8 soldiers into firing their muskets without orders, killing five. Patriots subsequently publicized it heavily as the "Boston Massacre". He served as quartermaster general of the British Army in North America from 1779 to 1783.

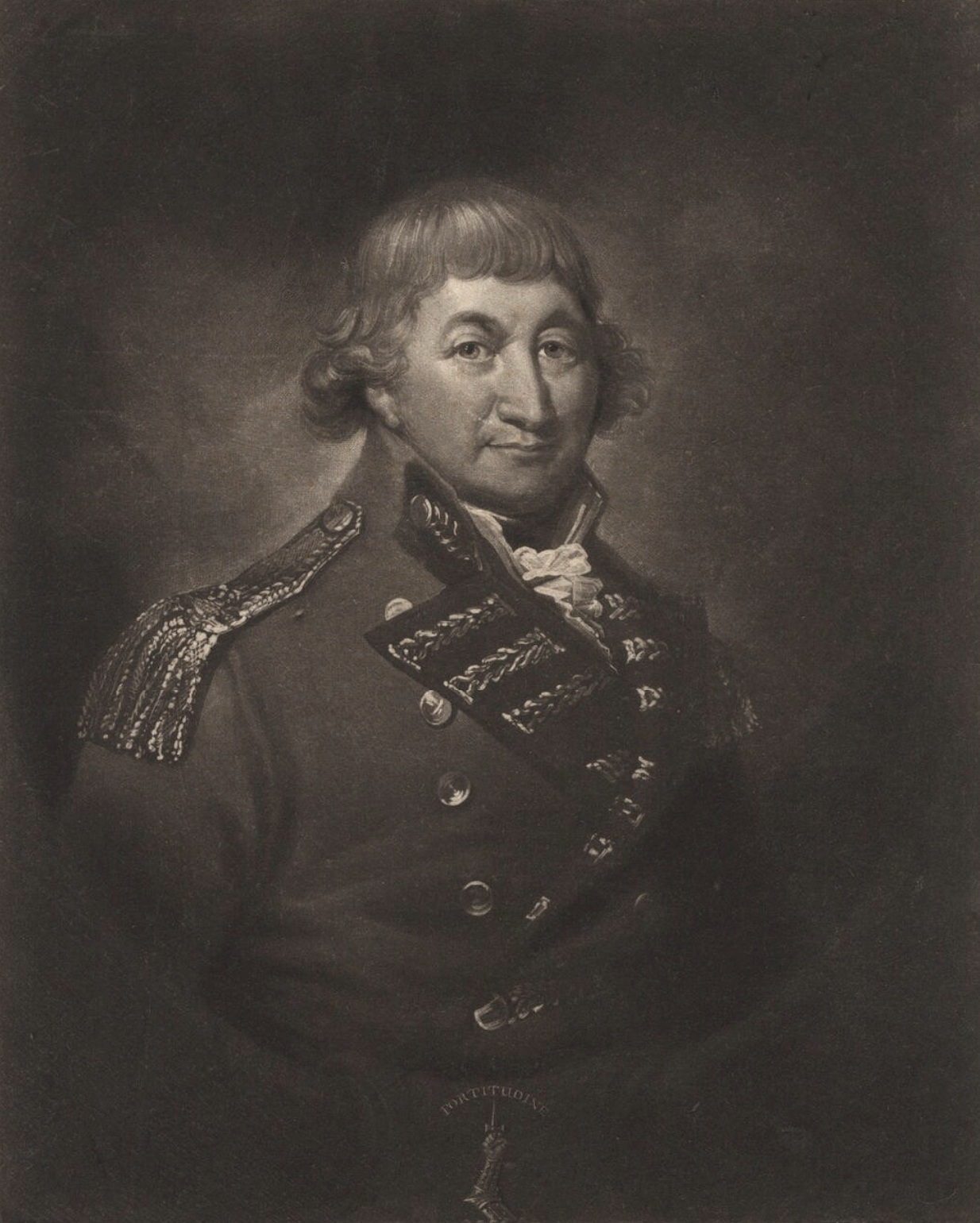
Wm. Erskine

- Sir William Erskine, 1st Baronet was a general who served under Howe and Clinton in the New York and Philadelphia campaigns. He also served for a time as quartermaster general before leaving active service in 1779.
- Sir William Fawcett became the army's adjutant general in 1781. His most important role in the war was overseeing the embarkation of Hessian troops for deployment to the various theaters of war.

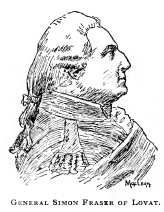
Simon Fraser

- The Hon. Simon Fraser of Lovat was a general and colonel of the 71st (Highland) Regiment of Foot. While he did not serve in the war, he was responsible for raising the regiment, which saw service throughout much of North America, and was captured at Yorktown.
- Sir William Green was a general. He was the chief engineer during the Great Siege of Gibraltar, and had risen to major general by the end of the siege, later full general.

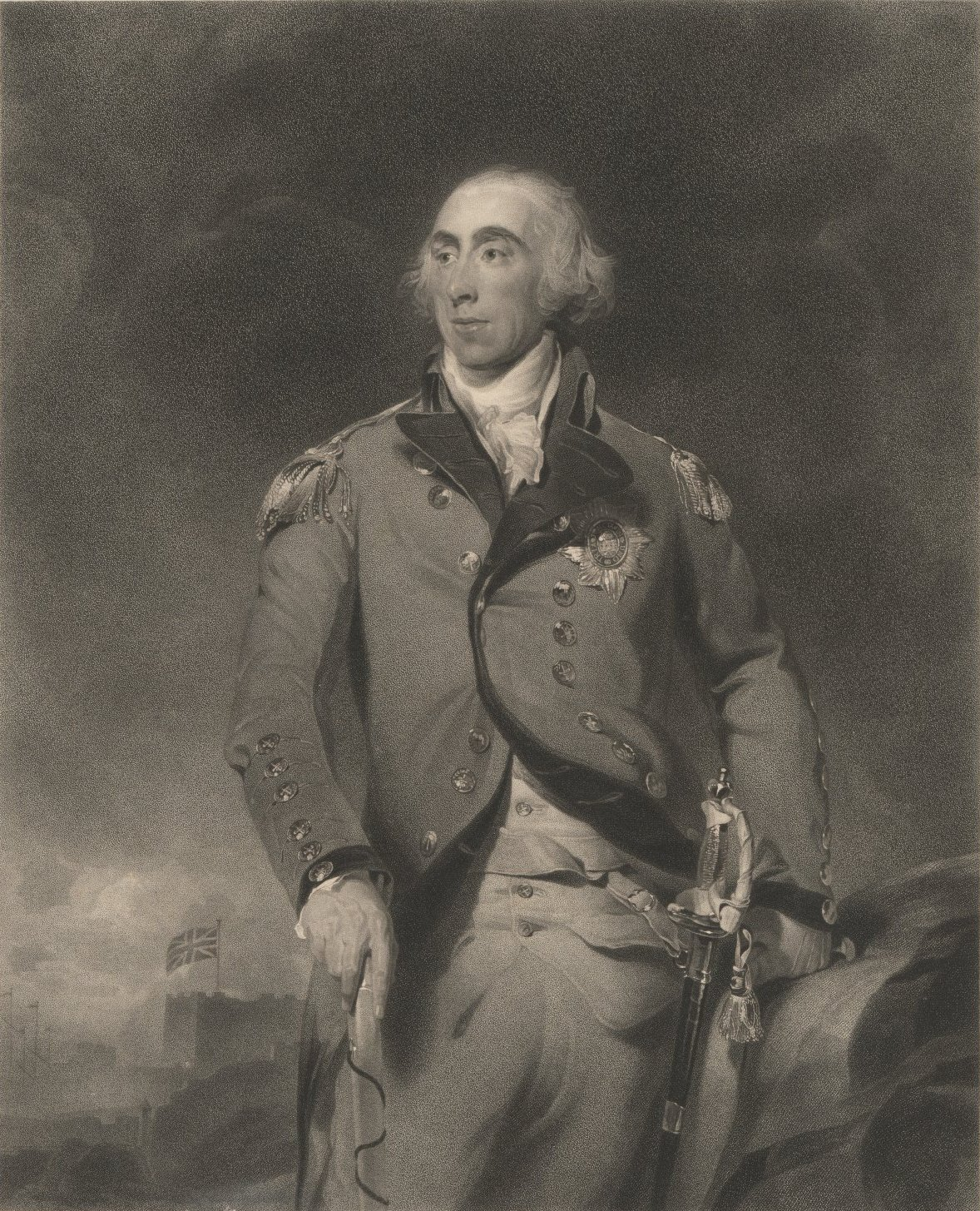
Earl Grey

- Charles Grey, 1st Earl Grey was one of the more successful army leaders. He led a brigade at the Battle of Brandywine, led forces in the Battle of Paoli and in raids on New Bedford and Martha's Vineyard, Massachusetts.
- Frederick Haldimand was responsible for the British troops in the Siege of Boston, although his authority was often superseded by Thomas Gage, who had overall command. Haldimand served as governor of Quebec from 1778 to 1786, with responsibility for the defense of the province and the organization and support of frontier attacks in the Ohio Country.
- William Howe Before taking over as the commander in chief, North America, Howe, along with Henry Clinton were sent into Massachusetts to serve with then commander in chief, North America Thomas Gage. Howe was the main person in charge of the British forces in the Battle of Bunker Hill.
- The Hon. Alexander Leslie served under Cornwallis in the southern campaigns, but was commanding forces in Charleston at the time of Cornwallis' surrender at Yorktown.
- William Medows distinguished himself in the Philadelphia campaign and the Battle of St. Lucia in 1778. He was then despatched to India, where he was primarily involved in the Second Anglo-Mysore War.
- Hector Munro, 8th of Novar was a general active in India. He led the forces that captured Pondicherry in 1778, and led forces against the Mysoreans.
- William Phillips was an artillery general. He served under Burgoyne and was captured at Saratoga in 1777. Exchanged in 1780, he took over leadership of Benedict Arnold's army in Virginia, before becoming ill and dying.
- William Picton was a major general who served in the Gibraltar garrison during the siege.

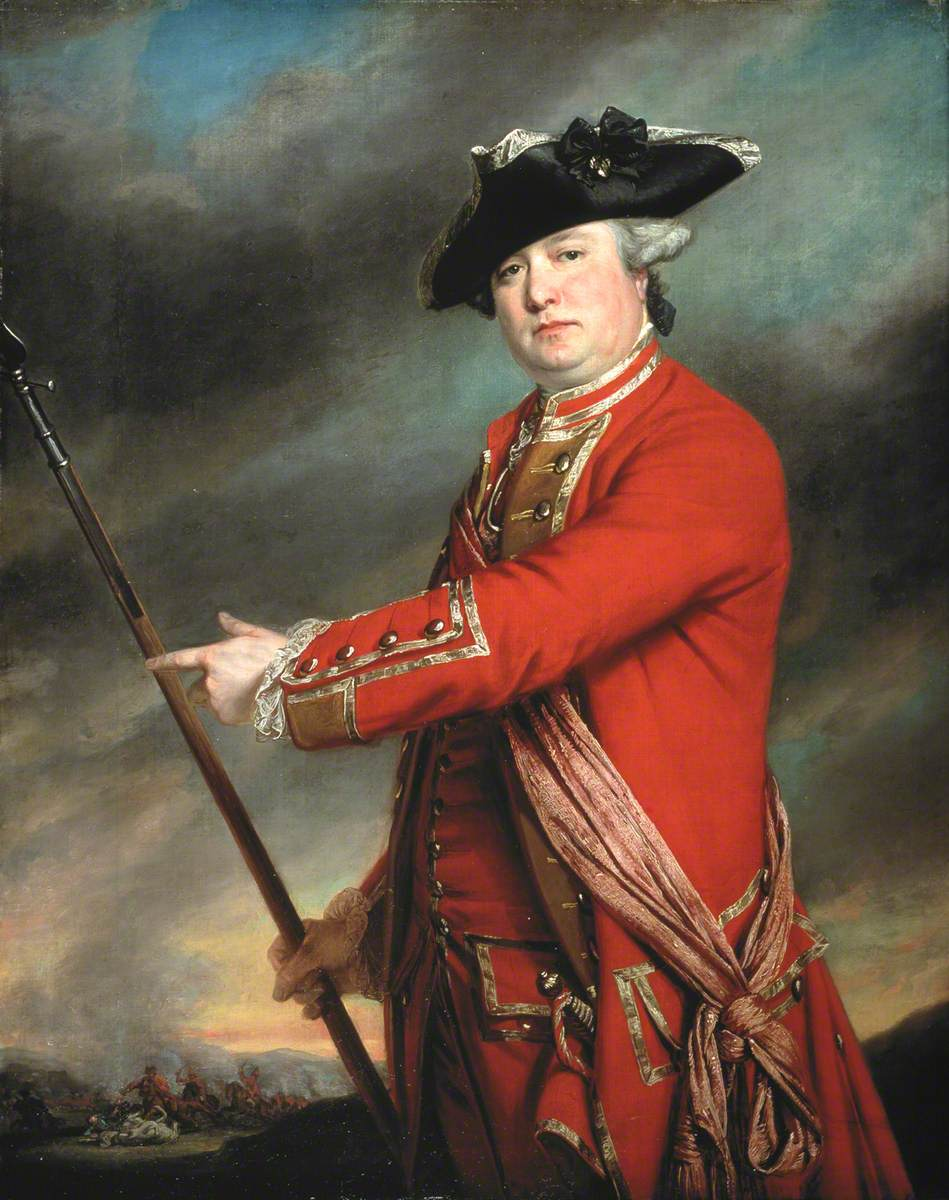
Francis Smith

- Francis Smith. As a major general, he oversaw the expedition of Concord to find weapons that were being smuggled by rebels. The British troops were halted by rebels on the way in Lexington, causing a skirmish to break out. The first battle of the war.

=== Brigadier generals ===
- James Agnew
- Benedict Arnold was a leading force for the Continental Army in the early days of the war, changed sides and fled to join the British, for whom he served until the end of 1781 as a brigadier general.
- Oliver De Lancey Sr.
- Simon Fraser of Balnain
- George Garth
- Sir John Johnson, 2nd Baronet
- Francis McLean
- Augustine Prevost
- Francis Rawdon-Hastings, 1st Marquess of Hastings

=== Other notable officers ===
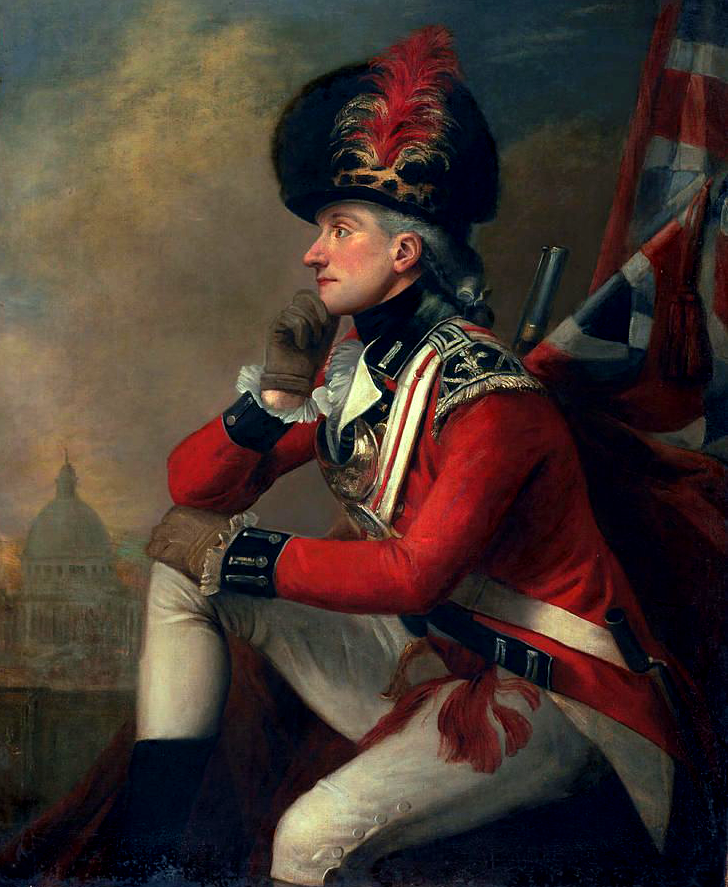
Major John André, Head of British Secret Service in America

- Lieutenant Colonel James Abercrombie †, while leading the retreat at the Battle of Bunker Hill, he was fatally injured in the thigh from being shot by a rebel.
- Lieutenant Colonel John Graves Simcoe, he was a captain who traveled across the Northeast to look for American spies. He was featured in the AMC Series Turn: Washington's Spies, as one of the main antagonists.
- Lieutenant Colonel Banastre Tarleton, a cavalry officer who led the British Legion, a regiment of American loyalist cavalry and light infantry. Though reviled by Americans for alleged atrocities, Tarleton’s successes on the battlefield made him one of the few British heroes of the war.
- Major John André † had just become head of British intelligence operations across the 13 Colonies, working under General Clinton. He negotiated with Benedict Arnold and, after being captured, was ordered hanged by George Washington.
- Major John Pitcairn † physically led the British forces in the expedition of Concord, in which it was speculated that rebels were hiding weapons. He died soon after the Battle of Bunker Hill after sustaining 6 gunshot wounds, including one to the head.
- Captain Thomas Preston Five years before war broke out, Preston was in charge of the eight-man squad who shot several of a crowd of three or four hundred who were harassing them verbally and throwing various projectiles in what became known to Americans as the Boston Massacre.

=== Royal Navy ===
- Mariot Arbuthnot was Vice-Admiral of the Blue in the Royal Navy, and commanded its North American station from 1779 until 1781. He led the navy in the Siege of Charleston and the Battle of Cape Henry. He was also Lieutenant Governor of Nova Scotia from 1776 to 1778, active in suppressing Patriot sentiment in that province.
- The Hon. John Byron was the admiral in command of the West Indies naval station in 1778 and 1779. He fought the minor Battle of Grenada against d'Estaing in 1779, and retired the following year.
- Sir George Collier was the commander of the Royal Navy's North American station from 1776 to 1779.
- Sir Charles Douglas was an admiral in the Royal Navy. He led the advance fleet that brought relief to Quebec in April 1776, and served under Rodney in the Battle of the Saintes.

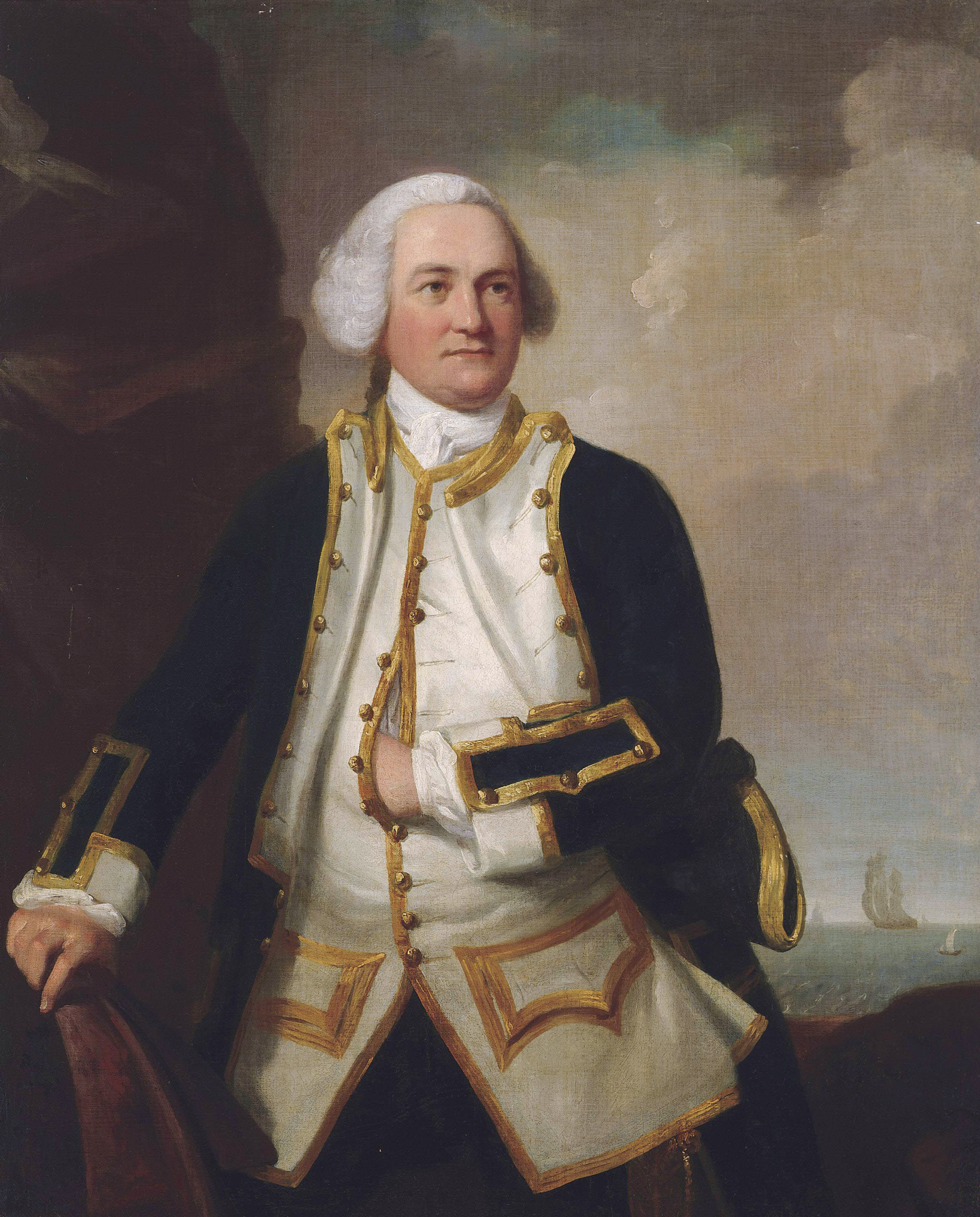
Samuel Graves

- Samuel Graves was the admiral in charge of the navy's North American station at the outbreak of the war. He directed naval activities for much of the Siege of Boston, and gave orders resulting in the politically and literally inflammatory Burning of Falmouth in October 1775. He was recalled in January 1776, and saw no more service in the war.

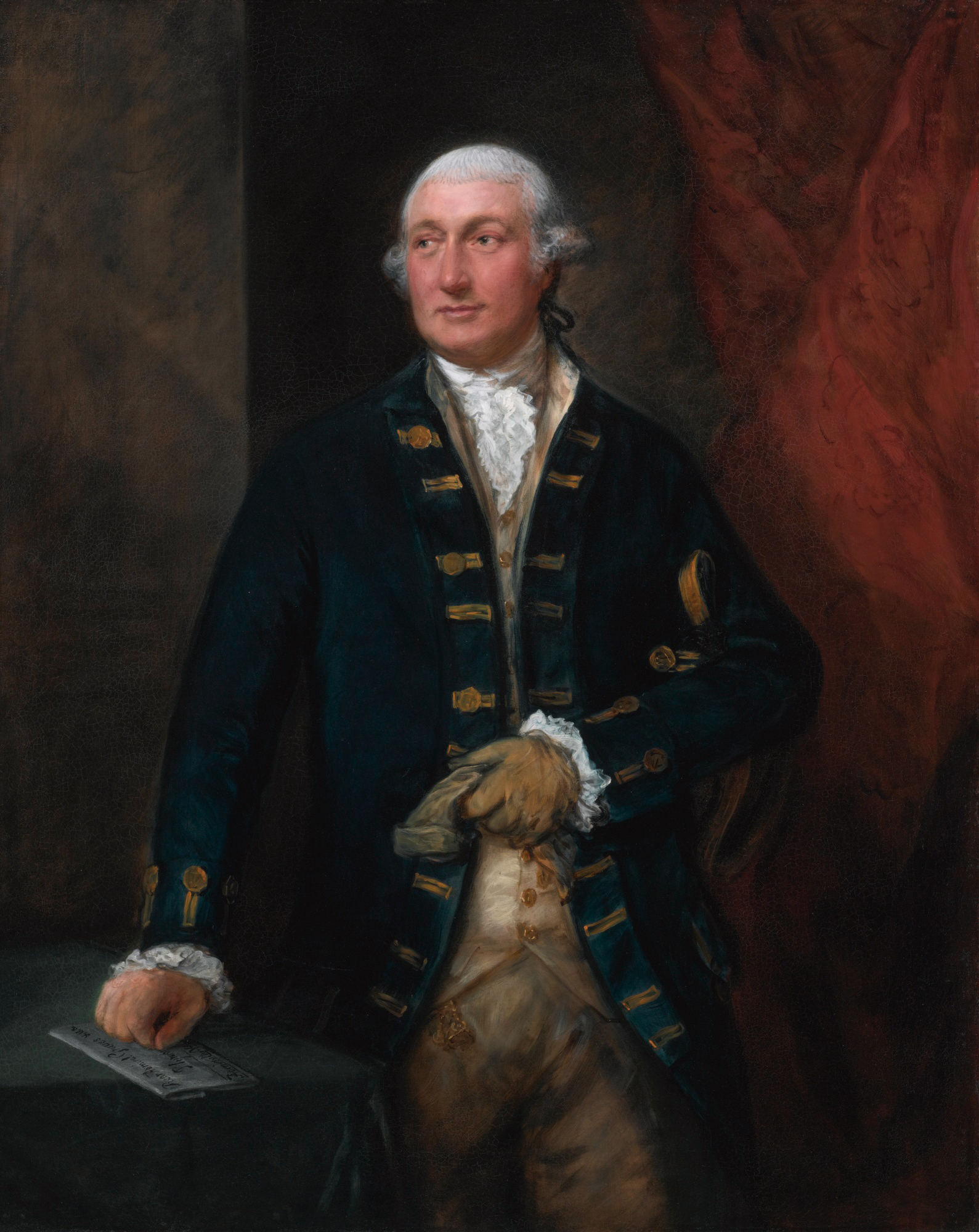
Thomas Graves

- Thomas Graves, 1st Baron Graves was an admiral and the nephew of Samuel Graves. As a lieutenant, he participated in the Battle of Chelsea Creek in 1775. By 1781 he had risen to become commander of the North American station. His fleet was driven off in the critical Battle of the Chesapeake that enabled the French blockade of Yorktown.

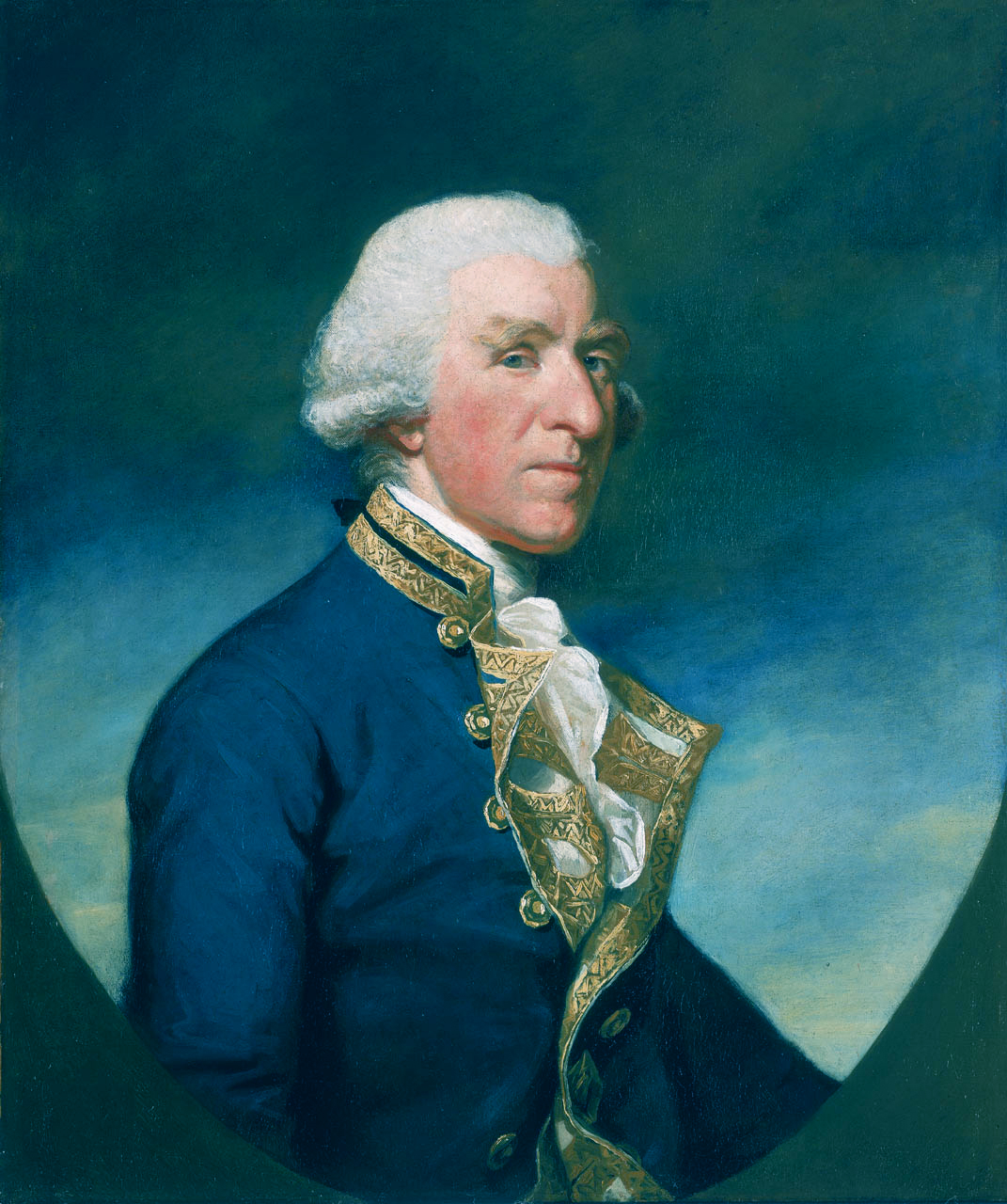
Samuel Hood

- Samuel Hood, 1st Viscount Hood was an admiral, who served primarily under Rodney in the West Indies. He was also present at the Battle of the Chesapeake under Thomas Graves.

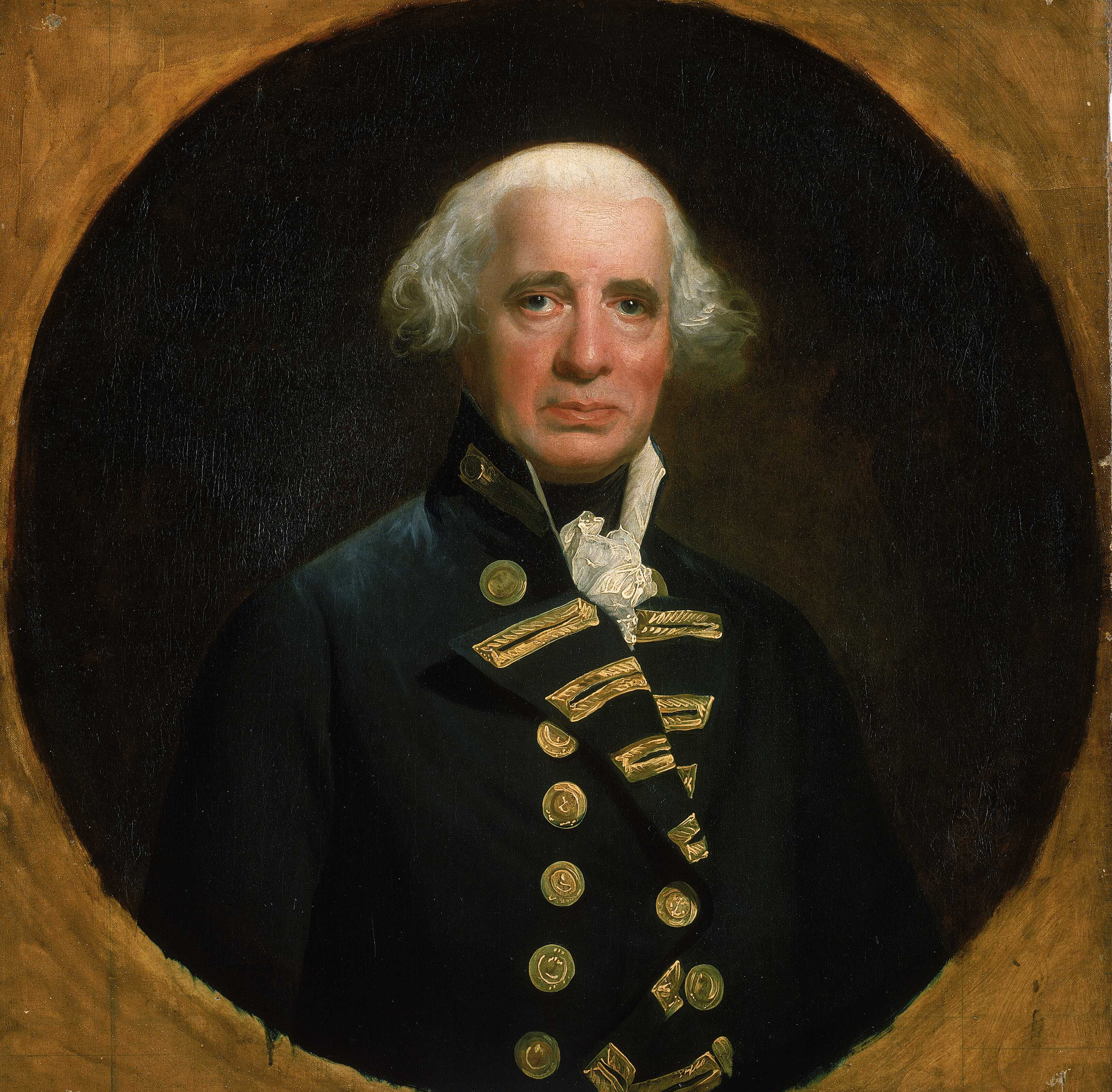
Richard Howe

- Richard Howe, 1st Earl Howe was chief of the North American naval station from 1776 to 1778, and brother of Sir William Howe. He was given diplomatic authority by King George to conduct negotiations at the unsuccessful Staten Island Peace Conference with John Adams, Benjamin Franklin and Edward Rutledge. Sympathetic to the colonists' cause, he saw no further service until 1782, when he participated in the relief of Gibraltar.

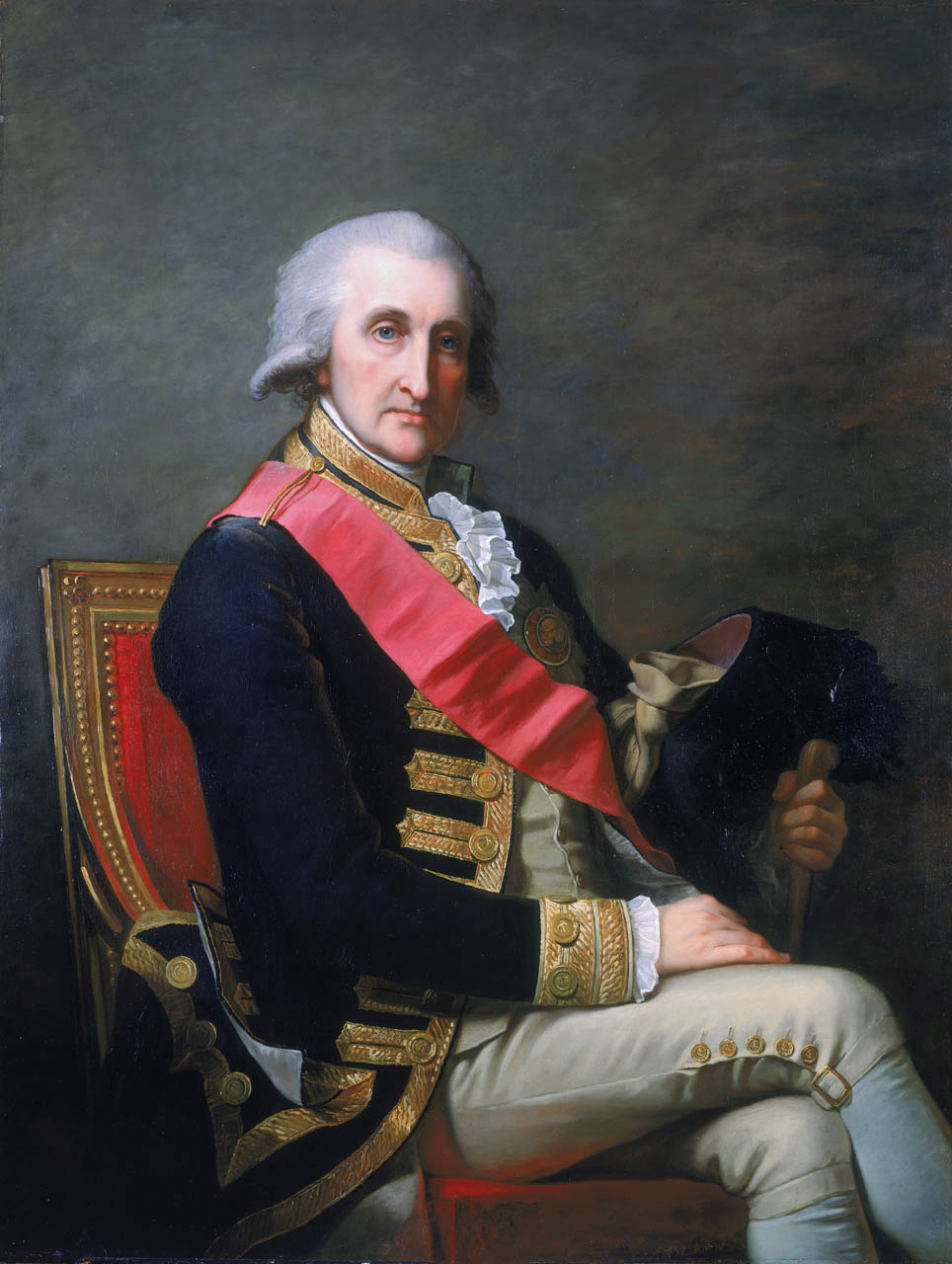
George Rodney

- George Rodney was the commander of the naval station in the West Indies. He also participated in one of the expeditions to relieve Gibraltar, and, after capturing de Grasse in the Battle of the Saintes, famously boasted, "Within two little years I have taken two Spanish, one French and one Dutch admirals." However, his Capture of Saint Eustatius, an undefended Dutch island in the West Indies and a center for contraband trade, he stayed to take loot, pack it, and ship it to Britain, for which other Royal Navy officers scathingly criticised him. In particular, Viscount Samuel Hood said that Rodney should have sailed to intercept a French fleet under Rear Admiral Francois Joseph Paul de Grasse, travelling to Martinique. The French fleet instead turned north and headed for the Chesapeake Bay of Virginia and Maryland, fighting the Battle of the Chesapeake. The French victory there blocked the Royal Navy from rescuing Lord Cornwallis at Yorktown, Virginia. The surrender of his army to the combined Franco-American armies of Washington and Rochambeau in October 1781, effectively ended the British war in North America.

=== Royal governors ===
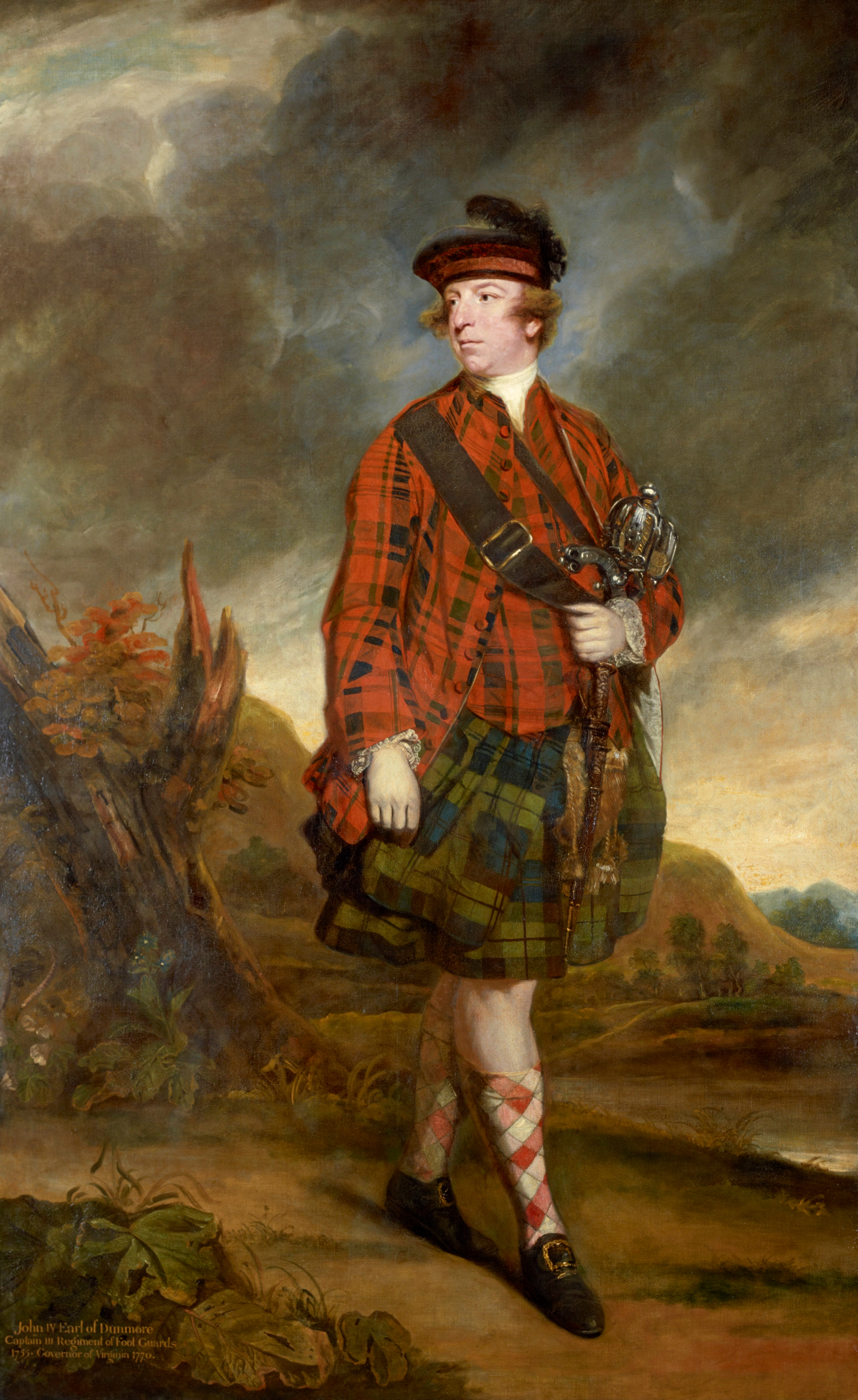
Lord Dunmore

- Montfort Browne
- Henry Hamilton
- John Murray, 4th Earl of Dunmore

=== Frontier leaders ===
- Patrick Sinclair
- John Butler
- William Caldwell
- Simon Girty
- Robert Rogers

== Native Americans ==
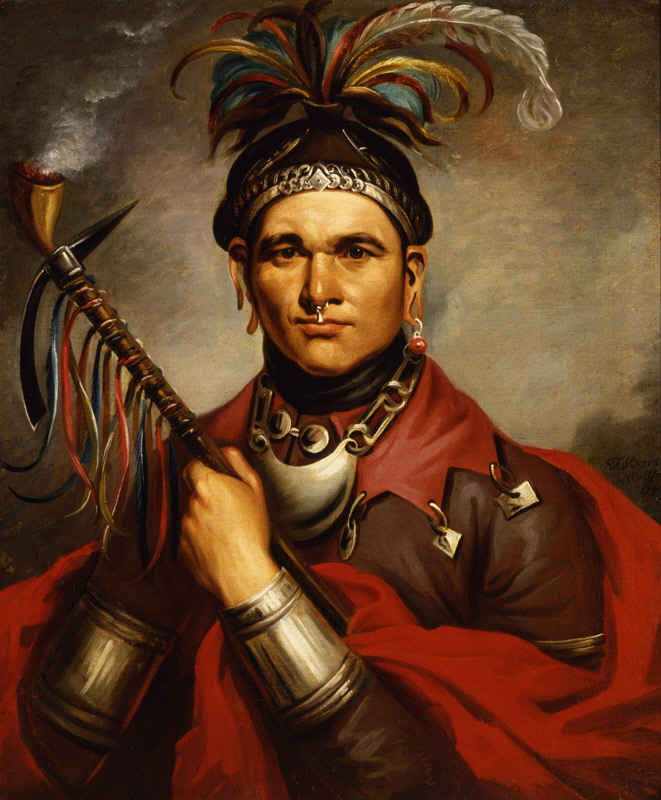
Chief Cornplanter portrait by F. Bertoli, 1796

The following Native American leaders from various nations took part in the American Revolution:

Oneida

- Han Yerry Tewahangaraghkan

Chickamauga Cherokee

- Dragging Canoe

Lenape

- Buckongahelas
- Captain Pipe
- White Eyes
- Gelelemend

Miami

- Little Turtle

Mohawk people

- Joseph Brant
- John Deseronto
- Joseph Louis Cook

Ojibwe

- Matchekewis

Odawa

- Egushawa

Seneca people

- Cornplanter
- Guyasuta
- Little Beard
- Red Jacket
- Sayenqueraghta

Cayuga people

- Fish Carrier

Shawnee people

- Blue Jacket
- Black Fish
- Black Hoof
- Black Snake
- Cornstalk
- Moluntha

Sioux

- Wapasha

Wyandot people

- Dunquat

== German principalities' forces hired by Great Britain ==
Great Britain hired the services of military troops from a number of German dominions of the Holy Roman Empire. The largest number arrived in 1776 pursuant to agreements signed in late 1775 or early 1776, but additional forces were recruited in 1778, with only limited success. The single largest contingent came from Hesse-Kassel, hence the term "Hessians".

- Anhalt-Zerbst: Colonel Johann von Rauschenplatt commanded the single regiment from Anhalt-Zerbst.
- Ansbach-Bayreuth: Colonel Friedrich Ludwig Albrecht von Eyb commanded a regiment of Ansbach infantry, and led the brigade consisting of his regiment and one from Bayreuth that included an artillery company, until May 1778.
- Ansbach-Bayreuth: Colonel Friedrich August Valentin Voit von Salzburg commanded the Ansbach brigade after Eyb's departure.
- Braunschweig-Lüneburg (Brunswick): Major General Friedrich Adolf Riedesel commanded the Brunswick troops in North America. As part of John Burgoyne's army, they were surrendered at the end of the failed Saratoga campaign. Riedesel was released to Quebec in 1781, where he served in that province's defense until his return to Europe in 1784.
- Electorate of Hanover: Lieutenant General August de la Motte commanded three regiments of Hanoverian troops that King George III, in his capacity as Elector of Hanover, ordered to Gibraltar, where they participated in the Great Siege of Gibraltar.
- Electorate of Hanover: Colonel Carl Ludwig Reinbold commanded two regiments of Hanoverian troops that King George III, in his capacity as Elector of Hanover, ordered to India, where they participated in the Siege of Cuddalore under Hector Munro.
- Electorate of Hanover: Major General Heinrich Bernhard von Sydow commanded two regiments of Hanoverian troops that King George III, in his capacity as Elector of Hanover, ordered to Minorca.
- Hesse-Kassel: Lieutenant General Leopold Philip von Heister was the first leader of the Hessian troops, and was active in the New York campaign in 1776. Differences with British General William Howe led him to depart after the disastrous Battle of Trenton.
- Hesse-Kassel: Lieutenant General Wilhelm von Knyphausen replaced von Heister, and continued to lead the Hessian forces under Howe, and later Sir Henry Clinton, in the Philadelphia campaign. While being senior to all British generals beside the C-I-C he was not listed as a possible replacement for him. He left due to poor health in 1782.
- Hesse-Kassel: Friedrich Wilhelm von Lossberg succeeded Knyphausen as commander of the Hessians until their departure at the end of the war.
- Hesse-Hanau: Wilhelm von Gall commanded the infantry regiment provided by Hesse-Hanau. He served under Riedesel in the Saratoga campaign, spending most of the war as a prisoner after Burgoyne's surrender.
- Hesse-Hanau: Georg Pausch commanded the Hesse-Hanau artillery. In the Battle of Valcour Island the Hesse-Hanau artillery participated with two gunboats. In 1777 he served under General John Burgoyne in the Saratoga campaign and became a prisoner after Burgoyne's surrender.
- Waldeck: Johann von Hanxleden was a colonel who led the single regiment that Waldeck provided. Under his command, the regiment served in Howe's army in New York and New Jersey until 1778, when it was transferred to West Florida. He was killed in a failed attack on Mobile in 1781.
- Waldeck: Albrecht von Horn was the lieutenant colonel of the Waldeck regiment, who assumed command after Hanxleden's death. After the fall of Pensacola, the Waldeck regiment's remnants were paroled to New York.

== France ==
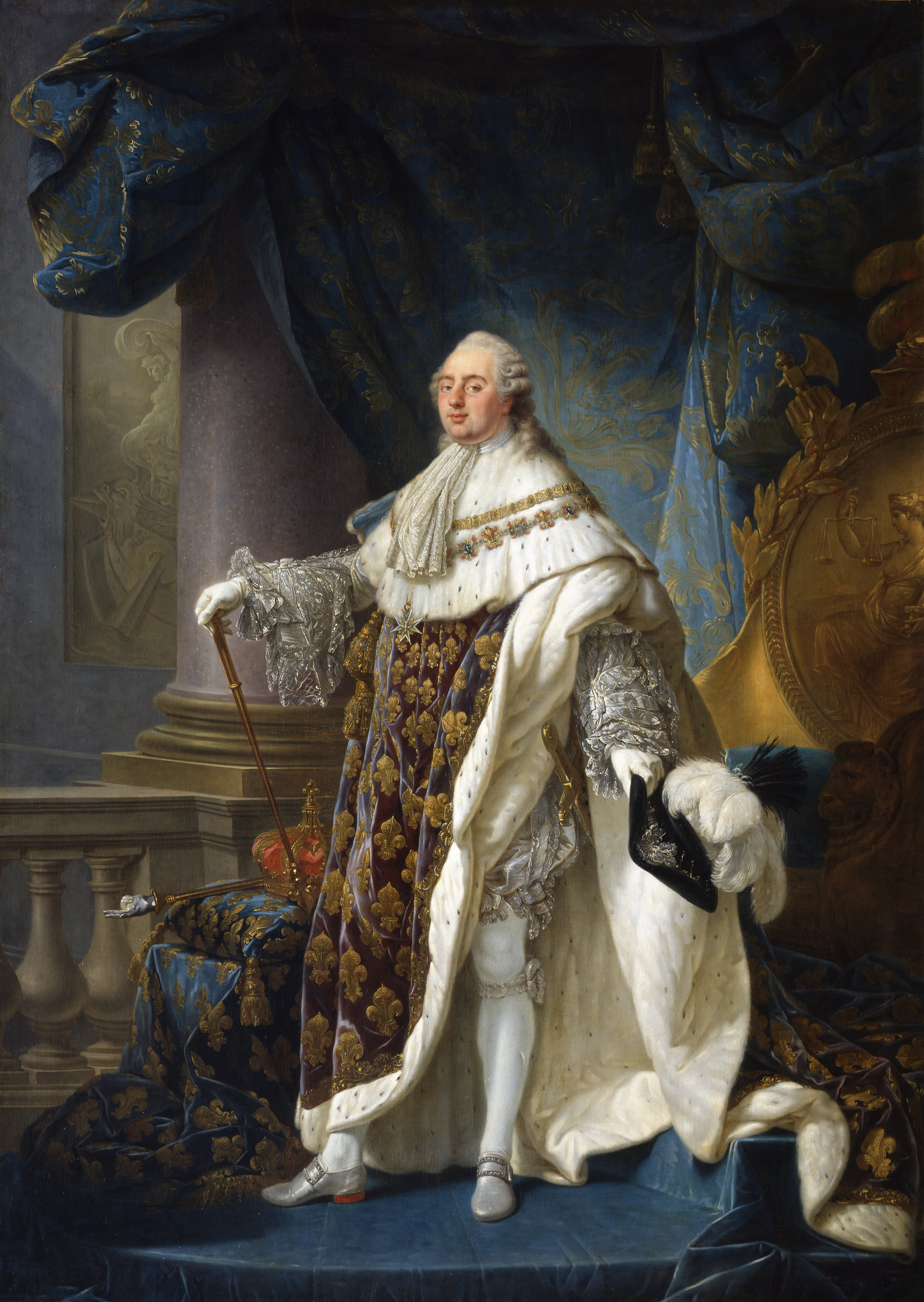
Louis XVI

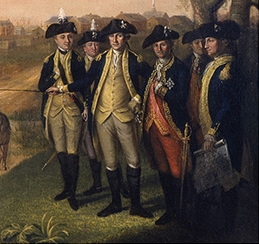
Detail from Washington and his generals at Yorktown (c. 1781) by Charles Willson Peale. Lafayette (far left) is at Washington's right, the Comte de Rochambeau to his immediate left

France made a formal treaty of alliance with the United States in 1778. France sent ground forces to fight with the Continental Army. The French Navy played a key role in the victory of the Continental Army and French Army's victory over the British army, trapped in at Yorktown, Virginia, essentially ending the war in North America in October 1781. The war between France and Great Britain continued in other theaters, including the Caribbean West Indies, the Mediterranean, and India.

=== Government leaders ===
- King Louis XVI, the absolute ruler of France, ascended to the throne in 1774. He acted as his own head of government, but depended on a circle of official and unofficial advisors for advice and support. He formally directed France's overall war effort.
- Charles Gravier, comte de Vergennes was the French foreign minister, and one of King Louis' closest advisors. He was instrumental in bringing both France and Spain into the war.
- Antoine de Sartine was France's naval minister from 1774 to 1780. Before the war he took important steps to reorganize the French navy, giving port and fleet commanders more power.
- Charles Eugène Gabriel de La Croix, marquis de Castries replaced Sartine as naval minister.
- Louis Jean Marie de Bourbon, Duke of Penthièvre was the admiral of the fleet, a largely ceremonial post usually held by a noble. Penthièvre was a lieutenant general, but had no naval experience.
- Claude Louis, Comte de Saint-Germain was France's war minister from 1775 to 1777.
- Alexandre Marie Léonor de Saint-Mauris de Montbarrey was France's war minister from 1778 to 1780.
- Philippe Henri, marquis de Ségur was France's war minister from 1780 to 1787.

=== Admirals ===
- Jacques-Melchior Saint-Laurent, Comte de Barras was an admiral in the French navy. He served under d'Estaing at the Battle of Rhode Island, and under de Grasse in the West Indies in 1782. His decision to remain in Newport in disobedience to orders enabled him to deliver the French siege train to Yorktown.
- Louis Antoine de Bougainville was a rear admiral (Chef d'escadre), explorer and former army officer. He commanded several ships and squadrons off the American coast and in the West Indies.
- Charles René Dominique Sochet, Chevalier Destouches was an admiral, who served on the North American station. As commander of the Newport fleet, he fought the 1781 Battle of Cape Henry.

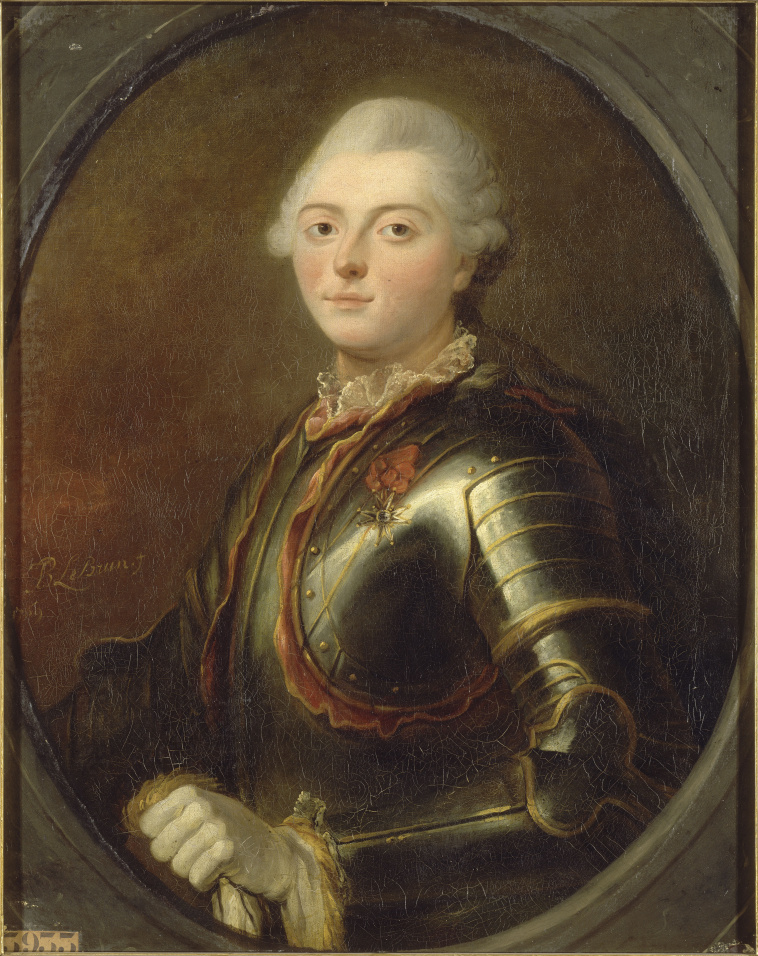
Admiral d'Estaing

- Charles Hector, comte d'Estaing was a vice-admiral in the French Navy. Active off the North American coast, he failed to support the land forces in the Battle of Rhode Island, and led French forces in the failed Siege of Savannah. He was also active in the West Indies, participating in a number of engagements there.

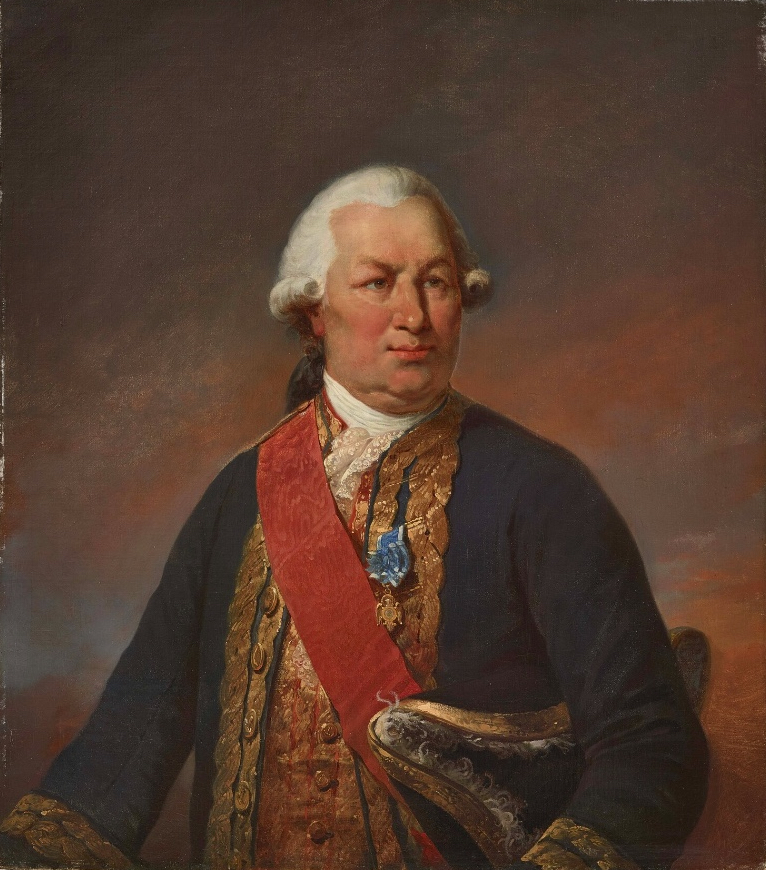
Comte de Grasse

- François Joseph Paul de Grasse, Comte de Grasse was a rear admiral of the French Navy, active in the West Indies. His fleet brought French troops to Virginia prior to the siege of Yorktown, then drew off the fleet of Thomas Graves in the Battle of the Chesapeake before providing the naval blockade of Yorktown that trapped Cornwallis in 1781. He was defeated and captured in the Battle of the Saintes in 1782.
- Luc Urbain de Bouexic, comte de Guichen was Lieutenant Général des Armées Navales (roughly equivalent to vice-admiral) in the French Navy. He was most active in the West Indies, but also saw action in the naval blockade of Gibraltar.
- François-Aymar de Monteil was an admiral. He assisted the Spanish during the siege of Pensacola, and then served under de Grasse during the 1782 campaign.
- Toussaint-Guillaume Picquet de la Motte was an admiral who served in the West Indies under d'Estaing and Guichen. His most famous feat was capturing many ships of a convoy that Admiral Rodney had sent toward England bearing loot captured after taking St. Eustatius in 1781.
- Thomas d'Estienne d'Orves was an admiral who served in the Indian Ocean. Already older when the war began, he avoided conflict with Admiral Hughes in 1779, and died in 1782 while en route from Isle de France (now Mauritius) to India with the fleet Suffren took over.
- Pierre André de Suffren de Saint Tropez, the Bailli de Suffren, after serving under d'Estaing in the West Indies, led a French fleet from France to India in 1781, and engaged five times with Admiral Edward Hughes in an evenly-matched contest for control of Indian waters in 1782 and 1783.
- Charles-Henri-Louis d'Arsac, Chevalier de Ternay was a rear admiral who commanded the naval forces of the Expédition Particulière (Special Expedition) that delivered Rochambeau's army to Newport, Rhode Island; he died aboard ship in Newport Harbor in 1780.

=== Generals ===
- Charles Joseph Patissier, Marquis de Bussy-Castelnau was a French general. He served for many years in India, and led French ground troops there in the later stages of the war.
- François-Jean de Beauvoir, Chevalier de Chastellux was a major general who served under Rochambeau in North America.
- Claude Gabriel, marquis de Choisy was a brigadier general who served under Rochambeau at Yorktown. For his leadership there, he was promoted to major general (Maréchal de camp).
- Armand Louis de Gontaut, Duc de Lauzun was briefly the commander of French army forces in North America following Rochambeau's departure in 1783. Lauzun's brigade led the French march from Rhode Island to Virginia in 1781.

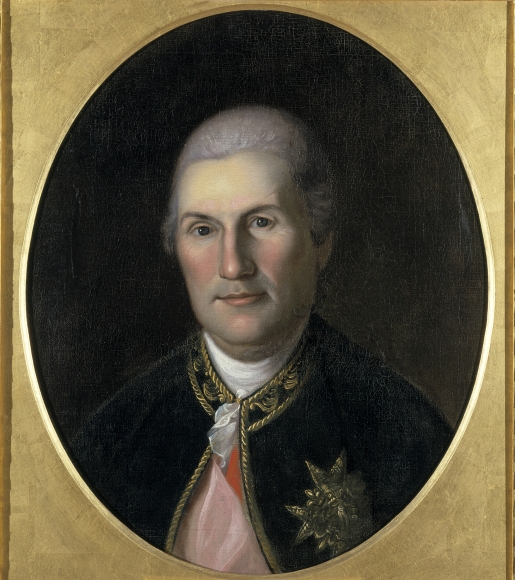
Comte de Rochambeau

- Jean-Baptiste Donatien de Vimeur, comte de Rochambeau was the commander of French army forces in North America for most of the French participation in the war. Arriving in 1779, they were largely inactive due to the successful British blockading of Rhode Island's ports. In 1781 Rochambeau led the French forces south to participate in the siege of Yorktown, and then remained to garrison southern states until 1783.
- Charles du Houx de Vioménil was a major general. He served as Rochambeau's second in command during the French Army's time in North America.
- Antoine Charles du Houx de Vioménil was a major general, and brother to Charles du Houx. He also served under Rochambeau.
- Claude-Anne de Rouvroy de Saint Simon was a major general serving in the West Indies when France entered the war. His troops sailed north with de Grasse and were present at Yorktown.

== Spain ==
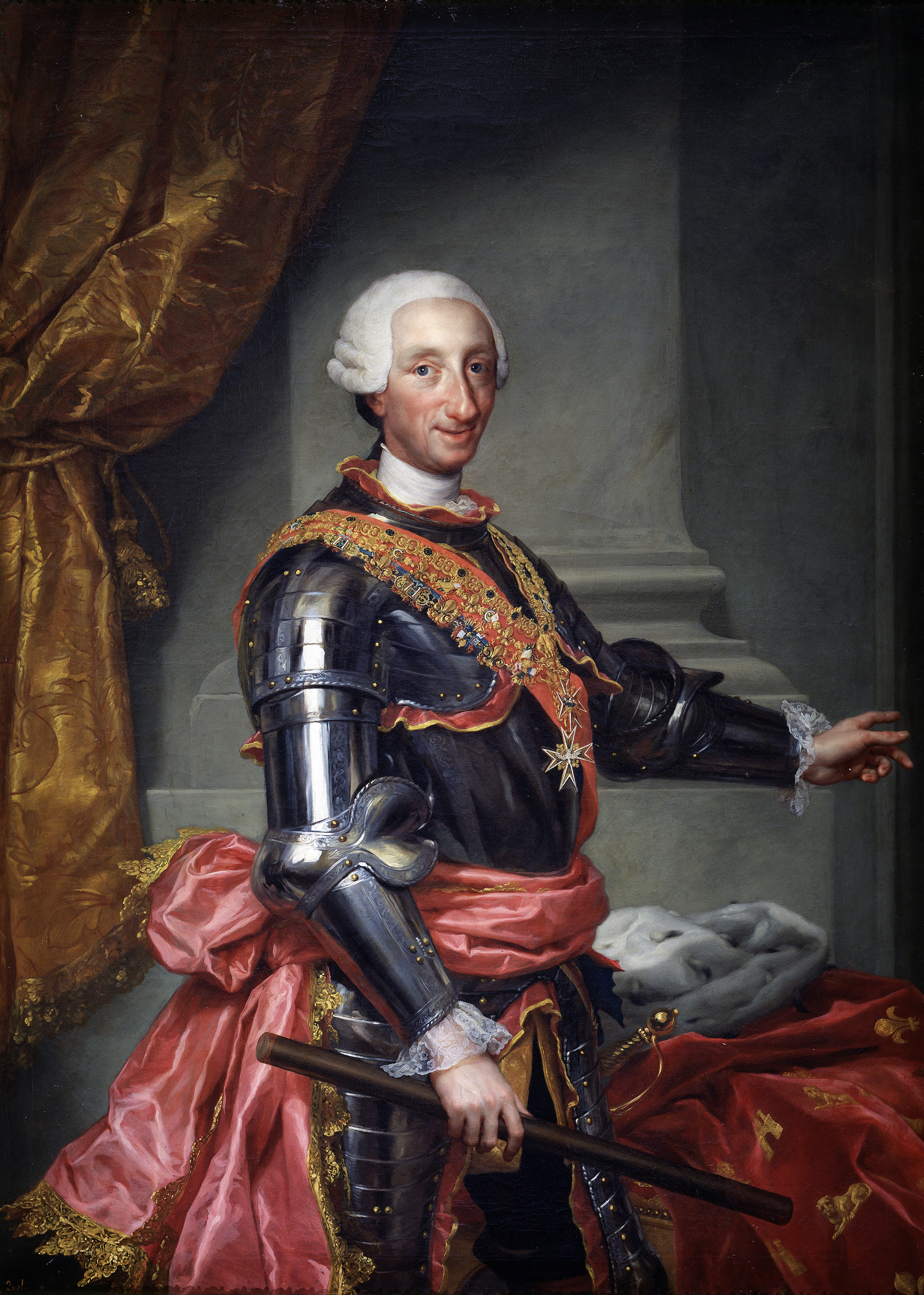
Charles III of Spain

Spain entered the conflict as an ally of France and not formally an ally of the United States. One of its main motivations in entering the war against Britain was to regain Gibraltar as well as recapture valuable sugar islands in the Caribbean and prevent further British incursions in Central America.

- Antonio Barceló was the Spanish vice-admiral responsible for the blockade of Gibraltar during its siege.
- Juan Manuel Cagigal y Monserrat was an admiral in the Spanish Navy, who provided timely reinforcements to the Spanish forces at Pensacola.
- Luis de Córdova y Córdova was an admiral in the Spanish Navy active primarily in European waters. He captured several British supply convoys but was unsuccessful in preventing a British resupply of Gibraltar following the 1782 Battle of Cape Spartel.
- Louis des Balbes de Berton de Crillon, 1st Duke of Mahón was a Frenchman who served as a general in the Spanish Army. He led Spanish forces during the Great Siege of Gibraltar and conducted the successful Franco-Spanish invasion of Minorca.
- Bernardo de Gálvez was the governor of Spanish Louisiana, and a general of the Spanish Army. He successfully drove the British military entirely from West Florida from 1779 to 1781, securing much the southern frontier of the United States against British attack. He also led Spanish forces in the seizure of Nassau in The Bahamas in 1782.
- Matías de Gálvez y Gallardo was a Spanish general and Captain General of Spanish Guatemala, which included territory that is now Honduras and Nicaragua. He was active in fighting British attempts to gain significant footholds in Central America, successfully driving most British influence from the Mosquito Coast and the island of Roatán with little assistance beyond the Spanish colonies.
- Juan de Lángara was an admiral in the Spanish Navy. He participated in the Armada of 1779 and was captured by the British in the Moonlight Battle of January 1780.
- Bonaventura Moreno was a Spanish rear admiral. He oversaw the blockade of Minorca during the 1781 invasion and commanded the floating batteries at the siege of Gibraltar.
- Jose Solano y Bote was an admiral in the Spanish Navy. For his role in assisting Bernardo de Gálvez in the capture of Pensacola, he was promoted to vice-admiral.
- Martín Álvarez de Sotomayor was a lieutenant general in the Spanish Army. He led the siege of Gibraltar until the arrival of the Duc de Crillon in 1782.

== Dutch Republic ==
The Dutch Republic played a significant economic role in the war, but its military participation was limited, in part due to internal political divisions.

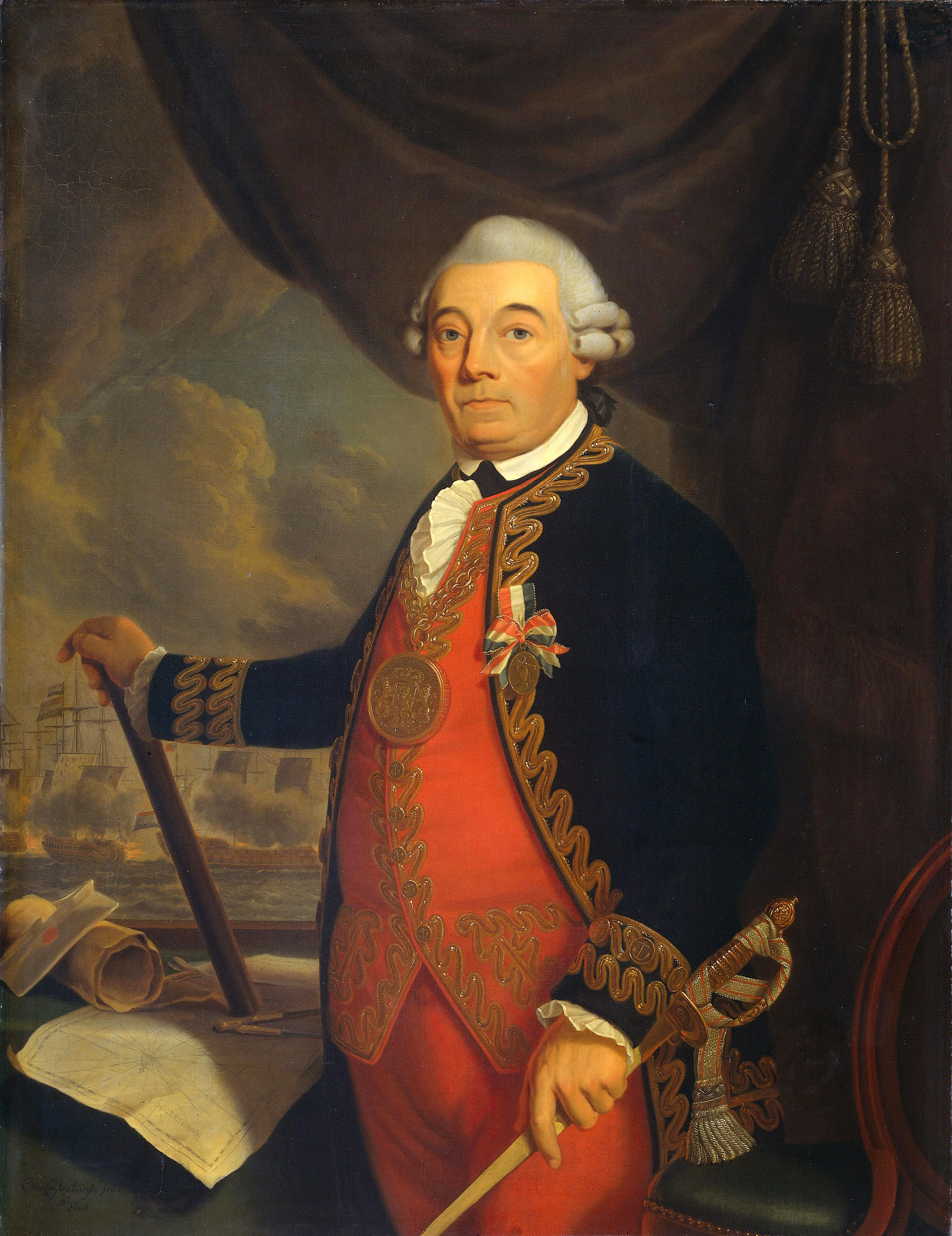
Admiral Zoutman

- Johan Zoutman was an admiral in the Dutch Navy. The navy's activities were largely ineffective, as many ships were blockaded in their home ports or captured when some of their colonial outposts were taken. Zoutman led the only notable attempt to break a convoy out of Dutch ports; he was thwarted by the British in the Battle of Dogger Bank.
- Jan Hendrik van Kinsbergen was lieutenant-admiral in the Dutch Navy. He fought in the Battle of Dogger Bank, in which the Dutch claimed victory, and was highly acclaimed by the Dutch as a naval hero.
- Reynier van Vlissingen was the governor of Negapatam, the principal outpost of the Dutch East India Company in India. He directed the unsuccessful defense of Negapatam against a British-led siege in 1781.
- Iman Willem Falck was the governor of Trincomalee, the principal outpost of the Dutch East India Company on the island of Ceylon. He directed the unsuccessful defense of that port against a British amphibious assault.
- Carel Hendrik Ver Huell was a third lieutenant in the Dutch navy. He participated in the "Affair of Fielding and Bylandt", of 30 December 1779, during which a Dutch convoy, escorted by a squadron under Admiral Bylandt, was attacked in peace time by a British squadron under Commodore Charles Fielding, and also fought in the Battle of Dogger Bank (1781), where he distinguished himself.

== Literature ==
- Black, Jeremy. War for America: The Fight for Independence, 1775–1783. St. Martin's Press (New York) and Sutton Publishing (UK), 1991. ISBN 0-312-06713-5 (1991), ISBN 0-312-12346-9 (1994 paperback), ISBN 0-7509-2808-5 (2001 paperpack).
- Boatner, Mark Mayo, III. Encyclopedia of the American Revolution. New York: McKay, 1966; revised 1974. ISBN 0-8117-0578-1.
