= James Hogun =

Irish-American general (d1781)

- Born: Ireland
- Died: January 4, 1781; Haddrel's Point, South Carolina
- Military career
- Allegiance: Continental Congress; United States of America
- Branch: Continental Army
- Service years: 1776–81
- Rank: Brigadier General
- Commands: 7th North Carolina Regiment (1776 – November 1778); Philadelphia (March 1779 – November 1779); North Carolina Line (1st Brigade) (November 1779 – May 1780)
- Conflicts: American Revolutionary War: Battle of Brandywine; Battle of Germantown; Siege of Charleston

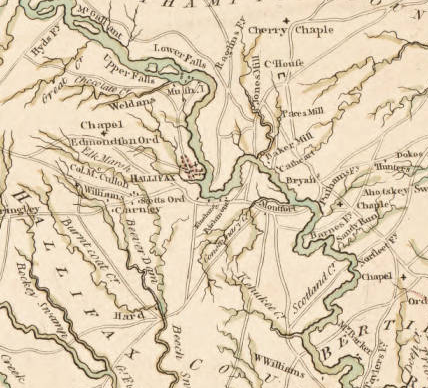
A portion of John Collet's 1770 map of North Carolina depicting the environs of Halifax and the Roanoke River

James Hogun (died January 4, 1781) was an Irish-American military officer who was one of five generals from North Carolina to serve with the Continental Army during the American Revolutionary War. Born in Ireland, Hogan migrated to North Carolina – then a British colony – in 1751. Settling in Halifax County, he raised a family and established himself as a prominent local figure.

A member of the county's Committee of Safety, he represented it at the North Carolina Provincial Congress and helped to draft the first Constitution of North Carolina. Initially a major in the 7th North Carolina Regiment, Hogun advanced quickly in rank during 1776 to become the unit's commanding officer. He participated in the battles of Brandywine and Germantown in 1777. The Continental Congress promoted Hogun to brigadier general in 1779, although several congressmen and the North Carolina General Assembly wished to see Thomas Clark of North Carolina promoted instead.

Hogun was in command of North Carolina's line brigade during the siege of Charleston in the spring of 1780, which ended in the surrender of all but one of North Carolina's regiments of regular infantry as well as more than 5,000 Patriot soldiers under Major General Benjamin Lincoln. Hogun was the highest-ranking officer from North Carolina to be captured and imprisoned after the surrender of Charleston, and despite being offered the opportunity to leave internment under a parole that was generally extended to other captured Continental officers, he remained in a British prisoner-of-war camp near Charleston. Hogun likely chose imprisonment in order to prevent the British Army from recruiting Continental soldiers for its campaign in the West Indies. He became ill and died in the prison on Haddrel's Point, a peninsula in Charleston's harbor.

== Early life ==
Much of Hogun's early life remains unknown, due to his relative obscurity until the American Revolutionary War. He immigrated to North Carolina from Ireland, his place of birth, in 1751, and on October 3 that year he married Ruth Norfleet. The couple had a son, Lemuel. Hogun made his home near the modern-day community of Hobgood in Halifax County. He owned four slaves.

In 1774, Hogun became a member of the Halifax County Committee of Safety, which indicated his rise to prominence since arriving in the colony 23 years prior. Between August, 1775, and November, 1776, Hogun represented Halifax County in the Third, Fourth, and Fifth North Carolina Provincial Congresses, and demonstrated an interest in military matters. As a delegate, Hogun assisted in drafting the first Constitution of North Carolina.

== American Revolutionary War ==
=== Initial command ===
Hogun was named a major in the 7th North Carolina Regiment in April 1776, and was given command of the unit on November 26, 1776. Initially, the regiment had some difficulty organizing after several of the officers delayed their military work in order to take care of their personal affairs. Hogun was forced to reprimand his officers sharply, threatening them with the loss of their commissions. At the same time, currents of doubt ran through North Carolina, as Loyalists attempted to hinder enlistment of Patriots by spreading rumors about the imminent demise of the Patriot army in the north, and disease that was allegedly ravaging that force.

While commanding his regiment, Hogun fought against the British Army in the battles of Brandywine and Germantown, and was present at Valley Forge in the winter of 1777–78. In 1778, Hogun was given orders to assist in recruiting the so-called "additional regiments" requested by the Continental Congress from North Carolina, and afterwards was ordered to West Point with the first regiment so recruited. After his arrival, and throughout the late autumn and winter of 1778–79, Hogun's regiment served on a work detail tasked with building up the fortifications at West Point. Hogun was not satisfied with this task, but his men lacked sufficient weapons to allow them to serve as a combat unit at that time. Approximately 400 muskets had to be requisitioned for the regiment to be fully armed.

=== Promotion and Philadelphia ===
In early 1779, Major General Benedict Arnold, then Commandant of Philadelphia, Pennsylvania, requested that General George Washington send him an additional regiment of Continental soldiers to guard the Patriot stores in Philadelphia. Hogun was sent to Arnold with his newly recruited regiment, arriving on or before January 19, 1779.

On January 9, 1779, while en route to Philadelphia, Hogun was promoted to brigadier general by the Continental Congress. His promotion came about in part as a result of what Thomas Burke, a delegate to the Continental Congress from North Carolina, and a fellow Irishman, termed the "distinguished intrepidity" Hogun had exhibited at Germantown. This caused some controversy, as the North Carolina General Assembly, which was customarily consulted for the promotion of generals from that state, had already nominated Thomas Clark and Jethro Sumner for promotion to the rank of brigadier general. Sumner was promoted, but Clark was passed over in favor of Hogun, who received the support of nine of the thirteen states. Hogun's surprising victory was due in large part to Burke's lobbying efforts among his colleagues in the Continental Congress. By political conventions governing such matters, Burke was bound by the vote of the North Carolina General Assembly to support the state legislature's recommendations of Clark and Sumner, but he worked to convince other Congressmen to vote for Hogun over Clark. Hogun was appointed to succeed Arnold as Commandant of Philadelphia on March 19, 1779, serving until November 22 that year.

=== Charleston campaign ===
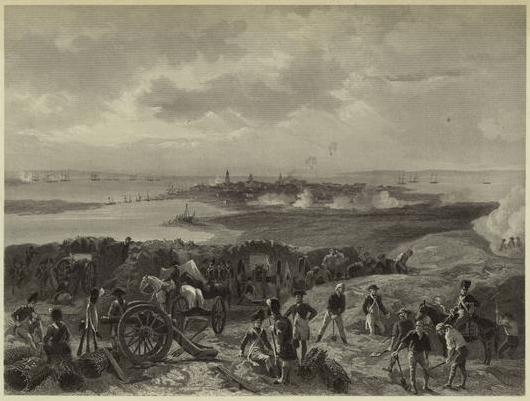
A black and white print of Alonzo Chappel's Siege of Charleston, depicting the engagement from the British perspective. Hogun's position would have been on the left of the Patriot lines from this vantage point.

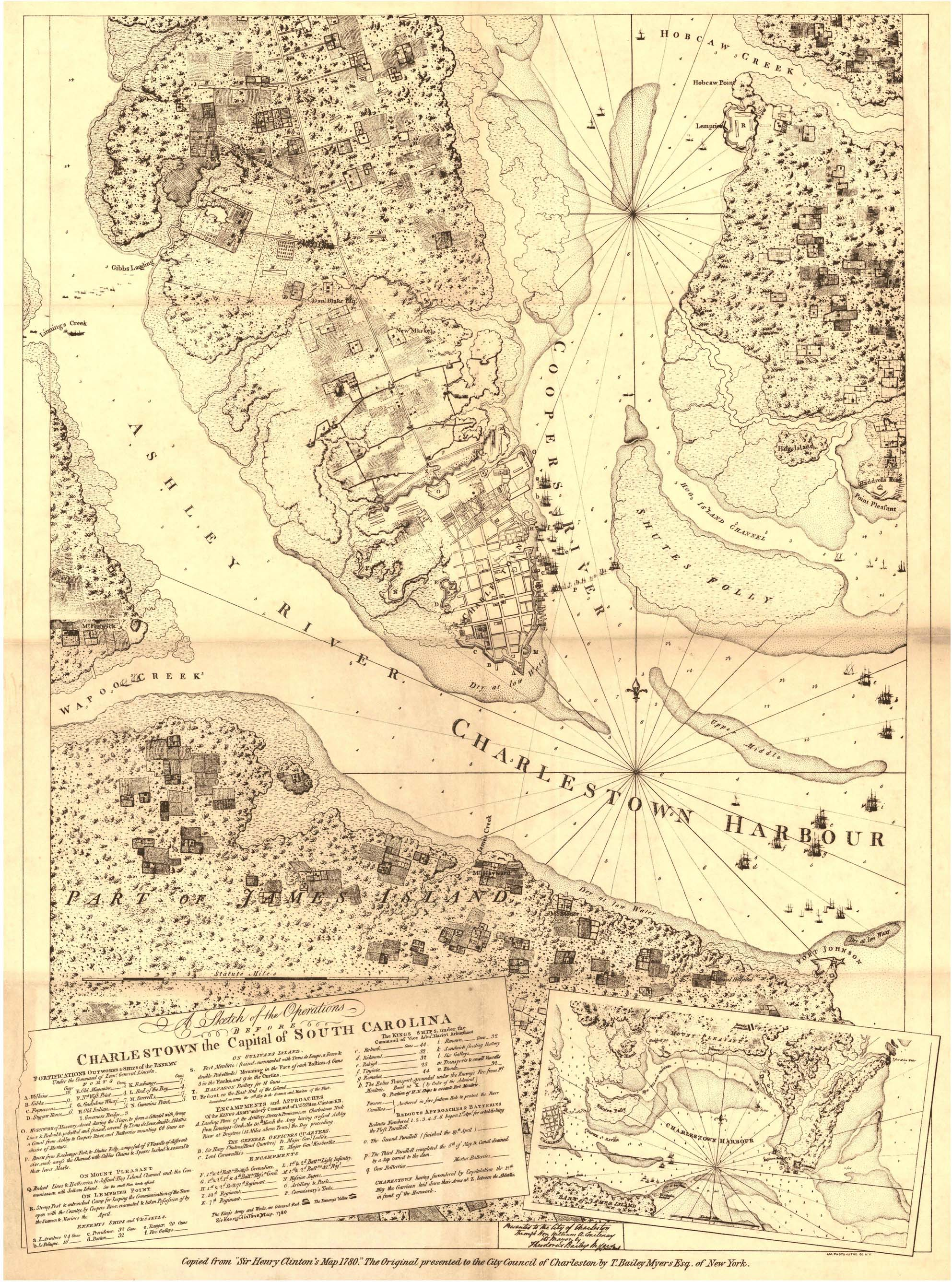
A copy of General Henry Clinton's 1780 map of the siege of Charleston, showing the location of Haddrel's Point, where Hogun died, at far right.

In November 1779, Hogun took command of the North Carolina Brigade of the North Carolina Line, composed of the 1st, 2nd, 3rd, and 4th North Carolina Regiments. Through the winter of 1779–80, Hogun led the brigade of about 700 men from Philadelphia to Charleston, South Carolina, where he was placed under the command of Major General Benjamin Lincoln. The march was arduous, and Hogun's brigade endured one of the coldest, harshest winters in years.

Hogun's command arrived at Charleston on March 13, 1780, which according to Lincoln gave "great spirit to the Town, and confidence to the Army." The North Carolinians were immediately put to the task of defending the city, which was threatened with a siege by British General Henry Clinton in early March. Shortly after Hogun's arrival, many of North Carolina's militia present in the city began to return home because their enlistment terms ended on or about March 24. The militiamen had only agreed to serve limited terms, and as they were not under Hogun's direct command he was powerless to stop them leaving.

Charleston was principally located on a peninsula, and so Lincoln aligned his Continental units in defensive works that barricaded the "neck" of the peninsula, using a line of redoubts, redans, and batteries. These defensive works were connected by a parapet, and commanded from a concrete hornwork jutting out from the defensive line. In front of the fortifications, the Patriot forces dug an 18-foot-wide moat, and between the moat and parapet they constructed a line of abatis to stall any British assault. When the siege by the British Army began in earnest on April 1, Hogun and his men were positioned on the right of the Continental Army's lines, near the Cooper River.

Hogun participated in a council of war on April 20, 1780. Several members of the South Carolina Privy Council, a part of the civilian government, threatened to block the Continental Army's attempts to withdraw from Charleston, if the council of war voted to do so. Although the defending army had only eight to ten days worth of provisions, Lincoln bowed to pressure from civil authorities and delayed evacuation. On April 26, another council of war at which Hogun was present determined that the British presence on all sides of the city prevented the army's escape. For the next two weeks, the British and Patriot forces exchanged artillery and rifle fire at all times of day, and the British bombardment whittled down the American breastworks.

On May 8, Lincoln called another council of war with all his army's general and field officers and ships' captains to discuss terms of surrender that had been proposed by Clinton. Of the 61 officers in attendance at that council, 49, including Hogun, voted to offer terms of capitulation with the British commander. When these were rejected, hostilities continued, and Lincoln called another council of war on May 11 to further discuss terms of capitulation. The council voted to present further terms to Clinton, which he accepted. On May 12, 1780, Hogun was among the officers under Lincoln who formally surrendered to the British Army, along with approximately 5,000 Continental and militia soldiers. The surrender led to the loss of all but one of the regiments of the North Carolina Line then in existence, depriving the state of all regular, non-militia soldiers. As a brigadier general, Hogun held the highest rank of the approximately 814 Continental soldiers from North Carolina who capitulated at Charleston.

=== Imprisonment and death ===
Rather than allowing himself to be paroled, Hogun requested he be taken prisoner, and was interned at the British prison camp at Haddrel's Point on Point Pleasant, located in what is now Mount Pleasant, South Carolina, across from Sullivan's Island. Hogun's decision was based, in part, on his desire to stifle the recruiting efforts of the British, who sought to enlist captured Continental soldiers to serve in the British West Indies. The British, however, held only the officers at Haddrel's Point, deciding to house the enlisted men in barracks in Charleston.

Officers at Haddrel's Point were subjected to harsh treatment, barred from fishing to catch much-needed food, and threatened with deportation from South Carolina. Approximately 3,300 Patriot soldiers were confined in prison camps around Charleston that were similar to the one at Haddrel's Point, and many were destined for cramped, unsanitary prison ships. Because of the conditions, many Continental soldiers agreed to join Loyalist regiments, but Hogun and other officers set up courts martial in the camps and attempted to maintain a dignified military structure. Hogun's health soon declined, and he died in the prison camp on January 4, 1781. He was buried in an unmarked grave.

== Legacy ==
On March 14, 1786, the North Carolina legislature granted Hogun's son, Lemuel, a 12,000-acre (4,900 ha; 19 sq mi) tract near modern-day Nashville, Tennessee, in recognition of his father's service. The elder Hogun was one of twenty-two Patriot generals who perished during the American Revolutionary War, and one of twelve who died from disease or other non-combat causes. In the early 20th century, North Carolina jurist and historian Walter Clark noted that while the careers of three of North Carolina's other generals – Brigadier Generals Francis Nash and James Moore, and Major General Robert Howe – were well known to contemporary historians, the story of Hogun's career as well as that of Jethro Sumner had been neglected.

Hogun's personal papers appear to have been destroyed while in the possession of his descendants in Alabama during the American Civil War, leaving virtually no surviving correspondence that would shed further light on his life. In 1954, the North Carolina Highway Historical Marker Program, a division of the North Carolina Department of Cultural Resources, erected a historical marker in Hogun's honor near his former home in Halifax County.
