= 2nd North Carolina Regiment =

- Active: 1775–1783
- Allegiance: (United States) Continental Congress
- Type: Infantry
- Size: 8, 9 or 10 companies
- Part of: North Carolina Line
- Engagements: Burning of Norfolk (1776); Battle of Sullivan's Island (1776); Battle of Brandywine (1777); Battle of Germantown (1777); Battle of Monmouth (1778); Siege of Charleston (1780); Battle of Eutaw Springs (1781)

Commanders
- Notable commanders: Colonel Robert Howe (1775); Colonel Alexander Martin (1776-1777); Colonel John Patten (1777-1783)

The 2nd North Carolina Regiment was an American infantry unit that was raised for the Continental Army during the American Revolutionary War. In 1776 the regiment helped defend Charleston, South Carolina. Ordered to join George Washington's main army in February 1777, the regiment subsequently fought at Brandywine and Germantown during the Philadelphia Campaign. After most other North Carolina regiments were sent home to recruit, the 1st and 2nd Regiments remained with the main army and fought at Monmouth in June 1778. The regiment was transferred to the Southern Department and was captured by the British army in May 1780 at the Siege of Charleston. Together with the 1st Regiment, the unit was rebuilt and fought capably at Eutaw Springs. The 2nd was furloughed in April 1783 and officially dissolved in November 1783.

== History ==
The 2nd North Carolina Regiment was authorized by the North Carolina Provincial Congress on 1 September 1775 as a Provincial and State Troops (not militia).

The original officers included

- Robert Howe Esqr, Colonel (commander in 1775)
- Alexander Martin, Lt Colonel (colonel and commander in 1776-1777)
- John Patten Esq., Major (colonel and commander in 1777-1783)
- Dr. Jno. White, 1st Capt. and Adjutant

Lieutenants:

- John Grainger
- Clement Hall
- William Fenner
- Benjamin Williams
- Robert Smith
- Edward Vail, Jr.
- John Williams
- John Herritage
- Joseph Tate
- James Gee

Captains:

- James Blount
- Michael Payne
- Simon Bright
- John Armstrong
- Henry Irwin Toole
- Hardy Murfree
- Charles Crawford
- Nathaniel Keais
- John Walker

Ensigns:

- Henry Vipon
- Whitmill Pugh
- John Oliver
- Philip Low
- James Cook
- John Woodhouse
- William Gardner
- William Caswell
- Benjamin Cleveland

Sergeants:

- William Boswell

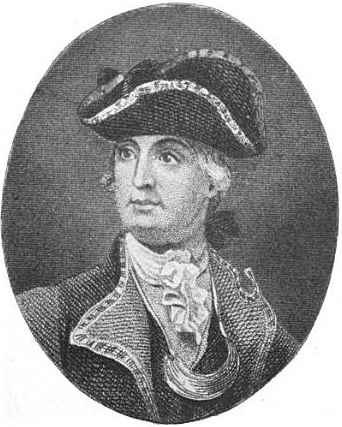
Maj Gen Robert Howe

Ten companies were organized at Edenton, New Bern, and Salisbury, North Carolina, during the autumn of 1775. At the end of 1775, Colonel Howe marched his regiment north to Virginia. Arriving near Norfolk, Virginia, on 14 December 1775, Howe provoked a British attack on the town on 1 January 1776 which resulted in the Burning of Norfolk and the withdrawal of Lord Dunmore's forces. On 4 January 1776, the 2nd Regiment was reorganized in the strength of eight companies. The unit was assigned to the Southern Department on 27 February 1776. The 1st, 2nd, and 3rd North Carolina Regiments participated in the successful defense of Charleston that culminated in the Battle of Sullivan's Island. At the time, the three regiments were only half of their nominal strength. The early successes of local militia over American loyalists and Indians convinced many southerners that professional soldiers were not required for defense. Therefore, the Continental Army regiments received less support than was seen in the northern colonies.

The 2nd North Carolina was transferred to the main continental army on 5 February 1777. The unit became part of the North Carolina Brigade on 8 July 1777. When the North Carolina Brigade arrived near Philadelphia, Pennsylvania, it was so badly understrength that the field officers suggested transferring all the soldiers into the three senior regiments. However, this was not done until the following May when the other regiments were reduced to cadres and sent home to recruit. The 2nd Regiment saw action at the Battle of Brandywine on 11 September 1777. The North Carolina Brigade, under Brigadier General Francis Nash was deployed in reserve near Chadds Ford. Late in the afternoon, after Sir William Howe's flanking column had broken the American right wing, Washington directed Nathanael Greene's division and Nash's brigade to block the British thrust. Though the battle resulted in an American defeat, Howe's advance was brought to a halt in a fierce musketry duel and Washington's army limped away to fight again.

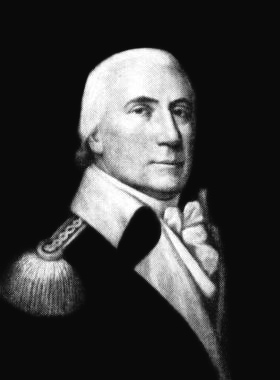
Col. Alexander Martin

At the Battle of Germantown on 4 October 1777, the North Carolina Brigade and William Maxwell's New Jersey Brigade were part of Lord Stirling's Reserve Division. During the advance, a cannonball killed one of Maxwell's aides and mortally wounded Nash. Presently, Lord Stirling's column found itself confronted by about 100 British soldiers in the Chew House. After a bombardment by cannon failed to reduce the structure, two New Jersey regiments tried to storm the place. The North Carolina troops fired on the north side of the house in support, but all American attacks were repulsed with heavy losses. During the 1777–1778 winter encampment at Valley Forge, Brigadier General Lachlan McIntosh took command of the North Carolina Brigade. Colonel John Patten, Lieutenant Colonel Selby Harney, and Major Hardy Murfree were the field officers in the 2nd North Carolina.

The regiment fought at the Battle of Monmouth and the Siege of Charleston. The regiment would be captured by the British Army at Charlestown, South Carolina, on May 12, 1780. The regiment was reformed in the summer of 1781, furloughed January 1, 1783, at James Island, South Carolina and disbanded on November 15, 1783.
