= William Lee Davidson =

American revolution militia general (1746–1781)

William Lee Davidson, Sr.
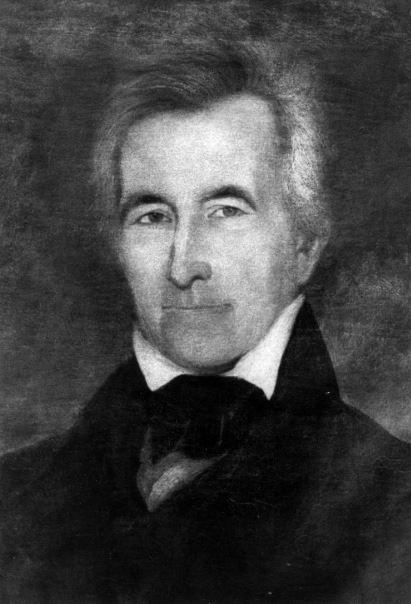
- Possible portrait of William Lee Davidson, Sr. or Jr.
- Born: 1746; Lancaster County, Pennsylvania, British America
- Died: February 1, 1781 (aged 34–35); Mecklenburg County, North Carolina, U.S.
- Burial place: Hopewell Presbyterian Church, Huntersville, North Carolina
- Military career
- Allegiance: United States
- Branch: Continental Army; North Carolina Militia
- Service years: 1775–1781
- Rank: Colonel, Brigadier General (Pro Tempore)
- Units: Rowan County Regiment; 3rd, 4th, 5th, and 7th North Carolina Regiments
- Conflicts: American Revolutionary War; Snow Campaign; Battle of Brandywine; Battle of Germantown; Battle of Colson's Mill; Battle of Cowan's Ford †

Signature
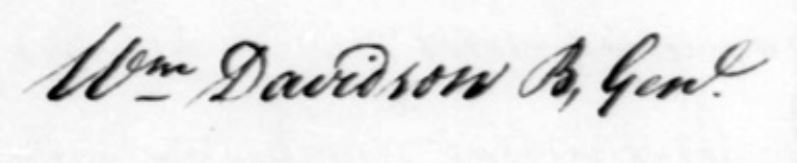

William Lee Davidson (1746–1781) was an officer in the North Carolina militia and Continental Army during the American Revolutionary War. He was born in Pennsylvania and moved with his family to Rowan County, North Carolina in 1750. He was killed at the Battle of Cowan's Ford.

== Origins and education ==
William Lee Davidson was born in 1746 in Lancaster County, Province of Pennsylvania. His father George Davidson moved with his family to Rowan County, Province of North Carolina in 1750. William, the youngest son, was educated at Queen's Museum (later Liberty Hall) in Charlotte.

== Military service ==
Service record:

- Adjutant/Captain in the 1st Rowan County regiment of militia (1775-1776)
- Major in the 1st Rowan County Regiment of militia (1776)
- Major in the 4th North Carolina Regiment (North Carolina Continental Line) (1776-1777)
- Lt. Colonel in the 5th North Carolina Regiment (North Carolina Continental Line) (1777)
- Lt. Colonel in the 7th North Carolina Regiment (North Carolina Continental Line) (1777-1778)
- Lt. Colonel in the 3rd North Carolina Regiment (North Carolina Continental Line) (1778)
- Lt. Colonel over the 1st North Carolina Regiment (North Carolina Continental Line) (1779-1780)
- Brigadier General (Pro Tempore) over the Salisbury District Brigade of the North Carolina militia (September 1780 to February 1781)

Active in the war from its inception as adjutant to Colonel (later Brigadier General) Griffith Rutherford's Rowan County Regiment during the Snow Campaign in December 1775, he was promoted to major of the Fourth Regiment of the North Carolina line in 1776. He marched with the North Carolina line to the north and was at the Battle of Germantown, after which he was promoted to Lt. Colonel of the Fifth Regiment of the North Carolina line. At Valley Forge with Washington, "Light Horse Harry" Lee, Daniel Morgan and others, he became friends with most of the influential military commanders in the Continental Line.

Left without a command, he had been ordered out for the purpose of preventing the British from crossing the Catawba. Griffith Rutherford appointed Davidson his second in command. Severely wounded at the Battle of Colson's Mill on July 21, 1780, he did not participate in the Battle of Camden at which Rutherford was captured. Davidson was promoted to brigadier general and given command of Rutherford's Salisbury District Brigade of militia. He participated in resisting the entry of Lord Cornwallis into Charlotte in late September 1780.

Brigadier General William Lee Davidson was in Charlotte, North Carolina by December 3, 1780, the day after General Nathanael Greene arrived in Charlottetown as it was then called. After the defeat of the American Forces at the Battle of Camden or as called by most veterans in their pension records the Battle of Gum Swamp; so it was then that the Continental Congress finally agreed to permit General George Washington to replace General Gates with his best officer.

General Washington immediately selected General Nathanael Greene. General Greene arrived later in the day on December 2, 1780, in Charlottetown after a long journey from Philadelphia, Pennsylvania, and rested. Officially the Change of Command Ceremony took place between General Gates and General Greene on December 3, 1780; and as quickly as he could General Nathanael Greene got to the business at hand to meet his new officers in the field. General William Lee Davidson and General Nathanael Greene had previously met. They were both in the Battle of Brandywine opposing British General Lord Cornwallis in Pennsylvania.

Greene recognized that Davidson was very respected and in favor with the local militia in the western half of North Carolina, called the Salisbury Military District over which General Davidson had complete jurisdiction. Greene wanted to capitalize on the opportunity to create a "Flying Army" that was approved by General Washington. Davidson was going to be the leading Patriot Commander in the field to raise the local militia up as this "Flying Army." Having previously served in battle and camped at Valley Forge together, they already had a bond of trust.

== Death ==
Davidson was killed at the Battle of Cowan's Ford in Mecklenburg County, North Carolina on February 1, 1781, while opposing the re-entry of Cornwallis into North Carolina. General Davidson was trying to rally his men as the lead British and German elements arrived on the near bank. He was killed within minutes as the engagement unfolded. Davidson's body was recovered by fellow officers later that evening after the battle; and was buried at Hopewell Presbyterian Church located on Beatties Ford Road, North of Charlotte.

== Namesakes ==
- Davidson County, North Carolina and Davidson County, Tennessee.
- The town of Davidson, North Carolina.
- Davidson College in North Carolina. His sword once hung in one of its halls.

Congress voted $500 for a monument to him, but it has never been erected.
