= Thomas Clark (North Carolina soldier) =

American Revolutionary war army officer

- Born: August 1741; Wilmington, North Carolina
- Died: December 25, 1792 (aged 51)
- Military career
- Allegiance: United States
- Branch: North Carolina Line
- Service years: 1775–1783
- Rank: Colonel (Continental Army); Brigadier General (state)
- Unit: 1st North Carolina Regiment
- Conflicts: Battle of Moore's Creek Bridge; Battle of Sullivan's Island; Battle of Brandywine; Battle of Germantown; Battle of Barren Hill; Battle of Monmouth; Siege of Charleston
- Other work: Society of the Cincinnati

Thomas Clark (August 1741 – 25 December 1792) was an officer who served in the War of the Regulation in North Carolina and in the 1st North Carolina Regiment, North Carolina Line of the Continental Army during the American Revolutionary War. He was promoted to brigadier general after the war.

== Early life (1741–1775) ==
Thomas Clark was born in August 1741 in Wilmington, North Carolina to Thomas Clark, a merchant, and Barbara Murray. He also had a sister, Ann, who married William Hooper.

Clark went to school in England, where he learned to be a watchmaker, He practiced this trade in Boston until 1769 where he settled to Cape Fear to take care of the estate of his uncle, James Murray.

In 1771, Clark participated in the War of the Regulation, first as a "provost marshal general," followed by being the aide-de-camp. He participated and subsequently wounded in the Battle of Alamance, which was a rebellion in colonial North Carolina over issues of taxation and local control.

In 1772, Clark was acting clerk of superior court for the Hillsborough District. His home, however, was at Point Repose Plantation, which had been bought by James Murray in 1739. Point Repose was purchased by Clark in 1783 after it had been confiscated by the state and sold as Loyalist property.

== Military career (1775–1783) ==
On 1 September 1775 he was elected major of the 1st North Carolina Regiment. He was promoted to lieutenant colonel on 10 April 1776 and led the regiment at the Battle of Sullivan's Island in June of that year. Elevated in rank to colonel of the 1st North Carolina Regiment on 5 February 1777, he led the unit at Brandywine and Germantown in the late summer and fall of 1777. He was given command of the 5th North Carolina Regiment in 1779.

Clark was present at Barren Hill and commanded the North Carolina Brigade at the Battle of Monmouth on 28 June 1778. After the action, he sat on the court martial that convicted Charles Lee. He was passed over for promotion to brigadier general, with Jethro Sumner and James Hogun being raised to that rank in January 1779. After operations around New York City, Clark joined the march of Hogun's North Carolina Brigade to Charleston, South Carolina, arriving on 3 April 1780. He was captured by the British on 12 May 1780 at the end of the Siege of Charleston. After his imprisonment, he was so ill that he resigned on 1 January 1783 from the Continental Army. In 1782 he married Sarah Nash, the widow of Francis Nash, who was killed at Germantown, but she died a year later.

Service record

- Major in the 1st North Carolina Regiment (NC Continental Line) (1775–1776)
- Lt. Colonel in the 1st North Carolina Regiment (1776–1777)
- Colonel over the 1st North Carolina Regiment (1777–1778) and (1780–1783)
- Colonel over the 5th North Carolina Regiment (1779)

== Later life (1783–1792) ==
He received a promotion to brigadier general from the state legislature on 30 September 1783. After the war he was founding vice-president of the North Carolina Society of the Cincinnati. Plagued by ill health, he became blind and remained an invalid until he died at Point Repose Plantation, which he had acquired from his uncle James Murray. He died on 25 December 1792.
