= 7th North Carolina Regiment =

- Active: 1776-1778
- Allegiance: (United States) Continental Congress
- Type: Infantry
- Part of: North Carolina Line
- Engagements: Battle of Brandywine (1777); Battle of Germantown (1777); Battle of White Marsh (1777)

Commanders
- Notable commanders: Colonel James Hogun

The 7th North Carolina Regiment was raised on 16 September 1776 at Halifax, North Carolina for service with the Continental Army. Colonel James Hogun was appointed the regimental commander in November 1776. The 7th Regiment was initially assigned to the Southern Department but in February 1777 the unit transferred to George Washington's main army. In July 1777, the regiment was assigned to the North Carolina Brigade which was led by Francis Nash. All the North Carolina regiments were badly understrength, with only two mustering over 200 men. The regiment saw action at the battles of Brandywine and Germantown and it was present at White Marsh. Together with the 8th, 9th, and 10th North Carolina Regiments, the 7th Regiment was disbanded on 1 June 1778 at Valley Forge, Pennsylvania. The rank and file were consolidated with the three senior regiments and the superfluous officers were sent back to North Carolina to recruit new regiments.
