= 3rd North Carolina Regiment =

- Active: 1776–1783
- Allegiance: (United States) Continental Congress
- Branch: Continental Army
- Type: Infantry
- Part of: North Carolina Line
- Engagements: Battle of Sullivan's Island (1776); Battle of Brandywine (1777); Battle of Germantown (1777); Battle of White Marsh (1777); Siege of Charleston (1780)

Commanders
- Notable commanders: Colonel Jethro Sumner; Lieutenant Colonel Robert Mebane; Lieutenant Colonel John Armstrong

The 3rd North Carolina Regiment was raised on 16 January 1776 at Wilmington, North Carolina for service with the Continental Army. In April, Jethro Sumner was appointed colonel. The regiment was present at the defense of Charleston in June 1776. The 3rd Regiment transferred from the Southern Department to George Washington's main army in February 1777. Assigned to Francis Nash's North Carolina Brigade in July 1777, it soon saw action at the battles of Brandywine and Germantown, and was present at White Marsh. Sumner went home ill in early 1778. Together with the 4th, 5th, and 6th North Carolina Regiments, the 3rd Regiment was reduced to a cadre and sent home to recruit up to strength on 1 June 1778. The rebuilt regiment returned to the main army in late 1778, but it was reduced to a cadre again in April 1779 and sent back to its home state. Assigned to the North Carolina Brigade, the regiment fought at the Siege of Charleston where it was captured by the British Army on 12 May 1780. The regiment was officially disbanded on 15 November 1783.

== Officers ==
Commanders:

- Colonel Jethro Exum Sumner (1776 – 1779)
- Lieutenant Colonel Robert Mebane (1779 – 1781)
- Lieutenant Colonel John Armstrong (1781 – 1782)

== Engagements ==
Companies of this unit were engaged in the following battles, sieges, and skirmishes:

- June 28, 1776, Fort Moultrie #1 in South Carolina
- September 1776, Florida Expedition
- September 11, 1777, Battle of Brandywine Creek in Pennsylvania
- October 4, 1777, Battle of Germantown in Pennsylvania
- June 28, 1778, Battle of Monmouth in New Jersey
- March 28 to May 12, 1780, Siege of Charleston 1780 in South Carolina
- August 11, 1780, Little Lynches Creek (SC) (1 unit) in North Carolina
- August 16, 1780, Battle of Camden (SC) (1 unit) in North Carolina
- March 15, 1781, Battle of Guilford Court House (1 unit) in North Carolina
- April 25, 1781, Battle of Hobkirk's Hill in South Carolina
- September 8, 1781, Battle of Eutaw Springs in South Carolina
