= 1st North Carolina Regiment =

- Active: 1775-1783
- Country: United States
- Allegiance: (United States) Continental Congress
- Type: Infantry
- Part of: North Carolina Line
- Engagements: Battle of Moore's Creek Bridge (1776); Battle of Sullivan's Island (1776); Battle of Brandywine (1777); Battle of Germantown (1777); Battle of White Marsh (1777); Battle of Monmouth (1778); Siege of Charleston (1780); Battle of Eutaw Springs (1781)

Commanders
- Notable commanders: Colonel James Moore (1775-1776); Colonel Francis Nash (1776-1777); Colonel Thomas Clark (1777-1778, 1780-1783); Lt Col William Lee Davidson (1779-1780)

The 1st North Carolina Regiment of the Continental Army was raised on September 1, 1775, at Wilmington, North Carolina (originally authorized by the North Carolina Provincial Congress as state troops but on November 28, 1775, it became part of the Continental Army per direction of the Continental Congress). In January 1776 the organization contained eight companies. Francis Nash was appointed colonel in April 1776. The regiment was present at the defense of Charleston in 1776. It transferred from the Southern Department to George Washington's main army in February 1777. At that time, Thomas Clark became colonel of the 1st Regiment. The regiment became part of General Francis Nash's North Carolina Brigade in July.

== Commanders ==
The commanders were full colonels and included:

- Col. James Moore: He was commissioned as colonel/commandant on August 21, 1775, and served until April 10, 1776, when he was commissioned as Brigadier General of the 1st Brigade of the North Carolina line. This brigade included the 4th, 5th and 6th Regiments.
- Col. Francis Nash: He was commissioned as colonel/commandant on April 10, 1776. He served until February 5, 1777, when he was promoted to Brigadier General of the 3rd North Carolina Brigade commanded by General James Moore until his death.
- Col. Thomas Clark: The Continental Congress promoted him to colonel/commandant of the 1st North Carolina Regiment on February 5, 1777, upon General Nash's promotion. He was promoted to brigadier general of the North Carolina Brigade on May 15, 1778. In early 1780, he was again given command of the 1st North Carolina Regiment. He was captured at the siege of Charleston on May 12, 1780, and was not released until November 26, 1782. He retired on January 1, 1783.
- Lt. Col. William Lee Davidson: He served as the colonel/commandant of the 1st North Carolina Regiment from January 9, 1779, until 1780.

Known lieutenant colonels included

- Lt. Col. Francis Nash
- Lt. Col. Thomas Clark
- Lt. Col. William Davis
- Lt. Col. Robert Mebane
- Lt. Col. John Baptista Ashe
- Lt. William Lee Davidson

Known majors included

- Maj. Thomas Clark
- Maj. William Davis
- Maj. Caleb Granger
- Maj. John Walker
- Maj. John Baptiste Ashe
- Maj. John Nelson

== Engagements ==
In 1777 the 1st North Carolina saw action at the battles of Brandywine and Germantown and it was present at White Marsh. Still led by Clark, it fought at Monmouth in June 1778. The North Carolina Brigade marched south under the command of James Hogun and arrived at Charlestown, South Carolina in March 1780. The 1st Regiment was captured by the British army at the Siege of Charleston on May 12, 1780. Clark and 287 men became prisoners. The regiment was reformed in the summer of 1781 and fought well in Jethro Sumner's brigade at Eutaw Springs in September that year. The 1st North Carolina was furloughed on April 23, 1783, at James Island, South Carolina and disbanded on November 15, 1783.

The complete list of engagements (battles and skirmishes) of the regiment include the following:

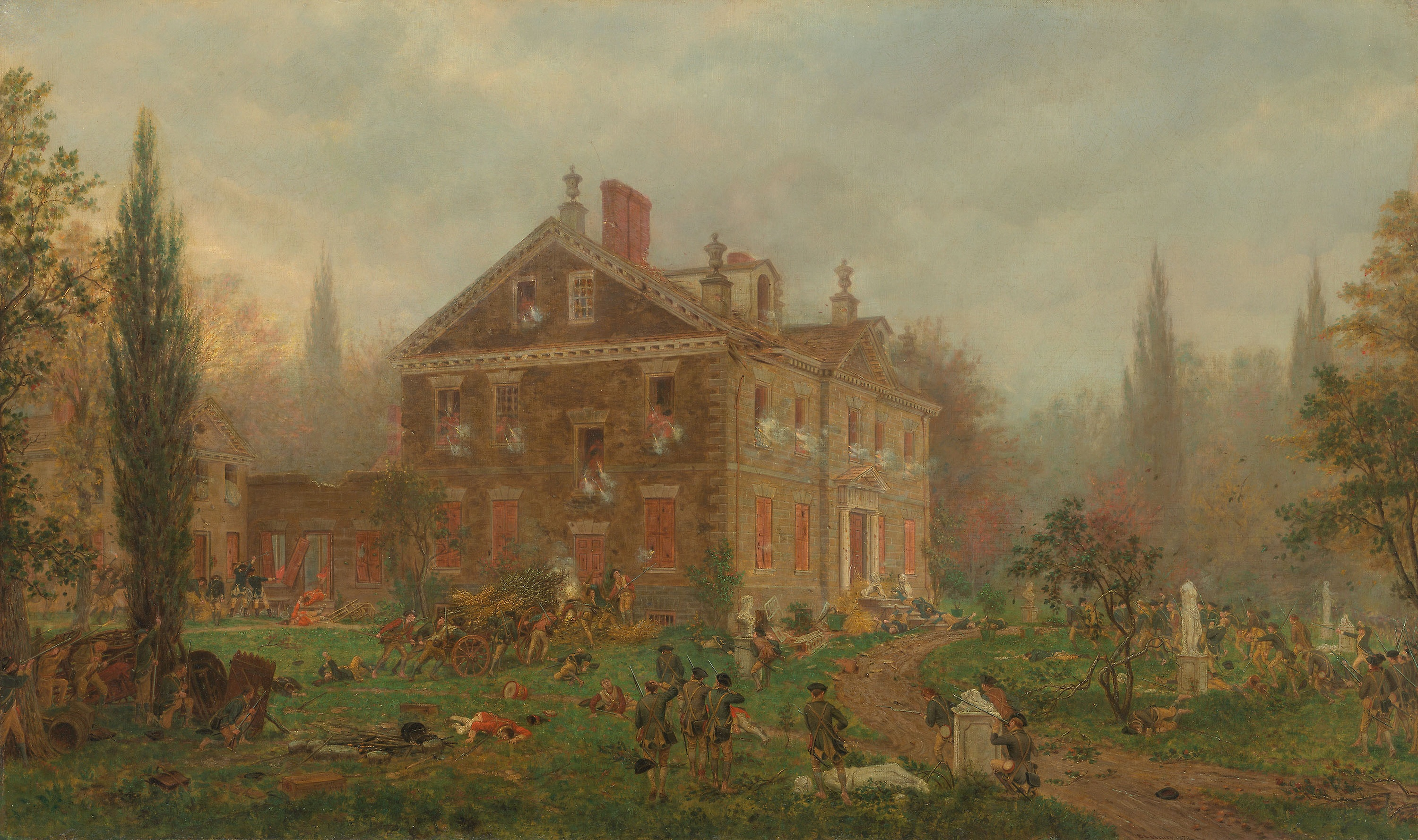
Battle of Germantown where General Nash was mortally wounded

- December 22, 1775, Battle of Great Cane Brake in South Carolina
- December 23–30, 1775, Snow Campaign in South Carolina
- February 27, 1776, Battle of Moore's Creek Bridge in North Carolina
- March 8–12, 1776, Fort Johnston #4 in North Carolina
- April 6, 1776, Brunswick Town #1 in North Carolina
- May 1–3, 1776, Fort Johnston #5 in North Carolina
- May 11, 1776, Orton Mill & Kendal Plantation in North Carolina
- June 28, 1776, Battle of Sullivan's Island/Fort Moultrie #1 in South Carolina
- June 28, 1776, Breach Inlet Naval Battle in South Carolina
- September 1776, Florida Expedition
- September 11, 1777, Battle of Brandywine Creek in Pennsylvania
- October 4, 1777, Battle of Germantown in Pennsylvania
- June 28, 1778, Battle of Monmouth in New Jersey
- May 16, 1779, Near West Point in New York
- July 15, 1779, Stony Point in New York

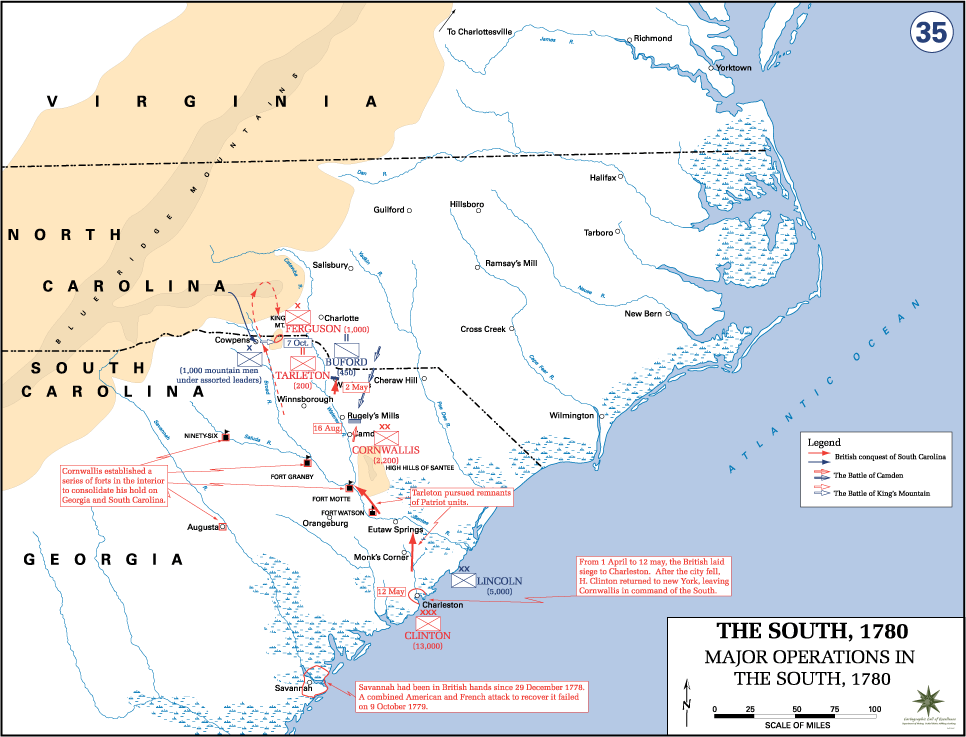
Major Battles in 1780

- April 14, 1780, Battle of Monck's Corner #1 in South Carolina
- May 6, 1780, Lenud's Ferry in South Carolina
- May 7, 1780, Fort Moultrie #2 in South Carolina
- March 28 to May 12, 1780, Siege of Charleston 1780 in South Carolina
- March 15, 1781, Battle of Guilford Court House in North Carolina
- April 25, 1781, Battle of Hobkirk's Hill in South Carolina
- May 12, 1781, Battle of Fort Motte in South Carolina
- May 21 to June 19, 1781, Siege of Ninety-Six 1781 in South Carolina
- May 24 to June 1, 1781, Siege of Augusta in Georgia
- September 8, 1781, Battle of Eutaw Springs in South Carolina
- September 12, 1781, Hillsborough in North Carolina

== Other Officers ==
Other officers included the surgeon, surgeon's mater, quartermaster, commissary, chaplain, muster master, deputy muster master, paymaster, and captains. The captains led a company that included a lieutenant, ensign, sergeant, corporal, fifers, drummers, and privates. The original captains of the 1st North Carolina Regiment included:

- William Davis
- Thomas Allon
- Alfred Moore
- Caleb Grainger
- William Picket
- Robert Rowan
- William Boswell
- John Walker
- Henry Dickson
- George Davidson
- William Green
- Lieutenants.
- John Lillington
- Joshua Bowman
- Lawrence Thompson
- Thomas Hogg
- William Berryhill
- Hector McNeill
- Absalom Tatum
- Hezekiah Rice
- William Brandon
- William Hill

Original Ensigns

- Neill McAlister
- Maurice Moore, Jr.
- John Taylor
- Howell Tatum
- James Childs
- Henry Neill
- Berryman Turner
- George Graham
- Robert Rolston
- Henry Pope
- James Holland
