= John Williams (Continental Congress) =

American Founding Father, politician and judge (1731–1799)

John Williams (March 14, 1731 – October 10, 1799), born in Surry County, North Carolina, was a Founding Father of the United States and signer of its Articles of Confederation. He was one of the founders of the University of North Carolina. During the American Revolutionary War, Williams was a colonel in the North Carolina militia. In 1777 and 1778, he was a member of the North Carolina House of Commons and served as speaker of the House. Williams was a member of the Continental Congress in 1778 and 1779.

Willams served as a superior court judge both during the colonial era and after the new state of North Carolina was established in 1776. Sitting alongside other superior court judges as part of a Court of Conference (forerunner to the North Carolina Supreme Court), Williams heard the landmark case, Bayard v. Singleton, which announced the principle of judicial review on the state level before Marbury v. Madison did so on the federal level.

== Family and political career ==
Williams was born on March 14, 1731, in Surry County, North Carolina, the son of John Williams Sr and Mary Keeling. He married Mary Womack. They had 6 children, John Williams III, William Williams and Mary (Williams) Farra, Charles, William, Nathaniel who married Elizabeth Keeling, half-sister to the mother of George Washington, and Agatha who married Col. Robert Burton of Granville County, North Carolina. Was also married to Agnes Bullock 12 Nov 1759 • Granville, North Carolina, USA

== Revolutionary War ==
Williams was commissioned on September 9, 1775, as a lieutenant colonel under Col. James Thackston in the Orange County Minutemen Regiment. Both men participated in the Battle of Moore's Creek Bridge on February 27, 1776. All minutemen regiments were disbanded on April 10, 1776. He was a colonel and commandant of the 9th North Carolina Regiment of the North Carolina Line from 1776 to 1778.

== Death and legacy ==
Williams died on October 10, 1799. The town of Williamsboro, North Carolina, for which he donated the land, is named for Williams. Williams was a first cousin and law partner of Judge Richard Henderson.
