= Thomas Blount (North Carolina politician) =

American politician

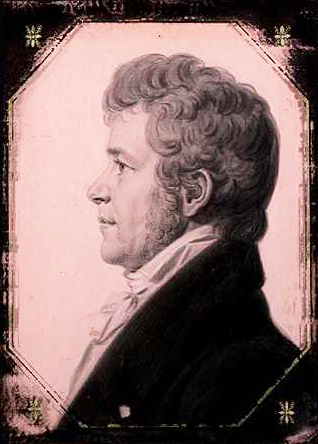

Member of the U.S. House of Representatives from North Carolina
- In office March 4, 1805 – March 4, 1809
- Preceded by: William Kennedy
- Succeeded by: William Kennedy
- Constituency: 3rd district
- In office March 4, 1811 – February 7, 1812
- Preceded by: William Kennedy
- Succeeded by: William Kennedy
- Constituency: 3rd district
- In office March 4, 1793 – March 4, 1799
- Preceded by: District established
- Succeeded by: Willis Alston
- Constituency: 9th district

Personal details
- Born: May 10, 1759 Craven County, Province of North Carolina, British America
- Died: February 7, 1812 (aged 52) Washington, D.C., U.S.
- Party: Democratic-Republican (since 1795)
- Other political affiliations: Anti-Administration (until 1795)
- Military career
- Burial place: Congressional Cemetery
- Allegiance: United States of America
- Branch: North Carolina Line
- Service years: 1777–1778
- Rank: Lieutenant, Adjutant General
- Units: 5th North Carolina Regiment, North Carolina militia

Thomas Blount (May 10, 1759 – February 7, 1812) was an American soldier, and politician. He served as a lieutenant in the North Carolina Line and as an adjutant general to Major General Richard Caswell in the North Carolina militia during the American Revolutionary War. After the war, he served as a representative in the North Carolina General Assembly and served three terms in U.S. representative from the 5th Congressional District in North Carolina.

== Early life ==
He was born at Blount Hall on May 10, 1759, in Craven County (in the portion of it which became Pitt County in 1760) in the Province of North Carolina. His parents were Jacob Blount of Beaufort County, North Carolina and Barbara Gray Blount. Jacob Blount acquired an estate of six thousand acres on Contentnea Creek between 1757 and 1783. Thomas had six siblings: William (b. 26 March 1749), Ann (b. 3 October 1750), John Gray (b. 21 September 1752), Louisa (b. 17 January 1755), Reading (b. 22 February 1757), and Jacob (b. 5 November 1760). Thomas's mother died in 1763 and his father remarried to Hannah Salter Baker. Thomas was educated at home. He was close to his brothers William and John Gray in both business and politics. Together, they ran the Blount Brothers mercantile business, which was one of the largest in North Carolina and based in Washington, North Carolina. John Gray and William were representatives in the North Carolina General Assembly.

== Career ==
=== Military service ===
In 1777 at the age of 16, Blount entered the Continental Army's 5th North Carolina Regiment during the American Revolutionary War. He served as a lieutenant under Captain Benjamin Stedman. He was dropped from the rolls in January 1778, since he was captured during the conflicts (most likely the Battle of Germantown). He was among those prisoners of war shipped to England for detention. In 1780, he was back in North Carolina and served as Adjutant General to Major General Richard Caswell in the North Carolina militia.

=== Political career ===
He served as the representative for North Carolina's 9th congressional district in the United States House of Representatives from 1793 to 1799, and the 3rd congressional district from 1805 to 1809 and 1811 to his death in 1812. He was also a U.S. Senate candidate in 1792, and an unsuccessful congressional candidate in 1802.

He died in office on February 7, 1812 in Washington, D.C., and was interred at the Congressional Cemetery.

== Personal life ==
He was the brother of William Blount and John Gray Blount and the uncle of William Grainger Blount. His wife, Mary J. Sumner, was the daughter of Jethro Sumner.

His home at Tarboro, The Grove, was listed on the National Register of Historic Places in 1971.

== See also ==
- List of members of the United States Congress who died in office (1790–1899)
