= James Murray (loyalist) =

British loyalist

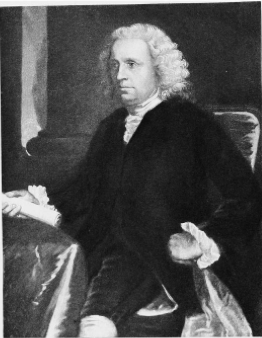
James Murray by John Singleton Copley

James Murray (August 9, 1713 – November 8, 1781) was a British loyalist who lived in North Carolina and Boston prior to the American Revolution, eventually escaping from Boston to settle in Halifax, Nova Scotia. He was one of the few loyalists who lived in both the South and the North prior to the Revolution, making the letters he wrote particularly valuable.

== Early life ==
Murray was born on August 9, 1713, in Unthank in Scotland. He was son of John Murray and Anne (née Bennet) Murray, who married in April 1712. Among his siblings was John Murray (1721-1781) of Norwich and Elizabeth Murray (1726-1785), later Campbell, Smith, and Inman. Both John and Elizabeth were painted by John Singleton Copley. Another sister, Barbara Murray, was married to Thomas Clark, a merchant, and was the mother of Thomas Clark (a Continental Army officer) and Ann Clark (the wife of William Hooper, a signer of the Declaration of Independence).

His paternal grandfather was John Murray of Bowhill.

== Life in America ==
In 1735, Murray emigrated from Scotland to the Province of North Carolina. When in North Carolina, he became a member of the North Carolina General Assembly and president of the Governor's Council. He established the Point Repose Plantation at Wilmington, North Carolina. Four of his six children with his first wife died on the plantation.

After being thwarted in his efforts to become governor, Murray moved to Boston in 1765 and established various businesses. Prior to moving, however, Murray sent his oldest daughter Dorothy (who was also painted by Copley) to Boston to live with his sister Elizabeth.

He turned the operation of the plantation over to his nephew, Thomas Clark, who became a Brigadier general in the Continental Army.

In 1778, Murray, who remained loyal to the British Crown, evacuated Boston and moved north to Halifax, Nova Scotia.

== Personal life ==
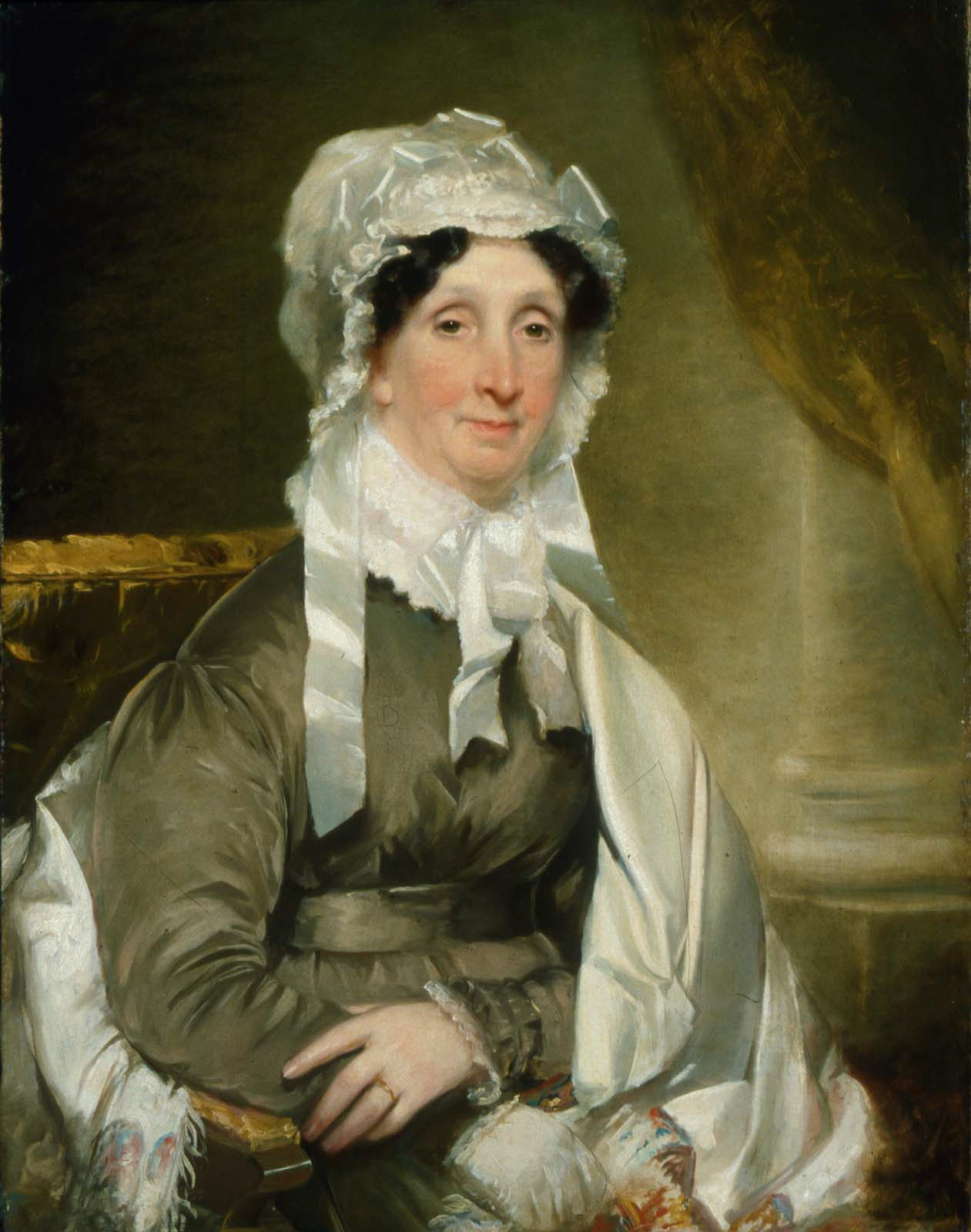
Portrait of his daughter, Elizabeth, by Chester Harding, 1827.

In 1761, he married Barbara Bennet (1724–1760). Barbara was the daughter of Andrew Bennet and Dorothy (née Collingwood) Bennet. Her mother was the half-sister Cuthbert Collingwood (grandfather of Cuthbert Collingwood, 1st Baron Collingwood). Together, they were the parents of:

- Dorothy "Dolly" Murray (1745–1837), who married Rev. John Forbes (1740–1783) in 1769.
- Elizabeth Murray (1756–1837), who married Edward Hutchinson Robbins (1758–1837), the Lieutenant Governor of Massachusetts, in 1785.

Murray died in 1781 and was buried in the Old Burying Ground in Halifax.

=== Descendants ===
Through his eldest daughter Dorothy, he was the grandfather of diplomat John Murray Forbes.

== See also ==
- Nova Scotia in the American Revolution
