= John Armstrong (Carolina) =

- Born: 1735; Surry County, Province of North Carolina, British Empire
- Died: 1784 (aged 48–49)
- Occupation: soldier
- Relatives: Martin Armstrong (brother)

John Armstrong (1735 – c. 1784) was an American soldier and land speculator from Surry County, Province of North Carolina. During the American Revolutionary War he led units of the 2nd North Carolina Regiment of the Continental Line, advancing to the rank of lieutenant colonel. He was in command of the 2nd North Carolina regiment at the Battle of Eutaw Springs in September 1781.

After the war he became a land registrar for North Carolina and was active in converting war service patent rights into land grants. He originated the survey and plat layout that became the town of Clarksville, Tennessee.

He was the brother of Martin Armstrong, also an American Revolutionary War officer.
