= 5th North Carolina Regiment =

- Active: 1776-1781
- Allegiance: Continental Congress of the United States
- Branch: Continental Army
- Type: Infantry
- Part of: Southern/Northern Department, North Carolina Brigade
- Engagements: Battle of Brandywine, Battle of Germantown, Battle of Monmouth, Siege of Savannah, Siege of Charleston

Commanders
- Notable commanders: Col. Edward Buncombe, Col. Thomas Clark

The 5th North Carolina Regiment was assigned on March 26, 1776, to the Continental Army in the Southern Department. It was organized in the spring of 1776 at Wilmington, North Carolina, as eight companies of volunteers from the districts of New Bern, Edenton and Hillsborough District of North Carolina. On February 5, 1777, the regiment was assigned to the main Continental Army and assigned to the North Carolina Brigade on July 8, 1777. The regiment was reduced to a cadre on June 1, 1778, at Valley Forge, Pennsylvania and was assigned to the Southern Department. The regiment was re-organized to nine companies during the fall of 1778 at Halifax and assigned on January 11, 1779, to Sumner's Brigade. On 3 June 1779, this brigade was redesignated as Armstrong's Brigade. The regiment was captured by the British Army on 12 May 1780 at Charlestown, South Carolina and was officially disbanded on January 1, 1781.

== History ==
The 5th North Carolina Regiment was organized in March 1776 as part of the Southern Department, where it remained till February 5, 1777. The companies from the regiment were first organized in Wilmington, North Carolina and included men from New Bern, Edenton, and other parts of the Hillsborough District. Soldiers served for tours of nine months at a time. Later that year on July 8, 1777, the regiment was assigned to the Northern Department of the Continental Army.

The 5th North Carolina Regiment was folded into the 3rd North Carolina Regiment, commanded by Col Jethro Sumner sometime after May 29, 1778. The soldiers that remained with the army remained with the 3rd until January 1779 when the 5th North Carolina Regiment was reestablished under the Southern Command with Col Thomas Clark as commander. The command did not last longer than early 1780. It was officially disbanded on January 1, 1781. Most of the remaining men were absorbed into the 3rd North Carolina Regiment.

== Officers ==
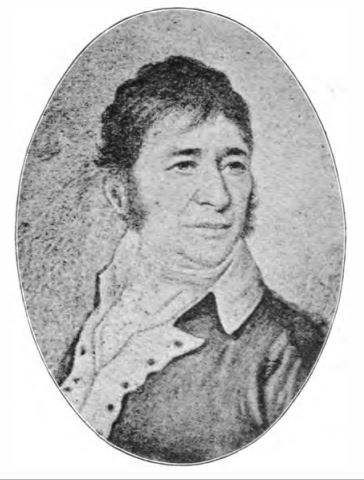
Reading Blount, 1756/58–1807

Known Field grade officers:

- Col. Edward Buncombe (April 15 – May 1778)
- Col. Thomas Clark (1779)
- Lt. Col. Henry Irwin
- Lt. Col. William Lee Davidson
- Lt. Col. Henry "Hal" Dixon
- Maj. Levi Dawson
- Maj. Thomas Hogg
- Maj. Reading Blount (brother of Thomas Blount)

The brother of Major Reading Blount, Lieutenant Thomas Blount, served with this unit until he was captured and taken to prison in England.

== Known engagements ==
The 5th North Carolina Regiment served with the North Department in 1777 and with the Southern Department in 1779:

- September 11, 1777, Battle of Brandywine Creek in Pennsylvania
- October 4, 1777, Battle of Germantown in Pennsylvania
- March 3, 1779, Battle of Brier Creek in Georgia
- June 20, 1779, Battle of Stono Ferry in South Carolina
- September 16, to October 18, 1779, Siege of Savannah in Georgia (one unit)
