= Eutaw Springs Battleground Park =

- U.S. National Register of Historic Places
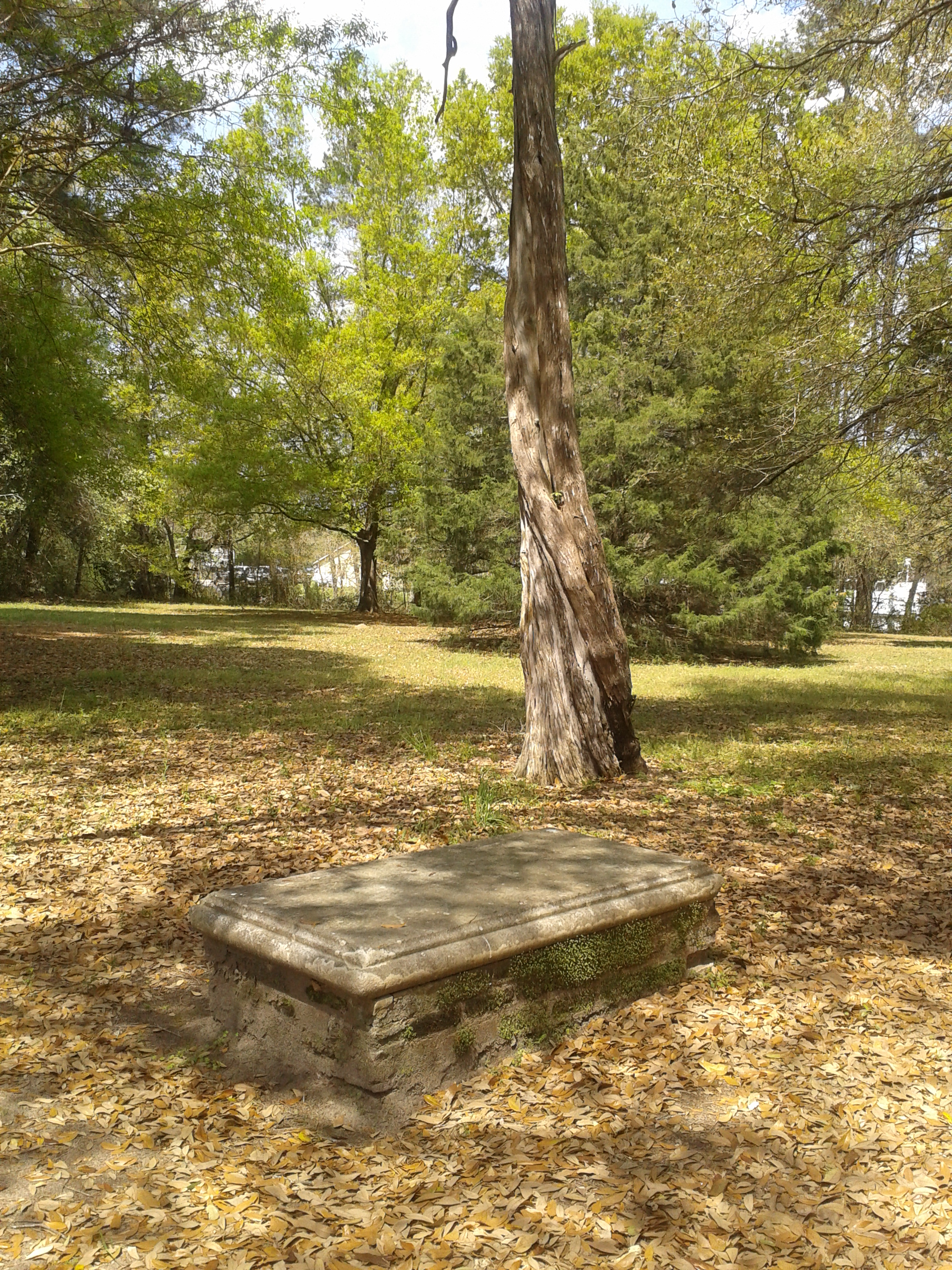
- Grave of John Marjoribanks at Eutaw Springs Battleground Park; it was moved to the site in 1948 when its original location was flooded by the creation of Lake Marion

- Location within South Carolina Location within the United States
- Location: 2 mi. E of Eutawville on SC 6 and 45, near Eutawville, South Carolina
- Coordinates: 33°24′30″N 80°17′57″W
- Area: 2.7 acres (1.1 ha)
- Built: 1781
- NRHP reference No.: 70000593
- Added to NRHP: June 5, 1970

Eutaw Springs Battleground Park is a historic site located near Eutawville, Orangeburg County, South Carolina. It was the site of the American Revolutionary War Battle of Eutaw Springs. The battle occurred on September 8, 1781, and was the last major engagement of the war in the Carolinas. The site includes a historic marker and the tomb of British Commander Major John Marjoribanks.

It was added to the National Register of Historic Places in 1970. The American Battlefield Trust and its partners have acquired and preserved more than 18 acres of battlefield land outside the park as of mid-2023.
