= Jethro Sumner =

Continental Army officer

- Born: Jethro Exum Sumner c. 1733; Nansemond County, Virginia, British America
- Died: c. March 18, 1785 (aged 51–52); Warren County, North Carolina, U.S.
- Burial place: Guilford Courthouse National Military Park; 36°07′56.0″N 79°50′33.1″W
- Military career
- Allegiance: Kingdom of Great Britain; United States
- Branch: North Carolina Provincial Troops; Continental Army; North Carolina Militia
- Service years: 1758–1783
- Rank: Brigadier General
- Commands: Fort Bedford (1760); 3rd North Carolina Regiment (1776–1778)
- Conflicts: French and Indian War; Battle of Fort Duquesne; American Revolutionary War; Battle of Sullivan's Island; Battle of Brandywine; Battle of Germantown; Battle of Stono Ferry; Battle of Eutaw Springs

Jethro Exum Sumner (c. 1733 – c. March 18, 1785) was a senior officer of the Continental Army during the American Revolutionary War. Born in Virginia, Sumner's military service began in the French and Indian War as a member of the state's Provincial forces. After the conclusion of that conflict, he moved to Bute County, North Carolina, where he acquired a substantial area of land and operated a tavern. He served as Sheriff of Bute County, but with the coming of the American Revolution, he became a strident patriot, and was elected to North Carolina's Provincial Congress.

Sumner was named the commanding officer of the 3rd North Carolina Regiment of the North Carolina Line, a formation of the Continental Army, in 1776, and served in both the Southern theater and Philadelphia campaign. He was one of five brigadier generals from North Carolina in the Continental Army, in which capacity he served between 1779 and 1783. He served with distinction in the battles of Stono Ferry and Eutaw Springs, but recurring bouts of poor health often forced him to play an administrative role, or to convalesce in North Carolina. Following a drastic reduction in the number of North Carolinians serving with the Continental Army, Sumner became a general in the state's militia but resigned in protest after the North Carolina Board of War awarded overall command of the militia to William Smallwood, a Continental Army general from Maryland. At the end of the war in 1783, Sumner helped to establish the North Carolina Chapter of the Society of the Cincinnati, and became its first president. He died in 1785 with extensive landholdings and 35 slaves.

== Early life ==
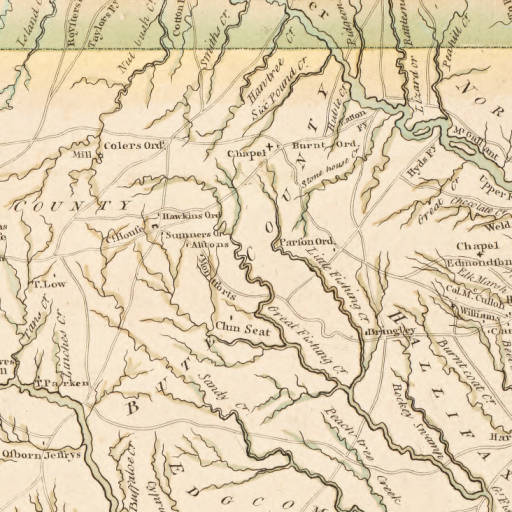
A portion of John Collet's 1770 map of North Carolina depicting the environs of Bute County

Sumner was born in Nansemond County, Virginia, in 1733 to Jethro and Margaret Sullivan Sumner. His family had originally settled in Nansemond County in 1691.

Between 1758 and 1761, during the French and Indian War, he was a lieutenant in the Virginia Provincial forces in Pennsylvania under the command of William Byrd III. On November 25, 1758, Sumner participated in the capture of Fort Duquesne. He was made commander at Pennsylvania's Fort Bedford in 1760.

After his regiment was disbanded in 1761, he returned home to Nansemond County. Between 1761 and 1764, he moved to Bute County in North Carolina, and married Mary Hurst of Granville County, with whom he had three children. One daughter, Mary, went on to wed Thomas Blount, who later served multiple terms in the United States House of Representatives.

Sumner owned substantial property inherited through his wife's family in Bute County, where he also owned and possibly operated a tavern on land that he leased for £36 annually. Like many former Virginians who moved across the border into North Carolina during the colonial era, it is likely that Sumner would have retained close business ties with the province of his birth.

Between 1772 and 1776, he served as sheriff of Bute County, resigning when he became an officer during the American Revolutionary War. Sumner was active in pre-Revolution protests and politics, as he believed a separation from Great Britain was inevitable.

== American Revolutionary War ==
In 1775, the North Carolina Provincial Congress passed legislation to raise militia forces throughout the state, and to that end it organized six militia districts, including one, centered on the town of Halifax, which contained Sumner's home.

The soldiers comprising the militia throughout the state were to enlist for six-month periods. Sumner was chosen to be a major in the Halifax District militia, and was instructed to drill his men so that they would be prepared for the expected conflict. Between August and September 1775, he served as Bute County's representative at the Third North Provincial Congress. In November 1775, Sumner summoned his militia into active service, and marched north to join Robert Howe in capturing (and later burning) Norfolk, Virginia.

=== Southern theater, 1776 ===
On April 4, 1776, after the American Revolutionary war had been raging in Massachusetts for nearly a year, the Provincial Congress at Halifax chose Sumner to be colonel, and thus commanding officer, of the 3rd North Carolina Regiment. He likely participated in the defense of Charleston against a British invasion attempt in 1776, after which he was involved in the aborted plans of Major General Charles Lee to invade British Florida. During the planning stages for the Florida invasion, Sumner disagreed with Peter Muhlenberg of the 8th Virginia Regiment over which of the two was to be given command over Lee's Virginia and North Carolina troops while the commanding general was traveling in advance of his men. This dispute was resolved only when a military court of inquiry awarded Muhlenberg temporary command after Sumner failed to appear and plead his case. By August 18, 1776, Sumner's 3rd Regiment had reached Savannah, Georgia, where they joined Lee, who had arrived earlier in the month. The planned invasion of Florida did not materialize, though, and Sumner left his regiment at Savannah in September 1776 to recruit more soldiers from North Carolina.

=== Philadelphia campaign and Valley Forge ===
In early 1777, Sumner resumed command of the 3rd North Carolina regiment, and marched the unit north to serve under George Washington in the Philadelphia campaign. In early and mid-1777, he remained encamped with the main portion of the Continental Army at Morristown, New Jersey. He and his men drilled regularly and had their supplies and arms inspected and repaired, although many of the North Carolinians had such poor muskets that a substantial number were discarded. Sumner and his regiment fought in the battles of Brandywine and Germantown, and spent the winter of 1777 to 1778 in Valley Forge with Washington's army.

After the death at Germantown of General Francis Nash, the regiments of his North Carolina brigade were left without a commanding general. Generals Alexander McDougall of New York and Lachlan McIntosh of Georgia were appointed in succession to temporary command of the North Carolinians while in winter quarters. Many North Carolina officers believed the state was due the appointment of two additional brigadier generals based on the number of soldiers it provided to the Continental Army. At Valley Forge, the North Carolina brigade had a total strength of 1,051, but 353 were ill, and 164 lacked sufficient clothes to be fit for service. Sumner himself became ill in early 1778, and was forced to return home to recuperate; he continued to recruit soldiers in North Carolina during his recovery. Despite his recruitment efforts, in February 1778, North Carolina's regiments were consolidated because of a lack of available soldiers, and Sumner's 3rd Regiment absorbed the 5th North Carolina Regiment.

=== Promotion and campaigning in the Carolinas ===
Although North Carolina believed it was owed additional general officer positions, conflicts between members of the North Carolina General Assembly over who was to be considered for the positions stalled the appointment of officers to assume those positions. Thomas Burke, one of North Carolina's leading delegates to the Continental Congress, apparently lacked interest in any of the suggested candidates. To complicate matters further, Alexander Martin, once a leading candidate for generalship, resigned after charges of cowardice were leveled against him, and was no longer seen as an appropriate candidate. The General Assembly deferred discussion of possible replacement generals for more than a month after convening on November 7, 1777. By December 15, the North Carolina General Assembly instructed its representatives in the Second Continental Congress to nominate Sumner for promotion to general. It was not until January 9, 1779, though, that the Continental Congress commissioned Sumner as brigadier general (along with fellow North Carolinian James Hogun), and ordered him to join General Benjamin Lincoln in South Carolina. Sumner received the highest number of congressional votes, thirteen to Hogun's nine and Thomas Clark's four.

On June 20, 1779, Sumner led a Continental Army brigade at the Battle of Stono Ferry, assaulting the British right flank and routing the Hessian von Trümbach Regiment. The Continentals and the Patriot militia began to run out of ammunition during the battle, and Lincoln was forced to order a general retreat. At least seven Continental officers under Sumner's command were wounded, and future United States President Andrew Jackson's brother Hugh was among ten North Carolinians killed. After the engagement at Stono Ferry, Sumner experienced another bout of poor health. He returned to North Carolina to recover, continuing to recruit troops during his convalescence. He suffered financially during his recovery, as a monetary crisis at the time left many officers in his position barely able to support themselves at home. He was also tasked by Lincoln with finding deserters in North Carolina and pressing them back into service. Sumner was on a leave of absence in September and October 1779, during the Patriot defeat at the siege of Savannah.

=== Militia command ===
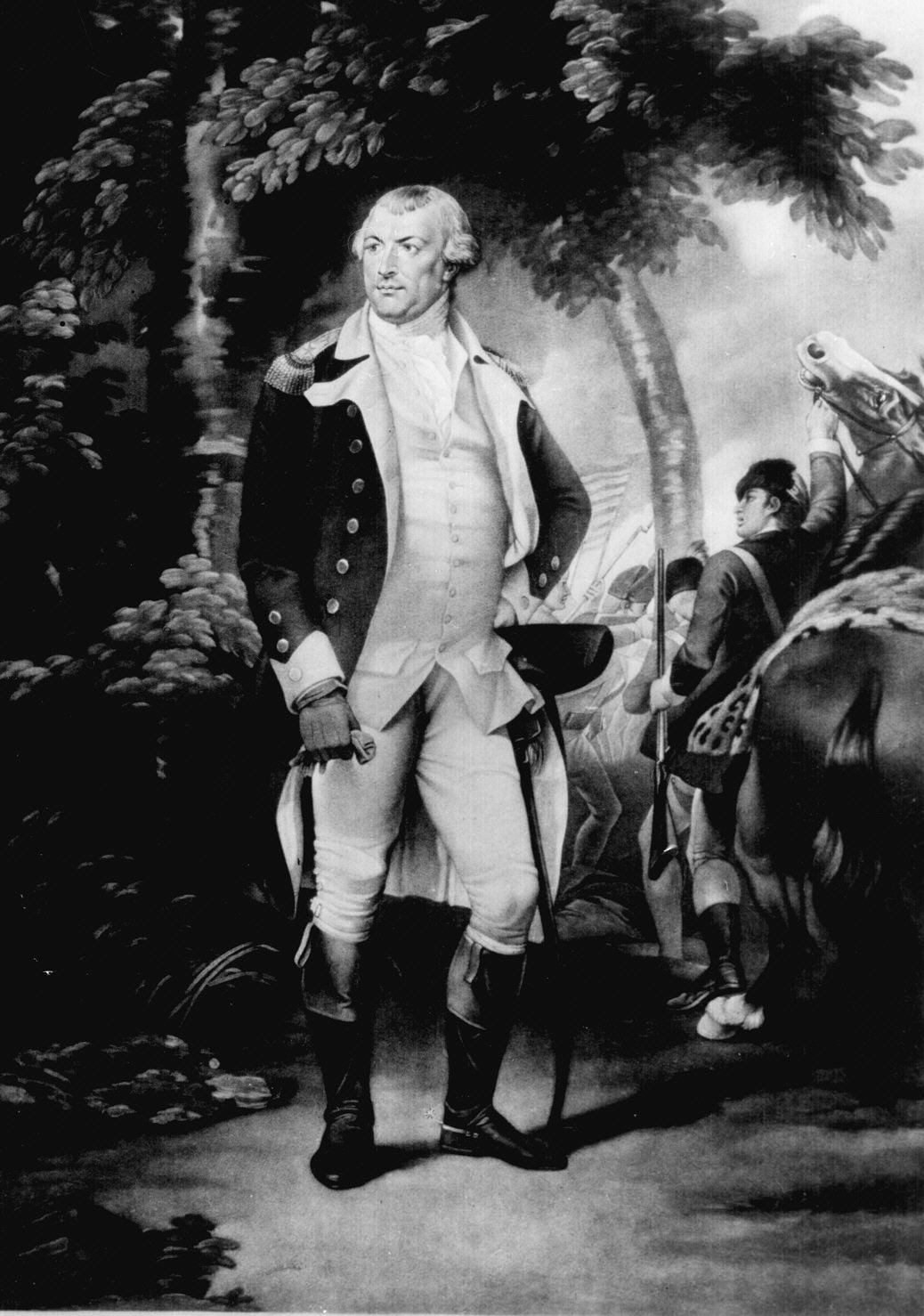
General Nathanael Greene, under whom Sumner served beginning in 1780

Between the siege of Charleston in May 1780 and the Battle of Camden in August that year, the North Carolina Line (a loose organizational structure that encompassed all of North Carolina's Continental Army units) was virtually annihilated, suffering substantial casualties and the loss of many men as prisoners of war. During at least part of the intervening time, Sumner was in North Carolina on a recruiting mission. Rather than rebuild the Line, the North Carolina General Assembly determined to rely on militia for the defense of the state. In September 1780, Sumner temporarily transferred to command of the Hillsborough District Brigade, under the statewide leadership of Richard Caswell. As commander of a brigade of North Carolina militia, Sumner was tasked with defending the state from the advances of British General Charles Cornwallis, but the militiamen were poorly equipped and ill-trained.

In late 1780, the North Carolina Board of War removed Caswell from command of North Carolina's militia, and the General Assembly awarded command of the militia to Continental Army Brigadier General William Smallwood of Maryland, citing the Assembly's lack of confidence in their own state's military commanders. Sumner was further offended when command of the dwindling number of North Carolina Continentals in the southern theater was given to Smallwood as well. Despite persistent urging from Alexander Martin and others, Sumner resigned from his militia command in October 1780, and returned to the Continental service. A political backlash by prominent militia commanders like Caswell and Martin and their supporters led to the abolition of the Board of War by the General Assembly soon after Sumner's resignation, and Caswell in particular came back to power on the Board's replacement organ, called the "Council Extraordinary".

=== Return to the Continental Army ===
Sumner next served under General Nathanael Greene, who arrived in the southern theater in December 1780 and directed Sumner to recruit further Continental soldiers from North Carolina. On June 2, 1781, Greene ordered Sumner to join him in South Carolina, which he did along with 350 new recruits on August 1. Despite the passage of a draft law in North Carolina, the number of men under his command fluctuated from day to day because of both temporary and permanent desertions. These desertions eventually elicited his personal apology to Greene, as Sumner felt unable to control the ebb of soldiers in camp. On September 8, his regiments were positioned on the right flank of the Continental Army at the Battle of Eutaw Springs, where his units served a vital role in halting several British assaults. Greene commented on the North Carolinians' actions at Eutaw Springs, stating that they "fought with a degree of obstinacy that would do honor to the best of veterans".

Following his success at Eutaw Springs, Sumner was made commanding officer of Continental Army forces in North Carolina by Greene in 1781. Greene primarily wanted him to regain control of the military situation in the state, as then-Governor and former Continental Congress delegate Thomas Burke had been captured by David Fanning in a stunning daylight raid on Hillsborough, North Carolina on September 12, 1781. Combat between the British and Continental armies effectively ceased in late 1781. After that point, Sumner failed to make any reports to Greene, who remained his commanding officer, for several months at a time, partly because of Sumner's recurring bouts of illness.

== Later life and legacy ==
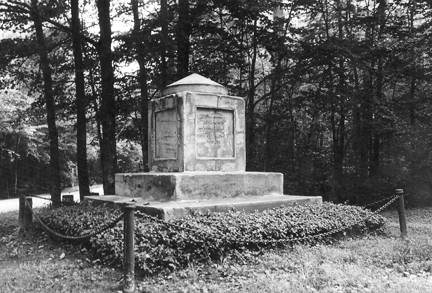
The Jethro Sumner Monument at Guilford Courthouse National Military Park, where Sumner was re-interred in 1891

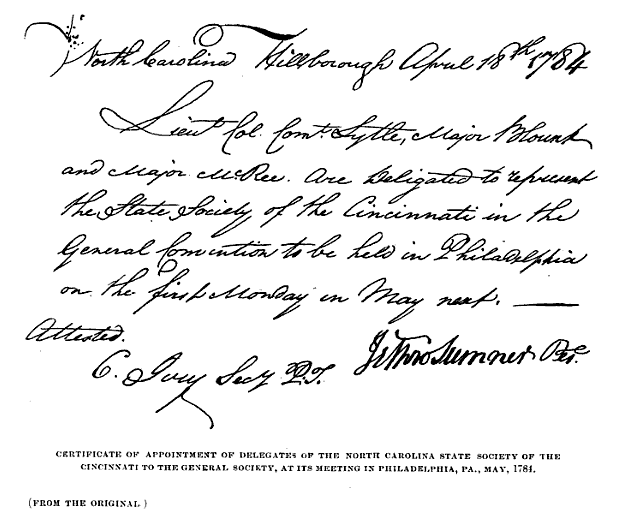
A letter signed by Sumner appointing delegates from the North Carolina Society of the Cincinnati to a National Meeting in May 1784

Following the war's end in 1783, Sumner returned to Bute County, which had been renamed Warren County after Joseph Warren, the hero of the Battle of Bunker Hill. It appears that Sumner's wife died at some point between 1781 and 1785. For his service in the Continental Army, he received a land warrant on October 23, 1783, which represented compensation for 84 months of service. Sumner helped create North Carolina's chapter of the Society of the Cincinnati in October 1783, and served as its first president.

Sumner died in Warren County between March 15 and March 19, 1785, at the age of 52. At his death, he owned 20,000 acres (8,000 ha) of land in North Carolina and Tennessee (much of which in the latter was part of the Continental Army land warrant he received), as well as 35 slaves. He was originally buried eight miles (13 km) outside of Warrenton, but in 1891 his remains were moved to the Guilford Courthouse Battlefield, where they were interred under a monument intended as part of a "shrine to patriots". In March 2012, a driver struck Sumner's monument after going off-road to avoid hitting a deer, nearly destroying the stone structure. The monument was restored by May 2012, and Sumner was reburied in a public ceremony. Sumner County, Tennessee, originally in the western portion of North Carolina, was named for him, although Sumner never visited the county.
