= North Carolina Line =

Colonial North Carolina militia units within the Continental Army

The North Carolina Line refers to North Carolina units within the Continental Army. The term "North Carolina Line" referred to the quota of infantry regiments assigned to North Carolina at various times by the Continental Congress. These, together with similar contingents from the other twelve states, formed the Continental Line. The concept was particularly important in relation to the promotion of commissioned officers. Officers of the Continental Army below the rank of brigadier general were ordinarily ineligible for promotion except in the line of their own state.

== History ==
- On June 26, 1775, less than ten weeks after the Battles of Lexington and Concord, the Continental Congress voted to support 1,000 Continental troops in North Carolina. This force was organized in September of that year as two regiments of 500 men each. Not all Continental infantry regiments raised in a state were part of a state quota, however. On December 27, 1776, the Continental Congress gave Washington temporary control over certain military decisions that the Congress ordinarily regarded as its own prerogative. These "dictatorial powers" included the authority to raise sixteen additional Continental infantry regiments at large.
- On November 28, 1775 the Continental Congress ordered both North Carolina and South Carolina to provide sufficient numbers of men to help the Continental Army, to be paid by the Continental Congress and not the states. Both states rose to the occasion and North Carolina provided the regiments identified above over a period of two years. These regiments fought in both theaters of the American Revolution, the Northern Department and the Southern Department.
- On March 7, 1777, the Continental Congress approved placing three companies of North Carolina Light Dragoons onto the Continental Line, not to be assigned to any existing regiment. On July 10, 1777, the Continental Congress approved placing the two companies of NC Artillery onto the Continental Line.
- On June 17, 1777, the Continental Congress accepted the offer of North Carolina to furnish another regiment for the Continental Army. This regiment, under the command of Colonel Abraham Sheppard, was unofficially designated the "10th North Carolina Regiment."

== Regiments ==
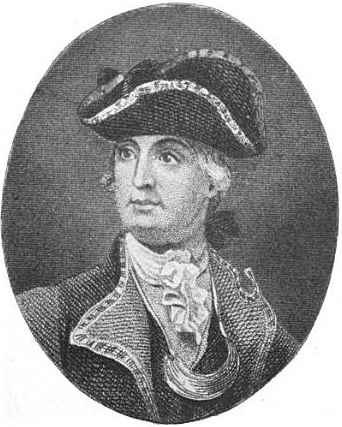
Maj General Robert Howe

The North Carolina Continental units included the following (original commander and date established are indicated):

- 1st North Carolina Regiment, (Colonel James Moore) 1775
- 2nd North Carolina Regiment, (Colonel Robert Howe) 1775
- 3rd North Carolina Regiment, (Colonel Jethro Sumner) 1776
- 4th North Carolina Regiment, (Colonel Thomas Polk) 1776
- 5th North Carolina Regiment, (Colonel Edward Buncombe 1776
- 6th North Carolina Regiment, (Colonel John Alexander Lillington) 1776
- 7th North Carolina Regiment, (Colonel James Hogun) 1776
- 8th North Carolina Regiment, (Colonel James Armstrong) 1776
- 9th North Carolina Regiment, (Colonel John Williams) 1776
- 10th North Carolina Regiment, (Colonel Abraham Sheppard) 1777

The North Carolina Regiments were for a time organized into a 1st, 2nd and 3rd Battalions (sometimes referred to as Brigades) early in the war and then consolidated as a North Carolina Battalion before October 1777.

- The 1st Battalion consisted of the 4th, 5th, and 6th Regiments and was under Brigadier General James Moore on April 10, 1776. He reported to Major General John Armstrong of the Southern Department.
- The 1st Brigade was commanded by Brigadier General James Hogun on January 9, 1779 and consisted of the 1st, 2nd, and 3rd regiments, and two companies of North Carolina Artillery. It was headquartered in Philadelphia, Pennsylvania.
- The 1st Brigade was part of Major General Benjamin Lincoln's surrender of Patriot forces at Charleston on May 12, 1780. General James Hogun was taken prisoner and imprisoned with his troops at Haddrell's Point, South Carolina.
- The 2nd Brigade was commanded by Brigadier General James Moore in 1776.
- The 2nd Brigade was commanded by Brigadier Jethro Sumner on January 9, 1779
- The North Carolina Brigade was commanded by Brigadier General Francis Nash on October 4, 1777 in the Philadelphia Campaign at the Battle of Germantown, where he was mortally wounded. (Note: The term North Carolina Line may refer to this North Carolina Battalion.)
- The North Carolina Brigade was commanded by Brigadier General Jethro Sumner on September 8, 1781 at the Battle of Eutaw Springs

== Dragoons ==
The Corps of North Carolina Light Dragoons consisted of four companies: 1st Company (Captain Samuel Ashe, Jr.), 2nd Company (Captain Martin Phifer), 3rd Company (Captain Cosmo Medici); 1777; 4th Company (Captain John Brown), 1778.

== Artillery ==
On May 9, 1776, the North Carolina General Assembly authorized the creation of one company of artillery, the 1st North Carolina Company of artillery, headed by Captain John Vance. Captain Vance resigned in November 1777 and he was replaced by Captain John Kingsbury on November 16, 1777. A second company, the 2nd North Carolina Company of Artillery was authorized by the North Carolina General Assembly on January 7, 1777 and was headed by Captain Thomas Clark. The 2nd company was disbanded in June 1779. While both companies were originally part of the North Carolina State troops, both companies were place under the Continental Line on July 10, 1777.

== Quartermaster General ==
See also Quartermaster General of the United States Army

On May 7, 1776, the Deputy Quarter Master General's Department was created for the Southern Department and Colonel Nicholas Long, former commander of the Halifax District Minutemen, was selected to head the department. Camp Quankey, near the town of Halifax, North Carolina was established as a depot and it remained until the end of the war with Colonel Long as commander.

== Engagements ==
The regiments of the North Carolina Line are known to have been involved in 36 engagements from December 1775 to August 1782.

Order	Date	Known Battles / Skirmishes	State/Province	1st	2nd	3rd	4th	5th	6th	7th	8th	9th	10th
1	December 22, 1775	Battle of Great Cane Brake	SC	x	x								
2	December 23–30, 1775	Snow Campaign	SC	x	x		x						
3	January 1, 1776	Burning of Norfolk	VA		x								
4	February 27, 1776	Battle of Moore's Creek Bridge	NC	x	x								
5	March 8–12, 1776	Fort Johnston #4	NC	x									
6	April 6, 1776	Brunswick Town #1	NC	x	x								
7	May 1–3, 1776	Fort Johnston #5	NC	x									
8	May 11, 1776	Orton Mill & Kendal Plantation	NC	x									
9	June 28, 1776	Breach Inlet Naval Battle	SC	x									
10	June 28, 1776	Fort Moultrie #1	SC	x	x	x	x						
11	September 1, 1776	Florida Expedition	FL	x	x	x							
12	September 6, 1776	Fort George/Bald Head Island	NC				x						
13	September 11, 1777	Battle of Brandywine	PA	x	x	x	x	x	x	x	x	x	x
14	October 4, 1777	Battle of Germantown	PA	x	x	x	x	x	x	x	x	x	x
15	June 28, 1778	Battle of Monmouth	NJ	x	x	x							
16	March 3, 1779	Battle of Brier Creek	GA				x	x	x				
17	May 16, 1779	Near West Point (NY)	NY	x	x								
18	May 31, 1779	Fort Lafayette	NY		x								
19	June 20, 1779	Battle of Stono Ferry	SC					x	x				
20	July 15, 1779	Battle of Stony Point	NY	x	x								
21	September 16, 1779 – October 18, 1779	Siege of Savannah	GA				x	x					
22	December 9, 1779	Battle of Great Bridge	VA		x								
23	March 28 to May 12, 1780	Siege of Charleston 1780	SC	x	x	x							
24	April 14, 1780	Battle of Monck's Corner #1	SC	x									
25	May 6, 1780	Battle of Lenud's Ferry	SC	x									
26	May 7, 1780	Fort Moultrie #2	SC	x	x								
27	August 11, 1780	Little Lynches Creek (1 unit)	SC			x							
28	August 16, 1780	Battle of Camden	SC	x									
29	March 15, 1781	Battle of Guilford Court House	NC	x		x	x						
30	April 25, 1781	Battle of Hobkirk's Hill	SC	x		x							
31	May 12, 1781	Siege of Fort Motte	SC	x									
32	May 21 to June 19, 1781	Siege of Ninety-Six 1781	SC	x									
33	May 24 to June 1, 1781	Siege of Augusta	GA	x									
34	September 8, 1781	Battle of Eutaw Springs	SC	x	x	x	x						
35	September 12, 1781	Battle of Lindley's Mill (Hillsborough)	NC	x									
36	August 25, 1782	Battle of the Combahee River	SC		x								
