= 9th North Carolina Regiment =

- Active: 1776–1778
- Allegiance: (United States) Continental Congress
- Branch: North Carolina Line, Southern/Northern Department of the Continental Army
- Type: Infantry
- Part of: North Carolina Brigade
- Engagements: Battle of Brandywine (1777); Battle of Germantown (1777)

Commanders
- Notable commanders: Colonel John Williams

The 9th North Carolina Regiment was raised, on 16 September 1776, at Halifax, North Carolina for service with the Continental Army. The regiment saw action at the Battle of Brandywine and Battle of Germantown. The regiment was disbanded, on 1 June 1778, at Valley Forge, Pennsylvania.

== History ==
The 9th North Carolina Regiment was one of ten regiments provided by North Carolina to the Continental Army between September 1775 and November 1776. It was relatively short lived, having been authorized and established on November 28, 1776 and disbanded by the Continental Congress on June 1, 1778 due to the low number of troops. It was never reconstituted.

The Hillsborough and Salisbury Districts contributed the bulk of the soldiers in the regiment that assembled in Halifax, North Carolina in the Spring of 1777. Eight companies of the regiment marched north as part of the Northern Department of the Continental Army and were engaged at the battles of Brandywine Creek on September 11, 1777 and Germantown on October 4, 1777 (both in Pennsylvania). All ten regiments from North Carolina participated in both of these battles. The commandant of the regiment, John Williams, who commissioned as colonel of the regiment on November 26, 1776, returned home to North Carolina after the regiment was disbanded.

The subordination of the 9th North Carolina regiment changed several times during its brief existence:

- November 28, 1776, Southern Department under Brigadier General James Moore, 1st North Carolina Brigade
- February 5, 1777, Southern Department under Brigadier General JAME Moore, 3rd North Carolina Brigade under Brigadier General Francis Nash
- April 15, 1777, Southern Department under Major General Robert Howe, North Carolina Brigade under Brigadier General Francis Nash
- July 8, 1777, Northern Department under Major General Philip Schuyler, North Carolina Brigade under Brigadier General Francis Nash (under the command of Major General Gilbert du Motier, Marquis de Lafayette at the Battle of Brandwine Creek)
- October 7, 1777, Northern Department under Major General Horatio Gates, North Carolina Brigade under Maj. Gen. Alexander McDougall of New York
- December 20, 1777, Northern Department under Major General Horatio Gates, North Carolina Brigade (North Carolina Line) under Brigadier General Lachlan McIntosh of Georgia
- May 15, 1778, Northern Department under Major General John Stark, North Carolina Brigade (North Carolina Line)
- May 29, 1778, Continental Congress orders reorganization of the ten North Carolina regiments
- June 1, 1778, 9th North Carolina Regiment disbanded

== Officers ==
Field Officers:

- Colonel John Williams, commandant
- Lieutenant Colonel John Luttrell
- Lieutenant Colonel Peter Dauge
- Major William Polk

== See also ==
- North Carolina Line and Engagements for a list of battles and skirmishes of the North Carolina regiments of the Continental Army
- Departments of the Continental Army
- Philadelphia campaign
