= Battle of Great Cane Brake =

1775 battle

- Part of the American Revolutionary War
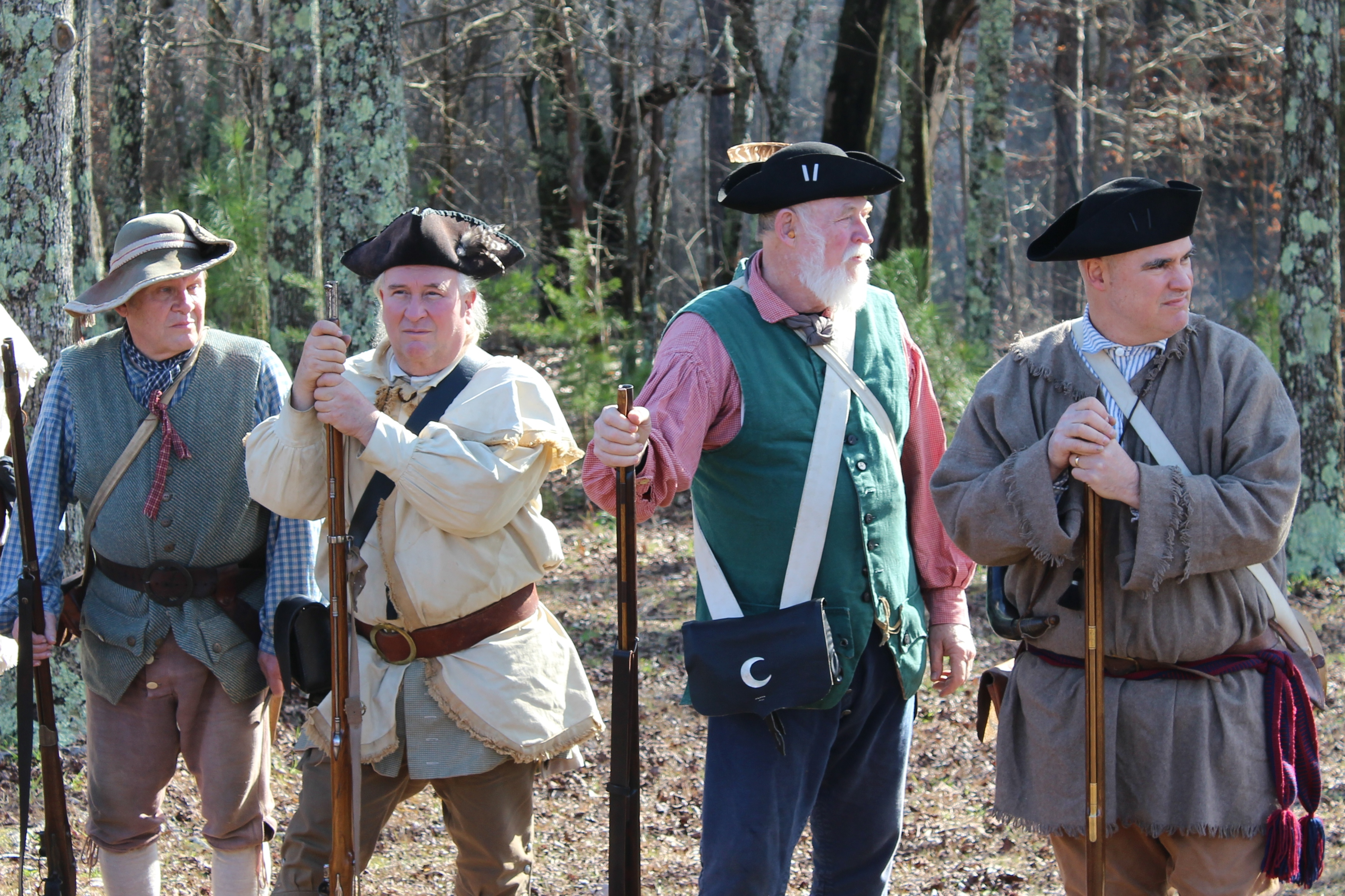
- American Revolution militia reenactors in upstate South Carolina (2016).
Date	December 22, 1775
Location	Greenville County, near Simpsonville, South Carolina 34°39′22.02″N 82°18′58.98″W
Result	Patriot victory

Belligerents
(Kingdom of Great Britain) British Loyalists	South Carolina militia

Commanders and leaders
Capt. Patrick Cunningham	Col. Richard Richardson; Maj. William "Danger" Thomson

Strength
500	1,300

Casualties and losses
6 killed wounded unknown 130 captured	1 wounded

The Battle of Great Cane Brake was a skirmish fought on December 22, 1775, during the American Revolutionary War in what was then Ninety-Six District, South Carolina, modern Greenville County.

== Background ==
With the coming of the American Revolution, the patriot government in Charles Town was opposed by a large concentration of "King's men" in the upcountry. Both sides recognized the need to cultivate the friendship of the Cherokees in a nearly lawless area of the state; and both sides promised to provide the Indians with ammunition for hunting.

In October 1775, the patriot Council of Safety in Charles Town sent 1,000 pounds of powder and 2,000 pounds of lead to the Indians, but a force of loyalists under the command of Patrick Cunningham intercepted the wagon train. Following an unsuccessful attempt to retake the munitions, the Charles Town leaders determined to break the strength of upcountry loyalism by raising an overwhelming force of militiamen under the command of Colonel Richard Richardson. Heavily outnumbered, the King's men fell back toward the Piedmont. By late December, Richardson had perhaps as many as 5,000 troops under his command and had captured the major loyalist leaders.

== Battle ==
On December 21, Richardson ordered 1,300 men under Major William "Danger" Thomson to pursue the loyalists into Indian territory. Thomson marched 25 miles through the night to a camp where loyalists had been sheltering from cold rain and snow flurries in a "Brake of Canes." Because the ground was wet and the loyalists had been burning cane stalks that popped and crackled, Thomson's men nearly managed to surround the camp before being discovered as they attacked at dawn. Cunningham escaped on an unsaddled horse and without his breeches, shouting for every man "to shift for himself." The patriots recaptured the munitions intended for the Cherokees, and they took 130 prisoners, forcing them to sign a document promising not to take up arms again. Only five or six loyalists were killed, though Thomson had to restrain his men from harming the prisoners, some of whom were sent off to Charles Town in chains.

== Aftermath ==
Despite the Patriot success, an unusual, heavy snowstorm occurred the following day, which caused considerable suffering among the militiamen, who had been called to duty on short notice with inadequate clothing and without tents. Some were permanently injured by exposure and frostbite. Thereafter the episode was known as the "Snow Campaign." Richardson believed that his victory had pacified the upcountry, but the Cherokees soon joined the loyalists in what became a brutal civil war on the South Carolina frontier.

== Commemoration ==
The exact location of the skirmish is unknown, although it took place near the Reedy River approximately 7 miles southwest of Simpsonville, South Carolina. There is a state historical marker on Fork Shoals Road south of Old Hundred Road (County Road 565).
