= 4th North Carolina Regiment =

- Active: 1776-1783
- Allegiance: Continental Congress of the United States
- Type: Infantry
- Part of: North Carolina Line

The 4th North Carolina Regiment was authorized on January 16, 1776 and established on April 15, 1776 at Wilmington, North Carolina for service with the Continental Army Southern Department under the command of Thomas Polk. The regiment saw action at the Battle of Brandywine, Battle of Germantown, Battle of Monmouth and the Siege of Charleston. The regiment was captured by the British Army at Charlestown, South Carolina, on May 12, 1780. The regiment was disbanded on January 1, 1783.

== Officers ==
Commanders:

- Col. Thomas Polk (1776-1778)
- Col. James Armstrong (1778-1781)
- Lt. Col. Henry "Hal" Dixon (1781-1782)
- Lt. Col. Archibald Lytle (1782-1783)

Known Lt. Colonels

- James Thackston
- Henry "Hal" Dixon
- Archibald Lytle
- John Armstrong
- Thornton Yancey

Known Majors:

- William Lee Davidson
- John Armstrong
- Thomas Harris
- Charles McLean
- Thomas Donoho
- George Dougherty
- Pinketham Eaton

Known regimental adjutants:

- William Covington
- Thomas Pasteur
- William Slade
- William Williams

== Engagements ==
Known engagements during the American Revolution include:

Start Year Month	Date range	Battles/Skirmishes	State
1776 6	6/28/1776	Fort Moultrie #1	SC
1776 9	9/6/1776	Fort George/Bald Head Island	NC
1777 9	9/11/1777	Battle of Brandywine Creek	PA
1777 10	10/4/1777	Battle of Germantown	PA
1779 3	3/3/1779	Battle of Briar Creek	GA
1779 6	6/20/1779	Battle of Stono Ferry	SC
1779 9	9/16-10/18/1779	Siege of Savannah	GA
1781 3	3/15/1781	Battle of Guilford Court House (one unit)	NC
1781 9	9/8/1781	Battle of Eutaw Springs	SC
