= Francis Nash =

American general

- Born: c. 1742; Prince Edward County, Virginia, British America
- Died: October 7, 1777 (aged 34–35) near Kulpsville, Pennsylvania, U.S.
- Burial place: Towamencin Mennonite Meetinghouse Cemetery, Towamencin Township, Pennsylvania; 40.24864°N 75.34710°W
- Military career
- Allegiance: Continental Congress; United States of America
- Branch: Continental Army
- Service years: 1771; 1775–1777
- Rank: Brigadier general
- Commands: 1st North Carolina Regiment (1775–1777); North Carolina brigade (1777)
- Conflicts: War of the Regulation; Battle of Alamance; American Revolutionary War; Battle of Sullivan's Island; Battle of Brandywine; Battle of Germantown †

Francis Nash (c. 1742 – October 7, 1777) was a brigadier general in the Continental Army during the American Revolutionary War. Prior to the war, he was a lawyer, public official, and politician in Hillsborough, North Carolina, and was heavily involved in opposing the Regulator movement, an uprising of settlers in the North Carolina piedmont between 1765 and 1771. Nash was also involved in North Carolina politics, representing Hillsborough on several occasions in the colonial North Carolina General Assembly.

Nash quickly became engaged in revolutionary activities, and served as a delegate to the first three Patriot provincial congresses. In 1775, he was named lieutenant colonel of the 1st North Carolina Regiment under Colonel James Moore, and served briefly in the southern theater of the Revolutionary War before being ordered north. Nash was made a brigadier general in 1777 upon Moore's death, and given command of the North Carolina brigade of the Continental Army under General George Washington. He led North Carolina's soldiers in the Philadelphia campaign, but was wounded at the Battle of Germantown on October 4, 1777, and died several days later. Nash was one of ten Patriot generals to die from wounds received in combat between 1775 and 1781. He is honored by several city and county names, including those of Nashville, Tennessee; Nashville, North Carolina; and Nash County, North Carolina.

== Early life and family ==
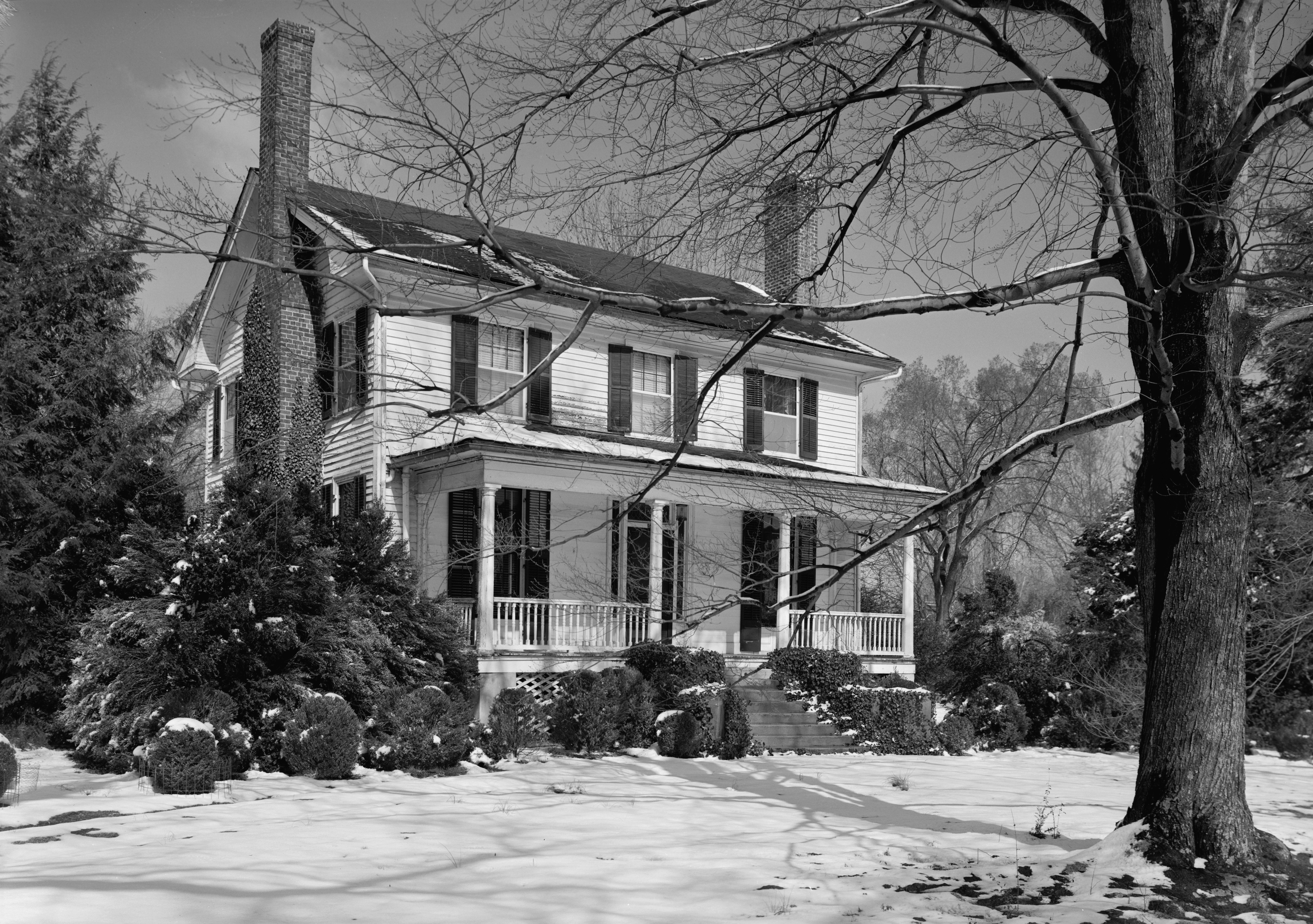
Francis Nash's home in Hillsborough, now known as the Nash-Hooper House

Nash was born around 1742 in Amelia County, Virginia (in an area that would later become Prince Edward County) to John and Ann Owen Nash. His parents were originally from Wales, and several of his seven siblings, including at least one brother, were born there. One of Nash's brothers was Abner Nash, who later became a statesman in North Carolina.

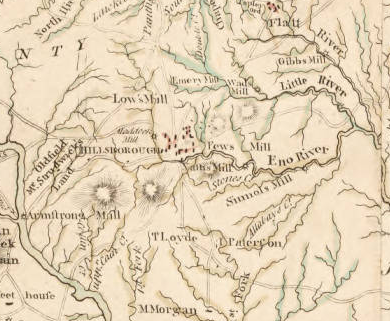
A portion of John Collet's 1770 map of North Carolina depicting the environs of Hillsborough and the Haw and Eno Rivers

By 1763, Francis Nash had moved along with Abner to Childsburgh, which later became Hillsborough. There Francis started a law practice, and became a clerk of court in 1763, a position which paid an annual stipend of £100 sterling. The Nash brothers also owned substantial property in the town, and established a mill on the Eno River, while Francis invested in a local store. From 1764 to 1765, he served his first term in the North Carolina Assembly representing Orange County.

In 1770, Nash married Sarah Moore, the daughter of colonial jurist Maurice Moore, niece of James Moore, and sister of future United States Supreme Court Justice Alfred Moore. Their union produced two daughters: Ann, who went under the guardianship of Peter Mallett and James Gardiner in 1785, and later married James Wallace, and Sarah, who went on to marry John Waddell, the son of North Carolina colonial soldier Hugh Waddell. Sarah was the grandmother to American Civil War Confederate blockade runner James Iredell Waddell. Francis Nash had two children out of wedlock, one of whom some scholars identify as a son also named Francis Nash, possibly born in 1770 or 1771. The mother of one of the children was reported as Hillsborough barmaid Ruth Jackson. Francis Nash the elder provided Jackson with property west of Hillsborough, and several slaves.

== War of the Regulation and pre-Revolution politics ==
Nash showed an interest in military affairs while living in Hillsborough, and received informal military training from a retired English soldier living there. He worked his way up through the Orange County militia ranks until he eventually became its commanding colonel. During the War of the Regulation, in 1768, he ordered the militia to put down several riots incited by the Regulators, but the militiamen were sympathetic towards the rioters and refused. Nash entered into a pact with others including Edmund Fanning, Adlai Osborne, and future governor Alexander Martin, to protect one another's property against Regulator threats, but the parties to that agreement lived at great distances from each other, rendering the pact ineffective.

Along with Fanning, who was a personal friend, Nash was accused of extorting money from Hillsborough's residents. Regulator leaders attempted to have Nash tried for corruption, but the charges against him were dismissed. In September 1770, a group of Regulators took control of Hillsborough, forcing Nash and other public officials to flee for fear of bodily harm. Nash subsequently fought alongside Governor William Tryon in the Battle of Alamance against the Regulator militia. He served in the "Lower House" of the colonial Assembly in 1771 and from 1773 to 1775 as a representative for Hillsborough.

In 1774, Royal Governor Josiah Martin postponed the scheduled convening of the Province of North Carolina House of Burgesses to prevent the North Carolina Assembly from selecting delegates to the proposed Continental Congress, which was to begin in Philadelphia in September. In response, members of the Assembly, many of whom would later become Patriot supporters, convened the First North Carolina Provincial Congress in August 1774. Nash and his brother, Abner, were both elected to that body, along with 69 other North Carolinians, which then selected delegates to the Continental Congress. Governor Martin condemned the Provincial Congress as an extra-legal body not permitted to assemble and represent the people of North Carolina. In an attempt to quash its work, the Governor called the House of Burgesses to convene on April 5, 1775, but the Second North Carolina Provincial Congress met in a session several hours before the Assembly was set to open and many of the congressional delegates, including Nash, voted to support the work of the Continental and Provincial Congresses. In response, Martin dissolved the Assembly on April 8, 1775. Nash was a representative of the House of Burgesses that met until April 8. The Royal government would never again call an Assembly to session in North Carolina.

== American Revolutionary War ==
=== Southern theater ===
In 1775, Nash served in the Third North Carolina Provincial Congress, which organized eight regiments of soldiers on instructions from the Continental Congress. Later that year, the Provincial Congress appointed Nash lieutenant colonel of the 1st North Carolina Regiment under the command of then-colonel James Moore. In November, the 1st North Carolina was formally integrated into the Continental Army organization. Nash served as an officer under Moore during the maneuvers that led up to the Battle of Moore's Creek Bridge in February 1776 but, like Moore, did not participate in the battle, arriving after its conclusion.

During April 1776, Nash was promoted to colonel to replace Moore, who had been promoted to brigadier general. Nash took part in the expedition to aid Charleston in 1776, which culminated in the Battle of Sullivan's Island. Immediately prior to that engagement, Nash had been ordered by Major General Charles Lee, commander of the Southern Department, to relieve William Moultrie's South Carolina troops on Sullivan's Island, but the British assault prevented that relief. Moultrie would go on to successfully defend the island from a much larger British force, while Nash's unit guarded the unfinished rear of Fort Sullivan.

=== Philadelphia campaign ===
Nash returned with his regiment to North Carolina in anticipation of joining General George Washington's army in the north, but fears of British and Indian attacks in Georgia prevented any such action, and caused Nash to remain in his home state. On February 5, 1777, he was promoted to brigadier general by the Continental Congress. He was also tasked with recruiting more soldiers from the western part of the state, but was forced to abandon that task after James Moore's death on April 15, 1777. Nash was then placed in command of the North Carolina brigade. Although fellow North Carolinian Robert Howe's commission as a brigadier general predated Nash's, Howe had been made commander of the Southern Department of the Continental Army, and he was forced to remain in command of the troops defending South Carolina. Nash marched north to join Washington's army and commanded all nine North Carolina Continental Army regiments at the Battle of Brandywine.

=== Battle of Germantown and death ===
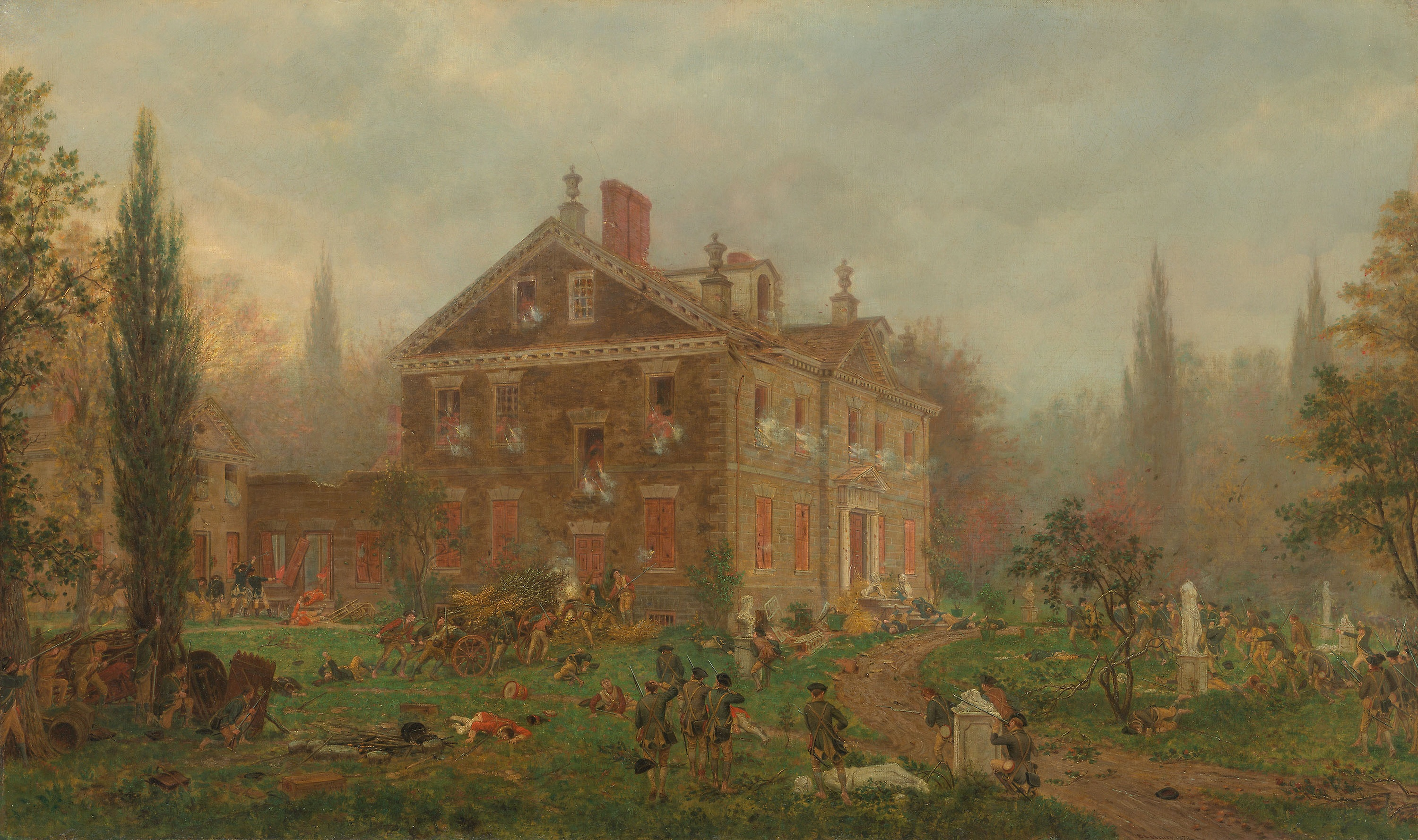
An artist's depiction of the fighting around the Chew House at Germantown, near where Nash was mortally wounded

After the British captured Philadelphia on September 26, 1777, Washington took to the offensive and struck at the main part of the British Army near Philadelphia in the Battle of Germantown on October 4. Initially, the North Carolina brigade was intended to serve in the Continental Army's reserve but Washington, out of a desire to defend his flank, ordered Nash into action. Nash was commanding a fighting retreat, slowly moving his unit backwards to stall the British advance, when he was mortally wounded by a cannonball that struck him in the hip and killed his horse. The same cannonball killed Major James Witherspoon, son of John Witherspoon, the president of Princeton University and a signer of the Declaration of Independence. Nash may have also been blinded by a musket ball that struck him in the head. Thomas Paine, who saw him taken off the battlefield, later stated that Nash's wounds had made him unrecognizable.

Nash was treated by Washington's personal physician, James Craik, who could not stem his bleeding, which was reported to have fully soaked through two mattresses. Nash succumbed to his wounds on October 7 at a private residence near Kulpsville, Pennsylvania. His final words are alleged to have been "From the first dawn of the Revolution I have been ever on the side of liberty and my country". He was buried in the Towamencin Mennonite Meetinghouse Cemetery in Towamencin Township, Pennsylvania, on October 9, 1777, along with other officers who had perished at Germantown. Most of the Continental Army's senior officers, including Washington himself, attended the funeral service. Nash's friend and colleague Alexander Martin, who later became Governor of the State of North Carolina and who had witnessed Nash's wounding, later composed a funeral poem in the fallen general's honor.

== Legacy ==
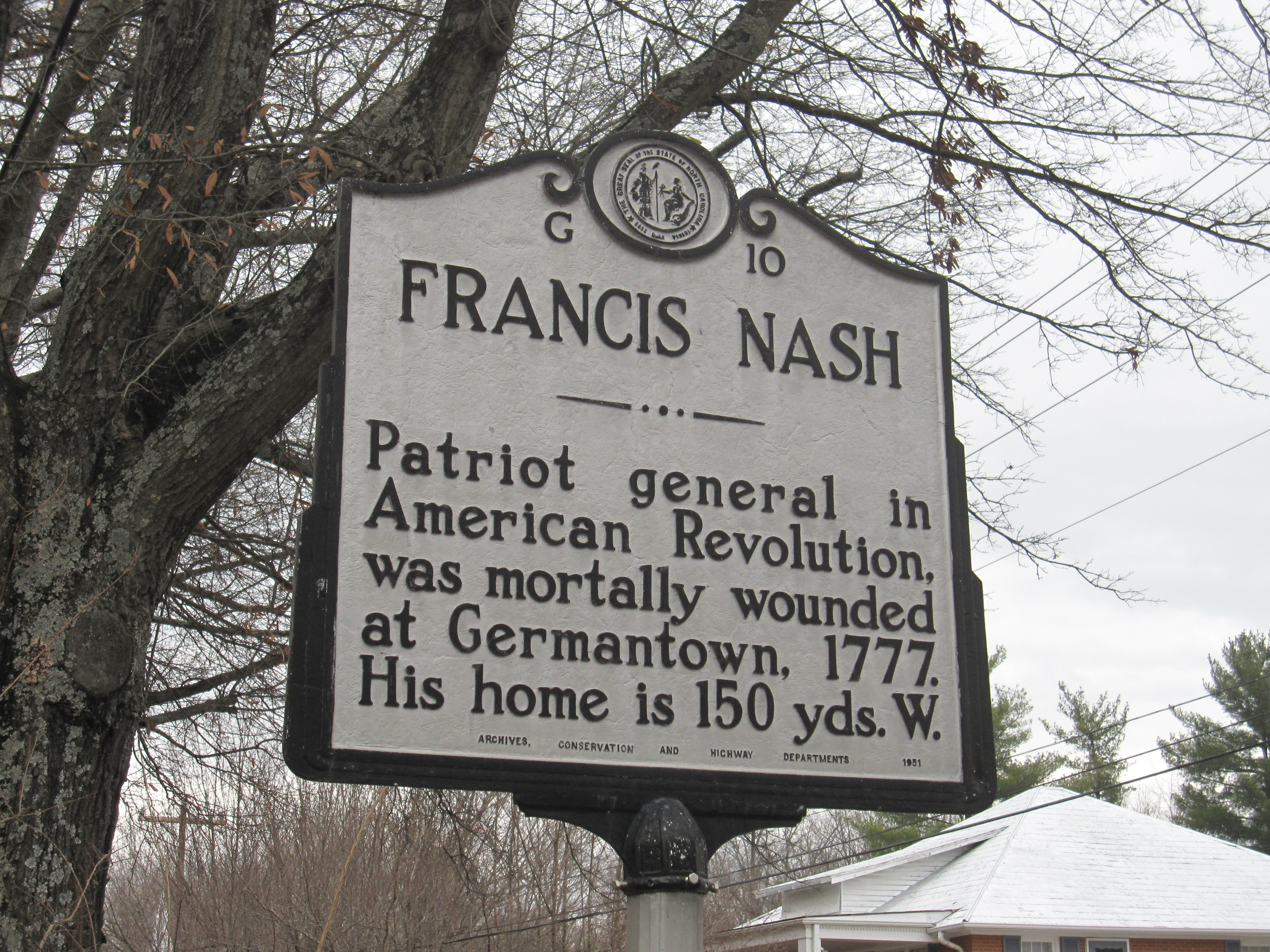
Highway Historical Marker near Nash's home in Hillsborough, North Carolina

Nash was one of ten Patriot generals who died during the American Revolutionary War. After his death, on April 29, 1784, Congress awarded his heirs a land grant representing 84 months of Continental Army service, which exceeded Nash's actual service time. Nashville, Tennessee (originally called "Fort Nashborough"), Nashville, North Carolina, the city of Nashville, Georgia, and Nash County, North Carolina, are named in his honor. In 1906, a stone arch was erected on the grounds of Guilford Courthouse National Military Park in Nash's honor, but it was demolished in 1937. Nash's home in Hillsborough is now known as the Nash-Hooper House, as it was purchased by William Hooper, a signatory to the Declaration of Independence, after Nash's death. In 1938, a historical marker was placed near the house commemorating Nash's life and service. The Nash-Hooper House was declared a National Historic Landmark in 1971. It is located in the Hillsborough Historic District.
