= John Sheppard (North Carolina) =

American Revolutionary War soldier

Colonel John Sheppard (circa 1750–circa 1790) was a Revolutionary War soldier and commander of the Wayne County Regiment of the North Carolina militia. His father, Abraham Sheppard was a planter, politician, and commander of the Dobbs County Regiment and 10th North Carolina Regiment. He also had a brother, Abraham Sheppard, Jr., who served with John in the Dobbs County Regiment.

== Early life ==
Little is known about his early life. He was born about 1750, probably in Dobbs County, North Carolina. His father was Abraham Sheppard. Abraham Sheppard was a merchant-planter and owned a plantation, Contentnea, in Dobbs County. John had at least six siblings, including brothers Benjamin, Abraham Jr., and four sisters, one of whom (Pherebe or Phoebe Sheppard) married Colonel James Glasgow, a fellow colonel in the North Carolina militia. His father became a widower with three small daughters by his first wife and married the sister of James Glasgow, Martha Jones Glasgow. They had a large family. Abraham died in or after 1790. John's death date is not known for sure but was about 1790.

== Military service ==
John was commissioned as a captain under the command of his father in the Dobbs County Regiment in either 1775 or early 1776. John saw action with his regiment at the Battle of Moore's Creek Bridge on February 27, 1776. John's company consisted of 52 officers and soldiers, including Lieutenant William Faircloth, Ensign Samuel Pope, Sergeant Zachariah Coward, Sergeant Hezekiah Rice, Sergeant Zachariah Rice, Corporal James Davis, and Corporal Frederick Eckles. There were also privates Abram and William Sheppard in his company.

In April of 1777, he was commissioned to the rank of major in the Dobbs County Regiment, which was then commanded by Colonel James Glasgow. After Colonel William Caswell took over command of the regiment, they led the regiment in the Battle of Briar Creek in Georgia on March 3, 1779. When Lieutenant Colonel Henry Goodman resigned his position in the regiment due to illness, John was commissioned as a lieutenant colonel on July 30, 1779.

When the North Carolina General Assembly created Wayne County from Dobbs County on November 2, 1779, John Sheppard was commissioned as a colonel of the newly created Wayne County Regiment of the North Carolina militia. He shared command of the regiment with Colonel Benjamin Exum until the end of the war. Colonel Sheppard led the regiment at the Siege of Charleston (March 28 to May 12, 1780). They were not captured when Charleston was captured because they were stationed eight miles north of the city.
