= North Carolina General Assembly of October 1784 =

Legislative term in US state of North Carolina

9th North Carolina General Assembly (October 1784)
←	April 1784	1785	→

Overview
- Legislative body: North Carolina General Assembly
- Jurisdiction: North Carolina, United States
- Meeting place: New Bern
- Term: 1784

Senate
- Members: 55 Senators authorized
- Speaker: Richard Caswell
- Clerk: John Haywood
- Assistant Clerk: Sherwood Haywood

House of Commons
- Members: 116 Delegates authorized
- Speaker: William Blount
- Clerk: John Hunt
- Assistant Clerk: John Haywood

Sessions
- 1st: October 25, 1784 – November 26, 1784
- 2nd: unknown – June 1785

The North Carolina General Assembly of October 1784 met in New Bern from October 25, 1784 to November 26, 1784. The assembly consisted of the 116 members of the North Carolina House of Commons and 55 senators of North Carolina Senate elected by the voters on August 20, 1784. As prescribed by the 1776 Constitution of North Carolina the General Assembly elected Richard Caswell as Governor of North Carolina and members of the Council of State.

== Councilors of State ==
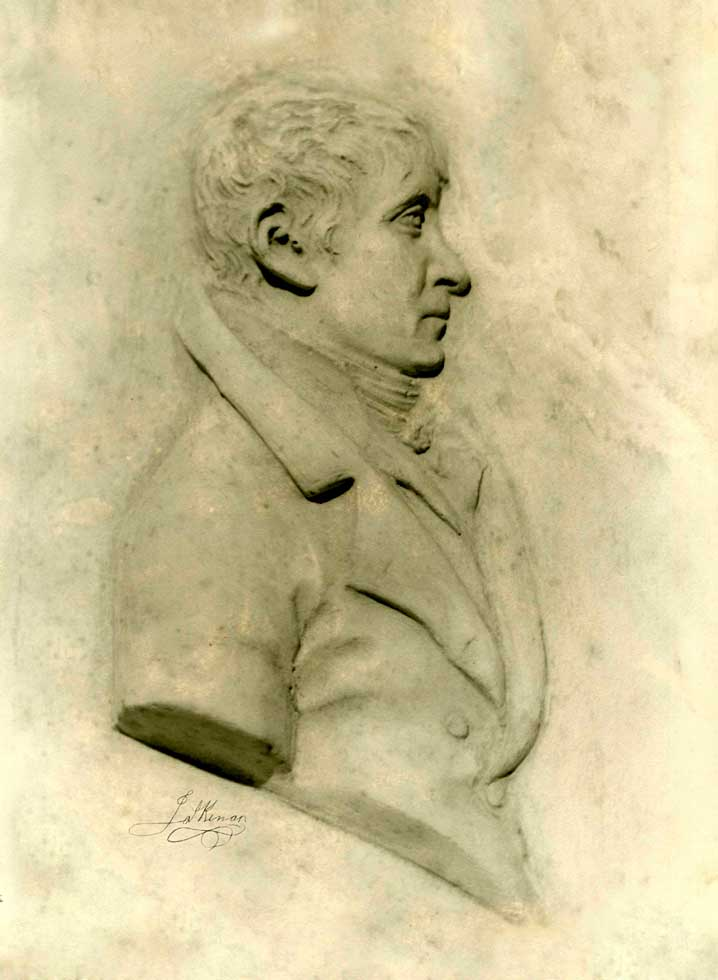
James Kenan

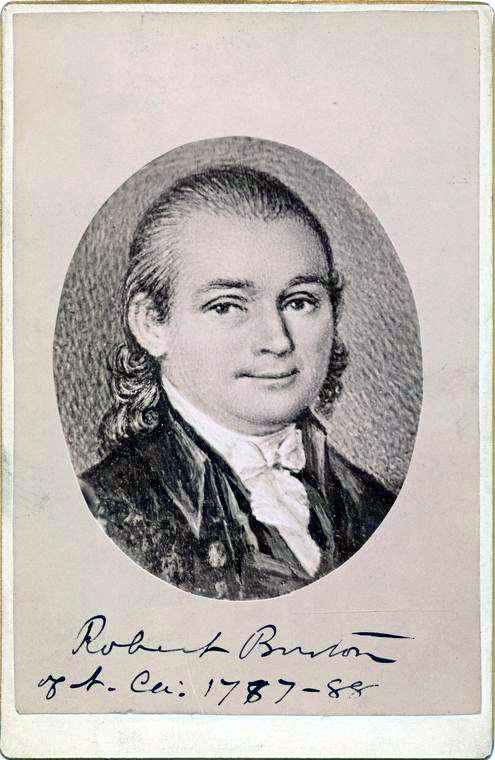
Robert Burton

As prescribed by the 1776 Constitution of North Carolina, the General Assembly elected the governor and the following members of the North Carolina Council of State:

- Joseph Leech, Craven County (President)
- James Kenan, Duplin County (President pro tempore)
- Winston Caswell, Dobbs County (Clerk)
- James Armstrong, Pitt County
- John Hawks, Craven County
- Robert Burton, Granville County
- Thomas Eaton, Warren County
- Abraham Sheppard, Dobbs County

James Glasgow continued as North Carolina Secretary of State (served 1777–1798). The assembly elected Memucan Hunt (served 1784–1787) as first statewide North Carolina State Treasurer. Alfred Moore continued (served 1782–1791) as North Carolina Attorney General.

== Assembly membership ==
There were 55 counties in North Carolina in 1784. Each county was authorized to elect two representatives to the House of Commons and one delegate to the Senate. In addition, the six districts were authorized one delegate each. (Sullivan, Washington, Davidson, and Green counties would later become part of Tennessee in 1796.) Richard Caswell was elected Governor of North Carolina by this General Assembly but did not take the governor's office until 1785. According to a book by the Secretary of State edited by Cheney and published in 1974, this assembly had a second session that concluded in June 1784.

=== House of Commons members ===
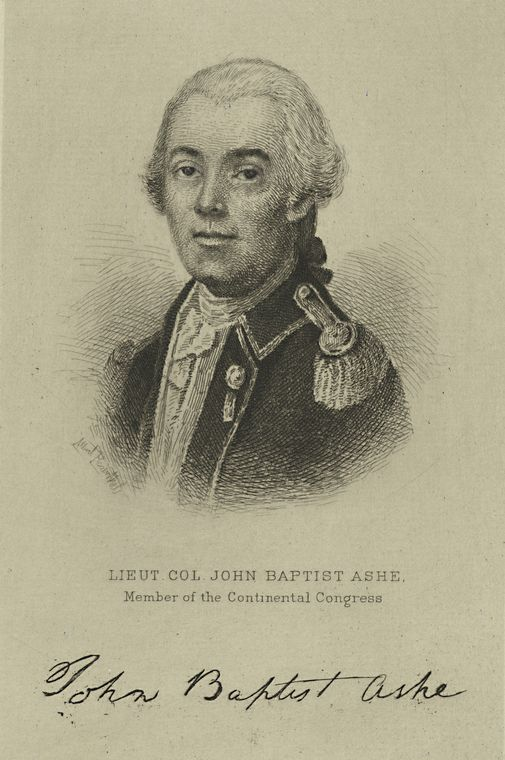
John Baptista Ashe, Halifax County

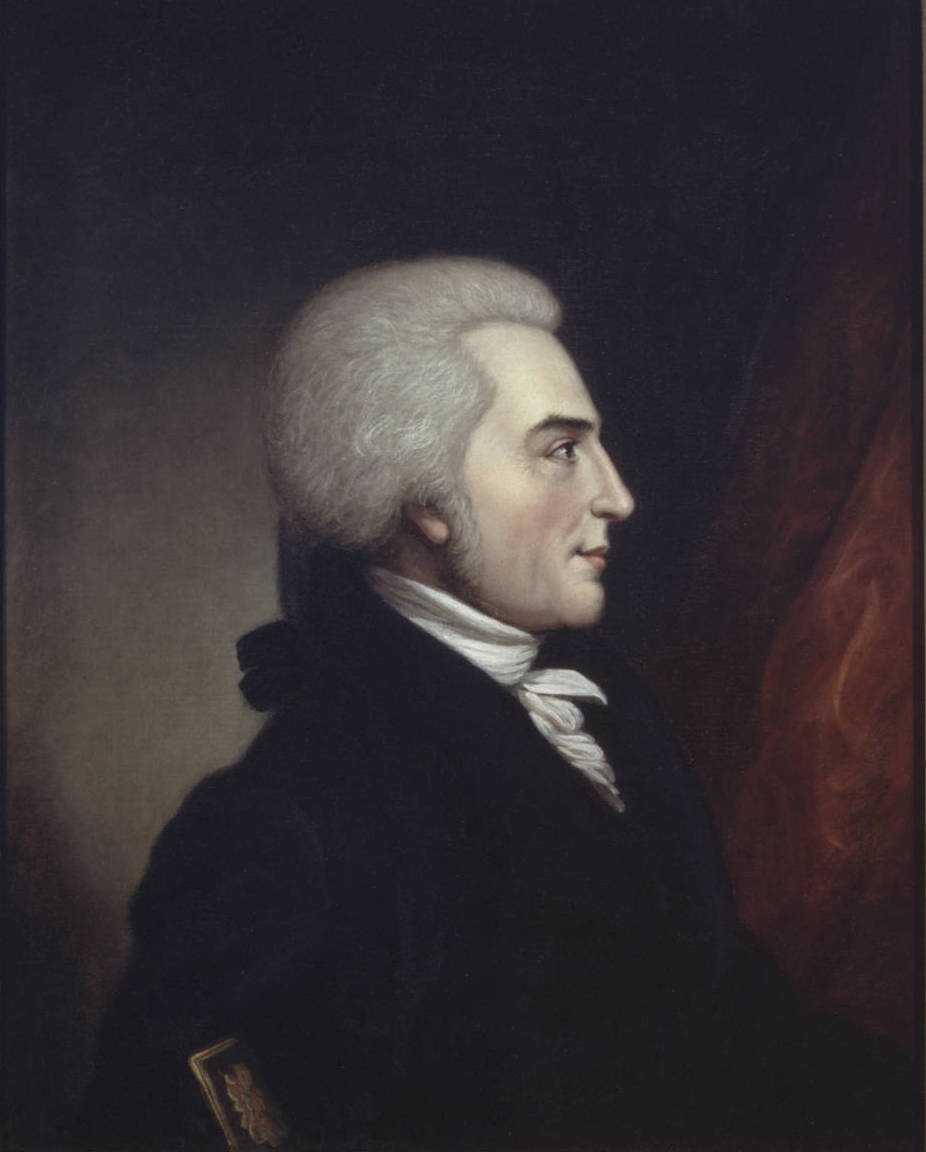
William Richardson Davie, Northampton County

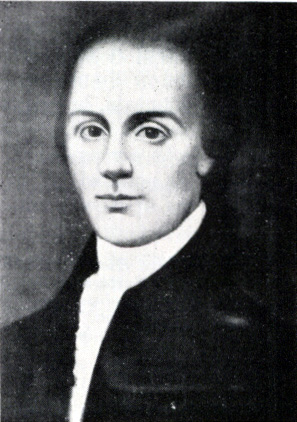
Abner Nash, Jones County

The House of Commons delegates elected a Speaker (William Blount), Clerk (John Hunt), Assistant Clerk (John Haywood), Doorkeeper, and Assistant Doorkeeper. The following delegates to the House of Commons were elected by the voters of North Carolina to represent each county and district:

County/District	Delegate
Anson	James Terry
Anson	John DeJarnett
Beaufort	Thomas Alderson
Beaufort	John Gray Blount
Bertie	Zedekiah Stone
Bertie	Andrew Oliver
Bladen	Samuel Cain
Bladen	Peter Robeson
Brunswick	Jacob Leonard
Brunswick	David Flowers
Burke	Joseph McDowell
Burke	Waightstill Avery
Camden	Benjamin Jones
Camden	Abner Harrison
Carteret	John Easton
Carteret	Eli West
Caswell	Edward Clay (Note: Edward Clay was accused of theft and expelled on November 26, 1784)
Caswell	William Moore
Chatham	Elisha Cain
Chatham	Joseph Stewart
Chowan	Clement Hall
Chowan	Michael Payne
Craven	William Bryan
Craven	William Blount (Note: William Blount was a delegate to the Continental Congress/Confederation Congress in 1782–1783; 1786–1787. He also signed the Declaration of Independence.)
Cumberland	Edward Winslow
Cumberland	James Emmett
Currituck	Joseph Ferebee
Currituck	Dr. James White (Note: James White was a delegate to the Continental Congress/Confederation Congress, 1786–1788. He was also a non-voting member of the U.S. Congress from the Southwest Territory in 1794.)
Davidson	Elijah Robertson
Davidson	Ephraim McLean
Dobbs	William Caswell
Dobbs	John Sheppard
Duplin	Robert Dickson
Duplin	Thomas Gray
Edgecombe	Robert Diggs
Edgecombe	John Dalvin (Dolvin)
Fayette	William Rand
Fayette	Alexander McAllister
Franklin	Thomas Sherrod
Franklin	Durham Hall
Gates	Joseph Riddick
Gates	Seth Riddick
Granville	Thomas Person
Granville	Thornton Yancey
Greene	Alexander Outlaw
Greene	Unknown
Guilford	John Hamilton
Guilford	John Leak
Halifax	Benjamin McCulloch
Halifax	John Baptista Ashe (Note: John Baptista Ashe was a delegate from North Carolina to the Continental Congress/Confederation Congress in 1787.)
Hertford	William Hill
Hertford	Thomas Brickell
Hyde	John Eborne
Hyde	William Russell
Johnston	Joseph Boon
Johnston	Kedar Powell
Jones	William Randall
Jones	Abner Nash (Note: Abner Nash was a delegate to the Continental Congress/Confederation Congress, 1782–1783. He was also the 2nd Governor of the state (1780–1781))
Lincoln	John Sloan
Lincoln	Daniel McKissick
Martin	Nathan Mayo
Martin	Thomas Hunter (Note: Thomas Hunter was deemed ineligible for office and replaced by John Ross after a new election.)
Martin	John Ross
Mecklenburg	Caleb Phifer
Mecklenburg	David Wilson
Montgomery	Mark Allen
Montgomery	William Kendall
Moore	John Cox
Moore	William Seals
Nash	Micajah Thomas
Nash	John Bonds
New Hanover	Timothy Bloodworth (Note: Timothy Bloodworth was a delegate to the Continental Congress/Confederation Congress in 1786.)
New Hanover	James Bloodworth
Northampton	James Vaughan
Northampton	William Richardson Davie (Note: William Richardson Davie was the 10th state Governor (1798–1799).)
Onslow	Edward Starkey
Onslow	Daniel Yates
Orange	Alexander Mebane
Orange	John Butler
Pasquotank	Thomas Reading
Pasquotank	John Smithson, Jr.
Perquimans	John Reed
Perquimans	Robert Riddick
Pitt	John Jordan
Pitt	Richard Moye
Randolph	Joseph Robbins
Randolph	Aaron Hill
Richmond	Robert Webb
Richmond	Charles Robertson (Note: Charles Robertson was accused of being a loyalist during the American Revolution and expelled on November 1, 1784.)
Rowan	William Sharpe (Note: William Sharpe was a delegate from North Carolina to the 2nd Continental Congress in 1779–1781.)
Rowan	James Kerr
Rutherford	Richard Singleton
Rutherford	James Withrow
Sampson	David Dodd
Sampson	John Hay
Sullivan	William Cage
Sullivan	David Looney
Surry	Joel Lewis
Surry	James Martin
Tyrrell	Benjamin Spruill
Tyrrell	Nathan Hooker
Wake	Tignal Jones
Wake	John Humphries
Warren	John Macon
Warren	James Payne
Washington	Charles Robertson
Washington	Landon Carter
Wayne	William Alford
Wayne	John Handley
Wilkes	Benjamin Herndon
Wilkes	Jesse Franklin
Edenton District	Stephen Cabarrus
Halifax District	Henry Montfort
Hillsborough District	Archibald Lytle
New Bern District	Spyars Singleton
Salisbury District	Spruce McCoy (McCay, McKay)
Wilmington District	Archibald MacLaine

=== Senate members ===
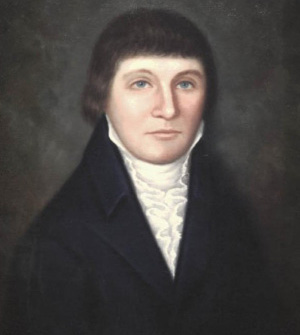
Richard Caswell, Dobbs County

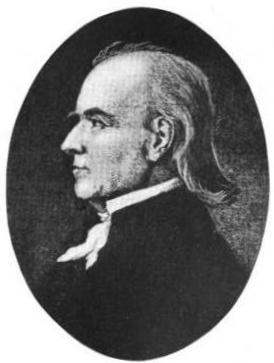
William Lenoir, Wilkes County

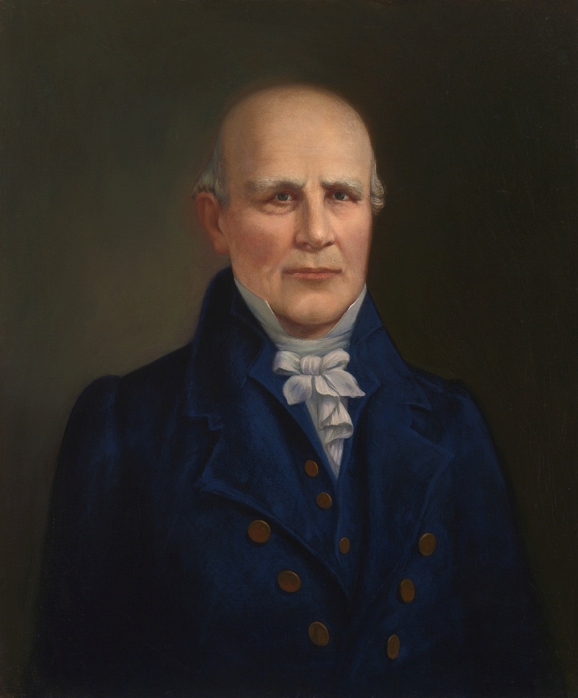
Nathaniel Macon, Warren County

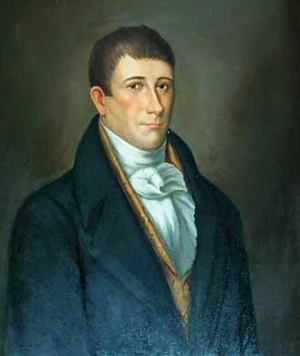
Benjamin Williams, Johnston County

The Senators elected a President/Speaker (Richard Caswell, Sr.), Clerk (John Haywood), Assistant Clerk (Sherwood Haywood), Doorkeeper, and Assistant Doorkeeper. The following Senators were elected by the voters of North Carolina to represent each county:

County	Senator
Anson	Thomas Wade
Beaufort	John Smaw
Bertie	Jonathan Jaycocks
Bladen	Thomas Owen
Brunswick	William Walters
Burke	Charles McDowell
Camden	Isaac Gregory
Carteret	Enoch Ward
Caswell	Vacant
Chatham	Ambrose Ramsey
Chowan	William Boritz
Craven	James Coor
Cumberland	David Smith
Currituck	James Phillips
Davidson	Unknown / Vacant
Dobbs	Richard Caswell, Sr. (Note: Richard Caswell was a delegate from North Carolina to the 1st and 2nd Continental Congress in 1774 and 1775.)
Duplin	James Gillespie
Edgecombe	Isaac Sessums (Note: Isaac Sessums died while in office.)
Fayette	Thomas Armstrong
Franklin	Vacant
Gates	William Baker
Granville	John Taylor
Greene	Unknown / Vacant
Guilford	James Galloway
Halifax	Nicholas Long
Hertford	John Baker
Hyde	Abraham Jones
Johnston	Benjamin Williams
Jones	Frederick Hargett
Lincoln	Robert Alexander
Martin	Whitmell Hill (Note: Whitmell Hill was a delegate from North Carolina to the 2nd Continental Congress in 1778–1780.)
Mecklenburg	James Harris
Montgomery	Samuel Parsons
Moore	Henry Lightfoot
Nash	Hardy Griffin
New Hanover	John A. Campbell
Northampton	Allen Jones (Note: Allen Jones was a delegate from North Carolina to the 2nd Continental Congress in 1779–1780.)
Onslow	Thomas Johnston
Orange	William McCauley
Pasquotank	Thomas Relfe
Perquimans	John Skinner
Pitt	John Williams (Note: John Williams was a delegate from North Carolina to the 2nd Continental Congress in 1778–1779.)
Randolph	Thomas Dougan
Richmond	Charles Medlock
Rowan	Matthew Locke
Rutherford	James Miller
Sampson	Richard Clinton
Sullivan	Unknown / Vacant
Surry	John Armstrong
Tyrrell	John Warrington
Wake	Joel Lane
Warren	Nathaniel Macon
Washington	William Cocke
Wayne	Burwell Mooring
Wilkes	William Lenoir

== Legislation ==
This assembly approved an act to require county courts to conduct a census of white and black residents. Other acts concerned the following:

- public taxes
- taxes on imports
- sale of confiscated property
- regulation of superior courts,
- real estate
- sales of slaves
- appointment of county commissioners
- building public roads, ferries, and bridges
- providing for the safe keeping of the estates of idiots and lunatics
- repealing the act from the previous assembling concerning sale of western lands to the U.S. Congress,
- accurate accounting of war service for pensioners
- fraudulent claims for western lands
- prohibiting loyalists from holding public office and establishing an oath for those taking public office
- prohibiting paid public servants from holding office in the assembly
- establishing a court for dealing with foreign mercantile transactions and transient persons and maritime affairs
- prevention of horse stealing
- regulating county court of pleas and quarter sessions
- amending the act of the April 1784 assembly dealing with when the assembly would meet
- changing the start date of the assembly from the first Monday in October to the first Monday in November
- creation of the District of Morgan, which would include Burke, Lincoln, Rutherford and Wilkes Counties
- creation of the District of Washington, which would include Washington, Sullivan, Greene, and Davidson Counties
- encouraging learning in Salisbury District, which dealt with the former Liberty Hall academy, which was renamed Salisbury Academy in Rowan County
- levying a tax in Salisbury and Hillsborough Districts to repair district buildings
- building a gaol in Wilmington
- establishing principal streets in Fayetteville
- inspecting tobacco in Hillsborough
- disposition of the estate of Simon Cleary
- establishing a town in Jones County
- establishing the town of Morgan
- creating a local tax in Warren and Franklin counties for building public buildings
- changing taxes in New Bern District
- empowering Wayne County to establish a tax to pay for public buildings
- empowering Bladen County commissioners to purchase land for public buildings
- changing the location of public buildings in Mecklenburg County from Charlotte to a more central location
- clearing and opening the Tar River and Fishing Creek
- empowering commissioners in Northampton County to repair public buildings
- extending the dividing line between Tyrrell and Hyde counties
- several acts dealing with the estates of individuals

For additional details of the legislation of this assembly, see Legislative Documents

== See also ==
- List of North Carolina state legislatures
