= Wayne County Regiment =

American colonial military unit

- Active: 1779-1783
- Allegiance: (United States) North Carolina
- Branch: North Carolina militia
- Type: Militia
- Engagements: Battle of Camden, Battle of Cowpens, Battle of Guilford Courthouse

Commanders
- Notable commanders: Col. Benjamin Exum; Col. John Sheppard

The Wayne County Regiment was a unit of the North Carolina militia that served during the American Revolution. The North Carolina General Assembly created Wayne County and its regiment of militia out of part of Dobbs County and its regiment of militia on November 2, 1779. The officers were appointed and commissioned by the governor of North Carolina. The regiment was disbanded at the end of the war.

== Officers ==
The Wayne County Regiment was part of the New Bern District Brigade of the North Carolina militia, commanded by Brigadier General Richard Caswell. The following listings show two known commanders of the Wayne County regiment:

- Col. John Sheppard Sr. (1779–1783)
- Colonel Benjamin Exum (2nd Colonel) (1779–1783)

John Sheppard was the son of Colonel Abraham Sheppard of the Dobbs County Regiment. He served as a captain, major and lieutenant colonel in the Dobbs County regiment from 1776 to 1779 until he was commissioned as a colonel in the Wayne County regiment after it was created on November 2, 1779. Both John Sheppard and Benjamin Exum served as colonels and commanders jointly of the Wayne County Regiment. Colonel Sheppard was led the regiment during the Siege of Charleston. The regiment was stationed eight miles north of Charleston and was not captured when Charleston surrendered on May 12, 1780. After the war, John Sheppard was a representative in the North Carolina state legislature in 1784–1785.

== Known engagements ==
The Wayne County Regiment was involved in six known battles and skirmishes:

- March 28 to May 12, 1780, Siege of Charleston 1780, South Carolina
- 8/11/1780, Battle of Little Lynches Creek, South Carolina
- August 16, 1780, Battle of Camden, South Carolina
- January 17, 1781, Battle of Cowpens, South Carolina
- March 15, 1781, Battle of Guilford Court House, North Carolina
- August 17, 1781, Webber's Bridge, North Carolina

== See also ==
- Southern Campaigns: Pension Transactions for a description of the transcription effort by Will Graves
- Southern theater of the American Revolutionary War
- North Carolina State Navy
- List of North Carolina militia units in the American Revolution
