= Willoughby (given name) =

Willoughby is a masculine given name which may refer to:

- Willoughby Aston (disambiguation), three Aston baronets
- Willoughby J. Edbrooke (1843–1896), American architect
- Willoughby Gray (1916–1993), English actor
- Willoughby Hamilton (1864–1943), Irish tennis, football and badminton player
- Willoughby D. Miller (1853–1907), American dentist and the first oral microbiologist
- Willoughby Norrie, 1st Baron Norrie (1893–1977), British Army lieutenant-general, Governor of South Australia and Governor-General of New Zealand
- Willoughby Sharp (1936–2008), American artist, independent curator, independent publisher, gallerist, teacher, and author
- Willoughby Shortland (1804–1869), British naval officer and colonial administrator, first Colonial Secretary of New Zealand, President of the island of Nevis, and Governor of Tobago
- Willoughby Smith (1828–1891), English electrical engineer who discovered the photoconductivity of selenium
- Willoughby Williams (died 1802), American politician, father of Willoughby Williams Jr.
- Willoughby Williams Jr. (1798-1882), American banker and sheriff
