= Caswell (surname) =

Caswell is a surname. Notable people with the surname include:

- Albert Edward Caswell (1884–1954), American physicist and educator
- Alexis Caswell (1799–1877), American mathematician, scientist and educator
- Allan Caswell (born 1952), Australian songwriter
- Berengera Caswell (1828–1849), Canadian mill and factory worker
- Bill Caswell, American country music singer, songwriter and musician
- Brian Caswell (born 1954), Australian author
- Brian Caswell (footballer) (born 1956), English footballer
- Bruce Caswell (born 1949), American politician
- Burr Caswell (1807–1896), American frontiersman
- Chris Caswell, musician
- Eddie Caswell, Welsh rugby player in the 1920s and coach in the 1930s and 1940s
- Edward S. Caswell (1861–1938), Canadian publisher and editor
- Emil George Henry Caswell (1854–?), Anglican clergyman
- Gay Caswell (born 1948), Canadian writer and politician
- G. N. Caswell (1818 cricketer), English cricketer
- Hollis Caswell (1901–1988), American educator
- John Caswell (1654 or 1655–1712), English mathematician and Oxford professor of astronomy
- Lucien B. Caswell (1827–1919), American politician
- Luke Caswell, better known as Cazwell, a gay American rapper
- Oliver A. Caswell, member of the Wisconsin State Assembly in 1872
- Peter Caswell (born 1957), English football goalkeeper
- Richard Caswell (1729–1789), first and fifth governor of North Carolina
- Robert Caswell (1946–2006), Australian screenwriter
- Samuel Bradford Caswell (1828–1898), American mining engineer, judge and Los Angeles government official
- Sarah Heritage Caswell (1740–1794), American political hostess
- William Caswell (1754–1785), American politician
- William E. Caswell (1947–2001), American physicist
