= An Ordinance for appointing a Governor, Council of State, and Secretary =

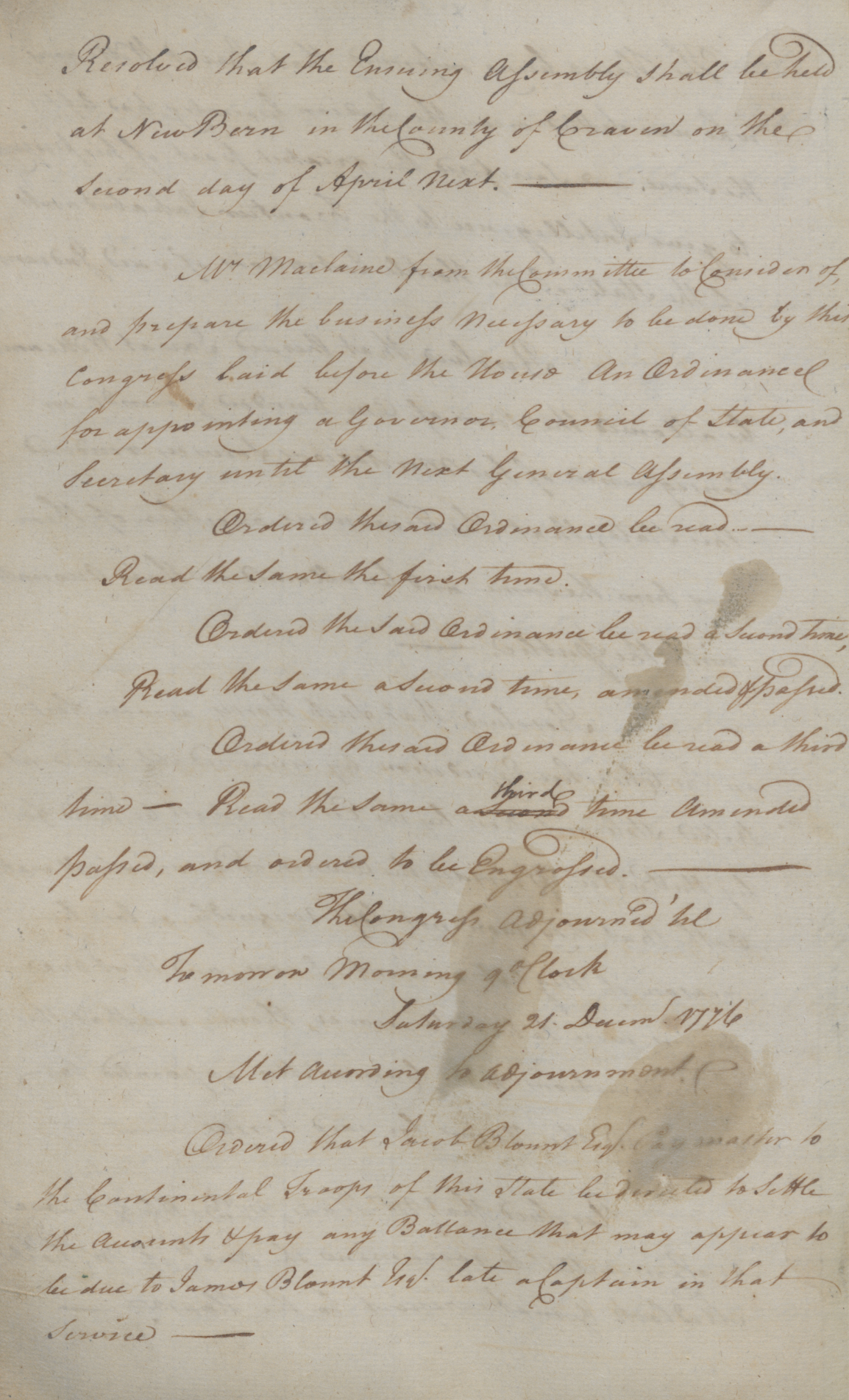
- Record of the Ordinance in the journal of the Fifth Provincial Congress

North Carolina Provincial Congress
- Long title: An Ordinance for appointing a Governor, Council of State, and Secretary, until the next General Assembly
- Enacted: December 20, 1776
- Effective: December 23, 1776
- Status: Expired

The North Carolina Provincial Congress passed the Ordinance for appointing a Governor, Council of State, and Secretary appointing Richard Caswell to serve as governor of North Carolina on December 20, 1776. Caswell took the oath of office at New Bern, North Carolina, on January 10, 1777, and held office until following the first constitutional election later that year.

The Constitution of North Carolina called for the North Carolina General Assembly to elect the governor and other state officials. As the Assembly would not meet until the following year, the outgoing Provincial Congress moved to appoint a governor, secretary of state, and members of the North Carolina Council of State to administer the government in the interim. On December 20, Archibald Maclaine introduced an ordinance naming Caswell governor for a term of office commencing immediately after the dissolution of the Congress. The ordinance named James Glasgow secretary of state and Cornelius Harnett, Thomas Person, William Dry, William Haywood, Joseph Leach, and Thomas Eaton councilors. The ordinance was read three times and adopted, with amendments.

== Bibliography ==
- Clark, Walter, ed. (1904). The State Records of North Carolina. Vol. 23: Laws 1715–1776. Goldsboro, NC: Nash Brothers.
- North Carolina (1776). "Journal of the Fifth Provincial Congress". North Carolina Digital Collections. State Archives of North Carolina.
- Mobley, Joe A. (2016). North Carolina Governor Richard Caswell: Founding Father and Revolutionary Hero. Charleston, SC: History Press.
