= James Armstrong (North Carolina politician) =

American colonial general (died 1794)

- Died: 1794; Pitt County, North Carolina
- Military career
- Allegiance: United States of America
- Branch: North Carolina militia
- Service years: 1776-1781
- Rank: Colonel
- Units: New Bern District Minutemen, Pitt County Regiment, 4th North Carolina Regiment, 8th North Carolina Regiment
- Commands: 4th North Carolina Regiment
- Conflicts: Battle of Stono Ferry

James Armstrong (died 1794) was a well-to-do planter from Pitt County, North Carolina and served as an officer in the Revolutionary War.

== Revolutionary War service ==
Armstrong's service record included the following

- 1776–1781, 8th North Carolina Regiment, Captain in the New Bern District Minutemen, then Pitt County Regiment of the North Carolina militia
- November 26, 1776, Commissioned a Colonel
- June 1, 1778, commander of 4th North Carolina Regiment
- June 20, 1779, wounded at the Battle of Stono Ferry in South Carolina
- January 1781, retired on half pay
- 1781, appointed Brig. Gen. (Pro Tempore) for very short while when the NC General Assembly thought (incorrectly) that BG William Caswell had resigned.

== Post war years ==
Armstrong was active in politics after the war

- 1782, Commissioner of Confiscated Property for the District of New Bern
- 1784, elected by the North Carolina General Assembly of October 1784 to serve as a member of the North Carolina Council of State
- 1788 to 1790, served in the North Carolina House of Commons
- November 1789, represented Pitt County at the Fayetteville North Carolina Constitutional convention
- 1794, died in Pitt County, family left the area

== Bibliography ==
- King, Henry Thomas (1911). "Sketches of Pitt County . . . 1704–1910".
- Rankin, Hugh F. (1971). The North Carolina Continentals. UNC Press Books. ISBN 9780807856628.
- William L. Saunders and Walter Clark, eds., Colonial and State Records of North Carolina, 26 vols. (1886–1907)
- Johnson, Elmer D. "James Armstrong". In Powell, William S. (ed.). Dictionary of North Carolina Biography. University of North Carolina Press – via NCpedia.
- "The Howell Collection of Historical Materials, University of North Carolina". 1884.
