= Farwell (surname) =

Farwell is a surname of English origin. At the time of the British Census of 1881, its relative frequency was highest in Dorset (84.1 times the British average), followed by Buteshire, Hampshire, Somerset, Surrey, Worcestershire, Cheshire, London and Northumberland. Notable people with the surname include:

- Arthur Farwell, American composer
- Byron Farwell, author and military historian
- Charles B. Farwell (1823–1903), American politician
- Sir Christopher Farwell (1877–1943), English judge
- Sir George Farwell (1845–1915), English judge
- George Michell Farwell (1911–1976), English-Australian novelist
- Heath Farwell, American football player
- Jane Farwell, dancer
- Jane Farwell Smith (1906–1997), American clubwoman
- John V. Farwell, American politician
- Lawrence Farwell, Chief Scientist of Brain Fingerprinting Laboratories, Inc
- Leonard J. Farwell (1819–1889), American politician
- Lyman Farwell (1864–1933), American architect and politician
- Nathan A. Farwell (1812–1893), American politician
- Oliver Atkins Farwell (1867–1944), American botanist (author abbreviation: Farw.)
- Ruth Farwell, British academic and civil servant

== See also ==
- Barwell (surname)
- Carnell
- Caswell (surname)
- Arkells
