= Hyde County Regiment =

American colonial military unit

- Active: 1775–1783
- Allegiance: (United States) North Carolina
- Branch: North Carolina militia
- Type: Militia
- Engagements: Skirmish on Cape Hatteras, Battle of Guilford Courthouse

Commanders
- Notable commanders: Col. Rotheas Latham; Col. Abraham Jones; Col. William Russel; Col. Burridge H. Selby

The Hyde County Regiment was a unit of the North Carolina militia that served during the American Revolution. Hyde County, formed in 1705, had a militia in colonial times that was used to defend the coast of the Province of North Carolina. The North Carolina General Assembly authorized the Hyde County Regiment on September 9, 1775, along with 34 other county regiments. The officers were appointed and commissioned by the Governor of North Carolina. The regiment was subordinated to the New Bern District Brigade of North Carolina militia on May 4, 1776. The regiment was disbanded at the end of the war.

== Officers ==
The following listings show the known commanders, officers, staff, and soldiers of the Wayne County regiment

- Colonel Rotheas Latham (1775–1779)
- Colonel Abraham Jones (1779–1783)
- Colonel William Russell (1779–1780)
- Colonel Burridge Hutchins Selby (1780–1783)

Rotheas Latham was born in East Bridgewater, Massachusetts in 1725. His parents were Thomas Latham and Deborah Hardin. He was a descendant of Pilgrim James Chilton. His family moved to Hyde County, North Carolina before 1750, where he was a prominent landowner and active in business and political affairs. He owned a mill and was appointed by Governor Arthur Dobbs to serve as justice of the peace in Hyde County. In 1773, he represented Hyde County in the North Carolina General Assembly in New Bern. On August 25, 1774, he again represented Hyde County in the Provincial Congress in New Bern. He represented Hyde County in the Provincial Congress of August 1775 in Hillsboro. He was appointed a colonel in the Hyde County Minutemen in 1775 and was also colonel of the unit when it became the Hyde County Regiment in September 1775. He again represented Hyde County in the Provincial Congress of April 1776 in Halifax. He was member of the North Carolina House of Commons in 1780 and 1781. He died in 1784 in Hyde County.

William Russel served in the senate of the North Carolina Legislature from 1777 to 1783.

== Known engagements ==
The Hyde County Regiment was involved in two known engagements: skirmish on Cape Hatteras on June 27, 1779 and the Battle of Guilford Court House on March 15, 1781.

== See also ==
- Southern Campaigns: Pension Transactions for a description of the transcription effort by Will Graves
- Southern theater of the American Revolutionary War
- North Carolina State Navy
- List of North Carolina militia units in the American Revolution
