= William White (North Carolina politician) =

American politician (1762–1811)

2nd Secretary of State of North Carolina
- In office 1798–1811
- Preceded by: James Glasgow
- Succeeded by: William Hill

Personal details
- Born: 1762
- Died: 1811 (aged 48–49)
- Relatives: Richard Caswell (father-in-law); David L. Swain (son-in-law)
- Occupation: Politician

William White (1762–1811) was the second North Carolina Secretary of State, serving from 1798 until 1811.

White represented Lenoir County in the state legislature, first in the North Carolina House of Commons and then in the North Carolina Senate, from the county's creation in 1792 until the legislature appointed him Secretary of State in 1798. The same year he built the White-Holman House, listed on the National Register of Historic Places in 1971.

He was served as Intendant of Police (mayor) of Raleigh from 1803-1806.

In 1811, White died in office. The legislature elected his former clerk, William Hill, to succeed him.

White's father-in-law was Governor Richard Caswell. White's daughter, Eleanor, married Governor David L. Swain in 1826.

Preceded by James Glasgow	North Carolina Secretary of State; 1798-1811	Succeeded by William Hill
