= Senator Exum =

Senator Exum may refer to:

- Benjamin Exum (fl. 1770s), North Carolina State Senate
- Nathaniel Exum (1940–2021), Maryland State Senate
- Tony Exum (born 1952), Colorado State Senate
