= Willoughby Williams Jr. =

American banker (1798–1882)

- Engraving of Williams by Alexander Hay Ritchie, ca. 1860
- Born: 1798
- Died: 1882 (aged 83–84)
- Occupations: Banker, sheriff
- Spouse: Nancy Nichols
- Children: 2 sons and a daughter
- Parent(s): Willoughby Williams; Nancy Glasgow
- Relatives: James Glasgow (maternal grandfather); Joseph McMinn (stepfather)

Willoughby Williams Jr. (1798–1882) was an American banker and sheriff from Tennessee.

== Early life ==
Willoughby Williams Jr. was born in 1798. He had five siblings. His father was Willoughby Williams, an American Revolutionary War veteran and former member of the North Carolina House of Representatives, who died in 1802, when he was only four years old. His mother was Nancy Glasgow (1771-1857), daughter of James Glasgow (1735-1819) who served as North Carolina Secretary of State from 1777 to 1798. She later remarried to married Joseph McMinn, who served as Governor of Tennessee from 1815 to 1821, and who as a result became his stepfather.

== Career ==
Williams served in the Seminole Wars. He served sheriff for Davidson County, Tennessee from 1830 to 1836. He later served as President of the Bank of Tennessee. He was a childhood friend of Sam Houston.

== Personal life ==
Williams married Nancy Nichol (1808–1844), daughter of John Nichol, a Nashville merchant. They lived in her family home in Nashville, Tennessee called Woodlawn, listed on the National Register of Historic Places since November 21, 1978. Later, they moved to Arkansas. Their two sons, John Henry Williams and Andrew, lived at Woodlawn.

== Death ==
Williams died Dec. 8,1882 at the home of his daughter in Louisville, Kentucky.
