= Carolina State Navy =

Carolina State Navy may refer to:

- North Carolina State Navy, a navy raised by the state of North Carolina during the American Revolutionary War
- South Carolina Navy, a navy raised by the state of South Carolina during the American Revolutionary War
