= Farwell =

Farwell may refer to:

== Places ==
In the United States:

- Farwell, Michigan
- Farwell, Minnesota
- Farwell, Nebraska
- Farwell, Pennsylvania
- Farwell, Texas

== Other uses ==
- Farwell (surname)

== See also ==
- Adams-Farwell
