= 1779 North Carolina gubernatorial election =

- May 3, 1779

Members of the General Assembly Majority of votes needed to win
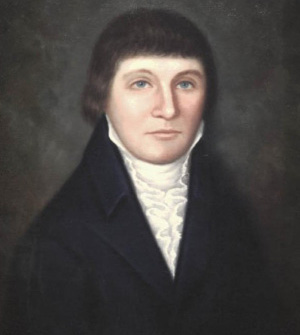
Nominee	Richard Caswell
Party	Moderate
Governor before election
Richard Caswell
Moderate
Elected Governor
Richard Caswell
Moderate

A gubernatorial election was held in North Carolina on May 3, 1779. The incumbent governor of North Carolina Richard Caswell was re-elected.

Caswell led a coalition of Western radicals and Cape Fear River moderates that dominated North Carolina politics during the late 1770s. The contentious issue of confiscation contributed to conflict between the North Carolina Senate and the House of Commons during 1779 that mirrored the rising Political factionalism in the legislature. Caswell remained personally popular despite the challenge to the radical–moderate coalition posed by the conservative resurgence.

The election was conducted by the North Carolina General Assembly in joint session. Caswell was elected unanimously on the first ballot.

== Bibliography ==
- Clark, Walter, ed. (1896). The State Records of North Carolina. Vol. 13, 1778–79. Winston, NC.
- Smith, Penelope Sue (1980). Creation of an American State: Politics in North Carolina, 1765–1789 (PhD thesis). Houston: Rice University.
