= 1777 North Carolina gubernatorial election =

- April 18, 1777

Members of the General Assembly Majority of votes needed to win
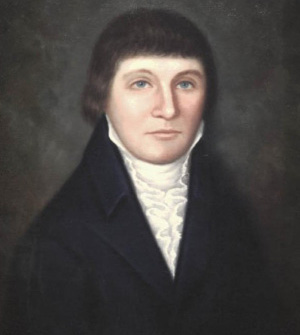
Nominee	Richard Caswell
Party	Moderate
Governor before election
Richard Caswell
Moderate
Elected Governor
Richard Caswell
Moderate

A gubernatorial election was held in North Carolina on April 18, 1777. The incumbent governor of North Carolina Richard Caswell was re-elected.

Caswell, a militia officer and former president of the North Carolina Provincial Congress, led a coalition of radical and moderate Whigs that displaced the previously-dominant conservative Political faction after 1776. Factional politics reflected regional interests, with the predominantly Western radicals aligned with moderates from the Cape Fear River against the Albemarle conservatives. Following adoption of the Constitution of North Carolina in December 1776, Caswell was appointed to serve as governor until the election of a successor.

The election was conducted by the North Carolina General Assembly in joint session. Caswell was elected unanimously on the first ballot.

== Bibliography ==
- Clark, Walter, ed. (1895). The State Records of North Carolina. Vol. 12, 1777–78. Winston, NC.
- Mobley, Joe A. (2016). North Carolina Governor Richard Caswell: Founding Father and Revolutionary Hero. Charleston, SC: History Press.
- Smith, Penelope Sue (1980). Creation of an American State: Politics in North Carolina, 1765–1789 (PhD thesis). Houston: Rice University.
