= James Bonner =

James Bonner is the name of:

- Jimmy Bonner (1906–1963), African-American baseball player who played in Japan
- James Bonner (Patriot) (1719–1782), active in the American Revolutionary War
- James E. Bonner (general), United States Army general
- James F. Bonner (1910–1996), American molecular biologist
- James Bonner (reality television) (c. 1988–2018), featured on My 600-lb Life
