= New Bern District Brigade =

- Active: 1776–1783
- Allegiance: (United States) North Carolina
- Branch: North Carolina militia
- Type: Militia

Commanders
- Notable commanders: Brigadier Generals: 1. Richard Caswell; 2. William Bryan; 3. William Caswell; 4. John Simpson (Pro Tempore); 5. James Armstrong (Pro Tempore); 6. John Bryan

The New Bern District Brigade was an administrative division of the North Carolina militia during the American Revolutionary War (1776–1783). This unit was established by the North Carolina Provincial Congress on May 4, 1776, and disbanded at the end of the war.

== Commanders ==
- Brigadier General Richard Caswell (1775–1777)
- Brigadier General William Bryan (1777–1779)
- Brigadier General William Caswell (1779–1783)
- Brigadier General John Simpson (Pro Tempore) (August 1780)
- Brigadier General James Armstrong (Pro Tempore) (2/7/1781 to 2/10/1781)
- Brigadier General John Bryan (1782)

Lieutenant Colonel Richard Dobbs Spaight from the Craven County Regiment served as an aide to general William Caswell.

== Regiments ==
The following regiments were included in the New Bern District Brigade, which was subordinate to the North Carolina Militia and State Troops, Major General Ashe, beginning in 1778. Each regiment contained companies of up to 50 men.

Unit	Subordinate Brigade	Created	Disbanded	Original Commander, Rank
North Carolina Militia and State Troops	Governor	1778	1783	Ashe, John Sr., M.G.
New Bern District Brigade	North Carolina Militia	1776	1783	Caswell, Richard, B.G.
Beaufort County Regiment	New Bern	1775	1783	Bonner, James, Col
Carteret County Regiment	New Bern	1775	1783	Thompson, William, Col
Craven County Regiment	New Bern	1775	1783	Leech, Joseph, Col
Dobbs County Regiment	New Bern	1775	1783	Sheppard, Abraham, Sr
Hyde County Regiment	New Bern	1775	1783	Latham, Rotheas, Col
Johnston County Regiment	New Bern	1775	1783	Bryan, Needham, Col
Jones County Regiment	New Bern	1779	1783	Bryan, John, Col
Pitt County Regiment	New Bern	1775	1783	Simpson, John, Col
Wayne County Regiment	New Bern	1779	1783	Exum, Benjamin, Col

=== Beaufort County Regiment ===
The existing Beaufort County regiment was authorized as part of the North Carolina militia on September 9, 1775 by the North Carolina Provincial Congress, along with 34 other existing county regiments. Beaufort County had a small population and difficulties raising a militia. This regiment was involved in the Battle of Brier Creek in Georgia on Marcy 3, 1779 and the Battle of Rockfish Creek on August 2, 1781 in North Carolina. The commanders of this regiment were:

- Colonel James Bonner (1775–1778)
- Colonel Thomas Bonner, Jr. (1778–1779), also a Lieutenant Colonel
- Colonel William Brown (1779–1783), also a 2nd Major

=== Craven County Regiment ===
The Craven County Regiment was one of the 35 existing county militias to be authorized as a regiment of the North Carolina militia by the North Carolina Provincial Congress on September 9, 1775. It was active until the end of the war. The colonels included:

- Colonel Joseph Leech (1775)
- Colonel John Bryan, Sr. (1775–1779)
- Colonel Christopher Neale (1776–1778)
- Colonel John Sitgreaves (1779–1783)
- Colonel John Tilman (1778–1783), 2nd colonel

The Craven County regiment participated in 10 known engagements during the American Revolution:

- February 27, 1776, Battle of Moore's Creek Bridge in North Carolina
- March 3, 1779, Battle of Brier Creek in Georgia
- June 20, 1779, Battle of Stono Ferry in South Carolina
- March 28 to May 12, 1780, Siege of Charleston in South Carolina, 1780
- August 11, 1780, Little Lynches Creek in South Carolina
- August 16, 1780, Battle of Camden Court House in South Carolina
- April 25, 1781, Hobkirk's Hill in South Carolina
- July 8, 1781, New Bern in North Carolina
- August 2, 1781, Rockfish Creek in North Carolina
- April 4–17, 1782, Battle of Beaufort in North Carolina

=== Johnston County Regiment ===
The Johnston County Regiment was one of the 35 existing county militias to be authorized as a regiment of the North Carolina militia by the North Carolina Provincial Congress on September 9, 1775. It was active until the end of the war. The colonels included:

- Colonel Needham Bryan (1775–1776)
- Colonel William Bryan (1776–1777, 1781)
- Colonel Joseph Boon, Jr. (1777–1778)
- Colonel John Smith (1779–1783)

The Johnston County Regiment participated in 13 known battles and skirmishes in North Carolina, South Carolina and Georgia during the American Revolution:

- February 27, 1776, Battle of Moore's Creek Bridge in North Carolina
- March 3, 1779, Battle of Briar/Brier Creek in Georgia
- June 20, 1779, Battle of Stono Ferry in South Carolina
- March 28 to May 12, 1780, Siege of Charleston 1780 in South Carolina
- August 18, 1780, Battle of Fishing Creek in South Carolina
- February 1, 1781, Battle of Cowan's Ford
- March 15, 1781, New Garden Meeting House in North Carolina
- March 15, 1781, Battle of Guilford Court House
- April 25, 1781, Hobkirk's Hill in South Carolina
- August 2, 1781, Rockfish Creek in North Carolina
- August 17, 1781, Webber's Bridge in North Carolina
- September 13, 1781, Battle of Lindley's Mill in North Carolina
- September 1781, Brown Marsh in North Carolina

=== Jones County Regiment ===
The North Carolina General Assembly created the Jones County Regiment when it created Jones County out of the southern part of Craven County on January 30, 1779. This regiment was active until the end of the war in 1783.

The officers of the Jones County Regiment were appointed by the Governor of North Carolina. The commanders included:

- Colonel John Bryan (1779–1783)
- Colonel Nathaniel "Nathan" Bryan (2nd colonel, 1779)
- Colonel Waightstill Avery (1779–1780)
- Colonel Francis Avery (1781–1783)

The Jones County regiment was engaged in the following five known battles and skirmishes:

- March 28 to May 12, 1780, Siege of Charleston 1780 in South Carolina
- August 16, 1780, Battle of Camden Court House in South Carolina
- March 15, 1781, Battle of Guilford Court House in North Carolina
- August 2, 1781, Rockfish Creek in North Carolina
- August 17, 1781, Jumping Run in North Carolina

=== Pitt County Regiment ===
The Pitt County Regiment was one of the 35 existing county militias to be authorized as a regiment of the North Carolina militia by the North Carolina Provincial Congress on September 9, 1775. It was active until the end of the war. The colonels of this regiment included:

- Colonel John Simpson (1775–1783, commander), (August 1780, Brigadier General Pro Tempore of the New Bern District Brigade)
- Colonel John Salter (1780–1781, second colonel), (1776–1780, captain), (1781, captain in the 1st Battalion of Militia)
- Colonel James Gorham (1776–1780, major), (1780–1781, Lieutenant Colonel), (1781–1783, 2nd colonel)

The Pitt County Regiment was engaged in the nine known battles and skirmishes:

- February 27, 1776, Battle of Moore's Creek Bridge in North Carolina
- March 3, 1779, Battle of Brier/Briar Creek in Georgia
- June 20, 1779, Battle of Stono Ferry in South Carolina
- March 28 to May 12, 1780, Siege of Charleston 1780 in South Carolina
- August 11, 1780, Little Lynches Creek in South Carolina
- August 16, 1780, Battle of Camden Court House in South Carolina
- May 6, 1781, Peacock's Bridge in North Carolina
- August 17, 1781, Webber's Bridge in North Carolina
- August 21, 1781, Kingston #2 in North Carolina

== Bibliography ==
- Holloman, Charles R. (1979). "William Caswell". NCPedia.
- Holloman, Charles R. (1979). "Richard Caswell". NCPedia.
- Smith, Claiborne T. Jr. (1986). "Benjamin Exum". NCPedia.
