= Benjamin Exum =

American colonial soldier and politician

- Born: Isle of Wight County, Virginia
- Died: Wayne County, North Carolina
- Military career
- Allegiance: United States of America
- Branch: North Carolina militia
- Service years: 1775-1780
- Rank: Colonel
- Units: New Bern District Minutemen, Dobbs County Regiment
- Commands: Wayne County Regiment, 2nd North Carolina Regiment of militia
- Conflicts: Battle of Camden, Battle of Moore's Creek Bridge

Benjamin Exum (1725 or 1745–1789) was an officer in the North Carolina militia during the American Revolution and a Senator in the North Carolina General Assembly from Dobbs County.

== Early life ==
Benjamin Exum was the son of John and Elizabeth Kinchen Exum. He was born in either 1725 in Isle of Wight County, Virginia or 1745 in Southampton County, Virginia. Benjamin and his father moved to Edgecombe County, North Carolina in 1750 and later Dobbs County, North Carolina. The property that Benjamin owned was in Dobbs County until it became part of Wayne County, North Carolina in 1779.

== Career ==
In 1776, he was on a committee to extract sulphur for ammunition in the war effort of the Patriots. He represented Dobbs County in the Provincial Congress at Halifax in November 1776. He was a member of the State Senate in 1777, 1778, and 1779. His son, Benjamin Exum Jr. was probably Clerk of the House of Commons in 1777. He was elected treasurer of New Bern District in 1779 and 1784.

=== Revolutionary War service ===
Benjamin was commissioned a Lieutenant on September 28, 1775 in the New Bern District Minutemen, where he served unil April 10, 1776 when the unit was disbanded. He fought in the Battle of Moore's Creek Bridge on February 27, 1776.

He joined the Dobbs County Regiment of the North Carolina militia and was promoted to Captain in March 1776. In April 1776, he was promoted to Colonel in this unit. He was the second colonel in this unit that was at the time led by Colonel Abraham Sheppard. When Colonel Sheppard left to command the 10th North Carolina Regiment, Benjamin assumed the command of the Dobbs County Regiment.

When the North Carolina General Assembly created the Wayne County, North Carolina on November 2, 1779, they subsequently created the Wayne County Regiment of the North Carolina militia and commissioned Benjamin Exum as the colonel and commander of the unit until the end of the war with one exception. The North Carolina General Assembly created two special regiments of militia after the capture of Charleston, South Carolina. Benjamin was given the command of the 2nd North Carolina Regiment and led them at the Battle of Camden on August 16, 1780. After the defeat at Camden, he returned to Wayne County and led the Wayne County Regiment until the end of the war.

== Death and family ==
He died before 1790. Benjamin and his wife, Martha Kinchen Exum, were the parents of three sons, Benjamin Exum Jr, William Exum, and Mathew Exum, and two daughters, Martha Exum and Tabitha Exum. Tabitha married Benjamin Smith of Wayne County.
