= 8th North Carolina Regiment =

- Active: November 26, 1776-June 1, 1778
- Allegiance: (United States) Continental Congress
- Type: Infantry
- Size: 8 companies
- Part of: North Carolina Line
- Engagements: Battle of Brandywine (1777); Battle of Germantown (1777); Battle of Monmouth (June 28, 1778); Philadelphia campaign (1778)

Commanders
- Notable commanders: Colonel James Armstrong

The 8th North Carolina Regiment was authorized on November 26, 1776, and assigned to the Southern Department of the Continental Army. The 8th North Carolina Regiment played a crucial role in the Defense of Philadelphia during the Philadelphia campaign. The unit saw action at the Battle of Brandywine, Battle of Germantown and the Battle of Monmouth during the Defense of Philadelphia of the American Revolution. A part of the continental army, the Regiment was commanded by Colonel James Armstrong. The regiment was disbanded on 1 June 1778 at Valley Forge, Pennsylvania.

== Officers ==
Known officers of the 8th North Carolina Regiment of the Continental Army include the following

Commander	Lt Colonels	Lieutenants	Majors	Regimental Adjutants	Quartermasters
Col. James Armstrong	James Ingram; Samuel Lockhart; Levi Dawson	John Council Bush	Selby Harney; Pinketham Eaton	John Burton	Francis Graves; Peter Rhein

== History ==
The 8th North Carolina Regiment of the Continental Army was organized in the Spring and Summer of 1777 at Halifax, North Carolina. It included eight companies from New Bern and Wilmington Districts of North Carolina. The 8th NC Regiment contributed significantly in the Revolutionary War. They marched poorly clothed and mostly barefoot nearly 500 miles to Philadelphia area. Most of the men from the 8th NC were killed or wounded storming the Crew of "Stone House" in the Battle of Germantown on 4 Oct 1777.[3] This battle served as a turning point for the Americans. Although Gen George Washington narrowly lost this battle, the casualties were so nearly equal (American 650, British 550) that world admiration caused France to join the war as an American ally. Upon the death of Brigadier General Francis Nash as a result of his severe wounds at the Battle of Germantown, the 8th NC Regiment, along with all other NC Continental regiments in the Northern Theater, was placed under the command of Major General Alexander McDougall of New York. On December 20, 1777, the NC Continental Line was placed under Brigadier General Lachlan McIntosh of Georgia, and they were encamped at Valley Forge in Pennsylvania for that brutal winter.[4]

At Valley Forge the field officers were Colonel James Armstrong, Lieutenant Colonel Levi Dawson, and Major Pinketham Eaton.[5] Some of the known company commanders at Valley Forge were Captain Francis Tartanson, Captain John Walsh, Captain Joseph Rhodes, Captain Michael Quinn, Captain Henry Pope and Captain William Dennis Jr (William Dennis Sr. 1720-1800 was a 2nd Major in the Carteret County Militia, many confuse the father and son).

Primary Engagements:

- 9/11/1777, Battle of Brandywine Creek (PA)
- 10/4/1777, Battle of Germantown (PA)
- 1777-1778, Philadelphia campaign (PA)
