= Pinketham Eaton =

Pinketham "Pink" Eaton of North Carolina was an American officer in the Continental Army during the American Revolutionary War. He was the uncle of John H. Eaton, who served as a United States senator from Tennessee and Secretary of War.

Eaton served in the Halifax District Minutemen in 1775-1776 and on April 16, 1776, was commissioned a captain in the 3rd North Carolina Regiment. On November 22, 1777, he was promoted to major and transferred to the 8th North Carolina Regiment. After the 8th's disbandment on June 1, 1778, he was transferred to the 4th North Carolina Regiment commanding the "Major's Company."

On March 3, 1779, Eaton was wounded in the American defeat at the Battle of Brier Creek in eastern Georgia, but was able to serve in the Battle of Stono Ferry on June 20, 1779.

Eaton served as General Jethro Sumner's most active assistant in recruiting new troops, and was the first officer assigned to active service in the campaign of 1781.

On May 24, 1781, Eaton was killed in action during the successful American assault and capture of Fort Grierson near Augusta, Georgia. According to Landrum, "the American loss was small, only a few killed and wounded, but among the former was a life valuable to the American cause. This was Major Pinketham Eaton of North Carolina. He had only been a few weeks with the light corps and fell gallantly at the head of his battalion in the moment of victory."

Eaton was considered by his fellow soldiers to be a skillful and courageous soldier and was well liked due to his good temper.
