= Willoughby Williams =

American politician

- Died: June 6, 1802; Rutledge, Tennessee, U.S.
- Occupation: Politician
- Spouse: Nancy Glasgow
- Children: 6, including Willoughby Williams Jr.
- Relatives: James Glasgow (father-in-law)

Willoughby Williams was an American war veteran and politician from North Carolina.

== Early life ==
Williams was born in the 18th century.

== Career ==
Williams enlisted in 1776 and fought in the American Revolutionary War as a regimental commissionary officer. He served in the Battle of Cowpens of January 17, 1781. In 1790, he was elected to the North Carolina House of Representatives.

== Personal life ==
On January 1, 1786, Williams married Nancy Glasgow (1771-1857), daughter of James Glasgow (1735-1819) who served as North Carolina Secretary of State from 1777 to 1798. They had six children. Their son Willoughby Williams Jr. (1798-1882) went on to live in Woodlawn, a National Register of Historic Places-listed mansion in Nashville.

Williams lived in Dobbs County, North Carolina.

== Death ==
Williams died on June 6, 1802, in Rutledge, Tennessee, on his way to Davidson County, Tennessee. In 1806, his widow married Joseph McMinn, who served as Governor of Tennessee from 1815 to 1821.
