= Woodlawn (Nashville, Tennessee) =

Historic house in Tennessee, United States

- U.S. National Register of Historic Places
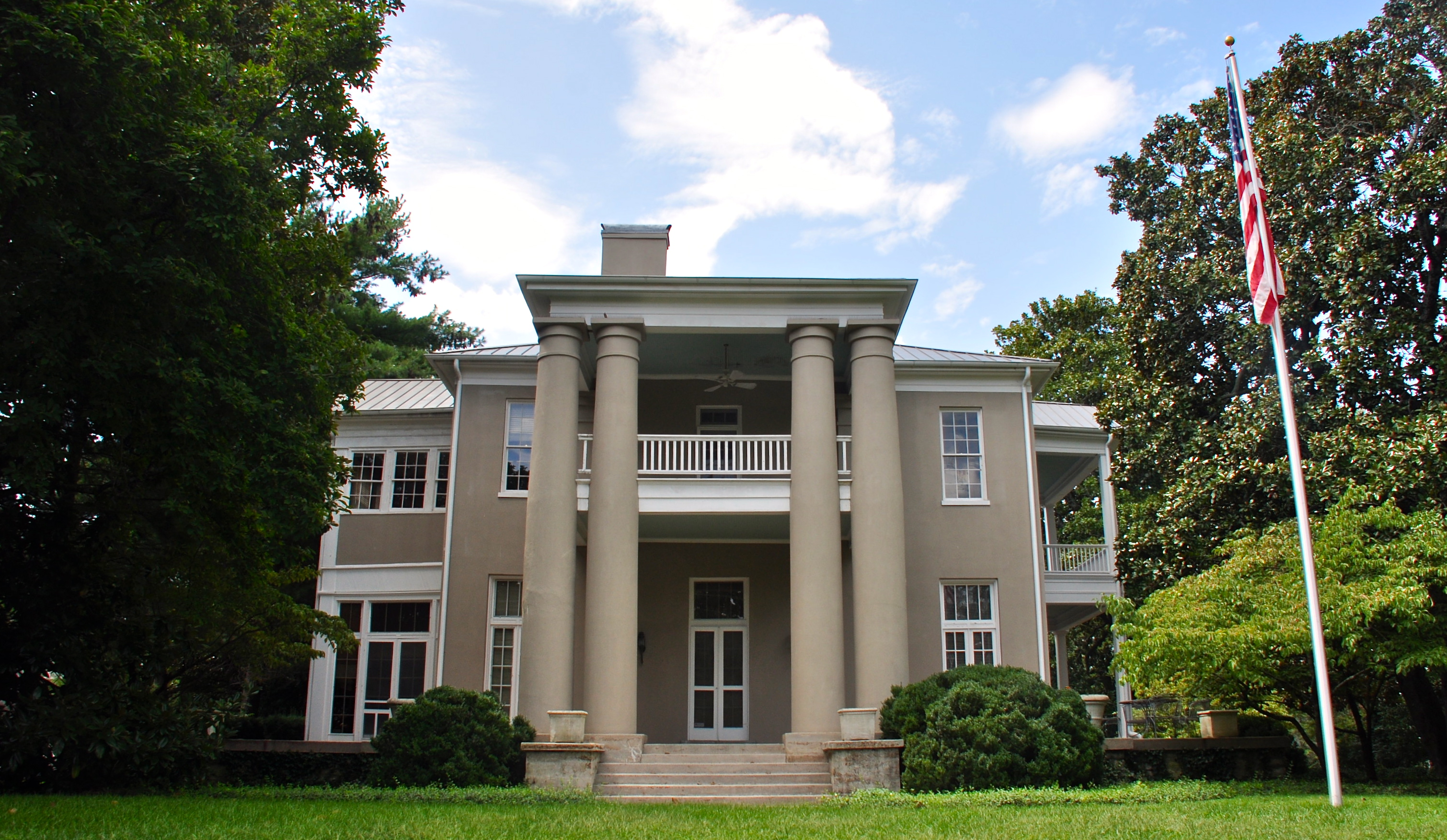
- Woodlawn, September 2014

- Location within Tennessee Location within the United States
- Location: 127 Woodmont Boulevard, Nashville, Tennessee
- Coordinates: 36°07′19″N 86°50′43″W
- Built: 1822
- Architectural style: English Regency
- NRHP reference No.: 78002584
- Added to NRHP: November 21, 1978

Woodlawn is a historic house in Nashville, Tennessee, United States.

== History ==
It was built in 1822 for John Nichols. It is an English regency style home reminiscent of Middleton Place near Charleston, South Carolina. After Nichols's daughter Nancy (1808–1844) married Willoughby Williams Jr. (1798–1882), son of Willoughby Williams and President of the Bank of Tennessee, it became their home. It is believed that Willoughby Williams Jr. hosted occasional gatherings at Woodlawn with his friends Sam Houston and Andy Jackson. By the 1850s, they moved to their property in Arkansas and their son John Henry Williams, his wife Elizabeth, his young grandson, as well as his youngest son Andrew, moved into the house. Andrew was killed during the American Civil War of 1861–1865, and the house was ransacked during the Battle of Nashville on December 15–16, 1864.

In 1900, the house was sold to Duncan Kenner. He sold it to Henry B. Richardson in 1916. That year, the eastern wing and pavilion were destroyed to build Woodmont Boulevard, and architect Hugh Roland redesigned it. The Young and Moore families subsequently lived in it until about 1981. Later, in an effort to save the historic property, two young Nashville entrepreneurs (Jim Chandler and Gary Ganick) obtained a zoning change for the property. Then, condominiums were built on the south lawns and the house was converted into an office.

It was listed on the National Register of Historic Places on November 21, 1978.

== Bibliography ==
- Samuel D. Smith, Woodlawn Mansion, Nashville, Tennessee: History, Architecture and Archaeology, Northern Telecom, 1985, 130 pages.
