= White-Holman House =

Historic house in North Carolina, United States

- U.S. National Register of Historic Places
- U.S. Historic district – Contributing property
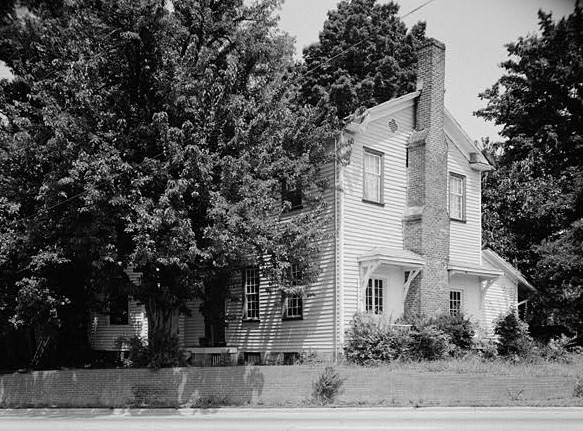
- White-Holman House, HABS Photo, July 1984

- Location within North Carolina Location within the United States
- Location: New Bern Ave., Raleigh, North Carolina
- Coordinates: 35°46′46″N 78°38′11″W
- Area: 0.5 acres (0.20 ha)
- Built: 1798
- NRHP reference No.: 71000627
- Added to NRHP: April 16, 1971

White-Holman House is a historic home located at Raleigh, Wake County, North Carolina. It was built about 1798, and is a two-story, three-bay, frame dwelling with a two-story wing and one-story rear shed addition. It is sheathed in weatherboard and has a side-hall plan. It was built by William White (1762–1811), North Carolina Secretary of State, 1798–1811. The house was moved to its present location in April 1986.

It was listed on the National Register of Historic Places in 1971. It is located in the Capitol Area Historic District.
