= Sarah Heritage Caswell =

First Lady of North Carolina (1776–1780 and 1785–1787)

First Lady of North Carolina
- In office November 12, 1776 – April 20, 1780
- Governor: Richard Caswell
- Preceded by: Elizabeth Martin Martin (Colonial first lady)
- Succeeded by: Mary Whiting Jones Nash
- In office May 13, 1785 – December 20, 1787
- Governor: Richard Caswell
- Preceded by: vacant
- Succeeded by: Frances Cathcart Johnston

Personal details
- Born: Sarah Heritage; 1740
- Died: 1794 (aged 53–54) Kinston, North Carolina, U.S.
- Spouse: Richard Caswell (m. 1758)
- Children: 8

Sarah Heritage Caswell (1740–1794) was the first and fifth First Lady of the State North Carolina, as the wife of Governor Richard Caswell, from 1776 to 1780 and from 1785 to 1787.

== Biography ==
Caswell was born Sarah Heritage in 1740 to Susannah Moore Heritage and William Heritage, a lawyer.

She married the widowed lawyer Richard Caswell, who studied law under her father, on June 20, 1758. They had eight children: Richard Caswell, born in 1759; Sarah Caswell, born in 1762; Winston Caswell, born in 1764; Anna Caswell, born in 1766; Dallam Caswell, born in 1769; John Caswell, born in 1772; Susannah Caswell, born in 1775, and Christian Caswell, born in 1779. She was the stepmother of Caswell's two surviving children from his first marriage to Mary Mackilwean, including William Caswell.

Caswell was the first North Carolinian first lady after the American Revolution, during her husband's first term as governor from 1776 to 1780. She served a second time as the state's first lady from 1785 to 1787.

She died at Newington-on-the-Hill in 1794.
