= Abraham Sheppard =

American politician

- Born: c. 1730 possibly Surry County, Virginia
- Died: c. 1790; Dobbs County, North Carolina
- Children: John, Abraham Jr, Phoebe Sheppard
- Military career
- Allegiance: United States of America
- Branch: North Carolina militia, North Carolina Line
- Service years: 1775–1778
- Rank: Colonel
- Commands: Dobbs County Regiment, 1st Battalion of Volunteers, 10th North Carolina Regiment
- Conflicts: Battle of Moore's Creek Bridge, Battle of Brandywine Creek, Battle of Germantown

Abraham Sheppard was a merchant-planter, sheriff, legislator, and officer during the American Revolutionary War from North Carolina. He lived in Dobbs County, North Carolina on a plantation called Contentnea.

== Civilian career ==
Abraham's ancestors were from Surry County, Virginia, where he may have been born. The date of his birth is not known for sure but could be about 1730. Abraham Sheppard was a merchant-planter and owned a plantation, Contentnea, in Dobbs County, North Carolina. He had at least three sons (Benjamin, Abraham Jr., and John), and four daughters, one of whom (Pherebe or Phoebe Sheppard) married Colonel James Glasgow, a fellow colonel in the North Carolina militia. Abraham became a widower with three small daughters by his first wife and married the sister of James Glasgow, Martha Jones Glasgow. They had a large family. Abraham died in or after 1790.

His civilian career included the following offices:

- 1759, appointed as justice of the peace for Dobbs County, North Carolina
- 1760 and 1769 served in the Province of North Carolina Assembly
- 1775, 1776, served in Third, Fourth, and Fifth North Carolina Provincial Congress
- 1780-1781, served in the North Carolina House of Commons
- 1784, served as member of the North Carolina Council of State
- 1783 to 1790, served as chairman of the Court of Pleas and Quarter Sessions for Dobbs County

== Military service ==
Sheppard served during the American Revolution:

- September 9, 1775, promoted to Colonel in the North Carolina Militia.
- November 23, 1776, Colonel and Commandant of the newly created 1st Battalion of Volunteers, which was disbanded on April 10, 1777.
- April 17, 1777, Colonel and Commandant of the 10th North Carolina Regiment
- 1777-1778, Dobbs County Regiment
- June 1, 1778, retired from military service

His son, John Sheppard, served with him as a Captain, Major and Lieutenant Colonel in the Dobbs County regiment and as Major in the 10th North Carolina Regiment. He was given the command as colonel of the Wayne County Regiment established in 1779. His son Abraham Sheppard Jr. also served with him in the 10th North Carolina Regiment as a Captain.

== Bibliography ==
- Fred A. Berg, Encyclopedia of Continental Army Units (1972)
- John L. Cheney Jr., ed., North Carolina Government, 1585–1974 (1975).
- Walter Clark, ed., State Records of North Carolina, vols. 11–13, 16, 22 (1896–1907).
- Talmage Johnson and Charles R. Holloman, The Story of Kinston and Lenoir County (1954).
- Military Collections (North Carolina State Archives, Raleigh).
- Hugh F. Rankin, North Carolina Continentals (1971).
- Phillips Russell, North Carolina in the Revolutionary War (1965).
- William L. Saunders, ed., Colonial Records of North Carolina, vols. 8–10 (1890).
