= Willoughby Aston =

Willoughby Aston may refer to:

- Sir Willoughby Aston, 2nd Baronet (1640–1702) of the Aston Baronets, High Sheriff of Cheshire
- Sir Willoughby Aston, 5th Baronet (c. 1715–1772) of the Aston Baronets, MP for Nottingham
- Sir Willoughby Aston, 6th Baronet (c. 1748–1815) of the Aston Baronets
