= Jane Farwell =

American dancer

- Born: January 18, 1916; Ridgeway, Wisconsin, U.S.
- Died: April 6, 1993 (aged 77)
- Education: Antioch College
- Occupations: Folk dance and recreation leader
- Spouse: Jergen Hinrichs
- Children: Mr. and Mrs. Roy Farwell

Jane Farwell (January 18, 1916 – April 6, 1993) was an American folk dancer and recreation leader. She specialized in Scandinavian dancing.

== Early life and education ==
The daughter of Mr. and Mrs. Roy Farwell, she was born on her family farm near Ridgeway, Wisconsin. After graduating from Central High School in Madison, Wisconsin, she created a major in "rural community leadership" and graduated with honors in 1938 from Antioch College in Yellow Springs, Ohio.

== Career ==
In 1938, she was a physical education instructor at a high school in Wellsboro, Pennsylvania. Soon thereafter, she became an extension recreation specialist in West Virginia, working with Oglebay Park's Oglebay Institute. She took a four-month leave of absence from that position in 1943 in order to become program director of a new United Service Organizations club in Tucson, Arizona.

Deciding that folk dancing was going to be the main thrust of her recreational program, she became "the 'Johnny Appleseed' of folk dance camps", establishing the country’s first folk dance camps, including those in Ohio, New York, Maryland, Pennsylvania, and West Virginia. She is credited as one of the founders of the modern folk dance movement, whose enthusiasts in the United States came to number in the thousands.

In 1955, Farwell married Jergen Hinrichs, a young farmer from Germany, who was doing an internship on her father’s Ridgeway farm. The couple moved to Germany where she lived in Ostfriesland for 11 years. Throughout Germany, and in Switzerland, Scandinavia, the Netherlands, and Turkey, she continued to teach folk dancing and to study European folklore. In 1956, Jane was invited to tour Japan together with four other well-known folk dance leaders.

In 1966, Farwell returned to Wisconsin, and purchased the old Wakefield School near Ridgeway, on an acre of land which her grandfather had donated to the county back in the early 1880s. There she created and directed Folklore Village — the culmination of her ideas about festivals, folklore, dance, recreation, community, and the land.

In 1988, Farwell and her Folklore Village community realized their dream of building a larger space to house the cultural activities expressed through dance, music, craft, and foodways traditions—Farwell Hall, a large barn-like structure that contains an acclaimed dance floor, a certified kitchen, classrooms, a gallery, and office space.

== Death ==
On April 6, 1993, Farwell died of complications of cancer at age 77. She deeded her family farm—lands and buildings— to Folklore Village, where her work to promote opportunities for individuals and communities to honor, experience, and support ethnic and traditional folklife continues to this day.

== Legacy ==
Festivals are the heart of Folklore Village. From 1947 (when she began the Christmas Festival) to 1966, Farwell directed her original Festival of Christmas and Midwinter Traditions in Mount Horeb, Wisconsin, in order to combat the growing commercialization of Christmas and the ignorance of increasing numbers of young people about the diverse pageantry, foods, and music of Christmas. Folklore Village continues to present some of Jane’s original festivals, as well as others that have grown organically from their diverse community base. In 2016, Folklore Village presented six festivals – a Spring Scandinavian Music and Dance Weekend, an English Country Dance & Music Weekend, a Cajun Music and Dance Weekend, a Fall Swedish Music and Dance Weekend, the 69th Festival of Christmas and Midwinter Traditions, and their newest festival – Sustainability Weekend. All embody Farwell’s original vision of a place where people can come to dance, sing, play music, eat, and live folk customs from the world over.

In 2016, Folklore Village celebrated Farwell’s centennial, recognized by the joint state legislature and Governor Scott Walker; and marked by special events, a reunion weekend, and the publication of the Folklore Village Cookbook.

== Publications ==
- Folk Dances for Fun
- Folk Dancing for Fun
- My Heart Sings
