= Abraham Jones (North Carolina politician) =

American politician

Abraham Jones (c. 1739 – after 1787) was a politician in North Carolina, in the North Carolina General Assembly of 1778 and a colonel over the Hyde County Regiment of the North Carolina militia from 1779 to 1783.

== Military service ==
Jones was appointed colonel of the Hyde County Regiment in 1779. He served alongside Colonel William Russel until the end of the Revolutionary War in 1783. Jones was elected to represent Hyde County in the North Carolina House of Commons in 1778 and 1779. He served in the North Carolina Senate in 1782 and 1784 to 1787.
