= Harmony Hall (Kinston, North Carolina) =

United States national historic site

- Peebles House
- U.S. National Register of Historic Places
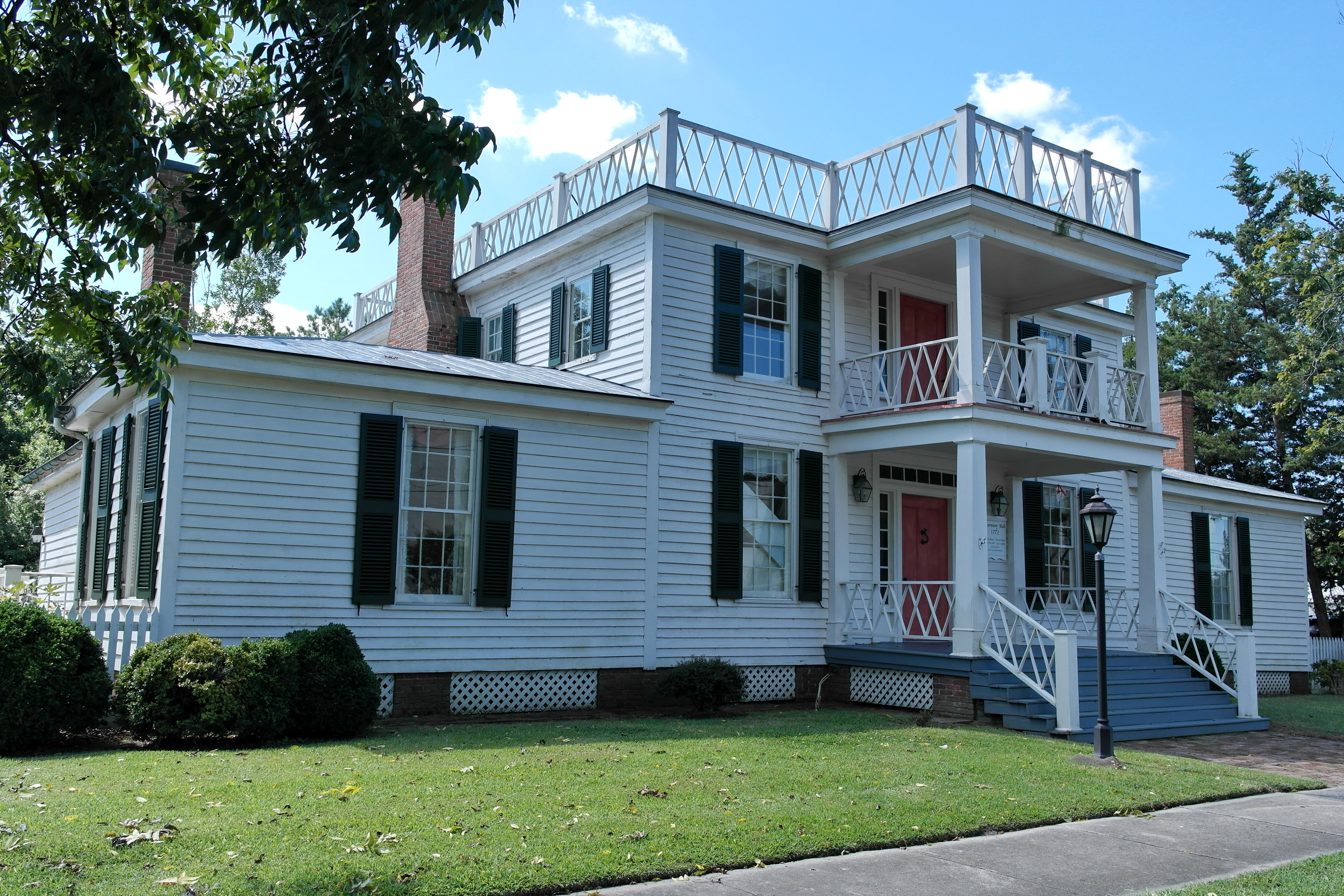
- Harmony Hall, 2013

- Location within North Carolina Location within the United States
- Location: 109 E. King Street; Kinston, North Carolina, U.S.
- Coordinates: 35°15′33″N 77°34′59″W
- Area: 0.5 acres (0.20 ha)
- Built: 1772
- Architectural style: Greek Revival, Georgian, Federal
- NRHP reference No.: 71000603
- Added to NRHP: August 26, 1971

Harmony Hall, also known as the Peebles House, is a historic building located at 109 East King Street in Kinston, North Carolina, United States. The 18th-century house, the oldest building in Kinston, was owned by North Carolina's first elected governor. The house briefly served as the de facto state capitol during the Revolutionary War. The building has been expanded and renovated throughout its history, transitioning from the Georgian and Federal styles to Greek Revival. One of the prominent features of the house is the two-story porch on the facade. Harmony Hall was added to the National Register of Historic Places (NRHP) in 1971 and serves as a house museum operated by the Lenoir County Historical Association.

== History ==
Harmony Hall was built on land Elizabeth Herritage inherited from her father, William Herritage. William had convinced the North Carolina Colonial Assembly to locate the new town of Kingston (named after King George III; renamed Kinston after the Revolutionary War) on his land. Elizabeth and her husband, Captain Jesse Cobb, began building their home in 1772 when they were married, and by 1776, construction of the house was complete. That same year, Cobb left to fight in the Battle of Moore's Creek Bridge near Wilmington. By the time he returned home, Elizabeth had given birth to their son, John. Later that year Cobb left again to fight in the war, serving in the Continental Army with General George Washington during the New York and New Jersey campaign and winter at Valley Forge.

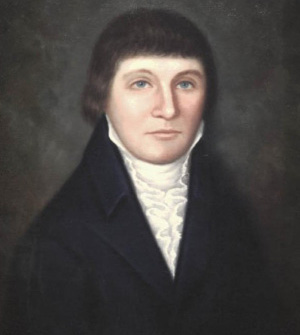
Governor Richard Caswell was an owner of Harmony Hall.

During the war, the seat of North Carolina's government, New Bern, was vulnerable to attacks by the Royal Navy. The state's first governor and Elizabeth Cobb's brother-in-law, Richard Caswell, moved the state government offices further inland to Kinston to solve this problem. Caswell lived at his nearby estate, Newington, and Harmony Hall became the residence of James Glasgow, the first North Carolina Secretary of State. The house served as the de facto state capitol during the war from 1777 to 1781. Much of the state records were stored in the home while meetings of the State Board of War and other government groups also met there. Following the war, Caswell purchased the home from Jesse and Elizabeth, though he continued living at his Newington estate. In 1782, Caswell gave Harmony Hall to his second son, 24-year-old Richard Jr., who was a successful businessman at the time. During a business trip in December 1784, Richard Jr. left Charleston on a ship bound for New Bern. The ship was never heard from again and his estate was settled the following year. Richard Jr.'s younger brothers, John and Winston, lived in the home until their deaths in 1796 and around 1799, respectively. The house underwent its first extensive renovation during the 1790s. John Caswell's widow, Mary, married William Lovick sometime around 1800 and died a few years later. Lovick remarried and continued living in the home.

Harmony Hall was later owned by Jesse Cobb, Jesse and Elizabeth's grandson, city commissioner Abner Pearce, and councilman John Henry Peebles. Peebles and his wife, Harriet Cobb, Jesse and Elizabeth's granddaughter, purchased the house in 1845. Two wings had previously been added to the home around 1830 and the Peebles extensively renovated it in the Greek Revival architectural style, including lowering the roof and adding the balustrade. The Peebles were forced to flee Harmony Hall in 1862 during the Civil War and it was used as a hospital for wounded soldiers. In 1864, John reportedly killed himself in the home's upstairs bedroom because he was depressed about the ruined state of his business and property. Harriet reopened the family's store after the war and managed it until about 1897. Following her death in 1898, there were several owners of Harmony Hall until 1937, when it became home to the Kinston Woman's Club. On August 26, 1971, Harmony Hall was added to the NRHP. The club donated Harmony Hall and its historical furnishings to the Lenoir County Historical Association (LCHA) around 1977 and a restoration project was begun. The LCHA raised over $170,000 by 1981 while the North Carolina General Assembly approved additional funding of $50,000. Restoration of the building was completed in 1985.

Harmony Hall, the oldest building in Kinston, is still owned and maintained by the LCHA. The house, which is reportedly haunted, is open to the public Wednesday through Saturday, from 10 a.m. to 4 p.m., and may be rented for special occasions. There is also an early-20th century one-room schoolhouse located on the property that is open to the public. A historical marker in front of the house reads: "Harmony Hall - Office of Secretary of State during Revolution. Later owned by Richard Caswell & sons. Altered in nineteenth century."

== Architecture ==
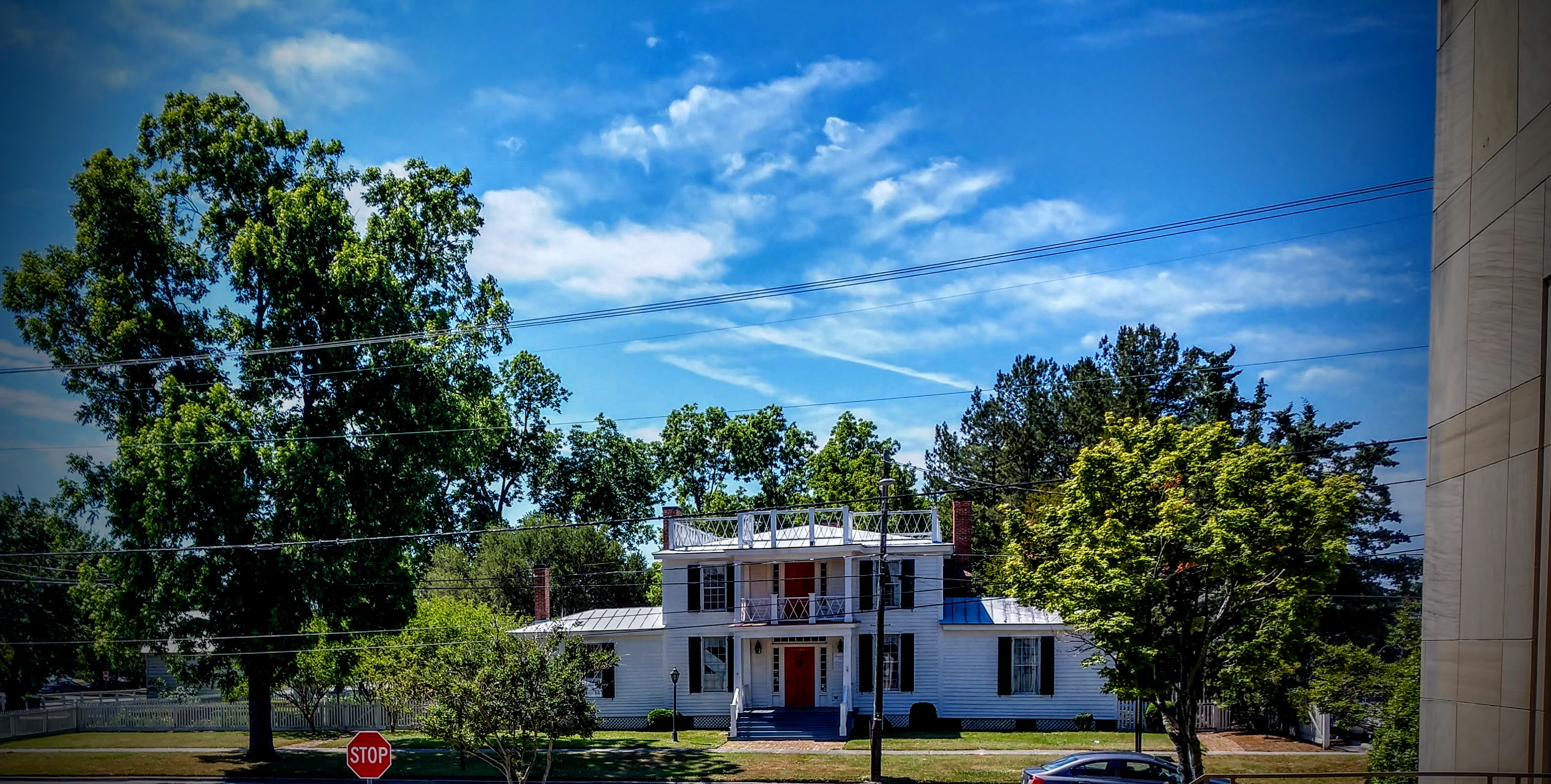
Harmony Hall, the historic landmark located at 109 E King St. Kinston NC

The Greek Revival alterations made in the 19th century removed most of the early Georgian and Federal architectural details. The two-story frame building features single story wings on the east and west sides, a brick foundation, and low pyramidal roof. The original portion of the home is three bays wide while the wings are one bay. Two wooden pillars support the two-story single-bay porch with a trellis balustrade located on the facade. The entrance features a seven-pane transom and sidelights while the second floor porch door features just the sidelights. Each side of the original portion is three bays wide and features a Flemish bond brick chimney. The east and west sides of the wings are two bays wide and each has an interior end chimney. The rear side of the building is three bays wide and includes a back entrance and common bond chimney. A small porch on the rear entrance connects the house with a frame kitchen building. The home's windows are nine-over-nine sash on the original portion's facade, nine-over-nine on the first floor of the wings, and six-over-six on the second floor of the wings.

== See also ==
- National Register of Historic Places listings in Lenoir County, North Carolina
