= Joseph McMinn =

American politician

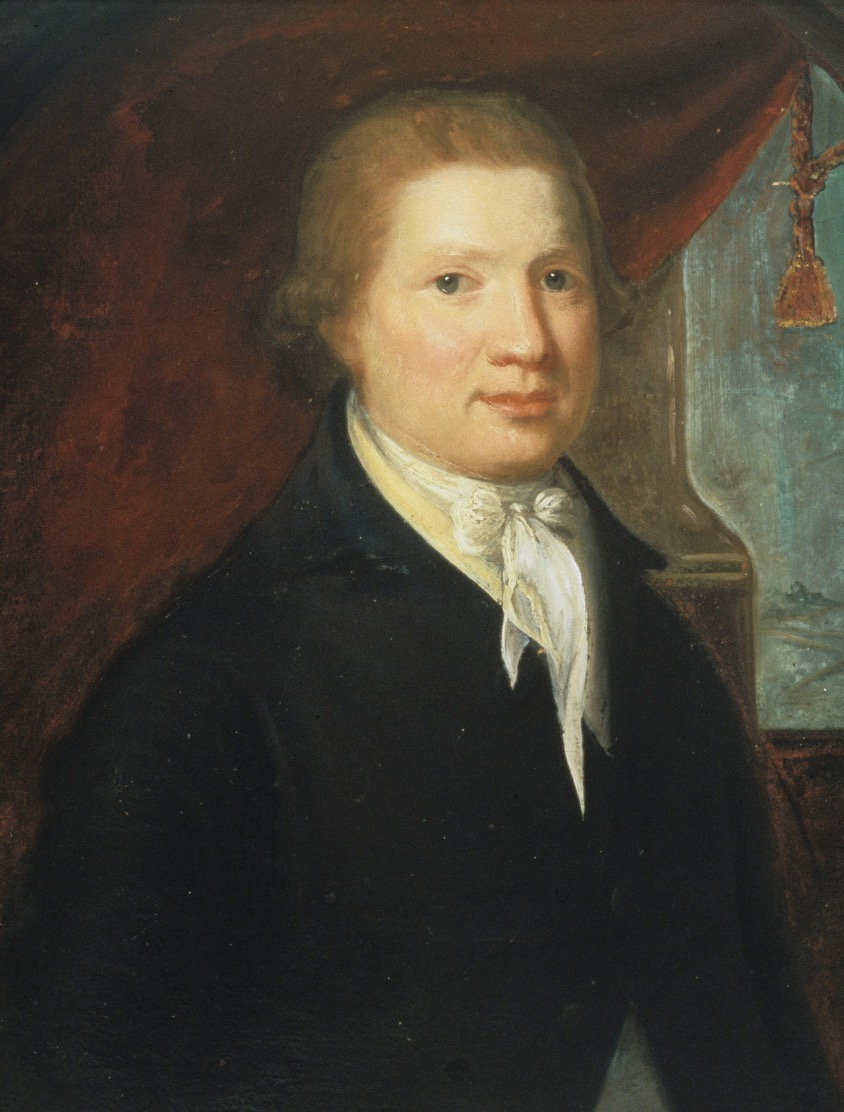
- Portrait by Rembrandt Peale, c. 1796

4th Governor of Tennessee
- In office September 27, 1815 – October 1, 1821
- Preceded by: Willie Blount
- Succeeded by: William Carroll

Speaker of the Tennessee Senate
- In office 1805–1811
- Preceded by: James White
- Succeeded by: Thomas Henderson

Personal details
- Born: June 22, 1758 West Marlborough Township, Pennsylvania
- Died: November 17, 1824 (aged 66) Calhoun, Tennessee
- Resting place: Shiloh Presbyterian Cemetery, Calhoun
- Party: Democratic-Republican
- Spouse(s): Hannah Cooper (1785–1811; her death); Rebecca Kincade (1812–1815; her death); Nancy Williams (1816–1821; separation)
- Profession: Farmer

Joseph McMinn (June 22, 1758 – October 17, 1824) was an American politician who served as the fourth governor of Tennessee from 1815 to 1821. A veteran of the American Revolution, he had previously served in the legislature of the Southwest Territory (1794–1796), and as Speaker of the Tennessee Senate (1805–1811). He was a member of the Democratic-Republican Party.

Following his term as governor, he served as an agent to the Cherokee for the United States government.

== Early life ==
McMinn was born in West Marlborough Township, Pennsylvania, and was one of ten children. He obtained only a limited rural education, and even in his later years would be described as a "rustic frontiersman." Though raised as a Quaker, he joined the Continental Army during the American Revolution.

In 1786, McMinn moved to Hawkins County, Tennessee, where he had purchased a farm. In 1792, Southwest Territory governor William Blount appointed McMinn justice of the peace for Hawkins County, and McMinn represented Hawkins County in the territorial legislature from 1794 to 1796. He also served as an officer in the territorial militia, eventually rising to the rank of brigade commander.

== Career ==
McMinn was a delegate to the 1796 constitutional convention and helped write the state constitution that came into effect when Tennessee was admitted to the Union on June 1, 1796. He was chosen to deliver a copy of the completed document to the federal government in Philadelphia. He served in the Tennessee Senate from 1797 to 1801, and from 1803 to 1811, and was Speaker of the Senate from 1805 to 1811.

In 1815, McMinn ran for governor against four other prominent state politicians: Senator Jesse Wharton, Congressman Robert Weakley, former speaker of the state house Robert Foster, and fellow state constitutional convention delegate Thomas Henderson. Though his opponents assailed him in the press, McMinn won the election with a plurality of over 15,000 of the 37,000 votes cast. He was reelected in 1817, again defeating Foster, and elected to a third term in 1819, defeating Enoch Parsons.

While governor, McMinn concentrated on peaceful relationships with Native Americans in order to ease the way for more white settlement, particularly to the west. The Chickasaw Purchase Treaty, or Western Purchase, in which most of what is now West Tennessee was acquired, was accomplished during his tenure as governor. Fourteen new counties were created. The Calhoun Treaty (or Hiwassee Purchase), in which the United States acquired a portion of southeastern Tennessee, was also negotiated during his tenure.

Following the Panic of 1819, McMinn called a joint session of the state legislature in June 1820, which voted to establish a state bank that would provide low-interest loans. This agitated many of McMinn's fellow East Tennesseans, who had for years been complaining about lack of state appropriations for internal improvements, namely navigational improvements on the upper Tennessee River. The legislature used state-owned lands from the Hiwassee Purchase to provide financial backing for the new bank.

Upon his retirement as governor due to the term limits in the 1796 constitution that he had helped to draft, he returned to his farm in Hawkins County. In 1823, he moved to a farm along the Hiwassee River near Calhoun, Tennessee, and served as an agent for the federal government at the nearby Cherokee Agency until the time of his death.

== Family life and legacy ==
McMinn married his first wife, Anna Cooper, in 1785, and they had one daughter, Jane. Following the death of his first wife in 1811, McMinn married Rebecca Kincade the next year. She died in January 1815, and his only child, Jane, died two weeks later. Jane McMinn (1787–1815) had first married Hugh Campbell, second James Taylor Gaines (1775–1821). Gaines was an older brother of Edmund Pendleton Gaines and George Strother Gaines.

In 1816, he married Nancy Glasgow Williams, the daughter of disgraced North Carolina Secretary of State James Glasgow, formerly married to Willoughby Williams, a member of the North Carolina House of Representatives. This marriage ended in a controversial separation and a failed attempt at divorce in 1821. Nancy Glasgow's sister Elizabeth was married first to Stockley Donelson, a brother-in-law of Andrew Jackson, and then to John Anderson, and then to John Martin.

In 1942, a portrait of McMinn that had been painted by noted artist Rembrandt Peale in 1796 was discovered in Philadelphia. McMinn apparently posed for the portrait during his visit to the city to deliver the newly written Tennessee state constitution to the federal government. The Tennessee Historical Society purchased the painting for the state.

McMinn County, Tennessee, and the town of McMinnville, Tennessee, in Warren County, are named in Joseph McMinn's honor. William T. Newby, the founder of McMinnville, Oregon, named the city after his hometown of McMinnville, Tennessee.

McMinn joined the Presbyterian Church late in life, and was buried in an unmarked grave at the Shiloh Presbyterian Cemetery in Calhoun. In 1880, his namesake McMinn County attempted to have his grave reinterred in its county seat of Athens, but an eccentric preacher named R. J. M. Only, who was the only person who knew the grave's location, refused to reveal the location. After the county agreed not to move the grave, Only revealed the location, and a large marker was placed upon it.

Political offices
Preceded by Willie Blount	Governor of Tennessee; 1815–1821	Succeeded by William Carroll
