= Carnell =

Carnell is an English language occupational surname for a crossbow man. It may also be used as a given name. Carnell may refer to:

== Surname ==
- Andrew Carnell (1877–1951), Canadian politician
- Arthur Carnell (1862–1940), British sport shooter
- Artie Carnell (1909–1942), Australian rugby league footballer
- Bradley Carnell (born 1977), South African football player
- Edward John Carnell (1919–1967), Christian theologian
- Geoffrey Carnell (1915–1987), Newfoundland politician
- Ian Carnell (born 1955), Australian public servant
- John Carnell (1912–1972), British editor
- Kate Carnell (born 1955), Australian politician
- Laura H. Carnell (1867–1929), American educator
- Richard S. Carnell (born 1953), American lawyer
- Samuel Carnell (1832–1920), New Zealand politician
- Stanley Carnell (1903–1989), Canadian politician

== Given name ==
- Carnell Breeding (born 1991), American musician
- Carnell Lake (born 1967), American football player and coach
- Carnell Tate (born 2005), American football player

== Places ==
- Carnell Estate, Ayrshire, Scotland
- Carnell Peak, Antarctica
