= 10th North Carolina Regiment =

- Active: 1777–1778
- Country: United States
- Allegiance: North Carolina
- Size: 728 soldiers
- Part of: North Carolina Line, Northern Department of the Continental Army
- Nickname(s): Sheppard's Additional Continental Regiment
- Engagements: Battle of Germantown, Battle of Brandywine Creek

Commanders
- Notable commanders: Colonel Abraham Sheppard

The 10th North Carolina Regiment was authorized on 17 April 1777, as a unit of the North Carolina State Troops named Sheppard's Regiment. The regiment was organized from 19 April to 1 July 1777, at Kinston, North Carolina by men from the northeastern region of the state of North Carolina and was adopted and assigned to the main Continental Army on 17 June 1777, as Sheppard's Additional Continental Regiment. The regiment was disbanded on 1 June 1778, at Valley Forge, Pennsylvania.

== History ==
Abraham Sheppard from Dobbs County, North Carolina was commissioned as the colonel and commandant over the newly authorized 10th NC Regiment on the Continental Line on 17 April 1777. This regiment never met expectations and seemed to take forever to assemble. Other known field officers included Lt. Col. Adam Perkins and Maj. John Sheppard. The regiment also included William Alford as Assistant Commissary, Ebenezer Blackley as Surgeon's Mate, Isaac Bryan as Paymaster, William Moore as Surgeon's Mate, Benjamin Sheppard as Paymaster, and Thomas Williams as Commissary.

The 10th Regiment was organized in the Summer and Fall of 1777 at Kintson, North Carolina. It included eight companies of volunteers from the northwestern part of North Carolina. It was assigned to the North Carolina Brigade, an element of the Northern Department of the Continental Army, on 8 July 1777. Two companies started marching north in August 1777. They joined the North Carolina Brigade at the Battle of Brandywine Creek on 11 September 1777, and the Battle of Germantown on 4 October 1777, in Pennsylvania. The remainder of the regiment reached Hanover County, Virginia in February 1778. This component of the regiment was reduced in size due to desertions and illness. After they reached Valley Forge in Pennsylvania, they disbanded and the remaining soldiers joined the 1st and 2nd North Carolina Regiments. On 29 May 1778, the Continental Congress ordered the reorganization of all North Carolina regiments due to low numbers in their ranks. The already defunct 10th North Carolina Regiment was officially disbanded, effective 1 June 1778, never to be resurrected.
