= James Bonner (Patriot) =

- Born: August 20, 1719; Beaufort or Hyde Precinct, Bath County, North Carolina
- Died: 1782 (aged 62–63); Washington, Beaufort County, North Carolina
- Resting place: St. Peter's Episcopal Church Cemetery, Bonner St., Washington, Beaufort County, North Carolina
- Known for: Founding Washington, North Carolina
- Title: Colonel
- Spouse: Mary Anne Snoad
- Parent(s): Thomas Bonner and Abigail Brian Daw
- Relatives: Colonel Thomas Bonner, Jr. (brother)
- Military Service
- Allegiance: North Carolina
- Branch: Militia
- Service years: 1775-1778
- Rank: Colonel
- Commands: Beaufort County Regiment
- Website: Bonner Genealogy Database

Colonel James Bonner (August 20, 1719—1782) was a Patriot from Beaufort County, North Carolina during the American Revolutionary War. He commanded the Beaufort County Regiment and also founded the town of Washington, North Carolina.

== Early life ==
His father Thomas Bonner was a landowner in Hyde Precinct in 1715. James died in Beaufort County, North Carolina in 1782 and was buried in the town of Washington, which was founded on his land. His grave was across the present "Main Street" from the present St. Peter's Episcopal Church, which was built at an earlier date, on land which he donated for "the building of a church." His remains were removed to the churchyard (southwest corner) between 1888 and 1893.

== Career ==
Bonner founded the town of Washington, North Carolina. He donated land for public buildings, streets, and a church. Bonner, his brother Major Henry Bonner and their brother-in-law Colonel Edward Salter were three Commissioners appointed by the Colonial Assembly for founding the town. They laid off 60 lots, which were distributed by lottery. Bonner held various offices in Beaufort County. He was appointed on December 5, 1760, by the Governor and Council at Wilmington as Justice of the Peace in Beaufort County. He was appointed Colonel of the Beaufort County Regiment of the North Carolina militia on September 9, 1775. His brother, Thomas Bonner, Jr. (1719-1787), was also in this regiment and led it as colonel in 1778-1779. He (or his son James) was a member of the Constitutional Convention. He represented Beaufort County at the General Assembly in New Bern, North Carolina on December 5, 1769, and November 12, 1771.

== Family ==
James was married twice; first to Anne (or Mary) Snoad, who died before 1782. She was the daughter of Colonel John Snoad and his wife Elizabeth who came to North Carolina and settled in the Pamlico Section about 1720 and died there in 1743. James married secondly to Mary Maule. Mary was the daughter of Dr. Patrick Maule and his wife Elizabeth of Bath, North Carolina who died before June 1736.

Bonner's will was written 25 December 1782, and recorded at Beaufort County Courthouse in their Will Book OW on pages 177-178-179.

=== Children ===
- John Bonner (b. 15 Sep 1746)
- Sarah Bonner
- Samuel Bonner
- Mary Bonner
- Joseph Bonner
- Anna Bonner
- James Bonner (b. 26 Jun 1753)
- Elizabeth Bonner (b. 1 Jul 1755)
- Henry Bonner (b. Abt. 1775)
- Wilson Bonner (b. 14 Mar 1760)
