= Berengera Caswell =

Berengera Caswell (Mary Bean)
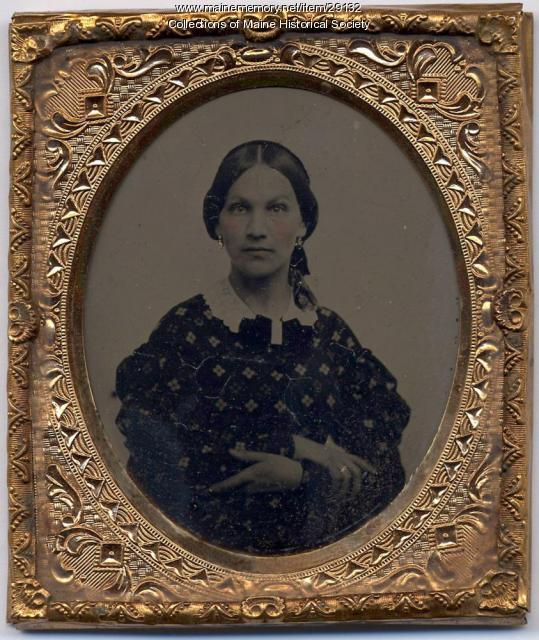
- 1849 Ambrotype thought to be of Berengera Caswell (woman with teardrop earrings)
- Born: February 17, 1828; Brompton, Quebec, Canada
- Died: December 23, 1849 (aged 21); Saco, Maine, United States
- Years active: 1847-1849
- Known for: Inspiration for the short stories Mary Bean, the Factory Girl and Life of George Hamilton

Berengera Caswell (February 17, 1828 – December 22, 1849) was a Canadian mill and factory worker who died following an abortion procedure. The subsequent murder trial, newspaper coverage and fictional accounts of her life and death generated debate on a range of issues related to women and women's lifestyles.

== Biography ==
Caswell and her two sisters, Ruth and Thais, left their hometown of Brompton, Quebec, to work in the textile mills of New England. They first went to Lowell, Massachusetts, and then Manchester, New Hampshire. While working at the Amoskeag Mill in Manchester, Caswell met William Long, a factory machinist and the pair became lovers. In September 1849 Long lost his job and moved home to Biddeford, Maine. A week after he left Manchester, Caswell left for Salem, Massachusetts. In November 1849, Caswell suspected that she was pregnant and left Salem and headed for Biddeford to find Long. She told him privately of her suspected pregnancy and they decided that abortion was their best option.

Neither Caswell nor Long knew whom to ask for an abortion, so Long turned to his boss Mr. Blake, who found Dr. James Smith, who was known as a botanical physician. Smith gave Caswell the alias name Mary Bean, and Caswell moved into Smith's house while he attempted to terminate the pregnancy. Caswell began taking abortifacients, an agent or drug that will induce an abortion. Caswell took the extracts at the end of November and again early in December, but the abortion was unsuccessful.

On December 15, 1849, when Caswell was fifteen to eighteen weeks pregnant, Smith took more drastic and dangerous measures to terminate the pregnancy. To perform the abortion, Smith inserted an eight-inch long hooked wire instrument into Caswell's vagina and into her womb while she was producing very intense contractions. Smith's plan was to puncture the amniotic sack and terminate her pregnancy. Smith was successful in aborting the fetus but during the procedure he pierced her uterus and damaged the surrounding organs, leaving a wound a quarter-inch in diameter and four inches in length. The gash quickly became infected and at the time, there were no anesthesia, antibiotics, antiseptics, or analgesics. In intense pain from the procedure, Caswell was struck with fever, chills, and spreading infection. Smith had little or nothing to offer her for her pain. A week after the abortion, as Smith knew Caswell's life was coming to an end, he left the house and slept at a nearby parlor. She died in Smith's house on December 22, 1849.

When Long went to visit Caswell, as he did every Sunday, Smith told Long that Caswell had died from typhoid. Smith approached Long again in January asking him for more money, as well as Caswell's trunk, which she had left at her boarding house before the procedure. Smith refused; in response, Smith angrily told Long that Caswell did not die from typhoid, but instead she had died in childbirth and delivered an undeveloped son.

=== Death and murder trial ===
Following Caswell's death, Smith took a wooden board from his barn and tied her corpse to it, then disposed of her body in the nearby Woodbury Brook, off the Saco River. Caswell's body was making its way to the Atlantic Ocean when it got lodged in a culvert. Her corpse remained there until April 13, 1850, when her body was discovered by Saco residents cleaning up the area. Nobody knew the identity of the woman, as she used the fake name Mary Bean when she sought out an abortion. During the examination of the body, the coroner concluded that because of the intensive trauma to her reproductive organs, the infection she had was a result of an abortion, This detail was barely mentioned in Smith's trial that soon followed, as it was improper to talk about abortion during this time period. However, the state of her body was discussed: rotted and decayed after a cold Maine winter. It was discovered that Smith burned Caswell's belongings, including her leather chest, which he attempted to disguise as his own by carving his name into it. He also burned his medical instruments that he had used to perform her abortion.

On April 15, a constable searched Smith's house and found the remnants of him trying to cover up Caswell's presence in his home. Smith became a suspect in the case because of the location where the body was found, and someone recognized the board to which her body was tied as being from his shed. On April 17, he was arrested and charged with the murder of Berengera Caswell. The jury and constable had decided that he was guilty, but they were not sure of the method he used. Some of these actions included: strangulation, administration of savin, a mortal wound with a wire instrument, a mortal wound with an unknown instrument, or by some manner as yet unknown. A descriptive account of her autopsy was given, and it was proven that her death was caused by inflammation and internal infection from the faulty abortion. They stated that Smith's claim of death from typhoid was far from the cause of her death and it was his illegitimate medical practices instead. Women were used as witnesses to prove that Caswell had gone to Smith for an abortion. What tied Caswell to Smith were her memorable earrings. Everyone who testified seemed to remember her because of her drop earrings. All of the evidence combined was enough for the jury to determine that Smith murdered Caswell. He was convicted of second-degree murder and sentenced to life in prison. Newspaper coverage on this case was huge, with coverage throughout New England.

In May of the next year, Nathan Clifford, Smith's attorney, appealed Smith's case to the Maine Supreme Court, arguing that his charge should not be murder, but rather manslaughter. After reviewing the appeal for nearly a year, the Supreme Court decided that Smith had been improperly charged. The murder charge was overturned, and he had already spent enough time in prison to serve a manslaughter charge, so he was set free.

During this time, Caswell's actions were also scrutinized. Some of the key reasons they ridiculed her included her abundance of clothing and the earrings that were previously mentioned. These actions were not approved of because they meant that she was spending frivolously. The reason that these young girls were allowed to work in the factory was under the assumption that they would send their earnings back home to financially support their families. Instead, Caswell was enjoying her financial independence, much like many other young factory girls. Her earrings also suggested something about her morals because during this time, reputable women did not wear such things. In turn, these assumptions implied that she was responsible for her fate. She became a lesson for other girls on to not seek for such independence, and to avoid premarital sex.

== Legacy ==
Berengera Caswell's legacy lived on as the story of Mary Bean, the pseudonym Smith had given her. Eventually, her actual name was dropped altogether by the public as the case stopped being a hot topic, and her story became free range for any authors seeking to add a spin to her tale or use it to their advantage. Mary Bean became a cautionary tale for women of mature age whose early death was used to warn women of the consequences of having premarital sex. Her story was posted in newspaper articles, published in books, and communicated via word of mouth. The newspaper and book publications of Caswell's actions leading to her death, as well as the details and outcome of her murder trial were used to scare women into conforming to what was seen as the correct way to behave.

After the trial, which left many citizens of Saco feeling that Caswell's death had gone unavenged, sensational fiction stories emerged. The two most famous pieces of fiction written about the case were Mary Bean, The Factory Girl and Life of George Hamilton. These "true crime" short stories were loosely based on the true events of the murder of Berengera Caswell, but were highly dramatized and moralized to capture public interest. In these works of fiction, Caswell's name was replaced with her alias Mary Bean, and William Long was framed as a dastardly villain called George Hamilton. The authors, "Miss J.A.B- resident of Manchester" and "Reverend Mr. Miller", also combined the details of the Caswell case with other murders across New England, further villainizing the "evil seducer George Hamilton" in the public's eye. These stories transformed the Smith case into stereotypical works of sensational fiction.

Mary Bean, The Factory Girl tells a tale loosely based on Caswell's life. In this story, a beautiful but naive Mary Bean leaves her soon to be husband, William Churchill, for the seductive George Hamilton, who effectively ruins all aspects of her life. Hamilton takes her away from her home in Canada, impregnates her, attempts to abandon her, murders an innocent tax collector, and then has Mary's pregnancy terminated, which, in the end, takes her life. It's a classic tale of a young woman being taken advantage of- a narrative extremely common in the nineteenth century. This tale was written by an author known only as "Miss J.A.B" who aimed to warn others of what could potentially happen to young factory girls.

Life of George Hamilton continues the story told in Mary Bean, The Factory Girl, but focuses more on George Hamilton's fate after murdering Mary Bean. It was written by Reverend Mr. Miller, who was inspired to continue the story told by Miss J.A.B. In this tale, Hamilton frames his brother for the death of Bean, but ultimately has his plot foiled when Bean's doctor confesses to the crime. Ultimately, Hamilton and the rest of his evil posse end up deceased or in jail, providing further closure to the Mary Bean tale.

Both of these stories were well received by Saco residents. They provided closure to the confusing and worrying death of Caswell by using a familiar fictional template. They also helped to bring the attention of the public back to the case as the trial waged on.
