= Dobbs County Regiment =

American colonial military unit

- Active: 1775-1783
- Allegiance: (United States) North Carolina
- Branch: North Carolina militia
- Type: Militia

Commanders
- Notable commanders: Col. Abraham Sheppard, Sr. Col. Benjamin Exum; Col. James Glasgow; Col. William Caswell; Col. James Darnell; Col. Richard Caswell, Jr.

The Dobbs County Regiment was a unit of the North Carolina militia that served during the American Revolution. The regiment was one of thirty-five existing county militias that were authorized by the North Carolina Provincial Congress to be organized on September 9, 1775. All officers were appointed with commissions from the Provincial Congress. On May 4, 1776, the regiment was placed under the command of the New Bern District Brigade commanded by Brigadier General Richard Caswell. The regiment was active until the end of the Revolutionary War in 1783 and was engaged in twelve known battles and skirmishes in North Carolina, South Carolina and Georgia.

== Officers ==
The following listings show the known commanders, officers, staff, and soldiers of the Dobbs County Regiment

- Col. Abraham Sheppard, Sr. (1775-1776)
- Colonel Benjamin Exum (2nd Colonel) (1776-1779)
- Col. James Glasgow (1777-1778 and 1779-1780)
- Col. William Caswell (1777-1778 and 1779-1780). 2nd Colonel
- Col. James Darnell (1779- )
- Col. Richard Caswell, Jr.

Colonel Richard Caswell, Jr. was the son of Governor Richard Caswell, who was the General in charge of all North Carolina militia and state troops. Colonel Richard Caswell, Jr. was lost at sea on December 27, 1784 during the return voyage from a business trip to Charleston, South Carolina and presumed dead.

== Order of battle ==
The Dobbs County Regiment was involved in 12 known battles and skirmishes:

- February 27, 1776, Moore's Creek Bridge, North Carolina
- March 3, 1779, Brier Creek, Georgia
- June 20, 1779, Stono Ferry, South Carolina
- March 28 to May 12, 1780, Charleston 1780, South Carolina
- August 16, 1780, Camden Court House, South Carolina
- January 17, 1781, Cowpens, South Carolina
- January 30, 1781, Heron's Bridge, North Carolina
- April 25, 1781, Hobkirk's Hill, South Carolina
- August 2, 1781, Rockfish Creek, North Carolina
- August 16, 1781, Battle of Kingston, North Carolina
- August 17, 1781, Webber's Bridge, North Carolina
- August 19, 1781, New Bern, North Carolina

== See also ==
- List of North Carolina militia units in the American Revolution
