= William Caswell (politician) =

American politician

Member of the North Carolina House of Commons from Dobbs County
- In office 1779–1784
- Preceded by: Thomas Gray; Jesse Cobb

Personal details
- Born: September 24, 1754 Johnston County (present-day Lenoir County), North Carolina, British America
- Died: January 6, 1785 (aged 30) Kinston, North Carolina, U.S.
- Spouse: Gathra McIlwaine (m. 1782)
- Children: Richard William Caswell (son)
- Parent: Richard Caswell (father)

Military service
- Allegiance: United States
- Branch/service: North Carolina militia
- Years of service: 1775–1783
- Rank: Brigadier General
- Commands: The Dobbs Regiment (1779); Caswell's Brigade (1779–83)
- Battles/wars: American Revolutionary War; Battle of Great Bridge; Battle of Brandywine (WIA); Battle of Germantown; Battle of Brier Creek

William Caswell (September 24, 1754 – January 6, 1785) was an American politician, lawyer, and planter. Besides service on state court benches, he represented Dobbs County in the North Carolina House of Commons from 1779 to 1784. He was also a senior officer who commanded militia during the American Revolution.

== Biography ==
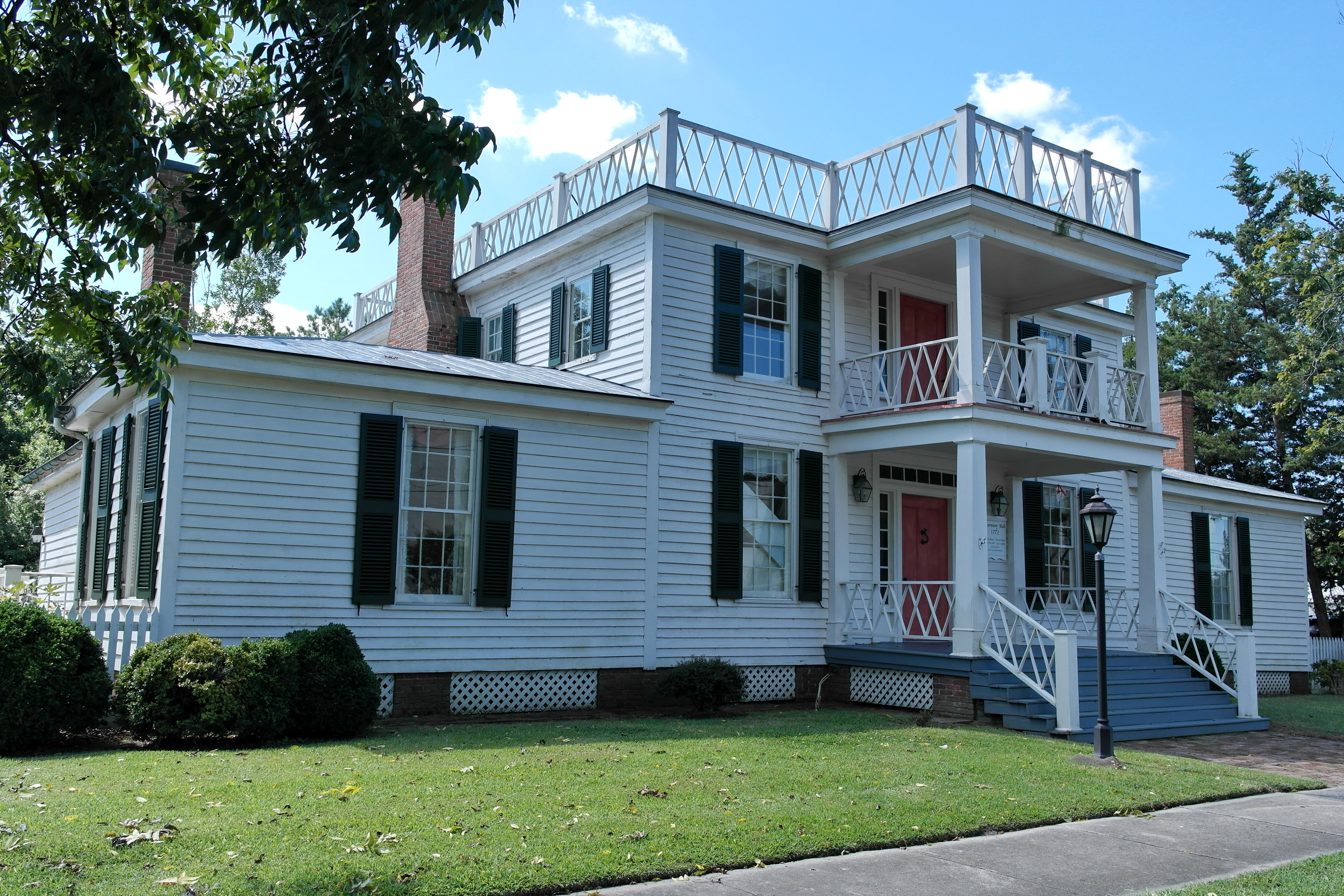
William Caswell's boyhood home in Kinston, North Carolina (built 1772)

William Caswell, the son of Richard and Mary (née Mackilwean) Caswell, was born September 24, 1754, in Johnston County (present-day Lenoir County), Province of North Carolina. He received training by apprenticeship in law and served as the register of deeds for Dobbs County. He attended the Continental Congress in Philadelphia in 1774 with his father. Caswell was elected to the North Carolina House of Commons in 1779 (second session), 1780-1781, 1782, and 1784. After the American Revolution, he resided at his plantation, "Red House," near Kinston, where he died on January 6, 1785.

During the American Revolutionary War, Caswell saw service as a brigadier general commanding Caswell's Brigade, North Carolina militia; appointed May 9, 1779 (1779-1783). Caswell previously served as an ensign in the 2nd North Carolina Regiment, commissioned September 1, 1775 (1775-1776); a captain in the 5th North Carolina Regiment (1776-1778); and Colonel of The Dobbs Regiment, North Carolina militia (1779), appointed 2nd colonel during the third quarter of 1778.
