= North Carolina State Navy =

The North Carolina State Navy during the American Revolutionary War consisted of a relatively modest number of ships, and was active from 1776 to 1779. The state and the Continental Congress were concerned about the defense of Pamlico Sound, and the key Ocracoke Inlet, through which a large number of inbound merchant ships traveled, bringing war-related supplies from Europe and the West Indies.

== History ==
On December 21, 1775, the North Carolina Council of Safety passed a resolution authorizing the acquisition of three ships. Committees were established in Cape Fear, Edenton, and Newbern for their acquisition and outfitting. The provincial congress established pay scales in May 1776, and by October of that year, the brigantine Washington entered service at Cape Fear, the Pennsylvania Farmer entered service at Newbern, and the King Tammany began service at Edenton. Staffing and supply issues, however, meant that these ships actually saw little service in 1776. Some of the crew of the Pennsylvania Farmer, which lay idle due to a lack of ammunition, attempted to desert to the British fleet of Lord Dunmore. By the end of 1777 the expense of maintaining these ships led the state to begin selling them off. Washington was sold in December 1777 and Pennsylvania Farmer was auctioned off in May 1778.

The state embarked on a joint venture with Virginia in May 1776, since the trade of both states depended on the security of Pamlico Sound. The entrance to Chesapeake Bay was regularly patrolled by the Royal Navy, so supply ships bringing goods from France, St. Eustatius, and other ports in the West Indies, instead entered the sound through the Ocracoke Inlet, and offloaded their cargos in the ports of both states that were accessible from the sound. Virginia constructed two ships, Caswell and Washington, for the purpose of monitoring Ocracoke, and North Carolina agreed to contribute to their outfitting and operating expenses. In 1778, after Virginia complained that North Carolina was not contributing sufficiently to their upkeep, North Carolina purchased the Caswell and continued her use as a sentry at the Ocracoke Inlet. The Caswell sank in June 1779, ending North Carolina's operation of ships during the war.

== Privateering and prize administration ==
The state established admiralty courts to adjudicate maritime matters, including the distribution of captured prizes. It also authorized privateering.
