= James Glasgow =

American politician

First Secretary of State of North Carolina
- In office 1777–1798
- Governor: Richard Caswell; Abner Nash; Thomas Burke; Alexander Martin; Samuel Johnston; William Richardson Davie
- Preceded by: none
- Succeeded by: William White

Personal details
- Born: 1735 Province of Maryland
- Died: November 17, 1819 (aged 83–84) Nashville, Tennessee
- Children: Nancy

Military service
- Allegiance: North Carolina militia
- Branch/service: Militia
- Years of service: 1776-1780
- Unit: Dobbs County Regiment
- Battles/wars: Battle of Moore's Creek Bridge

James Glasgow (c. 1735 – November 17, 1819) served as the first North Carolina Secretary of State, from 1777 to 1798.

== Biography ==
=== Early life ===
James Glasgow, the son of a Scottish minister, Reverend James Patrick Glasgow and his wife, Martha Jones, of Cecil County, Maryland. He was born in the Colony of Maryland and educated at the College of William & Mary. After graduation he served as an accounting and corresponding clerk for an import-export house in Suffolk, Virginia.

=== Career ===
He was an officer in the American Revolutionary War in North Carolina, and in December 1776, was rewarded by the last of the state's provincial congresses with the office of Secretary of State. From 1777 to 1781, Glasgow lived at Harmony Hall in Kinston.

Service record:

- Adjutant in the Dobbs County Regiment of the North Carolina militia (1776)
- Major in the Dobbs County Regiment (1776-1777)
- Colonel in the Dobbs County Regiment (1777-1778, 1779-1780)
- Secretary of State (1776-1799)

In 1791, while he was still serving as Secretary of State, the state legislature named a county after him. He resigned in disgrace after a scandal known as the "Glasgow Land Fraud." After his resignation, the county was renamed Greene County.

=== Personal life ===
His daughter, Nancy Glasgow, married Willoughby Williams, a member of the North Carolina House of Representatives, and later remarried to Joseph McMinn, who served as Governor of Tennessee from 1815 to 1821.

Political offices
Preceded by new office	Secretary of State of North Carolina; 1777–1798	Succeeded by William White
