= Richard Caswell =

1st and 5th governor of North Carolina

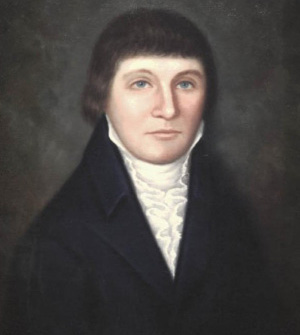

2nd Grand Master of the Masons of North Carolina
- In office 1788–1789
- Preceded by: Samuel Johnston
- Succeeded by: Samuel Johnston

1st and 5th Governor of North Carolina
- In office December 23, 1776 – April 20, 1780
- Preceded by: Himself (as president of the Provincial Congress)
- Succeeded by: Abner Nash
- In office May 13, 1785 – December 20, 1787
- Preceded by: Alexander Martin
- Succeeded by: Samuel Johnston

President of the North Carolina Provincial Congress
- In office November 12, 1776 – December 23, 1776
- Preceded by: Samuel Johnston
- Succeeded by: Himself (as governor of North Carolina)

Personal details
- Born: August 3, 1729 Harford County (present-day Joppa), Maryland, British America
- Died: November 10, 1789 (aged 60) Fayetteville, North Carolina, U.S.
- Resting place: Dobbs County (present-day Lenoir County), North Carolina; 35°15′59.9″N 77°37′15.1″W
- Spouses: Mary Mackilwean (m. 1752; died 1757) Sarah Herritage (m. 1758)
- Children: 11, including William

Military service
- Allegiance: Great Britain; United States
- Branch/service: North Carolina Militia
- Rank: Major General
- Commands: New Bern District; North Carolina Militia
- Battles/wars: War of the Regulation; Battle of Alamance; American Revolutionary War; Battle of Moore's Creek Bridge; Battle of Camden

Richard Caswell (August 3, 1729 – November 10, 1789) was an American politician and lawyer who served as the first and fifth governor of the U.S. state of North Carolina from 1776 to 1780 and from 1785 to 1787. He also served as a senior officer of militia in the Southern theater of the American Revolutionary War. As a delegate to the First Continental Congress, he was a signatory of the 1774 Continental Association.

== Early life ==
Caswell was born on August 3, 1729, in Harford County (present-day Joppa), Maryland; one of eleven children born to Richard and Christian (née Dallam) Caswell. The Caswells moved to New Bern, North Carolina, in 1745. He was appointed deputy surveyor for the province in 1750. While a member of the North Carolina House of Burgesses, a position he held for 17 years, Caswell introduced a bill establishing the "Town of Kingston" (which was later changed to Kinston as a result of the American Revolutionary War). He was a prosperous lawyer, farmer, land speculator, tanner, and grand master of North Carolina.

== Military service ==
Caswell fought the Regulators at Alamance (1771) during the Regulator Movement, where it is thought he commanded the right wing of Governor Tryon's forces.

=== American Revolutionary War ===
Caswell represented North Carolina in the Continental Congresses of 1774 and 1775. When the New Bern District Minutemen was formed in September, 1775; Caswell was appointed to command that minuteman region. As such, he led the Provincial Congress' force at the Battle of Moore's Creek Bridge (1776). Soon after that, the Provincial Congress disbanded minuteman battalions in favor of militia. In 1780, he was commissioned major general of militia and state troops. At the Battle of Camden Court House in 1780, his troops fled after Virginia militia broke and ran in panic, exposing him to attack without greater defense, leaving the Continentals behind to suffer defeat.

After his defeat at Camden Court House, Caswell returned home with an unnamed illness. In the meantime, the North Carolina General Assembly appointed William Smallwood of Maryland to the command of North Carolina's militia without informing Caswell, so he resigned on October 21, 1780. When Smallwood returned to Maryland in January 1781, the General Assembly once again appointed Caswell major general of militia, and he retained the position until the end of the American Revolution.

=== Effective dates of promotion ===
- Colonel of New Bern District Minutemen (1775)
- Brigadier General of militia (1776)
- Major General of militia (1780)

== Governor (1776–1780) ==
Caswell was president of the North Carolina Provincial Congress that wrote the first Constitution of North Carolina in 1776, serving from November 12 to December 23, 1776. He was appointed to serve as the first governor of North Carolina immediately following the dissolution of the Congress and subsequently re-elected by the new North Carolina General Assembly on April 18, 1777. Caswell stepped down in 1780 to command the militia, as the state constitution allowed only three consecutive one-year terms.

== Later career ==
Caswell served as the comptroller of North Carolina and as a member of the North Carolina Senate between his two gubernatorial terms. Caswell was also chosen to be one of North Carolina's delegates to the United States Constitutional Convention of 1787, but he did not attend. At the time of his death in 1789, he had returned once again to the North Carolina General Assembly, this time serving as Speaker of the Senate.

== Personal life ==
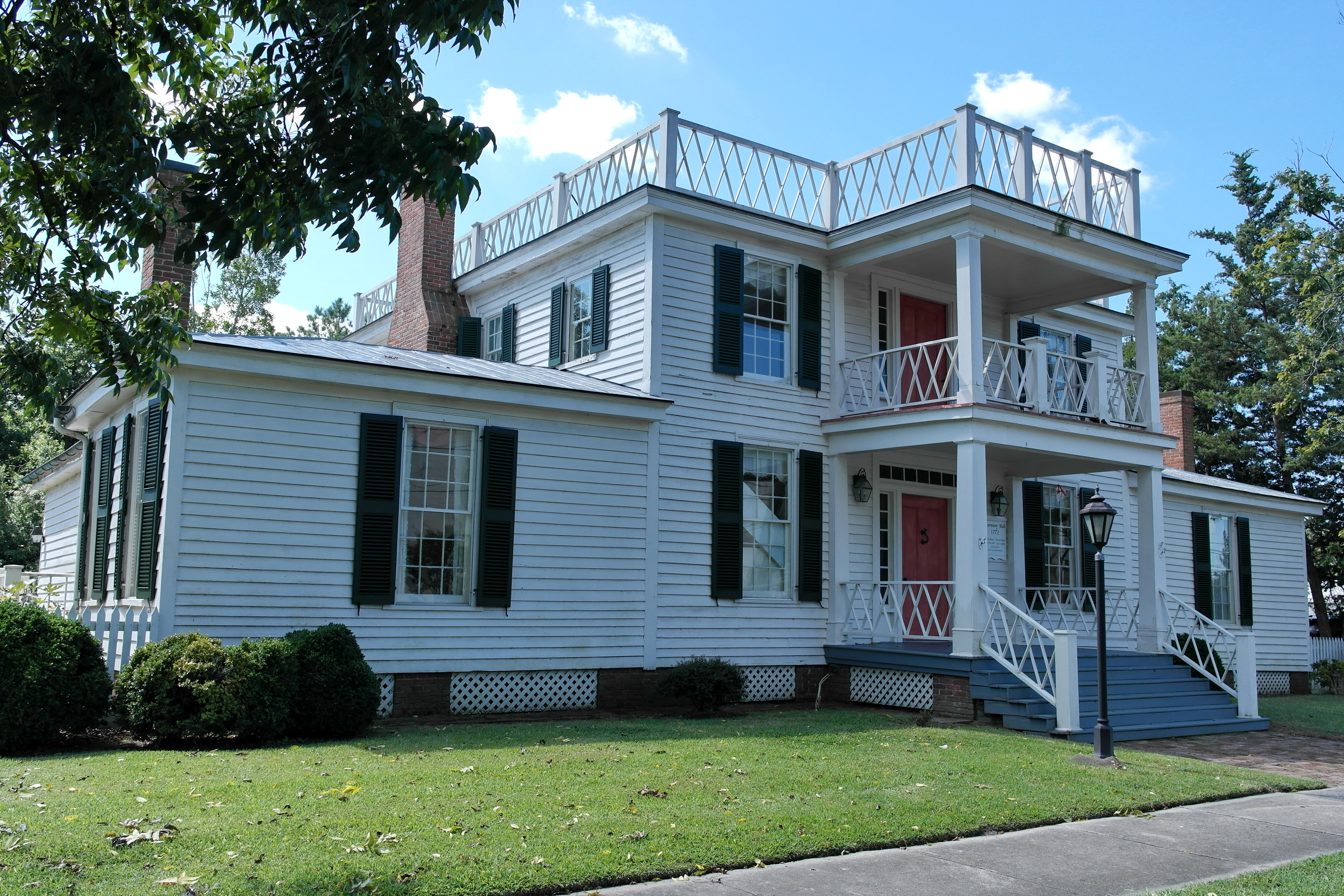
The Caswell House at Kinston

Caswell married Mary Mackilwean, the daughter of James and Elinor Mackilwean. They had three children, including a daughter that died at birth in 1753, William Caswell born in 1754, and another daughter born in 1757, who died as an infant. Mary Caswell died from complications of childbirth. The family lived on a plantation home called Red House, which is the site of the Richard Caswell Memorial Park in Kinston, North Carolina.

After Mary's death, Caswell married Sarah Heritage (1740–1794) on June 20, 1758. Sarah was the daughter of William Heritage and Susannah Moore. They had eight children: Richard Caswell, born in 1759; Sarah Caswell, born in 1762; Winston Caswell, born in 1764; Anna Caswell, born in 1766; Dallam Caswell, born in 1769; John Caswell, born in 1772; Susannah Caswell, born in 1775, and Christian Caswell, born in 1779.

Caswell's son Richard was colonel of Dobbs Regiment and lieutenant colonel of the 2nd North Carolina Regiment during the American Revolutionary War. He was lost at sea in 1784. William, a son by his first marriage, was also colonel of Dobbs Regiment and brigadier general and in command of New Bern District during the war.

== Death and legacy ==
Caswell died in Fayetteville, North Carolina, on November 10, 1789. According to tradition, his body was returned to Kinston for burial in the Caswell family cemetery, near where a memorial and museum stands today.

Among his many accomplishments was Caswell's proposal to use the reimbursement funds for aid rendered to the Crown during the French and Indian War for erecting and establishing a free school in every county. His "Address to the General Assembly" in 1760 on this topic was used for many years by other politicians in favor of public education. He also wrote the proposal into the first North Carolina constitution in 1776. Caswell County, North Carolina, and Fort Caswell were named for him. The Richard Caswell Memorial Museum was established in Kinston, near where he may have been buried.

Political offices
Vacant American Revolution Title last held by Josiah Martin	Governor of North Carolina; 1776–1780	Succeeded by Abner Nash
Preceded by Alexander Martin	Governor of North Carolina; 1784–1787	Succeeded by Samuel Johnston
