= Dobbs County, North Carolina =

Historic county of North Carolina

Coordinates: 35.317°N 77.850°W

- Former county
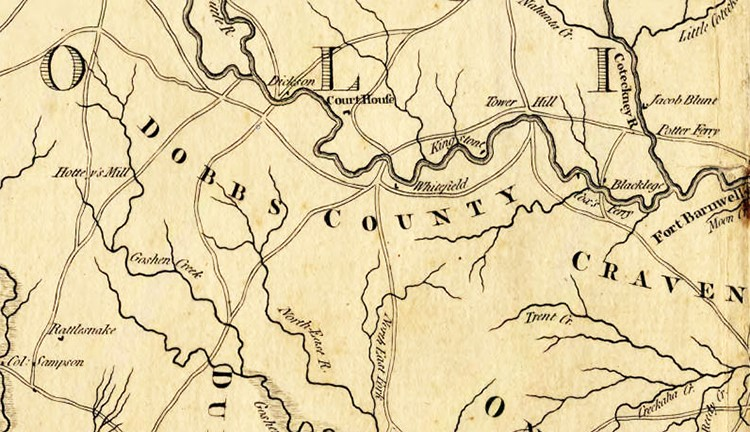
- Dobbs County from a 1775 map of North Carolina
- Etymology: Arthur Dobbs, Governor of North Carolina from 1754 to 1765
- Interactive map of Dobbs County, North Carolina
- Established: 1758
- Extinct: 1791
- Seat: Walnut Creek, Kingston (now Kinston)

Population
  - Total: 6,893 (including 1,915 slaves; 1,790)

Dobbs County, North Carolina was a county located in the U.S. state of North Carolina.

== History ==
Dobbs County was formed in 1758 from Johnston County, though the legislative act that created it did not become effective until April 10, 1759. It was named for Arthur Dobbs, colonial governor of North Carolina from 1754 until 1764.

In 1779, during the American Revolutionary War, the western part was designated as Wayne County. The county seat was moved from its original location on Walnut Creek to the town of Kingston, which was renamed Kinston in 1784. Dobbs went unrepresented in the 1788 Hillsboro Convention to vote on the new constitution of the United States. The Federalist delegation was elected without opposition. The Anti-Federalists abstained. Federalists rioted, as they had done in the previous election after predicting Richard Caswell's loss, stealing the ballot box, and assaulting the sheriff. Hertford County also suffered a Federalist riot. Because the name Dobbs reminded residents of the rejected colonial past, in 1791 the county was divided by the North Carolina legislature into Glasgow (later renamed Greene County) and Lenoir counties; Dobbs ceased to exist.

== See also ==
- List of counties in North Carolina
- List of former United States counties
