= 1783 North Carolina gubernatorial election =

- April 25, 1783

Members of the General Assembly Majority of votes needed to win
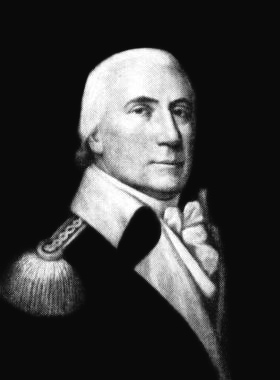

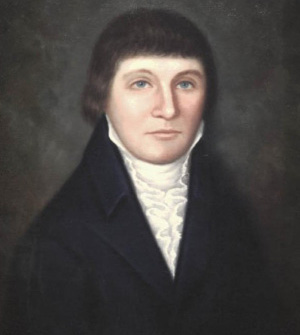
Nominee	Alexander Martin	Richard Caswell
Party	Radical	Moderate
1st ballot	66	49
Governor before election
Alexander Martin
Radical
Elected Governor
Alexander Martin
Radical

A gubernatorial election was held in North Carolina on April 25, 1783. The incumbent governor of North Carolina Alexander Martin defeated the speaker of the North Carolina Senate and former governor Richard Caswell.

Martin was elected in 1782 as a member of the radical–moderate coalition that had dominated North Carolina politics since independence. His term witnessed rising Political factionalism among Whigs following the end of the American War of Independence and the political and economic uncertainty of the Confederation period. Radical, moderate, and conservative Whig factions mirrored the geographic division of the state into Western, Central, and Eastern sections. As a moderate member of the Western radical faction, Martin was poised to benefit from the breakdown of the radical–moderate coalition as the 1783 election approached.

Early speculation focused on former governors Caswell, Abner Nash, and Thomas Burke, and judges of the North Carolina Superior Court Samuel Ashe and John Williams as potential challengers. Some leading conservatives hoped to support the former member of the North Carolina Senate Samuel Johnston, but Johnston effectively removed himself from consideration when he declined to seek re-election to the legislature. Martin, Caswell, Johnston, and Griffith Rutherford were nominated when the legislature met in April. Martin courted votes in Central North Carolina when he backed an effort to relocate the capital to Fayetteville, previously a region supportive of Caswell.

The election was conducted by the North Carolina General Assembly in joint session. Martin was elected with a majority on the first ballot.

Caswell blamed his defeat on Eastern conservative members of the legislature who supported Martin, in revenge for Caswell's decisive endorsement of Martin over Johnston in the last election. However, Penelope Smith argues that Martin's was more likely attributable to the collapse of the radical–moderate coalition, Martin's strong reelection campaign, and his enduring popularity with Westerners.

== General election ==
1783 North Carolina gubernatorial election
Party	Candidate	First ballot	
Party	Candidate	Count	Percent
Radical	Alexander Martin	66	57.39
Moderate	Richard Caswell	49	42.61
Total		115	100.00

== Bibliography ==
- Clark, Walter, ed. (1901). The State Records of North Carolina. Vol. 19, 1782–84. Winston, NC: Nash Brothers.
- Smith, Penelope Sue (1980). Creation of an American State: Politics in North Carolina, 1765–1789 (PhD thesis). Houston: Rice University.
