= 1781 North Carolina gubernatorial election =

- June 25, 1781

Members of the General Assembly Majority of votes needed to win
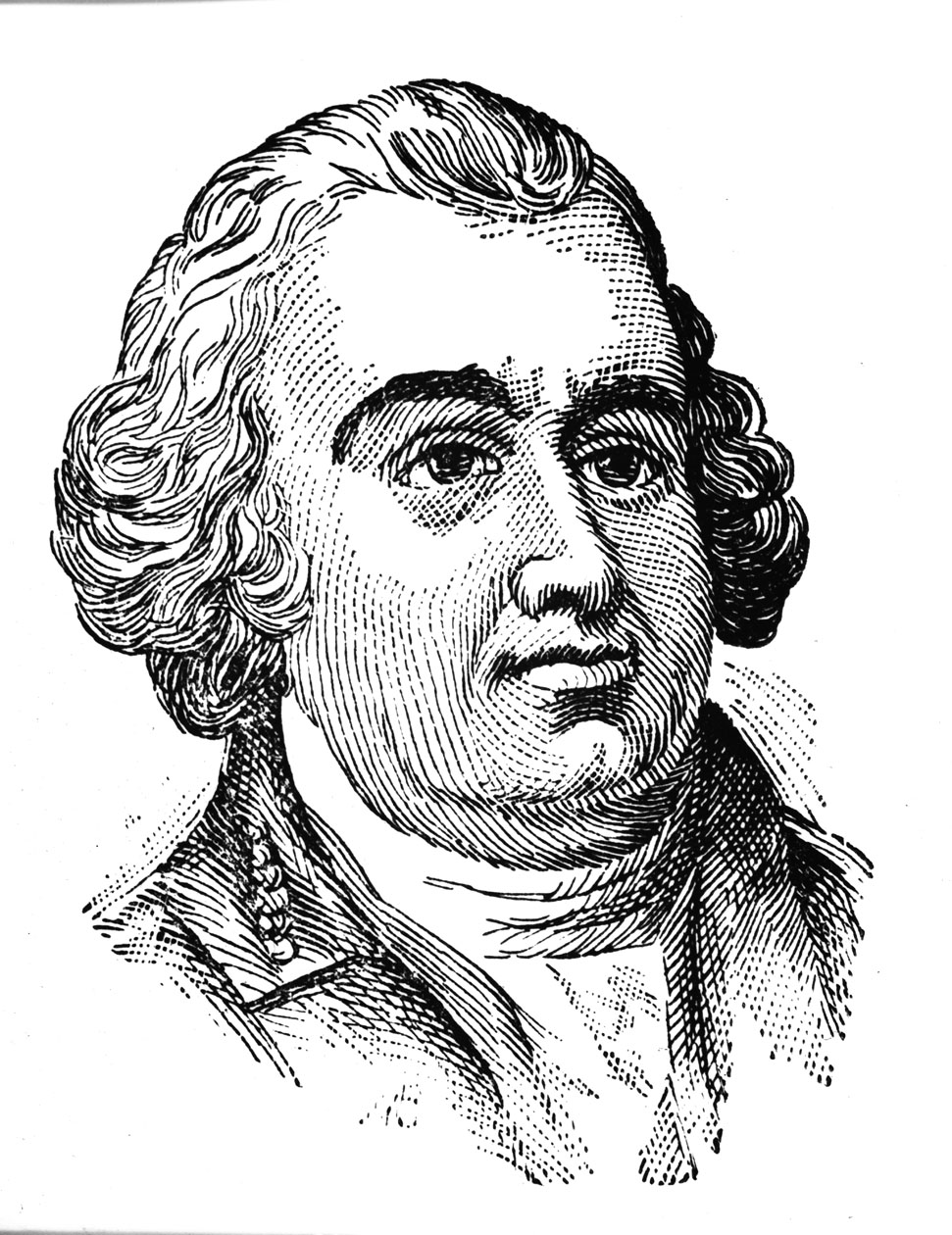

Nominee	Thomas Burke	Samuel Johnston
Party	Radical	Conservative
Governor before election
Abner Nash
Moderate
Elected Governor
Thomas Burke
Radical

A gubernatorial election was held in North Carolina on June 25, 1781. The delegate to the Second Continental Congress from North Carolina, Thomas Burke, defeated the former member of the North Carolina Senate, Samuel Johnston.

The incumbent governor of North Carolina Abner Nash was nominated for re-election but declined to seek a second consecutive term in office. Nash's term was marked by the weakening of the radical–moderate coalition that had dominated North Carolina politics since 1776 and by the partial collapse of civil authority in the face of the British invasion of North Carolina.

Burke and Johnston were the leading candidates in a field that also included the presiding judge of the North Carolina Superior Court, Samuel Ashe; the former member of the North Carolina House of Commons from Halifax County, Willie Jones; and the judge of the Superior Court, John Williams. Johnston was the leader of the conservative faction in the legislature; Burke and Jones were identified as radicals; Ashe was a prominent conservative in the late 1770s; while Williams had affiliated with the radical–moderate coalition during the previous decade and was nominated primarily due to his affable personality.

The election was conducted by the North Carolina General Assembly in joint session. Burke was elected with a majority on the first ballot.

== Bibliography ==
- Clark, Walter, ed. (1896). The State Records of North Carolina. Vol. 17, 1781–85. Winston, NC.
- Connor, R. D. W. (1919). History of North Carolina. Vol. 1, The Colonial and Revolutionary Periods, 1584–1783. Chicago: Lewis Publishing Company.
- Smith, Penelope Sue (1980). Creation of an American State: Politics in North Carolina, 1765–1789 (PhD thesis). Houston: Rice University.
