= Hillsborough District Brigade =

- Active: 1776-1783
- Allegiance: North Carolina
- Branch: North Carolina militia
- Type: Militia

Commanders
- Notable commanders: 1. Brigadier General Thomas Person; 2. Brigadier General John Butler; 3. Brigadier General Ambrose Ramsey (Pro Tempore)

The Hillsborough District Brigade of militia was an administrative division of the North Carolina militia established on May 4, 1776. Brigadier General Thomas Person was the first commander. Companies from the eight regiments of the brigade were engaged in 55 known battles and skirmishes in North Carolina, South Carolina, and Georgia during the American Revolutionary War. It was active until the end of the war.

== Background ==
In 1766, the Province of North Carolina House of Burgess, at the direction of Province of North Carolina Governor William Tryon, divided the state into six judicial districts. The districts did not do away with the county divisions of the state, which continued.

Within the Hillsborough District in 1775 were the counties of Caswell, Chatham, Granville, Orange, Randolph (added in 1779), and Wake.

At the outbreak of the Revolutionary War, the newly formed North Carolina government converted the state's six existing judicial districts into military districts. These districts each comprised a number of counties surrounding a significant town. The six districts, which corresponded with old judicial organizations, were: Edenton, New Bern, Wilmington, Halifax, Salisbury, and Hillsborough. Each district was to supply a brigade of militia regiments under the command of a brigadier general.

After the Third North Carolina Provincial Congress held at Hillsborough (August 20 – September 10, 1775), the districts became known as "military" vice "judicial" districts. These districts were used to organize the North Carolina Minutemen battalions for a six-month trial as state troops, beginning on September 1, 1775. By April 10, 1776, the Provincial Congress decided in favor of district brigades of militia with county militia regiments. Each brigade was led by a brigadier general. The county militia regiments were subordinated to the brigade. At that time, two additional districts were added, further dividing the western part of the state (Washington District Regiment in 1776 and Morgan District in 1784). Also, district representatives were chosen and sent to the North Carolina Provincial Congress. These representatives were instrumental in the passage of the Halifax Resolves, in April 1776, during the Fourth Provincial Congress, which is now often referred to as the "Halifax Congress".

== Brigade history ==
The Hillsborough District Brigade was established on May 4, 1776.

As the militia had a poor reputation for turning out, bounties to induce volunteerism were common during the war. For men who chose not to serve when drafted, there were two options: pay for a substitute to take their place or pay a fine. These options, with some modifications, remained throughout the war.

Brigadier General Thomas Person was appointed the first commander of the Hillsborough District Brigade in 1776. During the 1781 Battle of Guilford Court House, the Hillsborough District was commanded by John Butler.

Each county supplied a regiment (Orange County supplied two regiments), which in turn was composed of various companies. Each company consisted of no less than 50 men and was further divided into five "divisions." One of the five divisions was reserved for "the more aged and infirm men." The other four divisions, of each company, drew lots to determine the rotation they would follow for their tour of service, which usually lasted for three months. Eventually the "fifth division" of "aged and infirm men" was dropped, as was the maximum age limit from 60 to 50. In order to provide a greater pool of available manpower, the old colonial militia exemption list was revised.

Commanders of the Hillsborough District Brigade and their length of service are as follows:

- Brigadier General Thomas Person (1776-1777)
- Brigadier General John Butler (1777-1783)
- Brigadier General Ambrose Ramsey (Pro Tempore) (March 15, 1781)

== Regiments ==
The following table shows the regiments of the Hillsborough District Brigade. In 1778, there was a state level militia organization above the brigade. Each regiment was made up of companies of up to 50 men.

| Unit | Subordinate Brigade | Created | Disbanded | Original Commander, Rank |
|---|---|---|---|---|
| North Carolina Militia and State Troops | Governor | 1778 | 1783 | Ashe, John Sr., M.G. |
| Hillsborough District Brigade | North Carolina Militia | 1776 | 1783 | Person, Thomas, B.G. |
| Caswell County Regiment | Hillsborough | 1777 | 1783 | Saunders, James, Col |
| Chatham County Regiment | Hillsborough | 1775 | 1783 | Ramsey, Ambrose, Col |
| Granville County Regiment | Hillsborough | 1775 | 1783 | Taylor, Joseph, Col |
| Mounted Volunteers Regiment | Hillsborough | 1780 | 1780 | Taylor, Philip, Col |
| Northern Orange County Regiment | Hillsborough | 1776 | 1777 | Saunders, James, Col |
| Orange County Regiment, aka Southern Orange County Regiment 1776-1777 | Hillsborough | 1775 | 1783 | Hogan, John, Col |
| Randolph County Regiment | Hillsborough | 1779 | 1783 | Balfour, Andrew, Col |
| Wake County Regiment | Hillsborough | 1775 | 1783 | Hinton, John, Col |

=== Caswell County Regiment ===
The Caswell County Regiment started out as the Northern Orange County Regiment when the original Orange County Regiment was split into two separate and distinct regiments. The commandant was Colonel James Saunders. Under this name the regiment did not serve in any engagements. |-

On May 9, 1777, the Northern Orange County Regiment was renamed the Caswell County Regiment. Colonel James Saunders continued as the commandant of the Caswell County Regiment.

- Colonel James Saunders (1775-1776, Hillsborough District Minutemen), (1776-1777, Northern Orange County Regiment), (1777-1783, Caswell County Regiment)
- Colonel William Moore (1775-1776, major in the Orange County Regiment), (1776-1777, Lt Col in the Northern Orange County Regiment), (1777-1782, 2nd Colonel in the Caswell County Regiment)
- Colonel George Oldham (1776, private in the Northern Orange County Regiment), (1776, ensign in the Northern Orange County Regiment), (1779-1780, lieutenant in the Caswell County Regiment), (1780-1781, captain in the Caswell County Regiment (1781-1783, major in the Caswell County Regiment), (1783, 2nd colonel in the Caswell County Regiment)

=== Chatham County Regiment ===
The Chatham County Regiment was a unit of the North Carolina militia that served during the American Revolution. The North Carolina General Assembly authorized the Chatham County Regiment on September 9, 1775, along with 34 other county regiments. The officers were appointed and commissioned by the Governor of North Carolina. The regiment was subordinated to the Hillsboro District Brigade of North Carolina militia on May 4, 1776. The regiment was disbanded at the end of the war.

The colonels of the Chatham County Regiment were:

- Colonel Ambrose Ramsey (commander 1775–1783) (also served as Brigadier Pro Tempore of the Salisbury District Brigade on March 15, 1781)
- Colonel John Luttrell (1781), 2nd Colonel
- Colonel Jeduthan Harper (1781–1783), 2nd Colonel

=== Granville County Regiment ===
The Granville County Regiment was one of the 35 existing county militias to be authorized as a regiment of the North Carolina militia by the North Carolina Provincial Congress on September 9, 1775. It was active until the end of the war. The colonels included:

- Colonel Joseph Taylor (1775-1783, commandant)
- Colonel Robert Harris (1776-1778)
- Colonel Samuel Smith (1778-1779)
- Colonel John Dickerson (1780, commandant)
- Colonel Philip Taylor (1780-1781), (1780, commander of the Mounted Volunteers)
- Colonel Charles Rust Eaton (1781-1783)

The North Carolina Council of State authorized Col Taylor to create the Mounted Volunteers Regiment of Cavalry in August 1780. They were assigned to keep the Loyalists from rising up around Chatham and Randolph counties. They were sent to the Salisbury District in September of 1780 to join up with the North Carolina State Cavalry-Western District in September 1780 in anticipation of contact with General Cornwallis. They were engaged with the Battle of Charlotte on September 26, 1780 and the skirmish as Polk's Mill on October 9, 1780. The unit was short lived and was disbanded in December of 1780.

=== Randolph County Regiment ===
The Randolph County Regiment was created when Randolph County was created by the North Carolina General Assembly on February 2, 1779 from the southern third of Guilford County. The officers were appointed and commissioned by the Governor. The regiment was active until the end of the war in 1783. Colonels of the regiment included:

- Colonel Andrew Balfour (1779-1782, commandant) He was murdered at his home by the Loyalist officer, Colonel David Fanning.
- Colonel John Collier (1779-1782)
- Colonel Edward Sharpe (1782-1783)
- Colonel James Dougan (1782-1783)
- Colonel Thomas Dougan (1783)

=== Wake County Regiment ===
The Wake County Regiment was one of the 35 existing county militias to be authorized as a regiment of the North Carolina militia by the North Carolina Provincial Congress on September 9, 1775. It was active until the end of the war. The colonels included:

- Colonel John Hinton, Sr. (1775-1778)
- Colonel Michael Rogers (1778-1783)
- Colonel John Hinton, Jr. (1778-1783)
- Colonel James Hinton (1780)

== Engagements ==
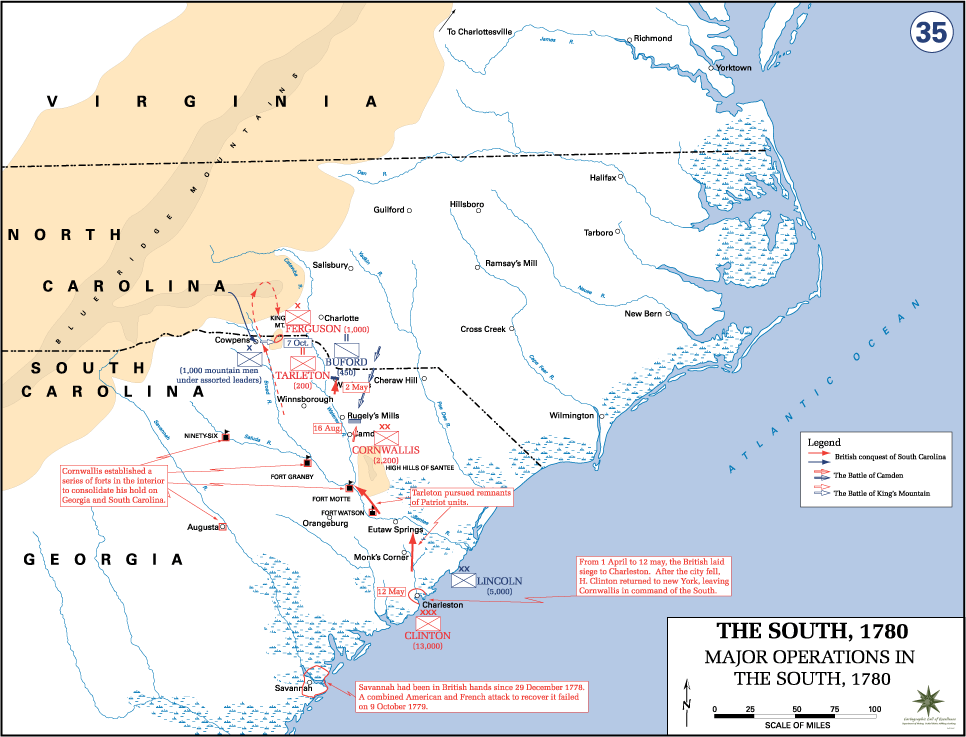
Major engagements in the Southern Campaign

Militia from the Hillsborough District participated in nearly all of the important southern campaigns and engagements. Orange County militia were particularly involved in engagements including Stono Creek, Charleston, Camden, Cowpens, Cowan's Ford, Clapp's Mill, Guilford Court House, and Lindley's Mill. Regiments of the Hillsborough District Brigade were involved in 55 known engagements (battles, sieges, and skirmishes), including one in Georgia, 11 in South Carolina, 36 in North Carolina. One or more companies of these regiments were involved in each engagement.

| Order | Date | Battle | State | Caswell | Chatham | Granville | Mounted Volunteers | Northern Orange | Orange | Randolph | Wake |
|---|---|---|---|---|---|---|---|---|---|---|---|
| 1 | 2/27/1776 | Battle of Moore's Creek Bridge | NC | | x | x | | | x | | x |
| 2 | 3/3/1779 | Battle of Briar Creek | GA | x | x | x | | x | x | | x |
| 3 | 6/20/1779 | Battle of Stono Ferry | SC | x | | x | | x | x | | x |
| 4 | 3/28/1780 to 5/12/1780 | Siege of Charleston 1780 | SC | x | x | x | | x | x | | x |
| 5 | 6/20/1780 | Battle of Ramsour's Mill | NC | | | | | x | x | | |
| 6 | 8/11/1780 | Battle of Little Lynches Creek | SC | x | x | x | | x | x | x | x |
| 7 | 8/16/1780 | Battle of Camden | SC | x | x | x | | x | x | x | x |
| 8 | 8/18/1780 | Battle of Fishing Creek | SC | x | | | | | | | |
| 9 | 9/26/1780 | Battle of Charlotte | NC | | | | x | | | | |
| 10 | 10/7/1780 | Battle of Kings Mountain | SC | x | x | x | | | | | |
| 11 | 10/9/1780 | Battle of Polk's Mill | NC | | | x | x | | | | |
| 12 | 10/14/1780 | Battle of Shallow Ford | NC | x | | | | | | | |
| 13 | 12/4/1780 | Skirmish at Rugeley's Mills #2 | SC | x | | x | | x | x | | |
| 14 | 1/17/1781 | Battle of Cowpens | SC | x | | x | | x | x | x | |
| 15 | 2/1/1781 | Battle of Cowan's Ford | NC | x | x | x | | x | x | x | x |
| 16 | 2/1/1781 | Battle of Tarrant's/Torrence's Tavern | NC | x | | x | | x | x | x | x |
| 17 | 2/3/1781 to 2/4/1781 | Battle of Trading Ford | NC | | x | | | | | | |
| 18 | 2/25/1781 | Battle of Haw River | NC | x | x | | | x | x | | |
| 19 | 3/4/1781 | Battle of Clapp's Mill #1 | NC | x | | | | | | | |
| 20 | 3/6/1781 | Battle of Whitesell's Mill | NC | x | | | | x | x | | |
| 21 | 3/7/1781 | Skirmish at Reedy Fork | NC | x | | | | | | | |
| 22 | 3/15/1781 | Battle of Alamance | NC | | x | | | | | | |
| 23 | 3/15/1781 | Battle of Guilford Court House | NC | x | x | x | | x | x | x | x |
| 24 | 3/19/1781 | Battle of Ramsey's Mill | NC | | | | | x | x | | |
| 25 | 3/31/1781 | Skirmish at Cole's Bridge #2 | NC | | | | | | | x | |
| 26 | 4/25/1781 | Battle of Hobkirk's Hill | SC | x | x | | | | | | x |
| 27 | 5/9/1781 | Battle of Deep River #1 | NC | | | | | | x | | |
| 28 | 5/11/1781 | Battle of Buffalo Ford | NC | | | | | | | x | |
| 29 | 5/21/1781-6/19/1781 | Siege of Ninety-Six 1781 | SC | x | x | x | | | | | |
| 30 | 6/8/1781 | Battle of Cox's Mill #1 | NC | | x | | | x | x | x | |
| 31 | 7/17/1781 | Chatham Courthouse | NC | | x | | | | | | |
| 32 | 7/29/1781 | Battle of House in the Horseshoe | NC | | x | | | | | | |
| 33 | 8/4/1781 | Battle of Beatti's Bridge | NC | | | | | | | x | |
| 34 | 9/1/1781 | Battle of Little Raft Swamp | NC | | x | | | | | | |
| 35 | 9/01/1781 to 9/30/1781 | Battle of Brown Marsh | NC | x | x | | | x | x | x | x |
| 36 | 9/01/1781 to 9/30/1781 | Battle of Beck's Ford | NC | | | | | | | x | |
| 37 | 9/8/1781 | Battle of Eutaw Springs | SC | x | | x | | x | x | x | x |
| 38 | 9/12/1781 | Battle of Hillsborough | NC | | x | | | x | x | | |
| 39 | 9/12/1781 | Battle of Kirk's Farm | NC | | | | | x | x | | |
| 40 | 9/13/1781 | Battle of Lindley's Mill | NC | x | x | | | x | x | x | x |
| 41 | 9/23/1781 | Battle of Livingston's Creek | NC | x | | | | | | | |
| 42 | 10/01/1781 to 10/01/1781 | Battle of Brush Creek | NC | x | x | | | x | x | x | |
| 43 | 10/01/1781 to 10/30/1781 | Battle of Bear Creek | NC | | x | | | | | | |
| 44 | 10/15/1781 | Battle of Raft Swamp | NC | | x | x | | x | x | x | x |
| 45 | 11/15/1781 | Battle of Brick House | NC | | x | | | | | | |
| 46 | 11/16/1781 | Battle of Seven Creeks | NC | | x | | | | | | |
| 47 | 11/18/1781 | Evacuation of Wilmington | NC | | | | | | | x | |
| 48 | 12/10/1781 | Battle of Cox's Mill #3 | NC | x | | | | | | | |
| 49 | 1/7/1782 | Battle of Gholson's Farm | NC | | x | | | | | | |
| 50 | 2/11/1782 | Battle of Deep River #2 | NC | | x | | | x | x | | |
| 51 | 3/01/1782 to 3/31/1782 | Battle of Forks of the Yadkin | NC | | | | | | | x | |
| 52 | 3/11/1782 | Balfour's Plantation | NC | | | | | | | x | |
| 53 | 3/13/1782 to 3/14/1782 | Battle of Randolph County Court House | NC | x | | | | | | x | |
| 54 | 5/1/1782 to 5/31/1782 | Battle of Deep River #3 | NC | | | | | | | x | |
| 55 | 9/22/1782 | Battle of Faith Rock | NC | | | | | | | x | |
