= 1782 North Carolina gubernatorial election =

- April 22, 1782

Members of the General Assembly Majority of votes needed to win
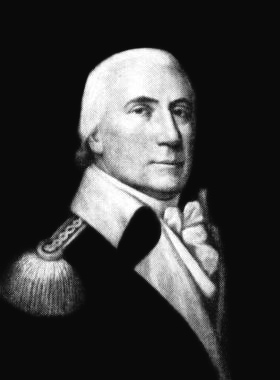

Nominee	Alexander Martin	Samuel Johnston
Party	Radical	Conservative
Governor before election
Thomas Burke
Radical
Elected Governor
Alexander Martin
Radical

A gubernatorial election was held in North Carolina on April 22, 1782. The speaker of the North Carolina Senate Alexander Martin defeated the former member of the Senate Samuel Johnston.

The incumbent governor of North Carolina Thomas Burke was nominated for re-election but declined to seek a second consecutive term in office. Martin and Johnston were the leading candidates. Martin, a moderate Westerner, represented the radical–moderate coalition that had led the state since 1776, while Johnston was the leader of the conservative political faction. The member of the North Carolina House of Commons from Rowan County William Sharpe and the judge of the North Carolina Superior Court John Williams were also nominated. Williams had been affiliated with the radical–moderate coalition during the previous decade and was nominated primarily due to his affable personality. The intervention of the former governor and senator from Dobbs County Richard Caswell was decisive in swinging the election to Martin.

The election was conducted by the North Carolina General Assembly in joint session. No candidate had a majority after the first ballot, requiring multiple additional rounds of voting. Martin was elected with a majority on the final ballot.

Despite his defeat, Johnston's strong showing signaled the ascendancy of the conservative faction after several years in opposition. The radical–moderate coalition was weakened, but had not yet begun to disintegrate, as represented by Caswell's support for Martin. Caswell would subsequently challenge Martin in the 1783 North Carolina gubernatorial election, contributing to the breakdown of the coalition during the Confederation period.

== Bibliography ==
- Clark, Walter, ed. (1899). The State Records of North Carolina. Vol. 16, 1782–83. Winston, NC.
- Smith, Penelope Sue (1980). Creation of an American State: Politics in North Carolina, 1765–1789 (PhD thesis). Houston: Rice University.
