= Gary Kowalski =

Gary Kowalski may refer to:

- Gary Kowalski (politician) (born 1952), politician in Manitoba, Canada
- Gary Kowalski (American football) (born 1960), American football player
- Gary A. Kowalski (born 1953), American author
