= Richard Warren =

Mayflower passenger (1585–1628)

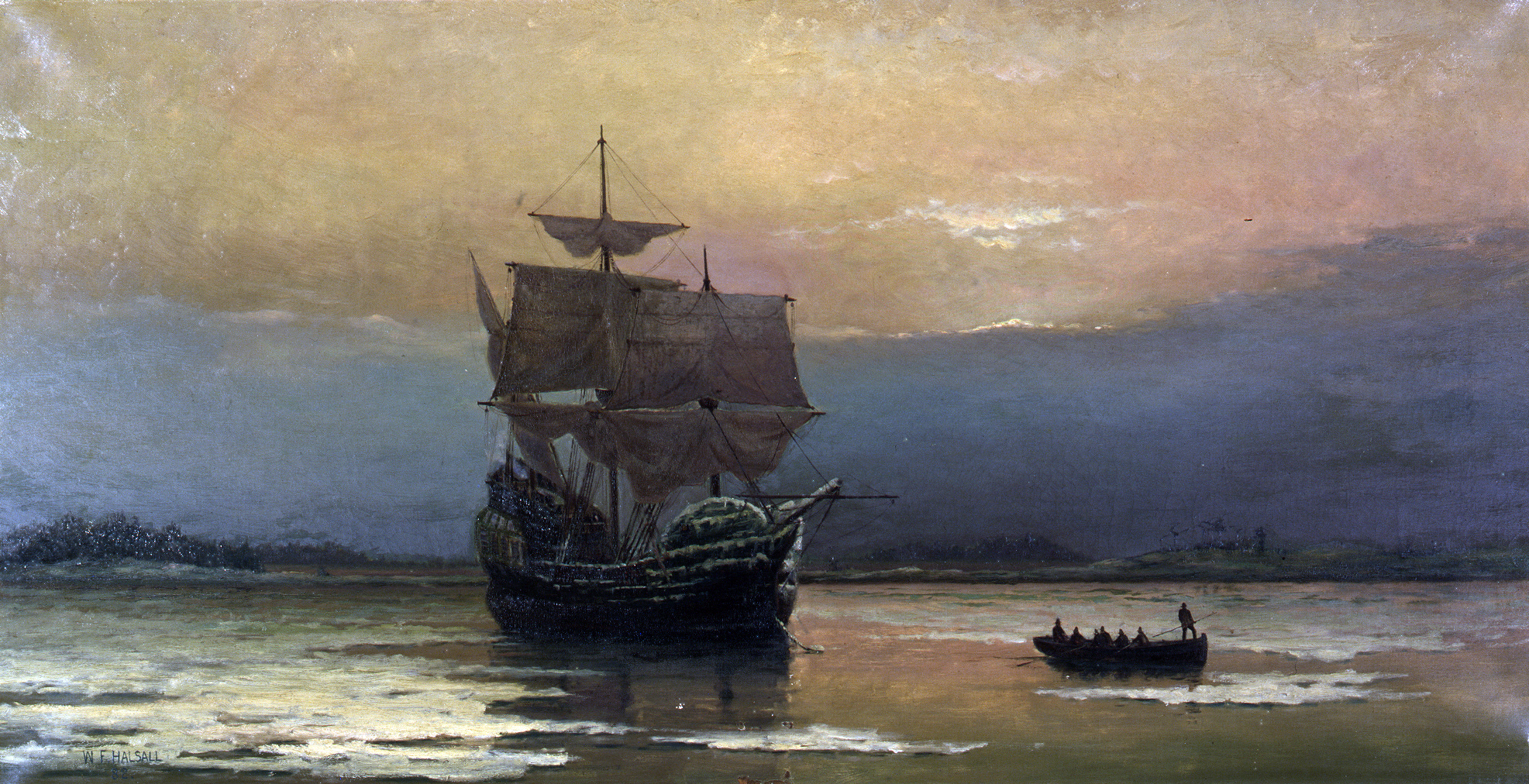
Mayflower in Plymouth Harbor by William Halsall (1882)

Richard Warren (c. 1583 – 1628) was one of the passengers on the Pilgrim ship Mayflower. He was one of the 41 men to sign the Mayflower Compact.

== Early life ==
Richard Warren married Elizabeth Walker, at Great Amwell, Hertfordshire, on 14 April 1610. Elizabeth Walker was the daughter of Augustine Walker of Great Amwell. She was baptised at Baldock in September 1583. This information came to light with the discovery of Augustine Walker's will dated 19 April 1613, in which he named his daughter Elizabeth and her children Mary, Ann and Sarah Warren.

Based on his marriage in Hertfordshire, speculation is that he also came from that county. His parentage and apparent birthplace are uncertain, but there is a Warren family that may be of that ancestry residing in the vicinity of Therfield.

The author and genealogist Charles Edward Banks states that Warren came from London and was called a "merchant" of that city. Warren was one of those very few English merchants who signed on to make the Mayflower voyage as a member of the Leiden contingent. His reason for this has not been determined, and given his status, it is unusual that little is actually known of him.

== Mayflower ==
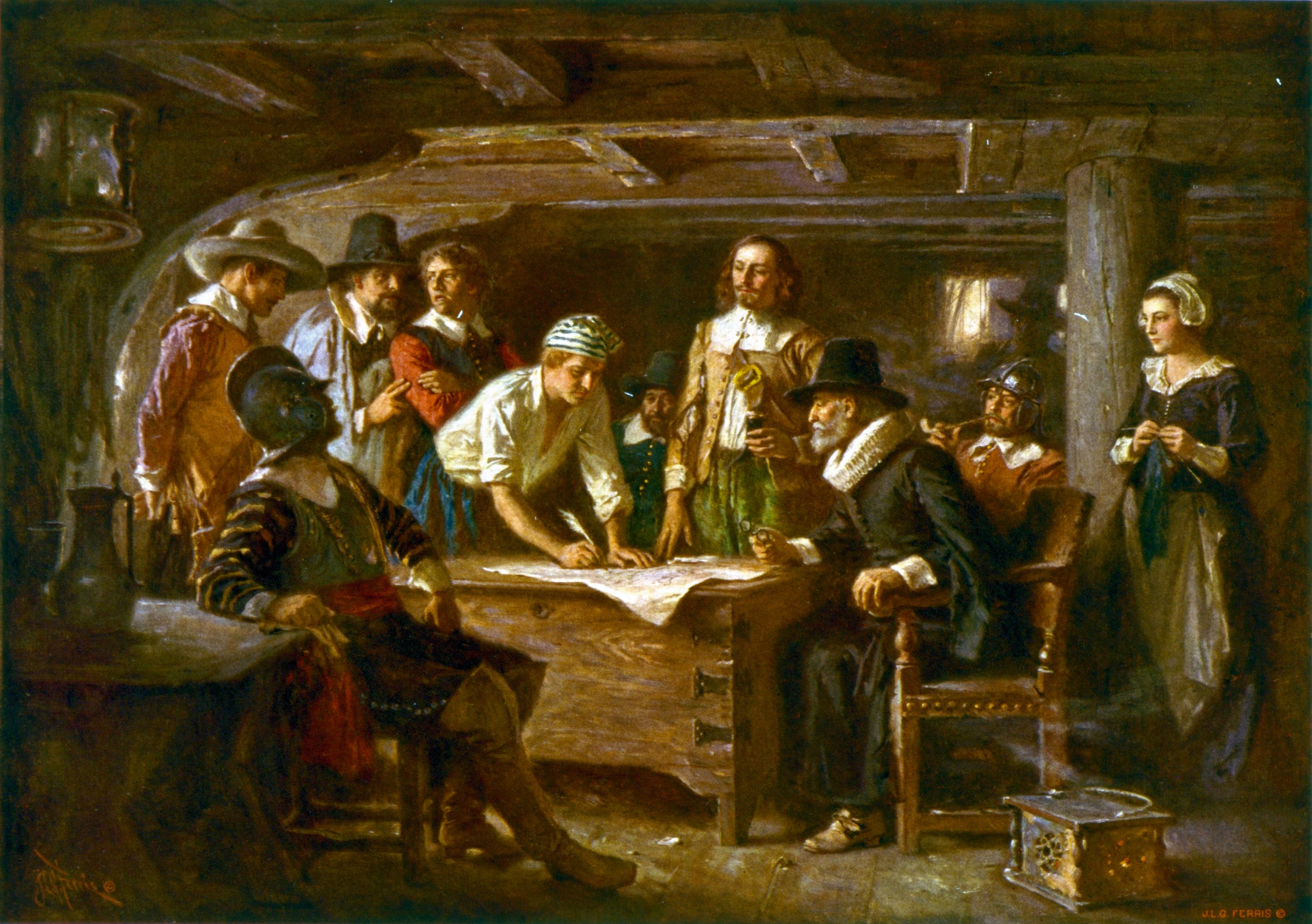
Signing the Mayflower Compact 1620, a painting by Jean Leon Gerome Ferris 1899

At the time of Mayflower's voyage in 1620, Richard and his wife had five daughters: Mary, Ann, Sarah, Elizabeth and Abigail. But Richard came on Mayflower alone, deciding to wait until conditions in the New World were satisfactory before bringing over his family. Governor William Bradford recalled of that time, "Mr. Richard Warren, but his wife and children were lefte behind, and came afterwards."

Mayflower departed Plymouth, England, on 6/16 September 1620. The small, 100 ft (30 m) ship had 102 passengers and a crew of about 30–40 in extremely cramped conditions. By the second month out, the ship was being buffeted by strong westerly gales, causing the ship's timbers to be badly shaken with caulking failing to keep out sea water, and with passengers, even in their berths, lying wet and ill. This, combined with a lack of proper rations and unsanitary conditions for several months, contributed to what would be fatal for many, especially the majority of women and children. On the way there were two deaths, a crew member and a passenger, but the worst was yet to come after arriving at their destination when, in the space of several months, almost half the passengers perished in the cold, harsh, unfamiliar New England winter.

On 9/19 November 1620, after about three months at sea, they spotted land, which was the Cape Cod Hook, now called Provincetown Harbor. After several days of trying to sail south to their planned destination of the Colony of Virginia, strong winter seas forced them to return to the harbor at Cape Cod hook, where they anchored on 11/21 November. The Mayflower Compact was signed that day. Richard Warren's name appears 12th in the list, according to Nathaniel Morton's enumeration of it.

== In the New World ==
Warren participated in some of the early explorations of Cape Cod, when a suitable settlement location was being searched for.

One such extensive exploration began on Wednesday, 6 December 1620 in freezing weather using the ship's shallop, a light, shallow-water boat with oars and sails which was navigated by two pilots, with a master gunner and three sailors. Pilgrims on board, in addition to Warren, were senior members Governor John Carver, Bradford, Myles Standish and Edward Winslow along with John and Edward Tilley, John Howland, Stephen Hopkins and Hopkins' servant, Edward Doty. These persons were less than half the number of the previous exploration due to many having been felled by illness. The English explored in freezing temperatures wearing unsuitable clothing due to not planning for the severity of the New England winter weather. This exploration would result in their first encounter with Indians and did not turn out well, as they learned that slow-firing muskets were no match for rapid-fire arrows. This Indian challenge to the Pilgrims was later known as the "First Encounter".

In 1623 Warren felt that conditions were right to bring his family over from England, and they arrived that year on the Anne.

In the 1623 Division of Land, Warren received two "akers" (acres) of land in one area—"these lye one the north side of the towne nexte adjoyning to their gardens which came in Fortune" and five acres in another—"these following lye on the other side of the towne towards the eele-riuer (Eel River)" (as Richard "Waren").

In Plymouth two more children were added to their family. In 1624 his wife Elizabeth gave birth to a son Nathaniel and in 1626 another son, Joseph."

In 1626, 27 Plymouth settlers, called Purchasers, were involved with the colony joint-stock company which afterwards was turned over to the control of senior colony members. That group was called Undertakers, and were made up of such as Bradford, Standish and Allerton initially who were later joined by Winslow, Brewster, Howland, Alden, Prence and others from London, former Merchant Adventurers. The agreement was dated 26 October 1626 and was finalised sometime in 1627. Warren may have originally been a party to the agreement, but due to his death, which may have been sometime in 1628, his name on the charter was replaced by that of his wife, recorded as "Elizabeth Warren, widow." Elizabeth Warren, as a widow, was named in a law passed by the Plymouth Court specifically to give her the Purchaser status that her husband had: "hee dying before he had performed the bargaine, the said Elizabeth performed the same after his decease, …"

In the 1627 Division of Cattle, Richard, his wife and their seven children, in the ninth lot, received several animals that had arrived on the ship Jacob, apparently in 1625. The ninth lot also listed John Billington and the Soule (spelled Sowle) family.

In his "Increasings and Decreasings", Bradford assigns Warren the title of "Mr." which indicates someone of status, but does not mention him at all in his recording of Plymouth history. And except for a few mentions elsewhere, not very much is known about him in Plymouth, but the Warren family does seem to have been among those with wealth.

During her widowhood, Elizabeth Warren's name is noted in Plymouth Colony records. She was listed as the executor of her husband's estate, paying taxes as head of household and as an independent agent in her own right.

== Marriage and children ==
Coat of Arms of Richard Warren

Richard Warren married Elizabeth Walker, daughter of Augustine Walker, on 14 April 1610, at Great Amwell, Hertfordshire.

Children of Richard and Elizabeth Warren:

- Mary was born about 1610 and died on 27 March 1683 in Plymouth. She married Robert Bartlett about 1629 and had eight children. He died between 19 September and 29 October 1676 in Plymouth. She and her husband were buried at White Horse Cemetery Plymouth, Mass.
- Ann was born about 1611/2 and died after 19 February 1675/6. She married Thomas Little on 28 April 1633 in Plymouth and had nine children. He died shortly before 12 March 1671/2 in Marshfield.
- Sarah was born about 1613 and died after 15 July 1696. She married John Cooke, son of Francis Cooke, on 28 March 1634 and had five children. He died on 23 November 1695 in Dartmouth.
- Elizabeth was born about 1615 and died on 9 March 1669/70 in Hingham, MA. She married Richard Church by 1635/6 and had eleven children. He died 27 December 1668 in Dedham.
- Abigail was born about 1619 and died after 3 January 1692/3 in Marshfield. She married Anthony Snow on 8 November 1639 in Plymouth and had six children. He died in August 1692 in Marshfield.
- Nathaniel was born about 1624 in Plymouth and died between 21 July and 31 October 1667 in Plymouth. He married Sarah Walker on 19 November 1645 in Plymouth and had twelve children. She died on 24 November 1700.
- Joseph was born by 1627 in Plymouth and died on 4 May 1689 in Plymouth. He married Priscilla Faunce about 1653 and had six children. She died on 15 May 1707 in Plymouth.

== Death and burial ==
Warren died of unknown causes, possibly sometime in 1628, exact date unknown. Morton, in his 1669 book New England's Memorial, recorded that "This Year [1628] died Mr. Richard Warren, who .... was an useful Instrument; and during his life bare a deep share of the Difficulties and Troubles of the first Settlement of the Plantation of New-Plymouth [sic]" (p. 68).

From Bradford's recorded Plymouth history:

"Mr. Richard Warren lived some *4* or *5* years, and had his wife come over to him, by whom he had *2* sons before [he] dyed; and one of them is maryed, and hath *2* children. So his increase is *4* But he had *5* doughters more came over with his wife, who are all married, and living, and have many children."

Banks states that Warren died before 1628 and that he was probably considerably past middle life at the time of emigration in 1620.

Warren's widow Elizabeth lived to be more than ninety years old, dying on 2 October 1673. Her death was noted in Plymouth Colony records: "Misstris Elizabeth Warren, an aged widow, ...haveing lived a godly life, came to her grave as a shoke of corn fully ripe".

== Descendants ==
Because all seven of Richard and Elizabeth Warren's children survived and had families, they have very many descendants today. Some notable descendants include:

- Ulysses S. Grant, 18th president of the United States and noted Civil War General
- Franklin Delano Roosevelt, 32nd president of the United States
- Grace Coolidge, first lady of the United States (1923–1929)
- Sarah Palin, vice-presidential candidate and former governor of Alaska
- Sir Charles Tupper, Canadian prime minister
- Joseph Warren, Founding Father and American Patriot leader killed at the Battle of Bunker Hill
- Kurt Cobain, lead songwriter, guitarist, and singer of Nirvana
- Taylor Swift, American singer-songwriter
- Orson Welles, noted American actor, director, writer, and producer
- Henry Wadsworth Longfellow, American poet and educator
- Henry David Thoreau, American philosopher, poet, and author
- Randall Franks, American actor, singer, and author
- R.A. Torrey, American evangelist, pastor, educator and writer
- Robert P. Shuler, American evangelist
- Alan Shepard, American astronaut, fifth person to walk on the Moon
- Richard Gere, American actor
- Glenn Ford, American actor
- Gary A. Kowalski, American author
- Sue DiCicco, American artist and author
- William Barrett II, North Carolina Revolutionary War captain, sheriff, and politician
- L. L. Bean, American business entrepreneur
- John Posey (actor), American actor, writer
- Tyler Posey, American actor, singer
- Ernest Hemingway, American author
- Marie-Chantal, Crown Princess of Greece
- John Cena, American professional wrestler, actor, rapper
- Laura Ingalls Wilder, American author
- King Princess, American singer-songwriter
- Josiah Warren, American utopian socialist, American individualist anarchist, individualist philosopher, polymath, social reformer, inventor, musician, printer and author
- Jen Golbeck, American computer scientist
- Rear Admiral Royal Ingersoll, Chief of Staff to Admiral Robley Evans during the cruise of the Great White Fleet
- Admiral Royal E. Ingersoll, Commander in Chief of the United States Navy Atlantic Fleet during World War 2
- Billie Eilish, American singer-songwriter
- Jeffrey Dahmer, serial killer
