= 1780 North Carolina gubernatorial election =

- April 17, 1780

Members of the General Assembly Majority of votes needed to win
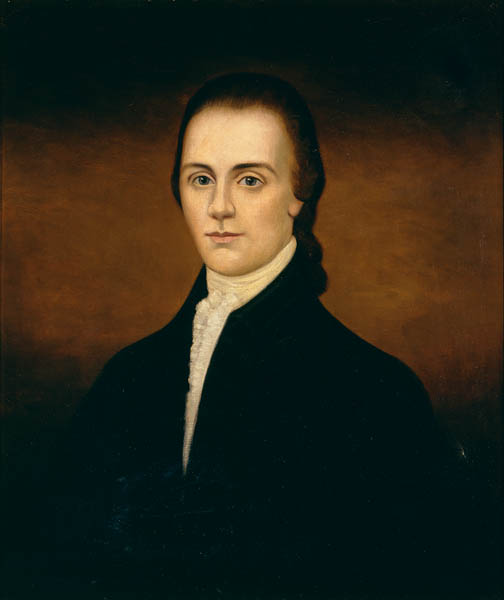
Nominee	Abner Nash
Party	Moderate
Governor before election
Richard Caswell
Moderate
Elected Governor
Abner Nash
Moderate

A gubernatorial election was held in North Carolina on April 17, 1780. The member of the North Carolina Senate from Jones County Abner Nash was elected.

The incumbent governor of North Carolina Richard Caswell was ineligible for re-election due to term limits established by the Constitution of North Carolina. Nash was a political moderate friendly with the conservative Political faction in the legislature and had served previously as the first Speaker of the North Carolina House of Commons. Although not personally popular, and lacking ties to the influential Albemarle and Cape Fear River interests, his commitment to the Patriot cause was considered "impeccable."

The election was conducted by the North Carolina General Assembly.

== Bibliography ==
- Clark, Walter, ed. (1896). The State Records of North Carolina. Vol. 14, 1779–80. Winston, NC.
- Smith, Penelope Sue (1980). Creation of an American State: Politics in North Carolina, 1765–1789 (PhD thesis). Houston: Rice University.
