= Governor Nash =

Governor Nash may refer to:

- Abner Nash (1740–1786), 2nd Governor of North Carolina
- George K. Nash (1842–1904), 41st Governor of Ohio
