= Thomas Person =

American politician

- Born: January 19, 1733; Surry County, Colony of Virginia
- Died: November 16, 1800 (aged 67); Granville County, North Carolina
- Military career
- Allegiance: United States of America
- Branch: North Carolina Militia
- Service years: 1776–1783
- Rank: Brigadier general 1776–1800
- Unit: Hillsborough District Brigade of the North Carolina militia
- Commands: Hillsborough District Brigade of the North Carolina militia
- Conflicts: American Revolutionary War

Thomas Person (1733–1800) was an American politician, Anti-Federalist organizer, and brigadier general in command of the Hillsborough District Brigade of the North Carolina militia during the American Revolution.

== Early life ==
Born January 19, 1733 in the Colony of Virginia to William and Ann Person. He married his cousin, Johanna Philpot; the two had no children, and his nephew William Person Little was adopted as his heir. General Thomas Person spent most of his life in service to Granville County, North Carolina.

== Pre-Revolution career ==
In 1756, after several years working for Earl Granville as a surveyor, Thomas Person was recommended for the position of Justice of the Peace for Granville County. By the year 1762, he had become the county's sheriff.

After his election to represent Granville County in the Province of North Carolina House of Burgesses in 1764, Thomas Person would find himself on the side of the disaffected colonials in the War of the Regulation. When the Battle of Alamance ended in defeat for the Regulators, Governor William Tryon issued a series of amnesty proclamations for combatants and rioters, from which Thomas Person was specifically excluded, even though he was not present at the battle. Person was held for three weeks in Hillsborough but was eventually released without trial, due either to lack of evidence or his personal friendship with Edmund Fanning.

In spite of his issues with Governor Tryon, Representative Person continued to serve in the state General Assembly until the beginning of the American Revolution, when he was named to the extra-legal North Carolina Provincial Congress. This body would eventually "concur with the delegates of the other colonies in declaring independency."

== Revolutionary war service ==
On May 4, 1776, Person was commissioned a brigadier general in command of the Hillsborough District Brigade of the North Carolina militia. His service consisted mostly of raising troops and collecting supplies rather than fighting on the field, and he turned over command the following year to John Butler, who would lead the unit in the Battle of Guilford Court House. Person spent the rest of the war serving on the North Carolina Council of State.

== Anti-Federalist ==
After the war ended, Thomas Person became a leader of North Carolina's Anti-Federalists. They opposed the ratification of the United States Constitution on the grounds "that the Senate would become a bastion of aristocratic privilege, that an imperial president would overawe a complacent Congress, and that an intrusive federal court system would engender costly and oppressive litigation". Though there was broad support for the anti-federalists in North Carolina (outside of the wealthy coastal regions), the ratification by 11 of the other colonies and the formulation of the Bill of Rights made it clear that ratification was inevitable by the end of 1789. Nevertheless, at the Fayetteville Convention in 1789, Thomas Person would vote Nay.

== Later years ==
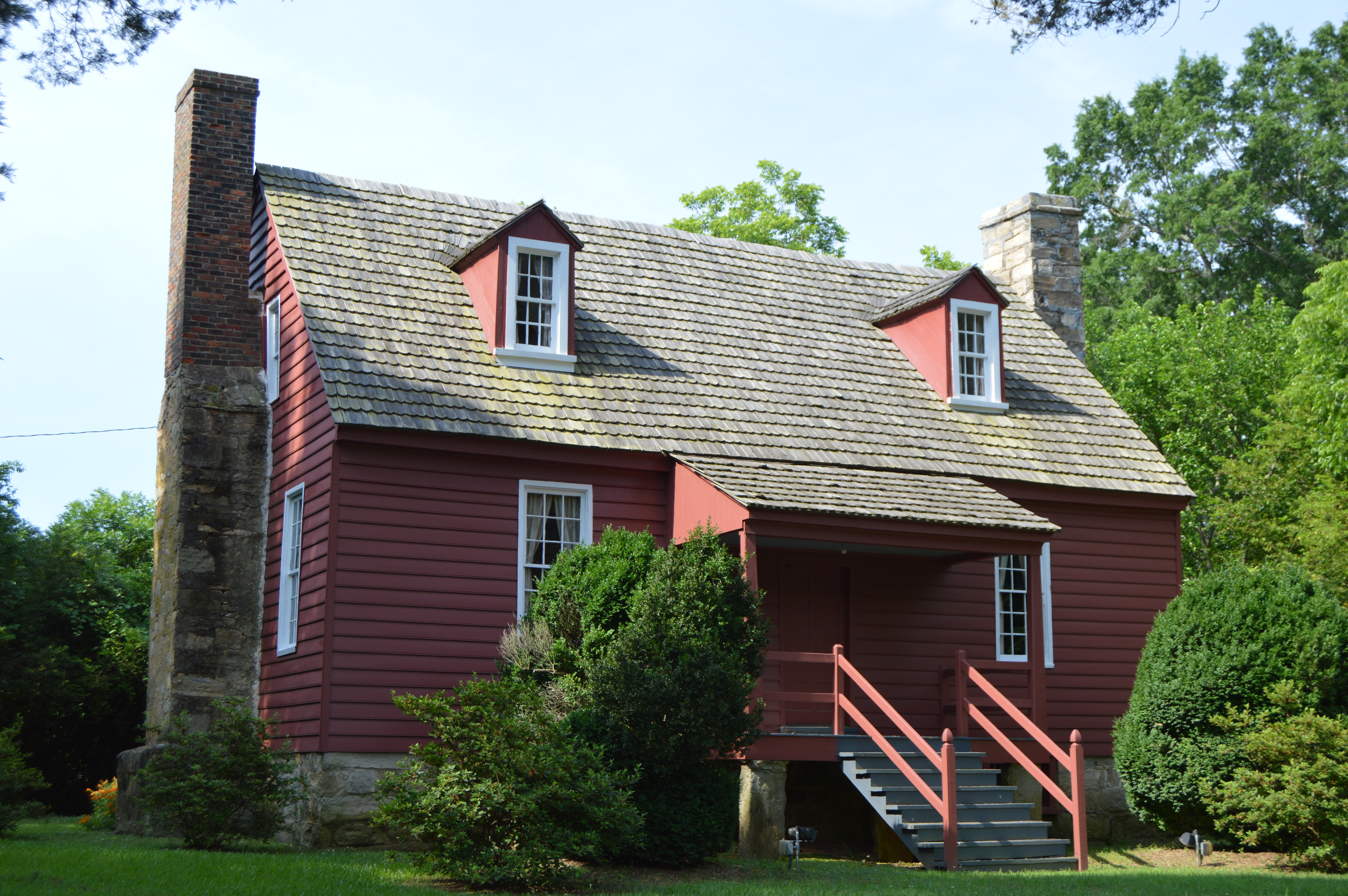
Person's Ordinary at Personton, now known as Littleton

General Person was an early supporter of the University of North Carolina at Chapel Hill. He granted them a gift of one thousand silver dollars to complete their chapel, which later bore his name. He sat on the inaugural Board of Trustees and is listed on the Memorial to Founding Trustees outside Person Hall which also bears his name.

When Caswell County was divided in 1791, the newly formed Person County was named in honor of General Thomas Person. He died on November 16, 1800, at the home of his sister, Patty Person Taylor. The Patty Person Taylor House was listed on the National Register of Historic Places in 1975.

By the time of his death in 1800, Thomas Person owned over 125 square miles of land in North Carolina and Tennessee. He also owned at least 34 slaves that he kept at his estate, Goshen, in Granville County, North Carolina. Person's Ordinary at Littleton, North Carolina, was listed on the National Register of Historic Places in 1973.
