= Battle of Lindley's Mill =

1781 battle of the American Revolutionary War

- Part of the American Revolutionary War
- A portion of Thomas Kitchin's 1781 map of North Carolina, depicting Hillsborough, the Haw River, and Lindley's Mill on Cane Creek (spelled here "Lindsey's M.")
Date	September 13, 1781
Location	Alamance County, North Carolina; east of present day Snow Camp, North Carolina 35.889711°N 79.347188°W
Result	British victory

Belligerents
United States	Great Britain

Commanders and leaders
(United States) John Butler (United States) Robert Mebane (United States) John Nall † (United States) William Barrett	(Kingdom of Great Britain) David Fanning + (Kingdom of Great Britain) Hector McNeill † (Kingdom of Great Britain) Archibald McDugald

Strength
300	600

Casualties and losses
24 killed 90 wounded 10 captured	27 killed 90 wounded

The Battle of Lindley's Mill (also known as the Battle of Cane Creek) took place in Orange County, North Carolina (now in Alamance County), on September 13, 1781, during the American Revolutionary War. It took its name from a mill that sat at the site of the battle on Cane Creek, which sat along a road connecting what was then the temporary state capital, Hillsborough, with Wilmington, North Carolina.

== Background ==
On September 12, 1781, loyalist militia under the command of militia colonels David Fanning and Hector McNeill captured Governor Thomas Burke and thirteen high-ranking Whig officials in a daylight raid on Hillsborough. The captured officials were to be transported down the road to Wilmington where they would be turned over to the British Army. Brigadier General John Butler, whose home was located nearby, and 300 patriot militiamen of the Hillsborough District Brigade set an ambush at Lindley’s Mill the next day.

== Battle ==
Lindley's Mill was located on Cane Creek, a tributary of the Haw River. Upon the Loyalist approach, the Patriot militia sprung their trap, surprising Fanning and his men. The loyalist forces were forced to ford Cane Creek in order to assault the patriot positions, which were on a plateau overlooking the creek. The elderly Hector McNeill, the commander of a unit of loyal Highlanders, was cut down early in the battle, leading the vanguard of Fanning's militia across the creek. The British failed to gain any ground against the Patriot position until Fanning and a larger company forded the creek upstream from Butler's position, and attacked the Patriot militia from their flank. This put the militia on the defensive, and the battle persisted for four hours until eventually Butler felt compelled to order his men to retreat due to casualties. In spite of Butler's order, a contingent of men attempted to continue holding their ground, but they were ultimately dislodged by Fanning.

== Deaths of Major Nall and Colonel McNeill ==
During the action at Lindley's Mills, Colonel McNeill and Major John Nall met in single combat. Both fired at the same instant, McNeill's ball striking Nall near the left pap while Nall's ball penetrated McNeill in the forehead; both died on the spot.

== Aftermath ==
Between 200 and 250 men were killed or wounded in the battle, with the Tory force suffering due to the loss of McNeill and serious wounds received by Fanning, who was forced to hide in the woods when his column moved on. Among those wounded was Dr. John Pyle, who had earlier commanded an ill-fated regiment of loyalist militia at Pyle's Massacre. After recovering from his wounds, Pyle helped to nurse many other wounded men, patriots and loyalists alike, back to health, for which service Governor Alexander Martin would later pardon Pyle's loyalist activities. The governor was not rescued by the patriots, and was successfully imprisoned on James Island. Historians have commented that the capture of Governor Burke and the defeat of the patriots only encouraged a growth in patriot sentiment.

== Memorials ==
There are four memorial stones placed near the battle site. Three of the stones are placed directly opposite of present-day Lindley Mills down a path through woods. One was dedicated in 1915, one in 2002, and one in an unknown year. The fourth monument is located in the cemetery across from Spring Meeting, a Friends meeting house.

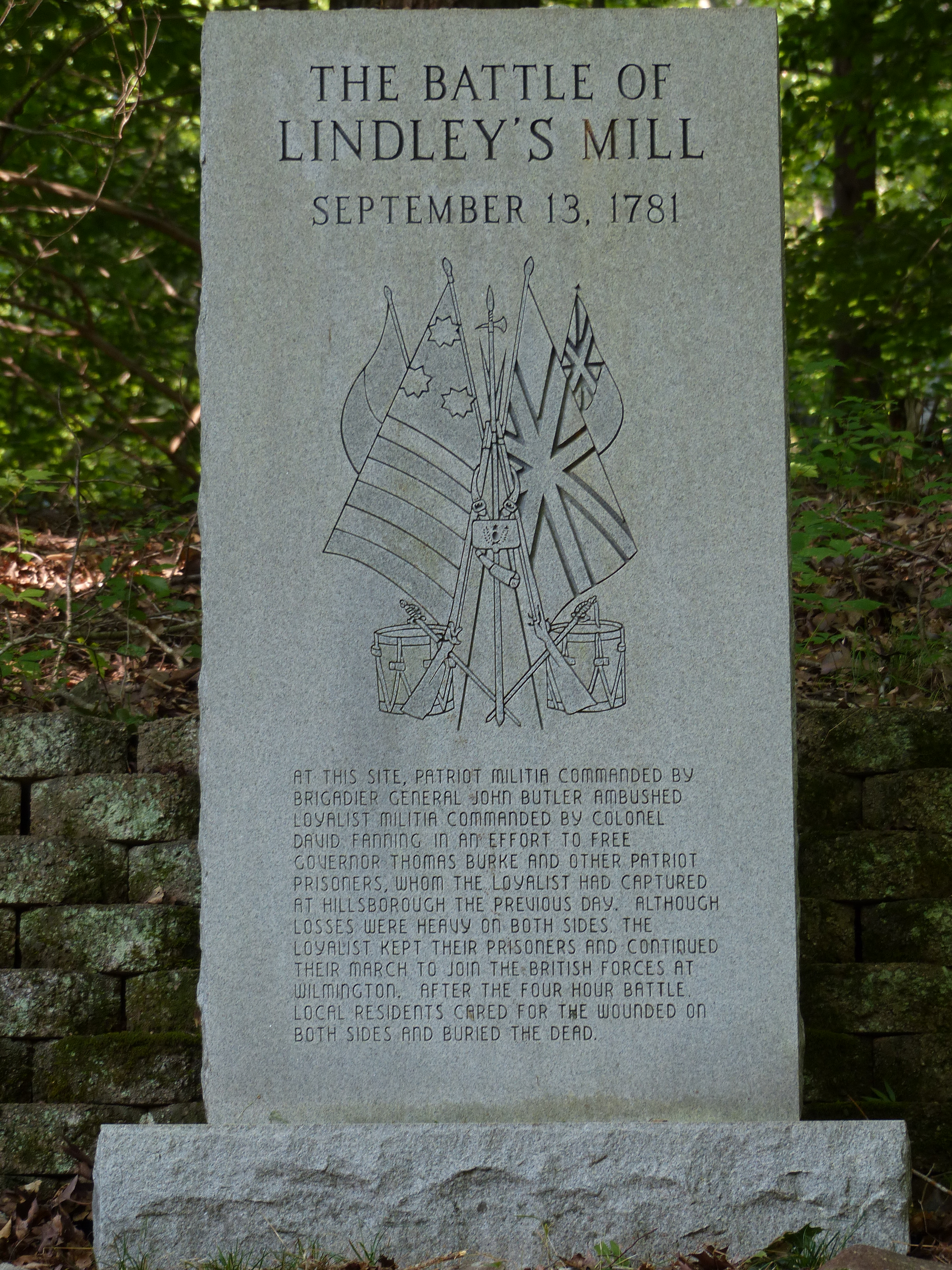
The primary memorial stone about five minutes' walk from present-day Lindley Mills.

== See also ==
- Friends Spring Meeting House
