= Ambrose Ramsey =

American politician

- Born: Unknown; Ireland
- Died: June 29, 1805; Chatham County, North Carolina, U.S.
- Burial place: Unknown
- Military career
- Allegiance: United States of America
- Branch: North Carolina Militia
- Service years: 1775–1783, 1784-1789
- Rank: Colonel, Brigadier General (Pro Tempore)
- Units: Chatham County Regiment, Salisbury District Brigade, Hillsborough District Brigade
- Commands: 1775-1783: Chatham County Regiment; March 15, 1781: Salisbury District Brigade; Hillsborough District Brigade: 1784-1789
- Conflicts: American Revolutionary War; Battle of Guilford Courthouse; Skirmish at Chatham County Court House

Ambrose Ramsey (died June 29, 1805) was native of Ireland, a member of the North Carolina senate eleven times, a large land holder and pioneer in Chatham County, North Carolina, Colonel and commander of the Chatham County Regiment of the North Carolina militia during the Revolutionary War from 1775 to 1783. He served as acting commander of the Salisbury District Brigade in 1781. He was captured by the British Loyalists at the Chatham Courthouse on July 17, 1781, and released on parole later in 1781. After the war, he was selected as brigadier general in charge of the Hillsborough District Brigade.

== Occupations ==
Ambrose Ramsey held the following positions:

- 1775, presiding justice of the Inferior Court of Please and Quarter Sessions of Chatham County, province of North Carolina; when independence from British rule in Chatham County was declared
- April 4, 1776, delegate to the Fourth Provincial Congress at Halifax. This Congress passed the Halifax Resolves.
- December 23, 1776, chosen as justice of Chatham County
- 1777–1781, 1783–1788, elected as State Senator eleven times to the North Carolina General Assembly
- Member of the Hillsborough District Committee of Safety member
- September 18, 1780, North Carolina War Board sent him an order to raise troops for the Chatham County militia
- July 16, 1781, captured by British Colonel David Fanning at Chatham Courthouse
- 1786, trustee of Pittsboro Academy
- July 25, 1788, delegate to North Carolina's Hillsborough Convention on the United States Constitution

Ramsey was twice an unsuccessful candidate for Congress in North Carolina's 4th congressional district, in 1792 as a Federalist and in a 1795 special election as a Democratic-Republican.

== Family ==
Ambrose had two brothers, John and Matthew Ramsey. John was a justice of Chatham County and also served as clerk of court. Matthew was a Captain of a Company of Light Horse during the Revolutionary War and also captured at Chatham Courthouse. He ran a mill on Rocky Creek, called Green's mill.

Ambrose ran a mill, Ramsey's Mill, that was located on the present site of the Lockville Dam, Canal and Powerhouse in Chatham County, North Carolina.

Ambrose died on June 29, 1805, in Chatham County.

== Additional Sources ==
- 1790 and 1800 Census, Chatham County, North Carolina
- 1779 Chatham County, North Carolina land records, granted 640 acres
