= Person's Ordinary =

- U.S. National Register of Historic Places
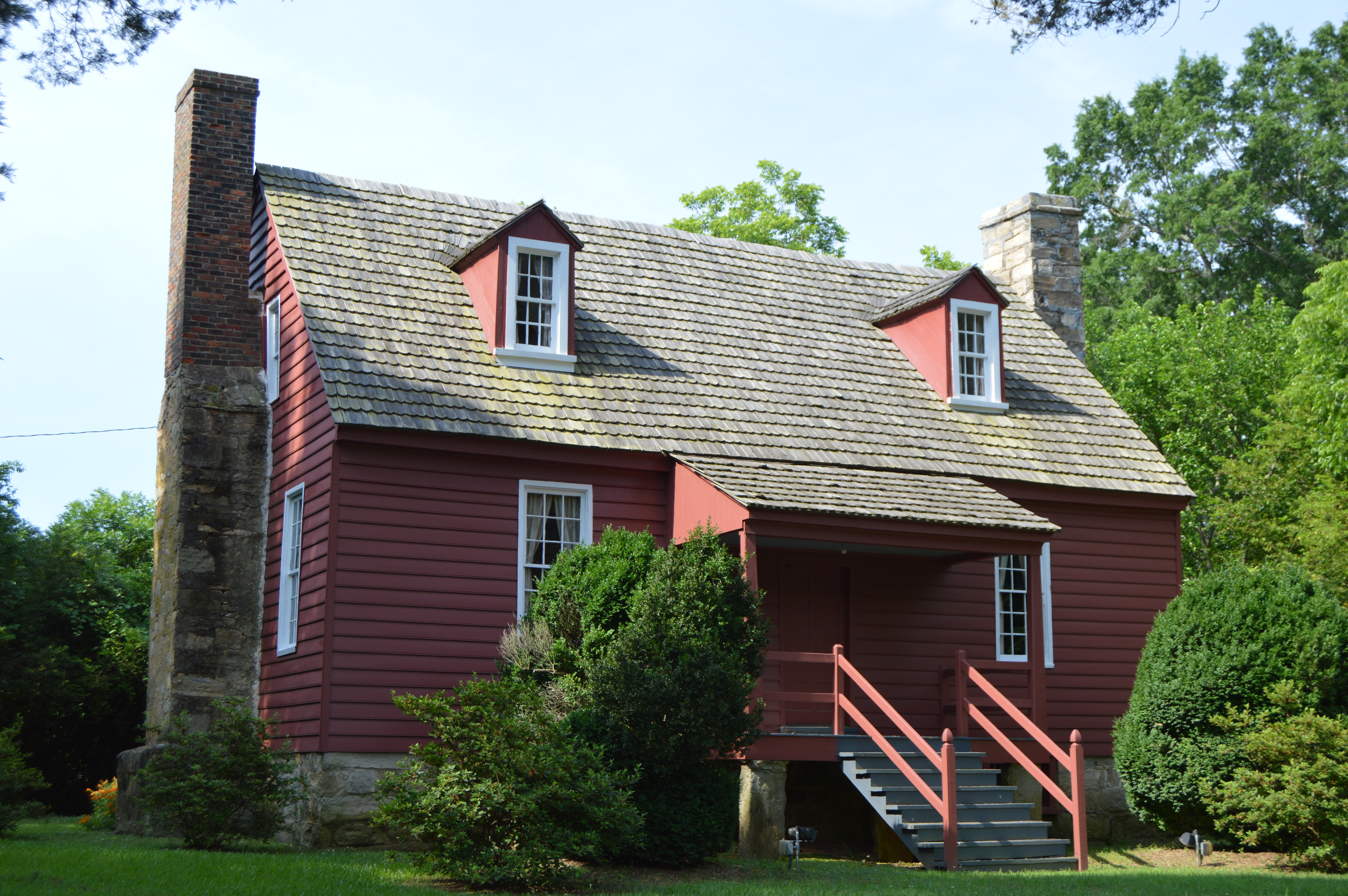
- Front and eastern side

- Location within North Carolina Location within the United States
- Location: 111 E Warren Street Littleton, North Carolina
- Coordinates: 36°25′52″N 77°54′54″W
- Area: less than one acre
- Architectural style: vernacular
- NRHP reference No.: 73001379
- Added to NRHP: April 24, 1973

Person's Ordinary is a historic inn and tavern located at Littleton, Halifax County, North Carolina. It dates to the mid- to late-18th century, and is a 1 1/2-story frame dwelling, three bays wide and two deep, with a massive exterior stone chimney at each end. It rests on a stone cellar, and has a modified Quaker plan. The building housed an inn and tavern for stagecoach travelers into the 1830s and is associated with Thomas Person, one of the state's most important political leaders from 1760 to 1790.

It was listed on the National Register of Historic Places in 1973.
