= William Barrett II =

North Carolina sheriff and politician

Capt. William Barrett II
- William Barrett II's tombstone

Member of the North Carolina General Assembly from Moore County
- In office 1806–1807
- In office 1798–1799
- In office 1792–1793

High Sheriff of Moore County
- In office 1790–1792

Justice of the Peace for Moore County
- In office 1784–1785

Personal details
- Born: Feb 1754 North Carolina, British North America
- Died: 1 March 1840 (aged 86) Moore County, North Carolina, United States
- Party: Anti-Federalist; Democratic-Republican
- Spouse: Ann Seawell
- Children: 11
- Occupation: Sheriff; Politician; Soldier

Military service
- Rank: Captain; Lieutenant
- Commands: Cumberland County Light Horse company, 3rd North Carolina Regiment, Continental Army
- Battles/wars: American Revolutionary War: Battle of Camden; Battle of Guilford Court House; Battle of Lindley's Mill

Captain William Barrett II was an American soldier, sheriff, politician, and Justice of the Peace from North Carolina who served in the American Revolutionary War, serving at the Battle of Guilford Court House and other engagements in the Southern theater of the American Revolutionary War.

== Early life & family ==
William Barrett II was born to William Barrett I and Patience Crouch in 1754. His parents had moved to North Carolina from Massachusetts. His paternal 4th great grandfather was Richard Warren the pilgrim who settled Plymouth, Massachusetts. Barrett married Ann Seawell and had 11 children.

== Military service ==
Barrett in his war pension recalled that he joined the military in 1779. He served under generals Richard Caswell, Horatio Gates, Nathanael Greene, and William Lee Davidson. Barrett commanded the Cumberland County Light Horse company of the 3rd NC Militia at the Battle of Guilford Court House and other engagements in North Carolina.

== Political career ==
Document showing Barrett winning election for High Sheriff

After the American Revolution he served as Justice of the Peace for Moore County. He then served as High Sheriff for the county and also as a representative for the county three times to the North Carolina General Assembly.

== Later life & death ==
Newspaper clipping showing an Advertisement for Barrett's fair

Barrett opened a gold mine in Moore County and the cite later became a site for public conventions like fairs. Barrett died in 1840.
