= House in the Horseshoe =

Historic house in North Carolina, United States

- Alston House
- U.S. National Register of Historic Places
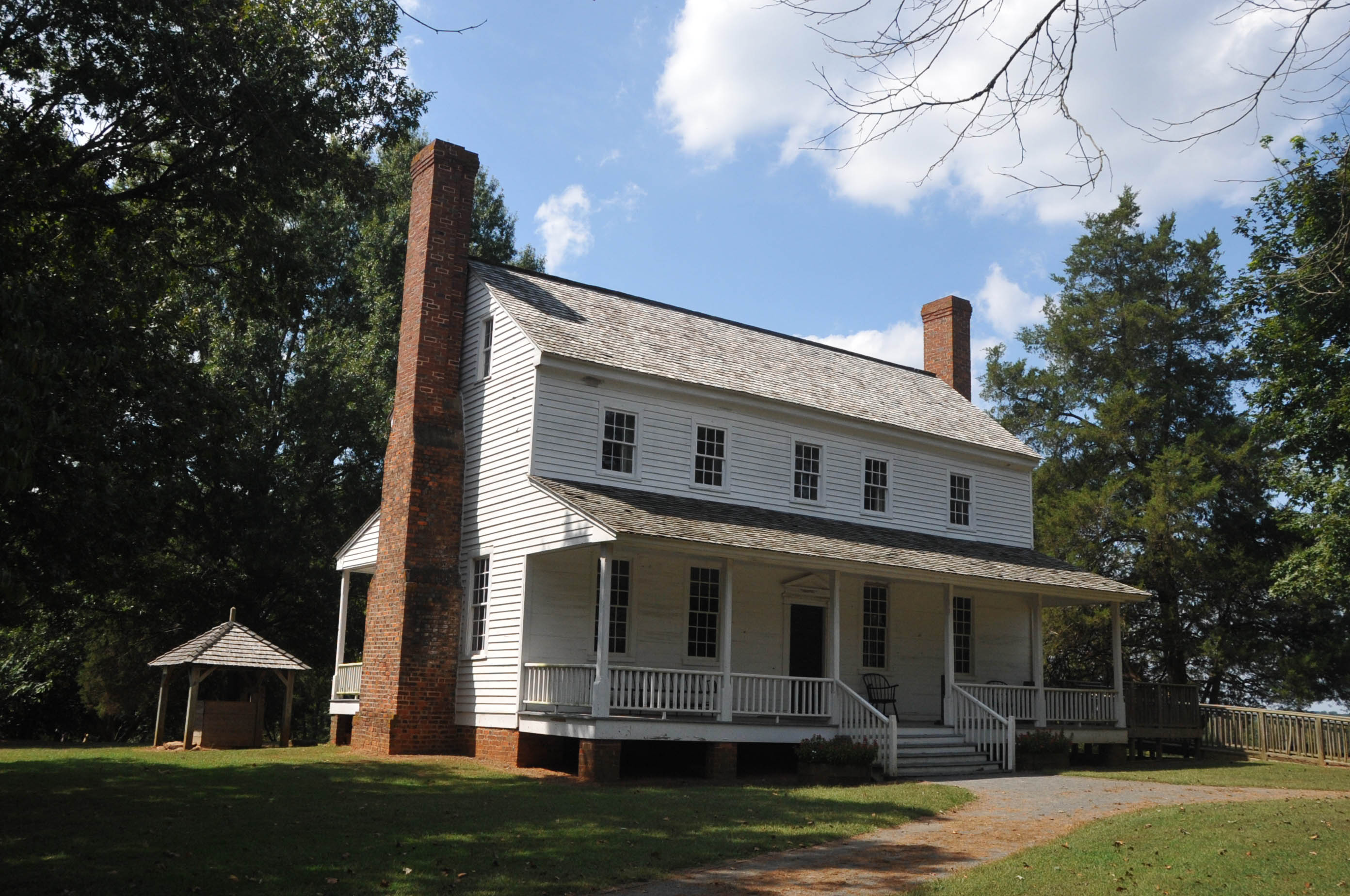

- Location within North Carolina Location within the United States
- Nearest city: Carthage, North Carolina
- Coordinates: 35°28′1.6″N 79°23′0.5″W
- Built: 1772
- Architect: Phillip Alston
- Architectural style: Coastal lowlands-style
- MPS: Moore County MRA (AD)
- NRHP reference No.: 70000462
- Added to NRHP: February 26, 1970

The House in the Horseshoe, also known as the Alston House, is a historic house in Glendon, North Carolina in Moore County, and a historic site managed by the North Carolina Department of Natural and Cultural Resources' Historic Sites division.

== History ==
The home, built in 1772 by Philip Alston, was the site of a battle between loyalists under the command of David Fanning and patriot militiamen under Alston's command on either July 29 or August 5, 1781 (the date being unclear in available records). The battle ended with Alston's surrender to Fanning, in which Alston's wife negotiated the terms with the loyalists.

In 1798, the home was sold to Benjamin Williams, who would become Governor of North Carolina from 1799 to 1802, and again in 1807–1808. Williams owned approximately 103 slaves and cultivated about 300 acres of cotton annually at the site of the house.

The Moore County Historical Association purchased the home in 1954, and ownership was then transferred to the state in 1955. The property was made a North Carolina Historic Site in 1971. It was added to the National Register of Historic Places in 1970. The property is now used as a museum and as the site of Revolutionary War reenactments and living history demonstrations each year.
