= Battle of the House in the Horseshoe =

1781 battle of the American Revolutionary War

Coordinates: 35.31°N 79.48°W

- Part of the American Revolutionary War
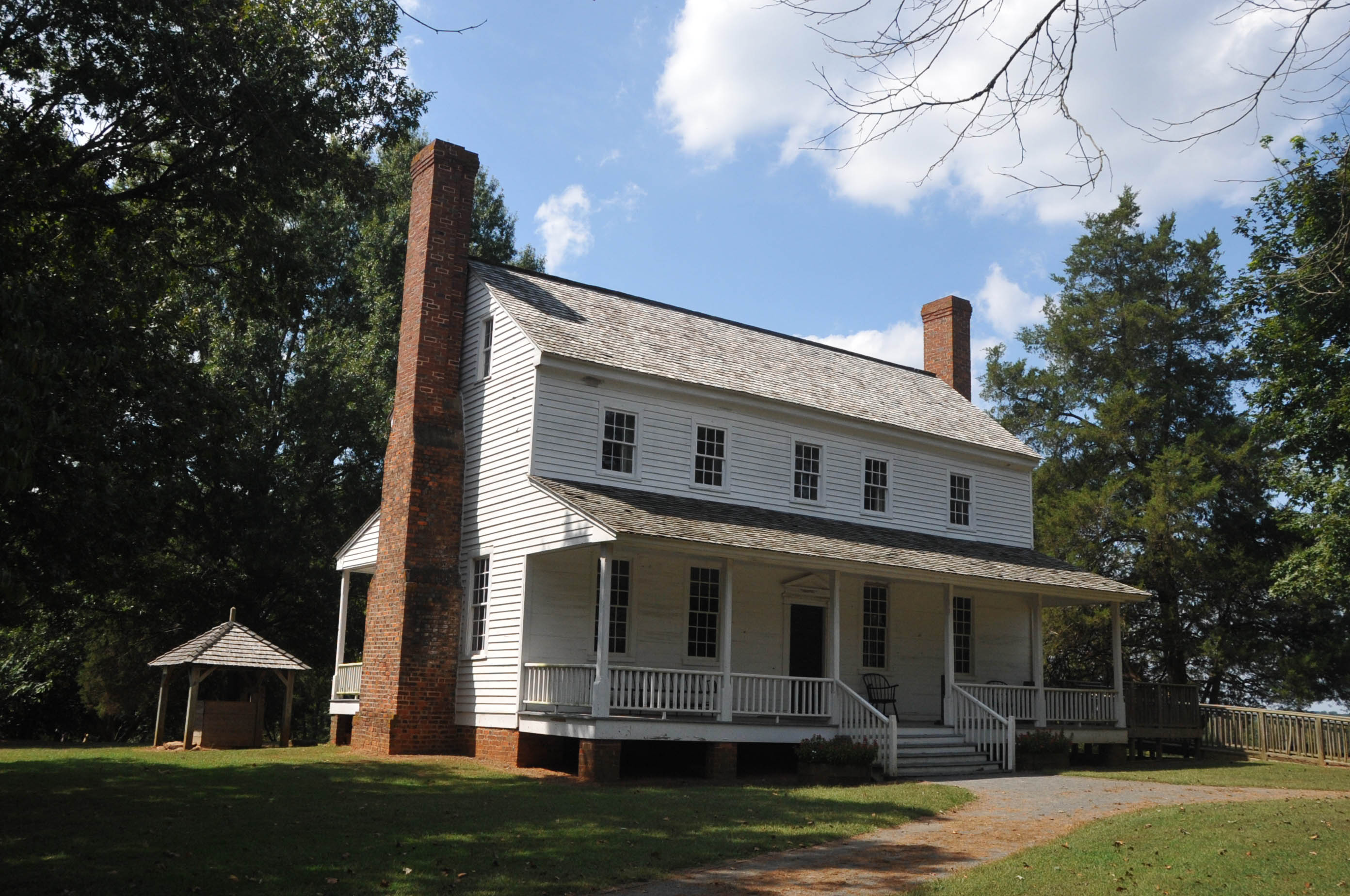
- The House in the Horseshoe photographed in 2007
Date	July 29 or August 5, 1781
Location	Moore County, North Carolina
Result	Loyalist victory

Belligerents
(Kingdom of Great Britain) Loyalist militia	(United States) Patriot militia

Commanders and leaders
(Kingdom of Great Britain) David Fanning	(United States) Phillip Alston

Strength
50	30

Casualties and losses
Total Losses: 12; 8 killed; 4 wounded	Total Losses: 22; 4 killed; 18 wounded

The Battle of the House in the Horseshoe was a minor engagement of the American Revolutionary War fought between Loyalist militia under the command of David Fanning and Patriot militia under the command of Phillip Alston, the owner of the House in the Horseshoe. The battle, which took place on either July 29 or August 5, 1781 (with July 29 being the most accepted date), ended in a victory for the Loyalists. The surrender terms between the combatants were negotiated by Alston's wife on behalf of the Patriots, and by Fanning for the Loyalists.
