= David Fanning (loyalist) =

Canadian politician

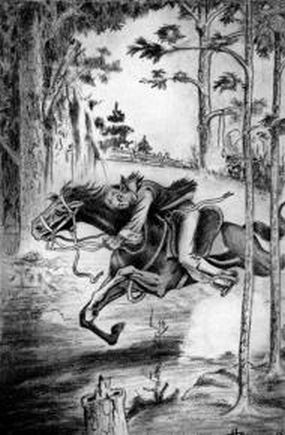
- Andrew Hunter the North Carolina Rebel on David Fanning’s horse, the Bay Doe, as he flees Fanning and Fanning’s men who were tying a noose to hang Hunter for demanding his natural rights be respected.

MLA for Kings County, New Brunswick
- In office 1791–1801

Personal details
- Born: c. 1755 Amelia County, Virginia
- Died: 14 March 1825 Digby, Nova Scotia
- Spouse: Sarah Carr
- Parent: David Fanning
- Occupation: farmer, author, army officer, politician

Military service
- Allegiance: (Kingdom of Great Britain) Great Britain
- Branch/service: British Army
- Years of service: 1775–1782
- Rank: Colonel
- Battles/wars: American Revolutionary War: Snow Campaign (1775); Battle of Great Cane Brake (1775); Battle of Cox's Mill (1781); Battle of the House in the Horseshoe (1781); Battle of Lindley's Mill (1781)

David Fanning (c. 1755 – 14 March 1825) was a Loyalist leader in the American Revolutionary War in North and South Carolina. Fanning participated in approximately 36 minor engagements and skirmishes, and in 1781, captured the Governor of North Carolina, Thomas Burke, from the temporary capital at Hillsborough. Additionally, Fanning was captured by Patriot forces 14 times throughout the war, each time escaping or receiving a pardon. After the British defeat in the war, Fanning fled to what is now Canada, where he was elected to the Legislative Assembly of New Brunswick from 1791 to 1801 representing Kings County. After being convicted of rape in 1801, Fanning was expelled from New Brunswick, and settled in Nova Scotia, where he lived the remainder of his life.

== Early life ==
Fanning was born 25 October 1755, in Amelia County, Virginia. His father was David Fanning, and he grew up in Johnston County, North Carolina. He developed a childhood scalp condition which, according to oral traditions collected by early North Carolina historian Eli Caruthers, resulted in long-term baldness. Fanning and his sister were orphaned in 1764 by the death of their father, and in 1773, David settled on a tributary of the Reedy River in South Carolina. At the onset of the American Revolutionary War, Fanning was also an officer in a local militia unit in the South Carolina upcountry. In 1775, that region leaned in favor of the Loyalists, and Fanning lent himself to that cause.

== American War of Independence ==
Fanning initially participated in the Snow Campaign of 1775, which proved to be a setback for the Loyalists in South Carolina. After a particular disaster at the Battle of Great Cane Brake on 22 December 1775, Fanning avoided capture by Patriot forces by taking refuge among the Cherokee nearby. Fanning was arrested by the Patriots one month later, which would prove to be the first of fourteen times he would be made a captive during the ensuing war. He managed to escape and flee again to the Cherokee, and was arrested three more times in North Carolina, each time being rescued by sympathetic forces. Fanning then returned home, and was subsequently arrested several more times before being acquitted at a treason trial in November 1777. At some point during this time, Fanning was harassed by Patriot sympathizers, and had trade goods stolen from him by them.

In March 1778, Loyalist activity again swelled in South Carolina, and Fanning raised a company of Loyalist militia which raided Patriot sympathizers on the Georgia border. After being wounded and nearly captured, Fanning accepted a pardon from South Carolina Governor John Rutledge in August 1779. After accepting the pardon, Fanning agreed to serve in the Patriot militia, but after the British success in the Siege of Charleston, Fanning took up the Loyalist banner once again and began recruiting men to his cause. After the Battle of Kings Mountain in October 1780, Fanning traveled to Chatham County, North Carolina, where he intended to recruit loyalist soldiers in anticipation of the British entry into that state. In February 1781, General Charles Cornwallis, 1st Marquess Cornwallis occupied Hillsborough, and Fanning was let loose against Patriot targets in the region, sparring with local Patriot militia, but not taking part in any substantial engagements.

After suffering a Pyrrhic victory at the Battle of Guilford Courthouse in March 1781, Cornwallis and the British Army were forced to march to Wilmington, leaving Fanning to recruit more Loyalist militia and stir up trouble in the North Carolina backcountry. Fanning asked for, and received a commission as a colonel of the Loyalist Militia in Randolph and Chatham counties on 5 July 1781. Fanning would often conduct raids with fewer than 12 men, and would capture and ransom or parole leading Patriot sympathizers and political figures. It has been estimated that he fought approximately 36 skirmishes during that year. Among these included a raid on a session of court in Chatham Courthouse, during which engagement Fanning took 53 prisoners, among them court officials, militia officers (including Colonel Ambrose Ramsey, and several members of the North Carolina General Assembly. Fanning was also the principal commander of the Loyalist militia involved in the battle at the House in the Horseshoe in the late summer of 1781, in which engagement Fanning forced the surrender of a force of Patriot militia. By the end of the summer of 1781, Fanning's infamy had attracted a force of approximately 950 Loyalist men to his command.

On 12 September 1781, Fanning commenced a daring morning raid on Hillsborough, North Carolina, where the Patriot government of that state was based at the time. Fanning was able to capture North Carolina Governor Thomas Burke, along with 200 other Patriot prisoners, and escaped on the way to Wilmington. Brigadier General John Butler, the commanding officer of the Hillsborough District Brigade of militia, was alerted of Burke's capture, and attempted to stop Fanning from continuing on to British-controlled Wilmington at the Battle of Lindley's Mill on 13 September. In that engagement, Fanning's militia, along with a unit of Highlanders commanded by Hector McNeill and Archibald McDugald, attempted to cross the Cane Creek, a tributary of the Haw River, and were surprised by Butler's men. Although Fanning had superior numbers with him, the battle lasted nearly four hours before Butler was dislodged from his position. Fanning was able to continue on to Wilmington, although suffering a grievous wound at Lindley's Mill, and delivered Burke to the British Army.

In January 1782, the larger course of the war had turned against the British, and Fanning found himself forced to request terms of surrender from his adversary, General Butler. In April 1782, he married Sarah Carr, and the two escaped to South Carolina. A legislative act in North Carolina in 1783 which granted pardons to former Loyalists specifically exempted Fanning from its terms, along with only two other men.

== Post-war political career and death ==
After the recognition of American independence, Fanning moved to Florida and then the Bahamas before settling in the newly created British colony of New Brunswick. Fanning was elected to the 2nd New Brunswick Legislative Assembly in 1791, although he was disliked by many of the more privileged former Loyalists of New Brunswick. Fanning represented Kings County, New Brunswick, until 1801. In 1800, he was accused of the rape of 15-year-old Sarah London, and was found guilty and sentenced to death despite his protests that the evidence against him was flawed. Fanning was pardoned but exiled from New Brunswick, and expelled from the provincial assembly. Fanning settled in Digby, Nova Scotia, where he owned several merchant ships, and later died in 1825. He left behind a daughter and two sons.

== Controversy ==
In 1790, Fanning wrote The Narrative of Colonel David Fanning, which would first see print in 1861 in Richmond, Virginia, then the capital of the Confederate States of America. North Carolina historian Samuel A'Court Ashe wrote that Fanning was "one of the most extraordinary men evolved by the Revolutionary War", but Fanning's calculated and sometimes brutal methods during that conflict have left him with a controversial legacy.
