= Battle of Cox's Mill =

1781 battle of the American Revolutionary War

- Part of American Revolutionary War
Date	June 8, 1781
Location	Near Ramseur, North Carolina
Result	Patriot victory

Belligerents
(Kingdom of Great Britain) Loyalist militia	(United States) Patriot militia

Commanders and leaders
David Fanning	John Collier

Strength
50 militia	160 militia

Casualties and losses
2 killed 6 wounded 6 captured	None killed Unknown wounded

The battle of Cox's Mill was fought between Patriot and Loyalist militias in Randolph County, North Carolina on June 8, 1781. Cox's Mill was the site of a base of operations for the Loyalists under the command of David Fanning. Loyalist scouts informed Fanning of a large force of 160 Patriots under John Collier who were about 10 miles away in pursuit of him. Fanning had decided to make a preemptive strike on the Patriot forces under the cover of darkness that night. Fanning's guide was captured and the Loyalists were discovered and fired upon by the Patriots. An exchange of fire was made between the two forces that lasted for 4 hours until the Loyalists withdrew to Deep River at dawn. Today a state historical marker can be seen along NC 22 denoting the Mill
