= John Hogan (North Carolina planter) =

American planter and politician

- Born: circa 1745; Prince William County, Virginia Colony
- Died: April 1810; Montgomery County, Tennessee
- Spouse: Mary Lloyd
- Military career
- Allegiance: United States of America
- Branch: North Carolina militia
- Service years: 1775-1776
- Rank: Colonel
- Unit: Orange County Regiment
- Commands: Orange County Regiment (1775-1776)
- Conflicts: Battle of Moore's Creek Bridge

Colonel John Hogan (1740 – April 1810) was an American planter and soldier from Orange County, North Carolina. He was a member of the North Carolina state senate in 1779.

== Early life ==
It is widely believed that John was born in Prince William County, Virginia. By 1770, he had married Mary Lloyd, daughter of Colonial Maj. Thomas Lloyd III (b. abt 1710, d. 1792) who had come to Orange Co, North Carolina in 1753 from Prince George County, Virginia. The couple settled in Orange County, North Carolina by 1772, and bought a farm near Chapel Hill, which is still owned by some members of the Hogan family.

== Career ==
On September 9, 1775, he was commissioned as colonel and commander of the Orange County Regiment, North Carolina militia. He served as chairman of the Orange County Committee of Safety in 1776. He was also Justice of the Peace in 1777, county trustee (Treasurer) in 1778, and Senator in the North Carolina General Assembly from Orange County in 1779. In 1792, he was one of several donors of 200 acres of land to insure siting of the University of North Carolina at Chapel Hill.

In 1793, he contracted to make the bricks to build what is now called 'Old East,' the oldest purpose-built state university building in the nation. His name is among those of the land donors on a large marble tablet prominently displayed in Memorial Hall at the University.

== Move west and death ==
In the fall of 1795, Col. Hogan moved west with his two married sons, Thomas and John, and his only known daughter, Margaret Lloyd (Hogan) Kimble, to Brush Creek, territory south of the Ohio River in Montgomery County, Tennessee. By 1798 he had purchased 1047 acres of land on Brush Creek and the Cumberland River. He is reported to have died in Montgomery County in April 1810. There is a memorial with his name on it at the New Hope Presbyterian Church Cemetery in Chapel Hill, North Carolina.
