= Orange County Regiment =

American colonial regiment

- Active: 1775-1783
- Allegiance: North Carolina
- Branch: North Carolina militia
- Type: infantry Militia
- Part of: Brigade

Commanders
- Notable commanders: Col John Hogan; Col John Butler; Col Alexander Mebane; Col Hugh Tinnen; Col William O'Neil

The Orange County Regiment was authorized on September 9, 1775, by the province of North Carolina Congress. On April 22, 1776, the unit was split into the Northern Orange County Regiment and the Southern Orange County Regiment, which retained most of the original men. Both regiments were subordinated to the Hillsborough District Brigade of militia on May 4, 1776. When the North Orange County Regiment was renamed the Caswell County Regiment on May 9, 1777, the Southern Orange County Regiment name reverted to the Orange County Regiment. The regiment was engaged in battles and skirmishes against the British during the American Revolution in North Carolina, South Carolina and Georgia between 1776 and 1782. It was active until the end of the war.

== Officers ==
Notable officers:

- Colonel John Hogan, (1775–1776)
- Colonel John Butler (1776–1777)
  - Lt. Colonel in the Orange County Regiment of militia (1775–1776)
  - Colonel over the Southern Orange County Regiment of militia (1776–1777)
  - Brigadier General of the Hillsborough District Brigade of militia (1777–1783)
- Colonel Alexander Mebane (1777–1780)
  - Colonel in the Southern Orange County Regiment of militia (1776–1777)
  - Colonel over the Orange County Regiment of militia (1777–1780)
  - Commissary General for the State of North Carolina, with the rank of Brigadier General (1780–1783)
- Colonel Hugh Tinnen (sometimes Tinnon) (2nd colonel, 1779–1783)
  - Captain in the Hillsborough District Minutemen (1775–1776)
  - Major in the Southern Orange County Regiment of militia (1776–1777)
  - Lt. Colonel in the Orange County Regiment of militia (1777–1779)
  - Colonel in the Orange County Regiment of Militia (1779–1783)
- Colonel William O'Neal (2nd colonel, 1780–1783)
  - Captain in the Southern Orange County Regiment of Militia (1776–1777)
  - Captain in the Orange County Regiment of Militia - 1777–1779
  - Major in the Orange County Regiment of Militia - 1779–1780
  - Colonel in the Orange County Regiment of Militia - 1780–1783

== Known engagements ==
See Engagements for known engagements during the American Revolution.

== See also ==
- List of American Revolutionary War battles
- Salisbury District Brigade
- Southern Campaigns: Pension Transactions for a description of the transcription effort by Will Graves
- Southern theater of the American Revolutionary War
- North Carolina Online history resource. "Orange County Inhabitants Petition Governor Tryon, signed by John Butler and Alexander Mebane".
