= Gary A. Kowalski =

American Unitarian Universalist and author (born 1953)

Gary A. Kowalski (born 1953) is an American Unitarian Universalist and author noted for his books on ecospirituality, science, history, and animal welfare.

== Career ==
A graduate of Harvard College and the Harvard Divinity School, Kowalski was the senior minister of Burlington's First Unitarian Universalist Society for over 20 years. While there, he performed about 25 marriage ceremonies each year, including same-sex marriages because Kowalski said that the church should support all long-term, mutually committed relationships. He also served on the Vermont State Advisory Panel to the United States Commission on Civil Rights. He is a past president of Unitarian Universalists for Ethical Treatment of Animals and served on the board of Green Mountain Animal Defenders.

In the summer of 2010, Kowalski left Burlington and moved to Santa Fe, New Mexico, to begin a 12-month interim ministry for the Unitarian Universalist congregation there. In the following year he became interim minister at the First Parish Unitarian Universalist Church of Sudbury, Massachusetts and subsequently served parishes in Worcester, Massachusetts and Chapel Hill, North Carolina. In retirement, he serves as a volunteer firefighter/emergency medical responder for Hondo Fire & Rescue in Santa Fe, New Mexico.

He is the author of eight books including The Souls of Animals (New World Library) (1991), Science and the Search for God (Lantern Books), Goodbye Friend: Healing Wisdom For Anyone Who Has Ever Lost A Pet (New World Library), Blessings of the Animals: Celebrating Our Kinship With All Creation and The Bible According To Noah: Theology As If Animals Mattered (Lantern Books), Earth Day (a children's book), and Green Mountain Spring and Other Leaps of Faith, both from Skinner House Books.

In his 2008, volume Revolutionary Spirits: The Enlightened Faith of America's Founding Fathers (BlueBridge Publishing), Kowalski sought to show that the Founding Fathers of the United States were neither devout Christians nor secularists but that their views combined religion with the new scientific and intellectual discoveries of the Enlightenment.

== Selected publications ==
- The Souls of Animals (1991)
- Goodbye Friend: Healing Wisdom For Anyone Who Has Ever Lost A Pet (1997)
- The Bible According To Noah: Theology As If Animals Mattered (2001)
- Science and the Search for God (2003)
