= Alexander Martin =

American Founding Father and politician

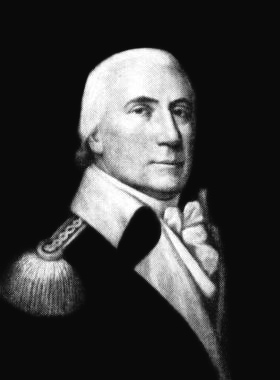

United States Senator from North Carolina
- In office March 4, 1793 – March 4, 1799
- Preceded by: Samuel Johnston
- Succeeded by: Jesse Franklin

4th & 7th Governor of North Carolina
- In office December 17, 1789 – December 14, 1792
- Preceded by: Samuel Johnston
- Succeeded by: Richard Dobbs Spaight
- In office April 22, 1782 – May 13, 1785
- Preceded by: Thomas Burke
- Succeeded by: Richard Caswell

Acting Governor of North Carolina
- In office September 13, 1781 – January 16, 1782
- Preceded by: Thomas Burke
- Succeeded by: Thomas Burke

Speaker of the North Carolina Senate
- In office 1781–1782, 1785, 1787–1788, 1805

Member of the North Carolina Senate
- In office 1778–1782, 1785, 1787–1788,
- Constituency: Guilford County, North Carolina
- In office 1804–1805
- Constituency: Rockingham County, North Carolina

Personal details
- Born: October 17, 1740 Hunterdon County, New Jersey, British America
- Died: November 2, 1807 (aged 67) Rockingham County, North Carolina, U.S.
- Party: Anti-Administration Party

Military service
- Allegiance: United States
- Branch/service: Continental Army
- Years of service: 1775–1777
- Rank: Colonel
- Commands: 2nd North Carolina Regiment
- Battles/wars: Revolutionary War: Battle of Germantown

Alexander Martin (October 17, 1740 – November 2, 1807) was a Founding Father of the United States, framer of the U.S. Constitution, fourth and seventh Governor of North Carolina, and an infantry officer in the American Revolutionary War. In private life, Martin was a lawyer, merchant, planter, and slave owner.

== Early life and education ==
Born in Hunterdon County in the Province of New Jersey in 1740 to James Hugh Martin and Jane Hunter of Ireland, Governor Alexander Martin was a North Carolinian politician and delegate to the Federal Constitutional Convention. Aside from his role in the Constitutional Convention, Martin witnessed several significant chapters in colonial and early U.S. history, including the Regulator Rebellion, the Revolutionary War, and the North Carolina ratification debates.

Martin held bachelor's and master's degrees from the College of New Jersey (now Princeton University), making him one of the most erudite delegates to the Constitutional Convention. After graduating from Princeton, Martin moved to Salisbury, North Carolina. There he worked first as a merchant and later as an attorney. As his legal career took shape, the Regulator Rebellion began. On September 24, 1770, angry Regulators took over the Hillsboro Court. When their demonstration spilled onto the streets of Hillsboro, several lawyers, including Martin, who likely was serving as a justice of the peace, were whipped and beaten.

== Revolutionary War ==
By 1774, Martin had become a judge of the Salisbury District. When the American Revolutionary War began, he was commissioned as a lieutenant colonel (September 1, 1775) under Colonel Robert Howe. He was promoted to colonel (April 10, 1776) over the 2nd North Carolina Regiment when Colonel Howe was promoted to Brigadier General. The regiment was initially part of the North Carolina State troops and joined George Washington's Continental Army on November 28, 1775. In October 1777, at the Battle of Germantown, thick fog caused Martin and the soldiers under his command to mistake British troops for Continental soldiers. After this debacle, Martin faced a court-martial for cowardice. Though not convicted, Martin resigned from the army due to stress and poor health on November 22, 1777.

In 1778, Martin was elected to the North Carolina Senate while still recuperating from his military service. His tenure in the Senate was eventful: he served as president of the Senate's Board of War and, in 1781, became acting governor of North Carolina when the sitting governor, Thomas Burke, was kidnapped by Tories. In 1782, the General Assembly elected Martin governor of North Carolina. While the cessation of hostilities had eliminated the gravest threat to North Carolina, the end of the Revolution posed many challenges, the most pressing of which was how to treat Tory and Loyalist property. Martin resisted popular pressure to confiscate and redistribute this property, instead advocating its return to all except for North Carolina's more infamous Tories.

After Martin's gubernatorial term ended, he returned to the General Assembly, where he once again became the speaker of the Senate. In 1787, the General Assembly elected him as a delegate to the Federal Constitutional Convention in Philadelphia, where the difficulties of the U.S. government under the Articles of Confederation would be weighed. Martin arrived in Philadelphia before the start of the convention and stayed until late August, a few weeks before the convention's close. He played little public role in the debates there and was not appointed to any of the convention's committees. He seconded several minor motions, none of which profoundly affected the course of the convention. Because Martin left the Federal Convention early, he did not sign the Constitution.

In 1788, Martin sought election to the Hillsborough Constitutional Convention, where North Carolina would consider ratifying the Constitution. A proponent of the Federal Constitution, Martin was helpless in the face of a wave of Anti-Federalist sentiment in North Carolina. Delegates were selected county by county, and Martin, who lived in the predominantly Anti-Federalist Guilford County, ran at a disadvantage. His opponent in the election – the Anti-Federalist Presbyterian minister David Caldwell – won a seat, as did four of his congregation. Martin was the only delegate to the Federal Convention who sought election to a state convention and lost.

== Later life ==
At some point in the early 1780s, Martin began a life-long affair with Elizabeth (Lewis) Strong, the widow of Thomas Strong of Virginia. After her husband's death, Elizabeth settled near her family in Guilford County. She became the mistress of Governor Martin sometime after. Their only known child, Alexander Strong Martin, was born July 1787, and by 1789 she and their natural son were residents in Martin's Danbury estate in Rockingham County, based on census records. Governor Martin recognized Alexander Strong Martin as his son in his will, his only known child.

In 1797, Martin was elected as a member of the American Philosophical Society.

Martin's failure in Guilford County did not reflect any loss of popularity in the General Assembly. He was again elected governor in 1789 and held office until 1792, when he reached the term limit. During his second gubernatorial tenure, a permanent seat of the North Carolina government, named Raleigh, was founded in Wake County. Moreover, Martin established the University of North Carolina in 1789.

Immediately after Martin left the governor's seat, he joined the U.S. Senate. His legislative record in the 1790s indicates that Martin's political views were nuanced. Though he had supported the ratification of the Federal Constitution and had always run for election as a Federalist, he repeatedly voted against the Federalists in the 1790s. His convictions appear to have become more Federalist amid the XYZ Affair, and he voted for all of the Alien and Sedition Acts.

In 1799, Martin, having lost the support of North Carolina Federalists, was voted out of the Senate. He returned to the North Carolina General Assembly in 1804, and in 1805 again became Speaker of the North Carolina Senate. He died in 1807.

Political offices
Preceded by Thomas Burke	Governor of North Carolina; 1782–1784	Succeeded by Richard Caswell
Preceded by Samuel Johnston	Governor of North Carolina; 1789–1792	Succeeded by Richard Dobbs Spaight
U.S. Senate
Preceded by Samuel Johnston	U.S. senator (Class 2) from North Carolina; March 4, 1793 – March 4, 1799; Served alongside: Benjamin Hawkins, Timothy Bloodworth	Succeeded by Jesse Franklin
