= Thomas Burke (North Carolina politician) =

American politician

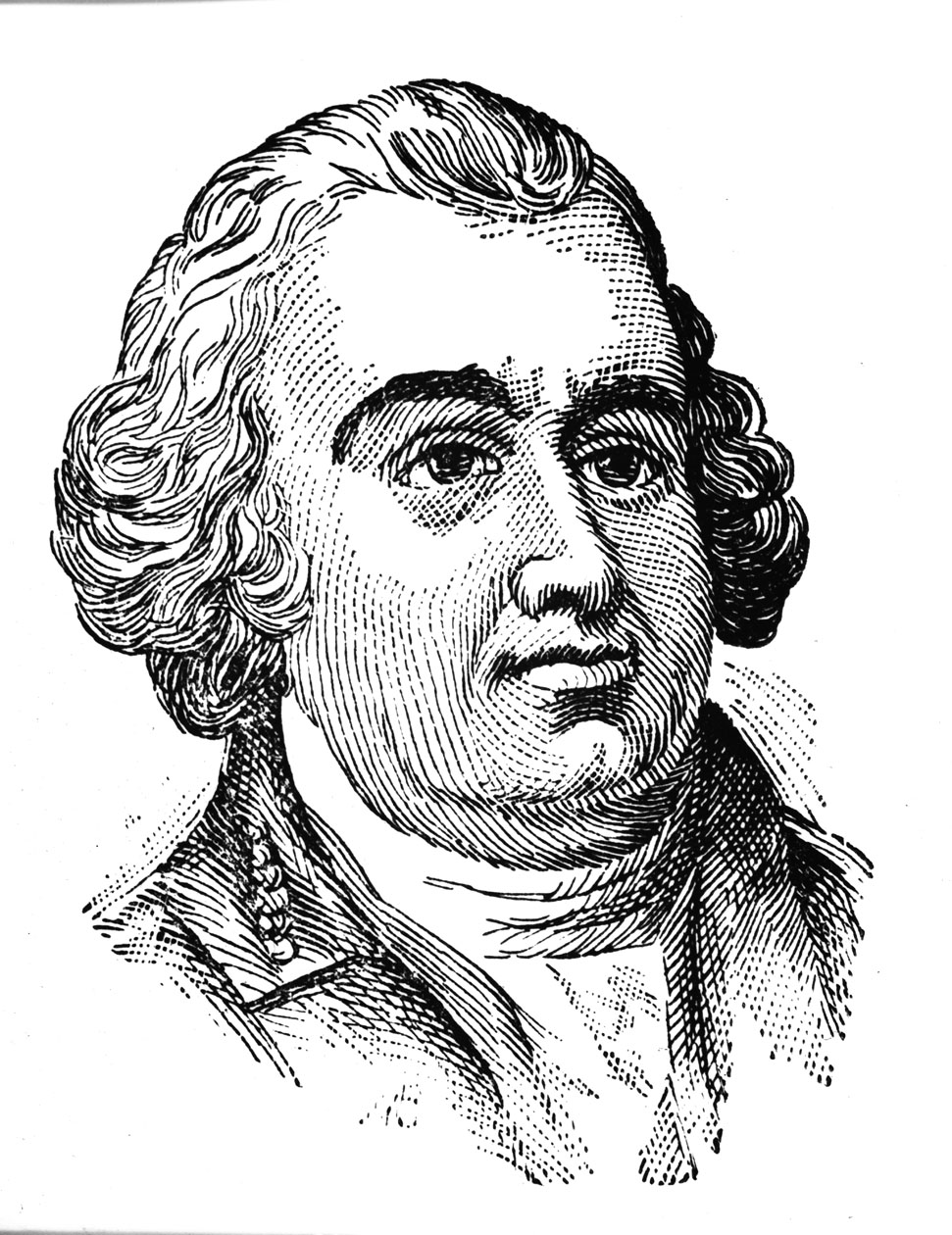

Governor of North Carolina
- In office June 26, 1781 – April 22, 1782
- Preceded by: Abner Nash
- Succeeded by: Alexander Martin

Personal details
- Born: Thomas Burke ca. 1747 County Galway, Kingdom of Ireland
- Died: December 2, 1783 (aged 35–36) Orange County, North Carolina, U.S.
- Spouse: Mary Freeman Doherty

Thomas Burke (circa 1747 – December 2, 1783) was an Irish physician, lawyer, and statesman who lived in Hillsborough, North Carolina. He represented North Carolina as a delegate to the Continental Congress and was the third governor of the state. Burke was claimed to have been a practising Roman Catholic, which would make him the first of two governors of North Carolina who were Catholic. (Note: The other is Mike Easley, who won election in 2000.)

== Biography ==
Burke was born in Tiaquin, County Galway, Ireland, around 1747. By 1764, he had emigrated. Thomas went to Virginia and practiced medicine for several years. He studied law and began his practice in Norfolk, Virginia. He became an early supporter of the American Revolution, writing tracts in opposition to the Stamp Act. In 1774, he moved to Hillsborough, North Carolina.

Burke's neighbors made him a member of the Fifth North Carolina Provincial Congress that met in Halifax in 1776. He participated in the debate that led to North Carolina's new constitution. He was chosen as a delegate to the Second Continental Congress on December 20, 1776, and arrived in Philadelphia to take his seat on February 4, 1777. He was a strong states' rights advocate, although he moderated this view somewhat by 1781. In September 1777, most of Congress prepared to flee Philadelphia as the British advanced. Burke, instead, went to join General Nash's North Carolina troops defending the city. He was present at the Battle of Brandywine before rejoining the Congress.

Burke served in Congress until 1781, when he was chosen to be governor of North Carolina. He returned home to assume that office in June. As governor, he actively supported and encouraged the militia in its resistance to British and Loyalist forces. Then, in September, he was captured by Tories under the command of Col. David Fanning. After a failed rescue attempt by patriot militia under the command of John Butler at the Battle of Lindley's Mill, Burke was imprisoned by the British on James Island near Charleston, South Carolina.

Burke was allowed to live freely on the island under parole, but he was subject to mistreatment and deplorable conditions and feared assassination. Finally, on January 16, 1782, he escaped and went to North Carolina. He wrote to the British that he still considered himself under the terms of his parole. He resumed his duties as governor before being released from parole through an exchange. Accordingly, many North Carolinians and Continental officers considered that he had broken his word and remained under a cloud of dishonor. In April 1782, he did not stand for re-election to the governorship and was succeeded by Alexander Martin.

Burke's health never recovered from his term of imprisonment. He retired to his home, known as Tyaquin, in Orange County. He died there on December 2, 1783, and was buried on his plantation near Hillsborough. The gravesite is about 350 feet north of what is now Governor Burke Road.

Burke was claimed to have been a practicing Roman Catholic who succeeded politically in an era when Catholics held little political power and were often discriminated against.

== Namesakes ==
Burke County, North Carolina, is named for him.

== See also ==
- List of United States governors born outside the United States

== Notes ==
Political offices
Preceded by Abner Nash	Governor of North Carolina; 1781–1782	Succeeded by Alexander Martin
