= Samuel Johnston =

American politician (1733–1816)

- Portrait miniature by James Peale, c. 1793

United States Senator from North Carolina
- In office November 26, 1789 – March 4, 1793
- Preceded by: None
- Succeeded by: Alexander Martin

6th Governor of North Carolina
- In office December 20, 1787 – December 17, 1789
- Preceded by: Richard Caswell
- Succeeded by: Alexander Martin

1st and 3rd Grand Master of the Masons of North Carolina
- In office 1787–1788
- Preceded by: Office established
- Succeeded by: Richard Caswell
- In office 1789–1792
- Preceded by: Richard Caswell
- Succeeded by: William Richardson Davie

Acting Governor of North Carolina
- In office 1775
- Monarch: George III
- Preceded by: Josiah Martin
- Succeeded by: Richard Caswell

Personal details
- Born: December 15, 1733 Dundee, Scotland
- Died: August 17, 1816 (aged 82) Edenton, North Carolina, U.S.
- Party: Federalist
- Relations: Gabriel Johnston (uncle)

Samuel Johnston (December 15, 1733 – August 17, 1816) was an American planter, lawyer, grand master of Freemasons, slave holder, and statesman from Chowan County, North Carolina. He represented North Carolina in both the Continental Congress and the United States Senate, and he was the sixth governor of North Carolina.

== Early life and education revolution ==
Johnston was born in Dundee, Scotland, in the Kingdom of Great Britain, on December 15, 1733. In 1736, he accompanied his father, Samuel Sr., in relocating to Onslow County, in what was then colonial-era Province of North Carolina. Samuel Sr. became surveyor-general of the colony. Young Samuel was educated in New England, and then read law in Carolina. He moved to Chowan County and started a plantation known as Hayes near Edenton.

== Career ==
Johnston was admitted to the bar and began a law practice in Edenton. In 1759, he was elected to the North Carolina House of Burgesses and served in that body until it was displaced in 1775 during the American Revolution. During North Carolina's War of the Regulation in December 1770, he introduced the anti-Regulators bill was later passed as the Johnston Riot Act in response to the September 1770 Hillsborough Riot and to later reports of a planned Regulator march upon the provincial capital, New Bern, which ultimately did not occur. The passage of the Johnston Riot Act and others precipitated an even more significant enlargement of the Regulator movement and forced Royal Governor Tryon to call out the provincial militia, which culminated in the Battle of Alamance on May 16, 1771. As a strong supporter of independence, he was also elected as a delegate to the first four provincial congresses and presided over the Third and Fourth congresses in 1775 and 1776. After Royal Governor Josiah Martin abdicated in 1775, he was the highest-ranking official in the state until Richard Caswell was elected president of the Fifth Provincial Congress.

Johnston is frequently cited as having served in the North Carolina Senate in 1779, but that is not confirmed in Senate Journals. He may have been elected, but he certainly did not attend. In Johnston's own words, after 1777, "...had nothing to do with public business..." during the Revolution. Under the new state government, Johnston was elected to the North Carolina Senate in 1783 and 1784.

Johnston was the first Grand Master of Freemasons for the State of North Carolina, voted into office on 11 Dec 1787 to revive Masonic activities that had been defunct after breaking away from England. There had only been Deputy Grand Master until he was elected Grand Master. He would be elected Grand Master again in 1789-1791.

== Election as president ==
North Carolina sent Johnston as a delegate to the Continental Congress in 1780 and 1781. Johnston was elected the first President of the United States in Congress Assembled under the Articles of Confederation, but he declined the office. This was reported on July 10, 1781:

Mr. [Samuel] Johnston having declined to accept the office of President, and offered such reasons as were satisfactory, the House proceeded to another election; and, the ballots being taken, the hon. Thomas McKean was elected.

== Later career and death ==
Johnston served as Governor of North Carolina from 1787 to 1789. He presided over both conventions called to ratify the US Constitution. The one in 1788 rejected the Constitution despite Johnston's strong support. He called another convention in 1789, which decided on ratification. Johnston then resigned as governor to become one of the state's first two US Senators and served from 1789 to 1793. In 1800, he was made a Judge in the Superior Court of North Carolina, an office he held until his retirement in 1803.

Johnston died at his home, Hayes Plantation, near Edenton, in Chowan County; he purchased the house from David Rieusett in 1765 and lived there until 1793 when he moved to the Hermitage, a plantation in Martin County. The 1790 Census shows that he enslaved 96 people at Hayes Plantation. In 1816 he was buried in the Johnston Burial Ground there. The plantation house is privately owned but was designated a National Historic Landmark in 1973. It is now within Edenton, but the current house was completed by his son, James Cathcart Johnston, a year after Samuel's death.

== Legacy ==
Samuel Johnston's collection of books, which he bequeathed to his son James, is preserved in a full-scale replication of Hayes Plantation's library at the University of North Carolina at Chapel Hill. The octagon-shaped historic room is on permanent exhibit in the North Carolina Collection Gallery in Wilson Library.

In 1983, a copy of the Declaration of Independence once belonging to Johnston was found on the Hayes Farm; in 2024 a copy of The Constitution of the United States was found.

== See also ==
- List of United States governors born outside the United States

Political offices
| Preceded by Richard Caswell | Governor of North Carolina; 1787–1789 | Succeeded by Alexander Martin |
U.S. Senate
| Preceded by None | U.S. senator (Class 3) from North Carolina; November 26, 1789 – March 4, 1793; Served alongside: Benjamin Hawkins | Succeeded by Alexander Martin |
