= Abner Nash =

American politician

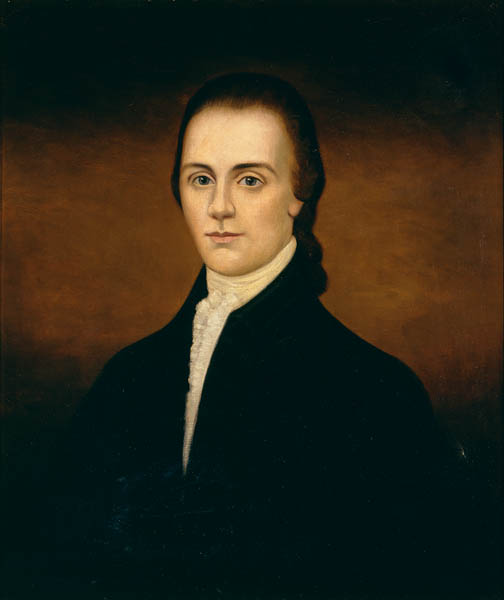
- Portrait, 1908–1909

2nd Governor of North Carolina
- In office April 20, 1780 – June 26, 1781
- Preceded by: Richard Caswell
- Succeeded by: Thomas Burke

Personal details
- Born: August 8, 1740 Prince Edward County, Colony of Virginia, British America
- Died: December 2, 1786 (aged 46) New York City, U.S.
- Party: None

Military service
- Battles/wars: War of the Regulation; Battle of Alamance

Abner Nash (August 8, 1740 – December 2, 1786) was an American politician who served as the second governor of North Carolina from 1780 to 1781 and as a member of the Continental Congress from 1782 until his death.

== Life story ==
Nash was born the son of Col. John Nash and Anne Owen at "Templeton Manor" Plantation in Prince Edward County in the Colony of Virginia. He read law and was admitted to the bar in Virginia. He also began his political career there, serving in the House of Burgesses from 1761 to 1765 before moving to New Bern, North Carolina. He married the widow of former colonial governor Arthur Dobbs.

Nash was an active supporter of the revolutionary cause. He represented New Bern in the rebel "provincial congress" assembled from 1774, and in 1776 was a member of the committee that drafted the state's new constitution. He became a member of the North Carolina House of Commons in 1777 (serving as the first Speaker of that house) and the North Carolina State Senate in 1779.

He was elected governor by the legislature in 1780. During his brief tenure as governor, North Carolina saw some of its worst conflicts as a battleground in the American Revolutionary War. Unlike his brother Francis, his temper and poor health were poorly suited to the needs of war. This brought him into difficulty with the legislature. The assembly appointed Richard Caswell as commander-in-chief (Major General) of the North Carolina militia and state troops, even though the constitution assigned this responsibility to the governor. Then in December 1780, they named a Council Extraordinary that further encroached on his office. Consequently, Nash resigned and went home in the spring of 1781. Thomas Burke was named to replace him.

== Death ==
Later in 1782, North Carolina eased political tensions by sending Nash as a delegate to the Continental Congress. He would serve there the rest of his life, as he died at a session in New York City. Abner was initially buried in St. Paul's Churchyard in Manhattan, but his body was later returned for burial in a private, family plot in Craven County, North Carolina.

== Family ==
His son, Frederick Nash, was also a lawyer and political leader. He would serve as Chief Justice of the North Carolina Supreme Court. Another descendant, Frederic, would later become a famous poet by his middle name, Ogden Nash.

Political offices
Preceded by Richard Caswell	Governor of North Carolina; 1780–1781	Succeeded by Thomas Burke
