= Battle of Guilford Court House order of battle =

The following units and commanders fought at the Battle of Guilford Court House on March 15, 1781.

== Abbreviations used ==
=== Military rank ===
- LTG = Lieutenant General
- MG = Major General
- BG = Brigadier General
- Col = Colonel
- Ltc = Lieutenant Colonel
- Maj = Major
- Cpt = Captain

== Other ==
- (w) = wounded
- (mw) = mortally wounded
- (k) = killed in action

== British forces ==
LTG Charles, Earl Cornwallis
MG Alexander Leslie, second in command

Brigade	Regiments and Others
Right Wing MG Alexander Leslie	1st Guards Battalion: Ltc Chapple Norton; 2nd Battalion, 71st Regiment of Foot, Fraser's Highlanders: Cpt Robert Hutcheson; Regiment von Bose: Maj Johann Christian du Buy
Left Wing Ltc James Webster (mw)	23rd Regiment of Foot: Cpt Thomas Peter; 33rd Regiment of Foot: Ltc James Webster (mw), Cpt James Campbell; Light Infantry Company (Guards): Cpt William Maynard (w); Ansbach-Bayreuth Jäger Company: Cpt Friedrich Wilhelm von Röder
Reserve BG Charles O'Hara (w); Ltc James Stuart (k); BG Charles O'Hara	2nd Guards Battalion: Ltc James Stuart (k); Grenadier Guards Company
Cavalry Ltc Banastre Tarleton (w)	British Legion
Royal Artillery Lt John Macleod	1 (or 2) six-pounders; 2 three-pounders

== American forces ==
MG Nathanael Greene
BG Isaac Huger, second in command (w)

Division	Brigade	Regiments and Others
Continentals	Maryland Brigade Col Otho Williams	1st Maryland Regiment: Col John Gunby (w), Ltc John Eager Howard; 2nd Maryland Regiment: Ltc Benjamin Ford
Continentals	Virginia Brigade BG Isaac Huger (w)	Campbell's Virginia Battalion: Ltc Richard Campbell; Green’s Virginia Battalion: Col John Green; Hawes' (formerly Buford's) Virginia Battalion: Ltc Samuel Hawes
Continentals	Independent Continental units	1st and 3rd Continental Light Dragoons: Ltc William Washington; Lee's Legion: Ltc Henry Lee; 1st Continental Artillery Regiment: Cpt Anthony Singleton, Cpt Ebenezer Finley (2 batteries of 2 six-pounders); Delaware Company: Cpt Robert Kirkwood; Wallace's Virginia Light Infantry Company: Cpt Andrew Wallace (k), Lt Reuben Long; Huffman's Virginia Light Infantry Company (cooperated with Kirkwood's Company): Lt Philip Huffman (k)
North Carolina Militia	Hillsborough District Brigade BG John Butler	Randolph County Regiment: Ltc James Dougan (7 companies); Chatham County Regiment: (2 companies); Wake County Regiment: (2 companies): Col Thomas Wooten; Bladen County Regiment (detached from Wilmington District Brigade: Lt. Col. James Richardson (3 companies); Cumberland County Regiment (detached from Wilmington District Brigade (2 companies); Duplin County Regiment (detached from Wilmington District Brigade (1 company)
North Carolina Militia	Salisbury District Brigade BG Ambrose Ramsey	Surry County Rifles: Col Martin Armstrong (3 companies); Surry County Regiment: Col Joseph Williams (12 companies); Rowan County Regiment: Col Francis Locke Sr. (8 companies); Mecklenburg County Regiment Col Francis Locke Sr., Detachment (8 companies); Wilkes County Regiment: Ltc James Miller, Detachment (3 companies); Lincoln County Regiment: Maj John Carruth, Detachment (6 companies); Rutherford County Regiment: Ltc James Miller Detachment (2 companies); Burke County Regiment Detachment; Washington County Regiment: Ltc Charles Robertson Detachment (3 companies); Anson County Regiment: Col Hicks and Col William Lofton (2 companies); Guilford County 1st Regiment: Col James Martin (13 companies) and 2nd Regiments: Col John Peasely (13 companies)
North Carolina Militia	Halifax District Brigade BG Thomas Eaton	Jones County Regiment (detached from New Bern District Brigade: (1 company); Nash County Regiment (detached from New Bern District Brigade): Lt Col William Linton (6 companies); Johnston County Regiment (detached from New Bern District): Col William Bryan (1 company); Hyde County Regiment (detached from Edenton county regiment); Camden County Regiment (detached from Edenton District Brigade): (1 company); Gates County Regiment (detached from Edenton District Brigade): (1 company); Martin County Regiment: Col Whitmell Hill (7 companies); Northampton County Regiment: Col Andrew Haynes (2 companies); Halifax County Regiment: Col Pinketham Eaton (8 companies); Edgecombe County Regiment: Ltc John Eaton (3 companies); Franklin County Regiment: Col Benjamin Williams (5 companies); Warren County Regiment: Col Herbert Haynes (6 companies); Botetourt County Riflemen: Col Charles Lynch (10 companies)
North Carolina Militia	Other	North Carolina cavalry: Cpt Charles-François Sevelinges, Marquis de Bretigney
Virginia Militia	First Virginia Brigade BG Edward Stevens (w)	Militia regiment: Col Samuel McDowell; Militia regiment: Col George Moffet; Militia regiment: Col Nathaniel Cocke; Militia regiment: Col Peter Perkins
Virginia Militia	Second Virginia Brigade BG Robert Lawson	Militia regiment: Col Robert Munford; Militia regiment: Col John Holcombe; Militia regiment: Col Beverly Randolph
Virginia Militia	Rifle units	Campbell’s Virginia Rifle Corps: Col William Campbell; Lynch’s Virginia Rifle Corps: Col Charles Lynch; Virginia Rifle Corps
