= List of North Carolina militia units in the American Revolution =

North Carolina militia units in the American Revolution

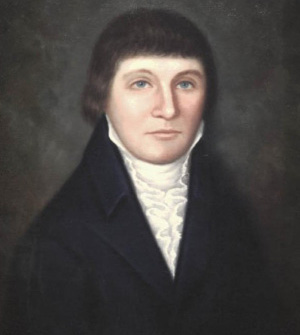
MG Richard Caswell, New Bern District Brigade and North Carolina Militia commander (Note: General Richard Caswell was the commander of the New Bern District Brigade, as well as 2nd and 4th North Carolina Militia commander.)

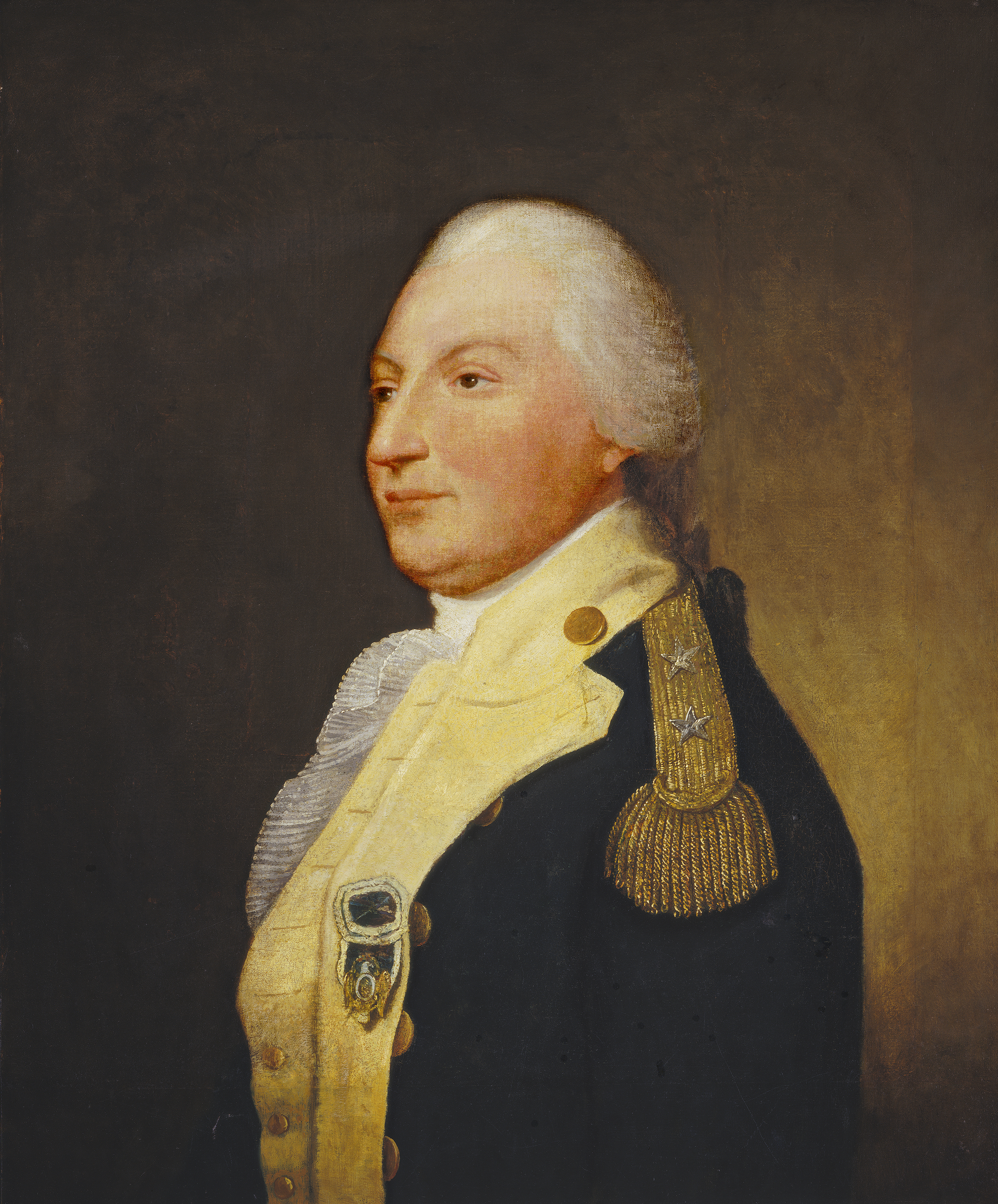
MG William Smallwood, 2nd North Carolina Militia commander (Note: MG Smallwood was a Continental Army officer from Maryland. He briefly commanded the North Carolina militia in 1780 and early 1781. He was unpopular and was replaced by MG Richard Caswell.)

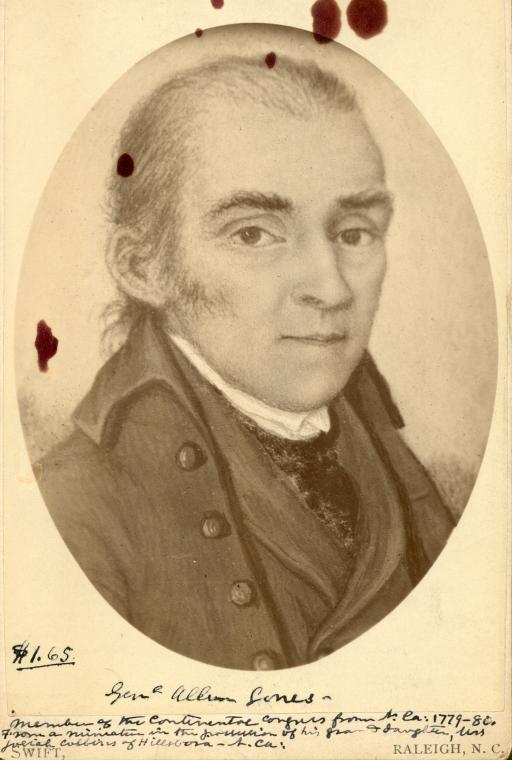
BG Allen Jones, Halifax District Brigade commander

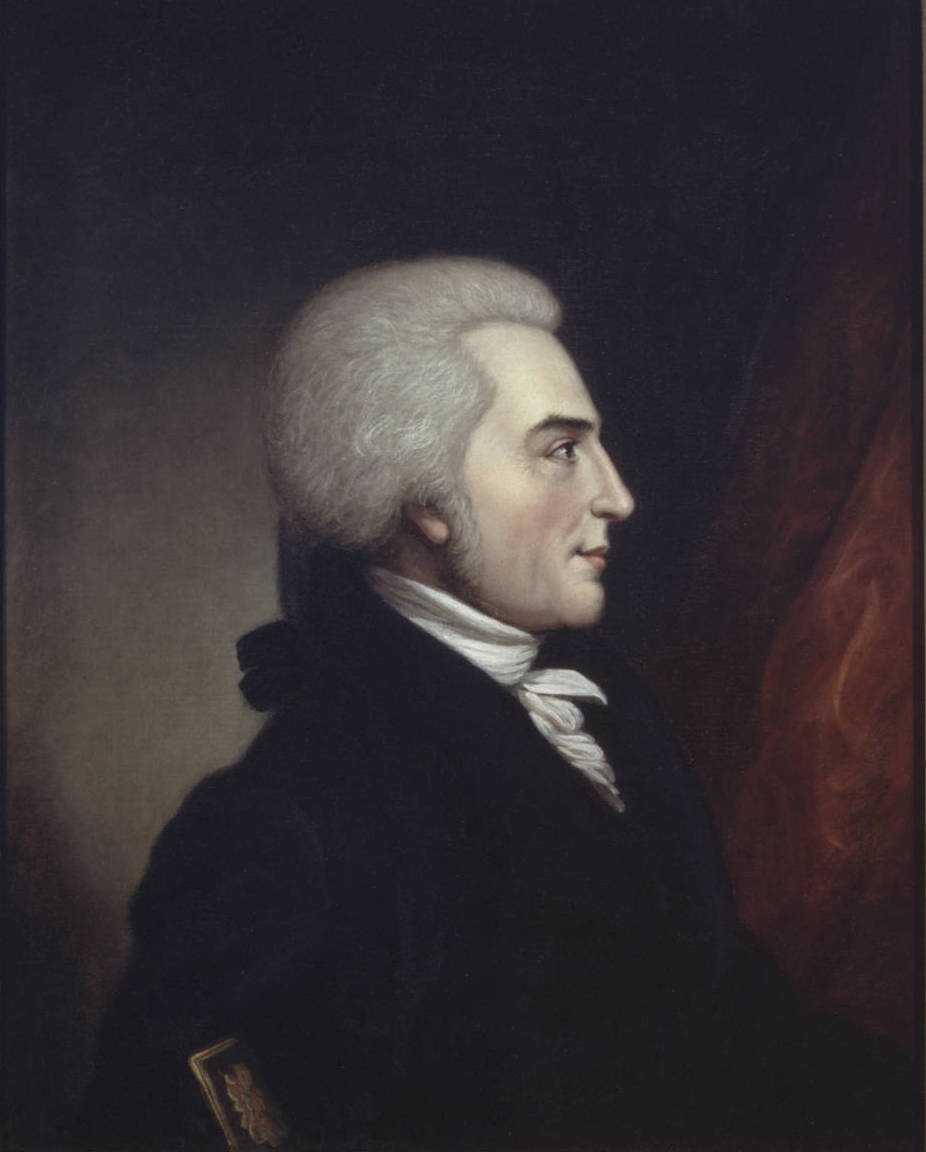
Col William Richardson Davie, Independent Corps of Light Horse commander

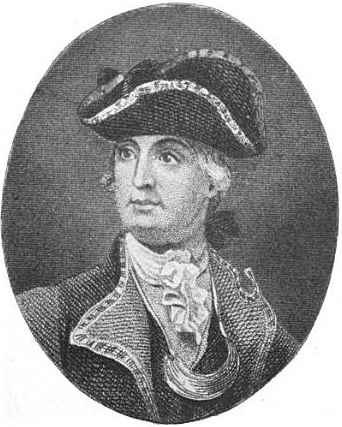
Col Robert Howe, Brunswick County Regiment commander

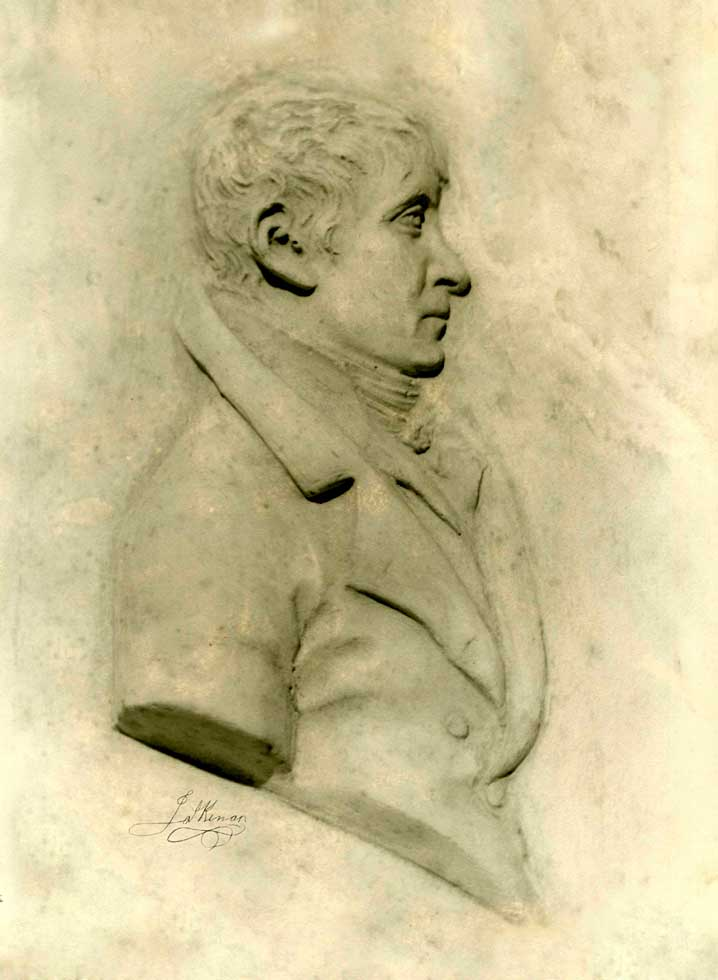
Col James Kenan, Duplin County Regiment commander

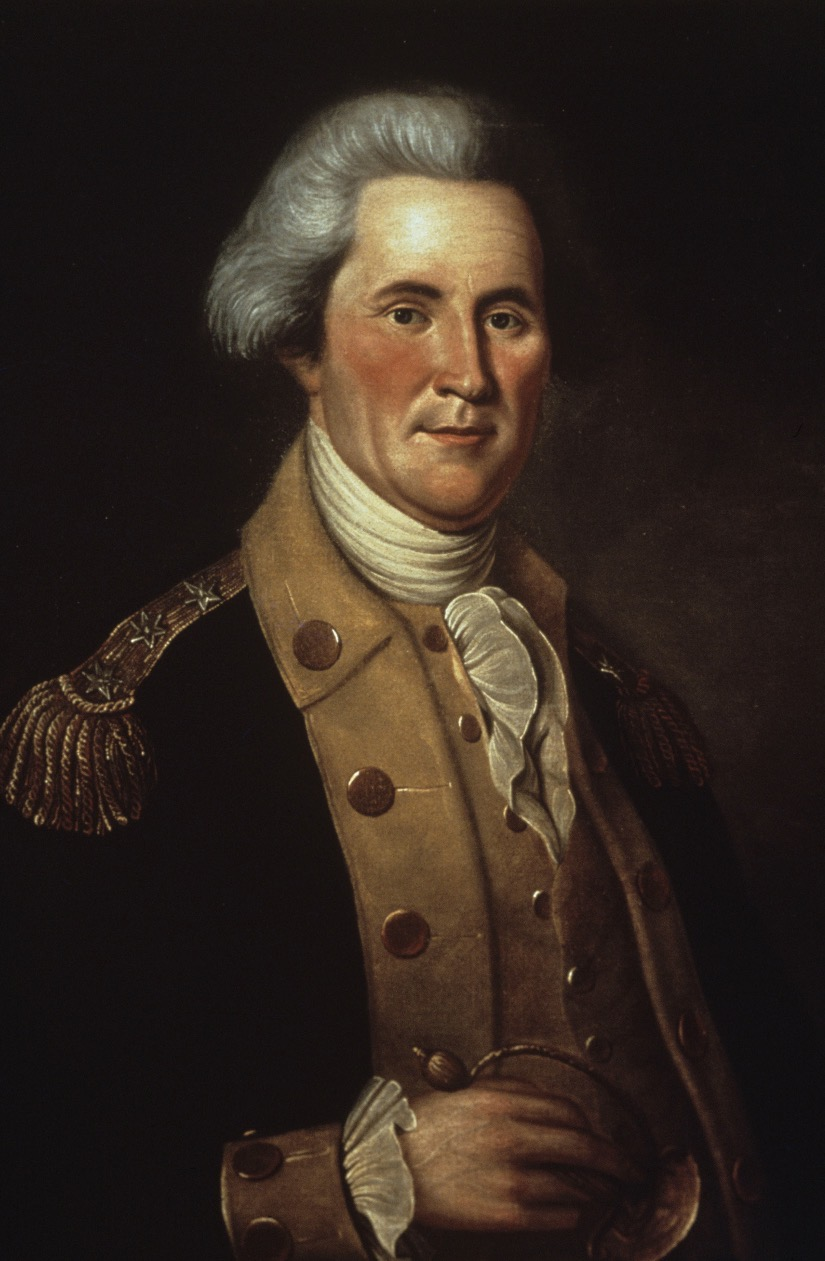
Col John Sevier, 3rd commander of the Washington County Regiment

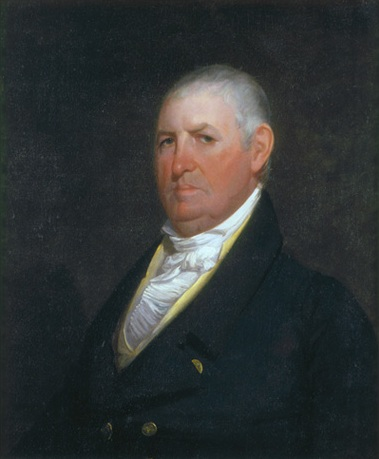
Col Isaac Shelby, Sullivan County Regiment commander

LTC William Polk, Polk's Regiment of Light Dragoons commander

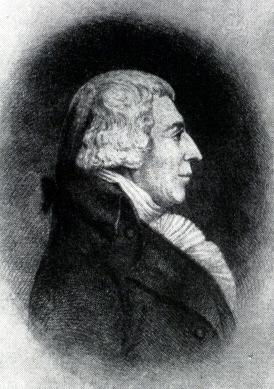
LTC Richard Dobbs Spaight of the Craven County Regiment

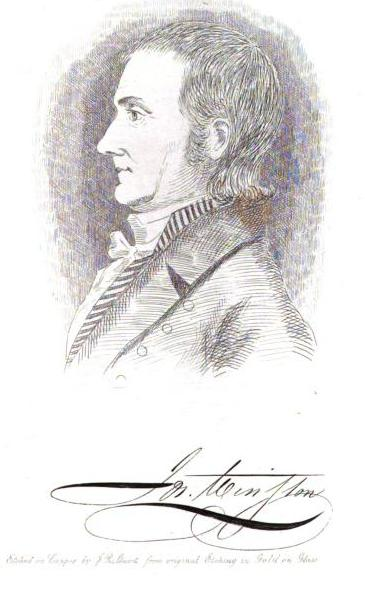
LTC Joseph Winston of the Surry County Regiment

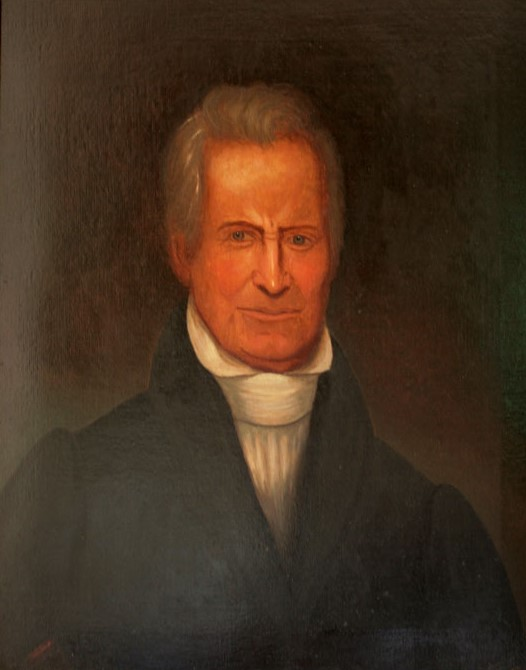
Maj Joseph Graham of the Lincoln County Regiment

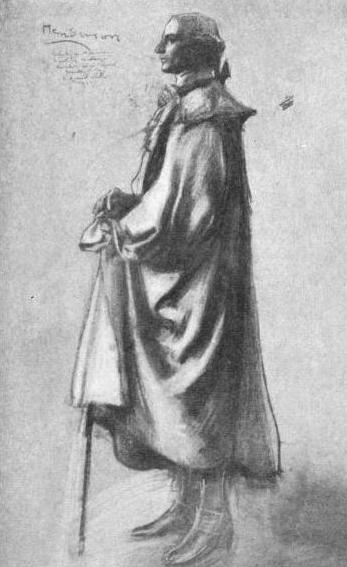
CPT Richard Henderson of the Granville County Regiment

The North Carolina militia units were first established in 1775 by the Third North Carolina Provincial Congress on the eve of the American Revolution. Initially, the militia units were centered on the 35 counties that then existed in the Province of North Carolina. The units fought against the British, Loyalists, and Cherokee Native Americans that aligned themselves with British forces. The units included military district brigades established in 1776, county regiments, four battalions, and one independent corps of light horse. Four regiments were located in counties that became part of the Southwest Territory in 1790 and later Tennessee in 1796. The size of brigades could be up to a few thousand volunteers. Brigades were commanded by a brigadier general. Regiments were commanded by a colonel and made up of a number of companies commanded by captains with about 50 men in each company. During engagements, one or more companies of regiments may have been involved in actions and commanded by the regimental or brigade commander. In 1778, Major General John Ashe was selected to command all North Carolina militia and State Troops. Brigade commanders reported to him. Separate from the North Carolina militia, the state provided 10 numbered regiments to the Continental Army that were referred to as the North Carolina Line.

== Background ==
In August 1775, the Third North Carolina Provincial Congress of North Carolina delegates appointed Cornelius Harnett the head of the Council of Safety which oversaw resistance to British rule. They also divided the colony into six military districts for the purpose of organizing militia and arranging representation in the executive body of the Council of Safety. At the county level, there were Committees of Safety, including the Rowan, Anson, Mecklenburg, Surry, and Tryon counties. Many members of these committees of safety became the officers of the regiments of militia.

The North Carolina Provincial Congress authorized 35 existing county militias to be organized on September 9, 1775. Some counties had already established their militias earlier than 1775. The Rowan County regiment was split on October 22, 1775 into two distinct regiment, the 1st Rowan County Regiment and the 2nd Rowan County Regiment. On December 22 that same year, the North Carolina Provincial Council split the Pasquotank County Regiment into two separate and distinct regiments, the 1st and 2nd Pasquotank County regiments. The two additional regiments brought the total number of county regiments to 37 by the end of 1775.

== Units ==
The following are the North Carolina militia brigades and regiments with their subordination, along with the dates established and disestablished, as well as the original commander when the unit was established by the Provincial Congress. Many counties started mustering and training militia before the Provincial Congress got around to it, as early as October 1774 (Johnson County Regiment). Regiments were subordinated to named brigades after brigades were established in 1776. Brigades were headed by a brigadier general and subordinate to the state militia headed by a major general officer, who reported to the Governor of North Carolina. As new counties were created by the legislature, new regiments were created and some were disbanded. At the time of the Battle of Kings Mountain in October 1780, there were 50 counties and 51 regiments of militia. Many regiments had two colonels. Soldiers and officers from these units were engaged in battles and skirmishes, primarily in North Carolina and South Carolina, but a few engagements were in Georgia, Virginia, and East Florida. As militia units, the soldiers did not serve full-time and returned home between engagements, musters, and drills.

North Carolina militia units in the American Revolution
Unit	Subordination	Established	Disbanded	Original Commander, Rank	Refs
North Carolina Militia and State Troops Command	Governor of North Carolina	1778	1783	MG John Ashe, Sr.	
Edenton District Brigade	North Carolina Militia Command	1776	1783	BG Edward Vail	
1st Regiment of North Carolina militia	Edenton District Brigade	1780	1780	Col Samuel Jarvis	
2nd Regiment of North Carolina militia	Edenton District Brigade	1780	1780	Col Benjamin Exum	
Bertie County Regiment	Edenton District Brigade	1775	1783	Col Thomas Witmell	
Camden County Regiment	Edenton District Brigade	1777	1783	Col Isaac Gregory	
Chowan County Regiment	Edenton District Brigade	1775	1783	Col Thomas Bonner	
Currituck County Regiment	Edenton District Brigade	1775	1783	Col Samuel Jarvis	
Gates County Regiment	Edenton District Brigade	1779	1783	Col Lawrence Baker	
Hertford County Regiment	Edenton District Brigade	1775	1783	Col Benjamin Wynns	
Martin County Regiment	Edenton District Brigade, Halifax District Brigade (Note: The Martin County Regiment was transferred from the Edenton District Brigade to the Halifax District Brigade of militia in December 1777.)	1775	1783	Col William Williams	
1st Pasquotank County Regiment	Edenton District Brigade	1775	1783	Col John Lowery	
2nd Pasquotank County Regiment	Edenton District Brigade	1775	1777	Col Isaac Gregory	
Perquimans County Regiment	Edenton District Brigade	1775	1783	Col Miles Harvey	
Tyrrell County Regiment	Edenton District Brigade	1775	1783	Col Edward Buncombe	
Halifax District Brigade	North Carolina Militia Command	1776	1783	BG Allen Jones	
1st Battalion of Volunteers	Halifax District Brigade	1776	1777	Col Abraham Sheppard, Sr	
2nd Battalion of Volunteers	Halifax District Brigade	1776	1777	Col Francis Locke	
Bute County Regiment	Halifax District Brigade	1775	1779	Col William Person	
Edgecombe County Regiment	Halifax District Brigade	1775	1783	Col William Haywood	
Franklin County Regiment	Halifax District Brigade	1779	1783	Col Benjamin Seawell	
Halifax County Regiment	Halifax District Brigade	1775	1783	Col John Bradford	
Nash County Regiment	Halifax District Brigade	1777	1783	Col James Clinch	
Northampton County Regiment	Halifax District Brigade	1775	1783	Col Allen Jones	
Warren County Regiment	Halifax District Brigade	1779	1783	Col Thomas Eaton	
Hillsborough District Brigade	North Carolina Militia Command	1776	1783	BG Thomas Person	
Caswell County Regiment	Hillsborough District Brigade	1777	1783	Col James Saunders	
Chatham County Regiment	Hillsborough District Brigade	1775	1783	Col Ambrose Ramsey	
Granville County Regiment	Hillsborough District Brigade	1775	1783	Col. Joseph Taylor, Lt. Col. John Taylor	
Mounted Volunteers Regiment	Hillsborough District Brigade	1780	1780	Col Philip Taylor	
Northern Orange County Regiment (Note: The Northern Orange County Regiment was renamed the Caswell County Regiment in 1777)	Hillsborough District Brigade	1776	1777	Col James Saunders	
Orange County Regiment (Note: The Orange County Regiment was renamed the Southern Orange County Regiment in 1776 and then back to Orange County Regiment in 1777)	Hillsborough District Brigade	1775	1783	Col John Hogan	
Randolph County Regiment	Hillsborough District Brigade	1779	1783	Col Andrew Balfour	
Wake County Regiment	Hillsborough District Brigade	1775	1783	Col John Hinton, Col. Thomas Wooten	
New Bern District Brigade	North Carolina Militia Command	1776	1783	BG Richard Caswell	
Beaufort County Regiment	New Bern District Brigade	1775	1783	Col James Bonner	
Carteret County Regiment	New Bern District Brigade	1775	1783	Col William Thompson	
Craven County Regiment	New Bern District Brigade	1775	1783	Col Joseph Leech	
Dobbs County Regiment	New Bern District Brigade	1775	1783	Col Abraham Sheppard	
Hyde County Regiment	New Bern District Brigade	1775	1783	Col Rotheas Latham	
Johnston County Regiment	New Bern District Brigade	1775	1783	Col Needham Bryan	
Jones County Regiment	New Bern District Brigade	1779	1783	Col John Bryan	
Pitt County Regiment	New Bern District Brigade	1775	1783	Col John Simpson	
Wayne County Regiment	New Bern District Brigade	1779	1783	Col Benjamin Exum (Note: The Wayne County Regiment had a second Colonel, John Sheppard, Sr., who served with Colonel Exum.)	
Morgan District Brigade	North Carolina Militia Command	1782	1783	BG Charles McDowell	
Davidson County Regiment (Note: Davidson, Greene, Sullivan, and Washington counties became part of the Southwest Territory in 1790 and part of Tennessee in 1796.)	Morgan District Brigade	1783	1783	Col Anthony Bledsoe	
Greene County Regiment	Morgan District Brigade	1783	1783	Col Joseph Harden	
Salisbury District Brigade	North Carolina Militia Command	1776	1783	BG Griffith Rutherford	
Anson County Regiment	Salisbury District Brigade	1775	1783	Col Samuel Spencer	
Burke County Regiment	Salisbury District Brigade, Morgan District Brigade (Note: Burke, Lincoln, Rutherford, Sullivan, Washington, and Wilkes County Regiments were transferred to the newly-created Morgan District Brigade of Militia in May 1782.)	1777	1782	Lieutenant Colonel (LTC) William Armstrong	
Guilford County Regiment	Salisbury District Brigade	1775	1783	Col Ransom Sutherland	
Lincoln County Regiment	Salisbury District Brigade, Morgan District Brigade	1779	1783	Col William Graham	
1st Mecklenburg County Regiment	Salisbury District Brigade	1775	1783	Col Thomas Polk	
2nd Mecklenburg County Regiment	Salisbury District Brigade	1779	1780	Col Caleb Phifer	
Polk's Regiment of Light Dragoons	Mecklenburg County Regiment, State Troops Command (1781)	1780	1781	LTC William Polk, William	
Independent Corps of Light Horse	Independent (Note: The Independent Corps of Light Horse was made up of men mainly from the Mecklenburg County Regiment but also included one company from Caswell County and two companies from Rowan County.)	1780	1780	Maj William Richardson Davie	
Montgomery County Regiment	Salisbury District Brigade	1779	1783	Col John Little	
Richmond County Regiment	Salisbury District Brigade	1779	1783	Colonel Henry William Harrington (Note: The Richmond County Regiment had two other colonels: Colonel Charles Medlock (1779–1783, commander); Colonel Thomas Crawford (1780–1783, 2nd colonel))	
Rowan County Regiment	Salisbury District Brigade	1775	1783	Col Griffith Rutherford (Note: Prior to 1775, the colonial Rowan County Regiment was commanded by Colonel Alexander Osborne, father of Adlai Osborne)	
2nd Rowan County Regiment	Salisbury District Brigade	1775	1777	Col Adlai Osborne	
2nd Rowan County Regiment	Salisbury District Brigade	1782	1783	Col James Brandon	
Rutherford County Regiment	Salisbury District Brigade, Morgan District Brigade	1779	1783	Col Andrew Hampton	
Sullivan County Regiment	Salisbury District Brigade, Morgan District Brigade	1779	1783	Col Isaac Shelby	
Surry County Regiment	Salisbury District Brigade	1775	1783	Col Martin Armstrong	
Tryon County Regiment	Salisbury District Brigade	1775	1779	Col William Graham	
Washington District Regiment (Note: The Washington District Regiment was renamed as the Washington County Regiment on December 18, 1777.)	Salisbury District Brigade	1776	1777	Col John Carter	
Washington County Regiment (Note: After the war, Washington County, North Carolina became part of the Southwest Territory in 1790. In 1779, Sullivan County was created by North Carolina from part of Washington County. In 1783, Green County was created by North Carolina out of Washington County. When Tennessee was admitted to the United States in 1796, Washington County became Washington County, Tennessee. This county should not be confused with a separate location, Washington County, North Carolina created in 1799 from Tyrrell County.)	Salisbury District Brigade, Morgan District Brigade	1777	1783	Col Evan Shelby	
Wilkes County Regiment	Salisbury District Brigade, Morgan District Brigade	1777	1783	Col Benjamin Cleveland	
Wilmington District Brigade	North Carolina Militia Command	1776	1783	BG John Ashe, Sr.	
1st Battalion of Militia	Wilmington District Brigade	1776	1776	Col Thomas Brown	
2nd Battalion of Militia	Wilmington District Brigade	1776	1776	Colonel Peter Dozier (Note: Colonel Philemon Hawkins, Jr. was selected but declined to serve. Colonel Peter Dozier was selected in 1776.)	
Bladen County Regiment	Wilmington District Brigade	1775	1783	Col Thomas Robeson, Jr.	
Brunswick County Regiment	Wilmington District Brigade	1775	1783	Col Robert Howe	
Cumberland County Regiment	Wilmington District Brigade	1775	1783	Col Thomas Rutherford	
Duplin County Regiment	Wilmington District Brigade	1775	1783	Col James Kenan	
New Hanover County Regiment	Wilmington District Brigade	1775	1783	Col James Moore	
Onslow County Regiment	Wilmington District Brigade	1775	1783	Col William Cray	
Overmountain Men (Note: The term Overmountain Men was not used at the time of the American Revolution. The term was fabricated in the 1830s to describe the Tennessee men without using the word Tennesseans or western North Carolina men. It is included here for completeness. Using the term Overmountain Men was one way of referring to the regiments in what would become Tennessee, i.e. Washington County Regiment, Sullivan County Regiment, Greene County Regiment, and Davidson County Regiment.)	Salisbury District Brigade, Morgan District Brigade	1776	1783	Col Isaac Shelby (Note: Isaac Shelby was one of the most senior colonels of regiments in the Appalachians, so when he came east he was referred to as the de facto leader of all troops from western North Carolina.)	

== Bibliography ==
Despite a requirement by the early government of North Carolina to keep muster roles of the militia, very few of these have survived. However, efforts of both amateur and professional historians, such as William S. Powell, William T. Graves, and J.D. Lewis, the composition and history of the North Carolina militia has been reconstructed from thousands of individual records and compiled in reference works such as those listed below.

- Crow, Jeffrey J. (1975). A Chronicle of North Carolina During the American Revolution, 1763–1789. Raleigh: North Carolina Department of Cultural Resources, Division of Archives and History.
- Durham, J. Lloyd. "Outfitting an American Revolutionary Soldier, Equipment of a Militiaman". NCPedia.
- Haun, Weynette Parks (1987). North Carolina Department of Archives and History, North Carolina Revolutionary Army Accounts-Secretary of State Treasurer's and Comptroller's Papers Journal "A" (Public Accounts) 1775–1776. Durham, N.C. OCLC 987872706.
- Howard, Josh. "North Carolina in the US Revolution". NCPedia.
- Lewis, J. D. (2012). NC Patriots 1775–1783: Their Own Words., Volume I – NC Continental Line, 2012, ISBN 978-1-4675-4808-3; Volume II – The Provincial and State Troops(Part 1), ISBN 978-1-4675-4809-0; Volume III – The Provincial and State Troops (Part 2), ISBN 978-1-4675-4810-6
- Powell, William (2016). Dictionary of North Carolina Biography. Chapel Hill: University of North Carolina Press., Vol I: ISBN 978-1-4696-2901-8, 2016; Vol II: ISBN 978-1-4696-2899-8; Vol III: ISBN 978-1-4696-2902-5, Vol IV: ISBN 978-1-4696-2900-1, Vol V: ISBN 978-1-4696-2903-2, Vol VI: ISBN 978-1-4696-2904-9
- Russel, David Lee (2000). The American Revolution in the Southern Colonies. Jefferson, North Carolina: McFarland & Company, Inc. ISBN 9780786407835.
- Russell, Phillips (1965). North Carolina in the Revolutionary War. Charlotte: Heritage Printers. OCLC 4888768.
- Saunders, William, ed. (1890). The Colonial Records of North Carolina. Vol. 10. Raleigh: Josephus Daniels – via HathiTrust.
- Wheeler, Earl M. (July 1964). "Development and Organization of the North Carolina Militia". North Carolina Historical Review. 41 (3): 307–323.
- Whitaker, Harriet Reed; Hay, Gertrude Sloan, eds. (1932). Roster of Soldiers from North Carolina in the American Revolution. The North Carolina Daughters of the American Revolution – via HathiTrust.

== See also ==
- List of United States militia units in the American Revolutionary War
- List of military leaders in the American Revolutionary War
- List of British units in the American Revolutionary War
- Southern Campaigns: Pension Transactions for a description of the transcription effort by Will Graves
- Southern theater of the American Revolutionary War
- North Carolina Line
- North Carolina State Navy
- Militia (United States)
- Category for North Carolina militiamen in the American Revolution
