= Morgan District Brigade =

- Active: 1782-1783
- Allegiance: (United States) North Carolina
- Branch: North Carolina militia
- Type: Militia

Commanders
- Notable commanders: 1. Brigadier General Charles McDowell

The Morgan District Brigade was an administrative division of the North Carolina militia during the American Revolutionary War. This unit was established by the North Carolina Provincial Congress on May 17, 1782, and disbanded at the end of the war. The commander was Brigadier General Charles McDowell.

== Regiments ==
The following are the North Carolina militia regiments that were part of the Morgan District Brigade, along with the dates established and disestablished.

Unit	Subordinate Brigade	Created	Disbanded	Original Commander, Rank
Morgan District Brigade	North Carolina Militia	1782	1783	McDowell, Charles, B.G.
Davidson County Regiment	Morgan	1783	1783	Bledsoe, Anthony, Col
Greene County Regiment	Morgan	1783	1783	Harden, Joseph, Col
Lincoln County Regiment	Salisbury, Morgan	1779	1783	Graham, William, Col
Burke County Regiment	Salisbury, Morgan	1777	1782	Armstrong, William, Lt Col
Rutherford County Regiment	Salisbury, Morgan	1779	1783	Hampton, Andrew, Col
Sullivan County Regiment	Salisbury, Morgan	1779	1783	Shelby, Isaac, Col
Washington County Regiment	Salisbury, Morgan	1777	1783	Shelby, Evan, Col
Wilkes County Regiment	Salisbury, Morgan	1777	1783	Cleveland, Benjamin, Col

=== Davidson County Regiment ===
The Davidson County Regiment was created on May 16, 1783 when the North Carolina General Assembly created Davidson County out of Cherokee Lands in what is now central Tennessee. All officers were appointed and commissioned by the Governor. It was commanded by Colonel Anthony Bledsoe. This unit did not see any action in the Revolutionary War. This Davidson County became part of Tennessee. It was named for Colonel William Lee Davidson, who was killed at the Battle of Cowan's Ford during the American Revolution. (This county should not be confused with Davidson County, North Carolina, which was not created until 1848.)

=== Greene County Regiment ===
The Green County Regiment was created on April 26, 1783 by the North Carolina General Assembly out of part of the Washington County Regiment. It was commanded by Colonel Joseph Harden, Sr. and Colonel Alexander Outlaw. The Green County Regiment was active until the end of the war. Because it was created so late, none of its units participated in any battles or skirmishes.
