= Montgomery County Regiment =

American colonial military unit

- Active: 1779-1783
- Allegiance: North Carolina
- Branch: North Carolina militia
- Type: Militia
- Part of: Salisbury District Brigade

Commanders
- Notable commanders: Col. John Little; Col. William Lofton

The Montgomery County Regiment was authorized on February 8, 1778 by the North Carolina General Assembly of 1778. It was created at the same time that Montgomery County, North Carolina was created out of the northern half of Anson County, North Carolina. It was subordinate to the Salisbury District Brigade of militia. The regiment was engaged in battles and skirmishes against the British and Cherokee during the American Revolution in North Carolina, South Carolina and Georgia between 1776 and 1781. It was active until the end of the war.

== Officers ==
Colonels and commandant:

- Colonel John Little (2nd colonel 1779–1783)
- Colonel William Lofton (commandant 1779–1783)

Known lieutenant colonels:

- Lt. Col. Drury Ledbetter
- Lt. Col. William Pickett
- Lt. Col. Thomas Childs
- Lt. Col. George Davidson

Known majors:

- Maj. James Crump
- Maj. George Davidson
- Maj. John Cox
- Maj. Etheldred Harris
- Maj. Thomas Harris
- Maj. West Harris
- Maj. Charles Jones
- Maj. Buckner Kimbrell

Known adjutants:

- David Amerson
- William Johnson

The regiment had 22 known companies led by a captain with subordinate lieutenants, ensigns, sergeants, corporals, privates, drummers, and fifers.

== Engagements ==
The regiment was engaged in 13 known battles, skirmishes and sieges in which components of the Montgomery County Regiment participated between 1779 and 1781. These 13 engagements were located in North Carolina (6), South Carolina (6), and Georgia (1).

== See also ==
- List of American Revolutionary War battles
- Salisbury District Brigade
- Southern Campaigns: Pension Transactions for a description of the transcription effort by Will Graves
- Southern theater of the American Revolutionary War

== Bibliography ==
- Arthur, John Preston (1914). Western North Carolina; a history (1730-1913). National Society Daughters of the American Revolution of North Carolina. Edward Buncombe Chapter, Asheville, North Carolina.
- Hunter, C.L. (1877). Sketches of western North Carolina, historical and biographical : illustrating principally the Revolutionary period of Mecklenburg, Rowan, Lincoln, and adjoining counties, accompanied with miscellaneous information, much of it never before published. Raleigh: Raleigh News Steam Job Print. p. 166-183.
