= Washington District Regiment =

American colonial military unit

Washington District/County Regiment
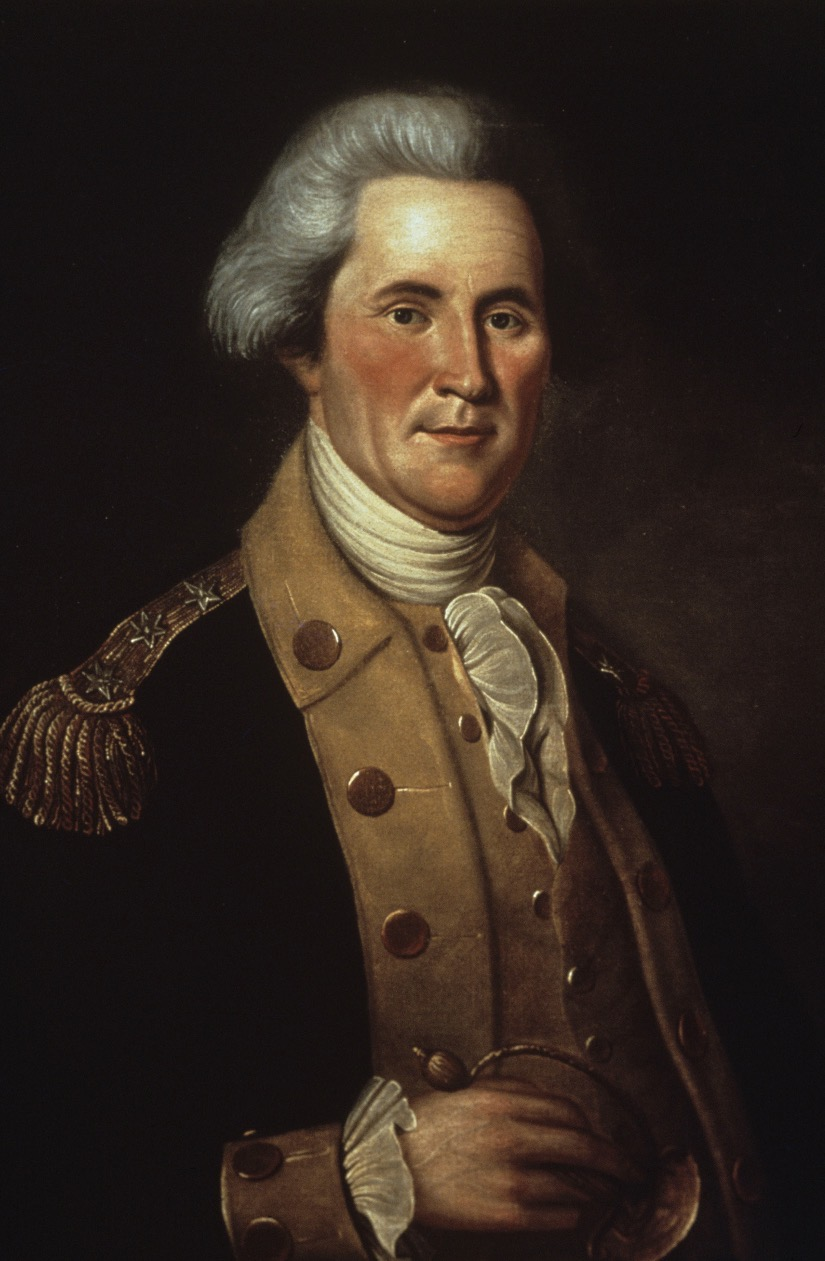
- Colonel John Sevier
- Active: 1776–1777 Washington District regiment, 1777–1783 Washington County regiment
- Country: United States
- Allegiance: North Carolina
- Branch: North Carolina militia
- Type: Militia
- Part of: Salisbury District Brigade, Morgan District Brigade
- Engagements: Siege of Fort Caswell Cherokee Expedition Battle of Brier Creek Battle of Guilford Court House Battle of Monck's Corner Battle of Camden Battle of Musgrove Mill Battle of Kings Mountain Battle of Cowpens Battle of Eutaw Springs

Commanders
- Notable commanders: Col. John Carter; Col. Evan Shelby, Sr. Col. John Sevier

The Washington District Regiment was authorized on December 23, 1776 by the Province of North Carolina Congress. It was subordinate to the Salisbury District Brigade of militia. The regiment was renamed the Washington County Regiment. The regiment was engaged in battles and skirmishes against the British and Cherokee during the American Revolution in Virginia, North Carolina, South Carolina, Tennessee, and Georgia between 1776 and 1782. It was active until the end of the war.

== History ==
The Washington District Regiment was established on December 23, 1776 by the North Carolina Provincial Congress. Washington District became Washington County, North Carolina in 1777. The regiment was renamed the Washington County Regiment on December 18, 1777. The Washington District Regiment was part of the Salisbury District Brigade when it was created in 1776. It was transferred to the newly created Morgan District Brigade in 1782.

After the war, Washington County, North Carolina became part of the Southwest Territory in 1790. In 1779, Sullivan County was created by North Carolina from part of Washington County. In 1783, Green County was created by North Carolina out of Washington County. When Tennessee was admitted to the United States in 1796, Washington County became Washington County, Tennessee. This county should not be confused with a separate location, Washington County, North Carolina created in 1799 from Tyrrell County.

Colonels of the regiment included the following:

- Colonel John Carter, commandant (1776–1781)
- Colonel Evan Shelby Sr., second colonel (1776–1783)
- Colonel John Sevier, commandant (1781–1783), Lieutenant Colonel (1776–1781)

See Engagements of the Salisbury District Brigade Regiments for a list of engagements of this regiment.

== See also ==
- List of American Revolutionary War battles
- Southern Campaigns: Pension Transactions for a description of the transcription effort by Will Graves
- Southern theater of the American Revolutionary War
- Washington District, North Carolina, Washington County, Tennessee
