= Battle of Wetzell's Mill =

1781 battle

Coordinates: 36.08°N 79.79°W

- Part of the American Revolutionary War
Date	March 6, 1781
Location	Guilford County, North Carolina
Result	Inconclusive

Belligerents
Great Britain: (Kingdom of Great Britain) Loyalists	United States

Commanders and leaders
(Kingdom of Great Britain) Banastre Tarleton	(United States) Otho Williams

Strength
1,200 regulars and militia	600–700 militia

Casualties and losses
30 killed or wounded	10 killed 20 wounded

The Battle of Wetzell's Mill (the name may also be spelled Weitzell, Weitzel, Whitesell, Whitsell or Whitsall) was an American Revolutionary War battle fought on March 6, 1781, between detachments of Nathanael Greene's Continental Army and militia and Banastre Tarleton's Loyalist provincial troops in Guilford County, North Carolina.

Greene was trying to avoid encounters with the larger British Cornwallis' larger army while awaiting the arrival of additional troops, and had sent Williams and several hundred men on reconnaissance to watch Cornwallis' movements. Cornwallis learned where Williams was on March 4, and, realizing he could be trapped because he was separated from Greene's army by Reedy Ford Creek, sent Tarleton and 1,200 men toward the ford at Wetzell's Mill. Early on March 6 Tarleton's men tried to sneak up on Williams' position, then about ten miles south of the ford. After a brief skirmish, the two forces raced toward the ford. Williams kept Harry "Light Horse" Lee in the rear to cover their retreat, and reached the ford ahead of Tarleton. His army crossed, at which point he decided to make a stand at the crossing.

Tarleton's first attempt to cross was repulsed, but the second succeeded, and Williams retreated.

== Background ==
The British attempt to regain control of its rebellious colonies in the American Revolutionary War through the "southern strategy" of gaining control over the southern colonies and moving north began in late 1779 with the capture of Savannah, Georgia. By early 1781, Georgia and South Carolina were nominally under British control, two Continental Armies had been captured or routed, and General Lord Cornwallis was chasing a third, under the command of General Nathanael Greene, out of North Carolina. Greene, with a smaller and more mobile army, had risked division of his forces at one point, and was rewarded with Daniel Morgan's victory over Cornwallis' main cavalry force, led by Lieutenant Colonel Banastre Tarleton, at the Battle of Cowpens in January 1781.

Cornwallis, realizing he could more easily defeat Morgan or Greene before their forces rejoined, stripped his army of all nonessentials, and gave chase. Greene and Morgan were able to join forces, but they were still relatively weak due to expiring enlistments, so Greene continued to retreat northward toward Virginia, avoiding full-scale battle, in what became known as the "Race to the Dan" (after the Dan River, which flows near the border between Virginia and North Carolina). Greene beat Cornwallis to the Dan, which, like many other rivers, was swollen by heavy rains, and crossed to relative safety in Virginia.

After receiving additional supplies and some reinforcements, Greene recrossed the Dan with an eye toward finally forcing a confrontation after additional troops arrived. Criss-crossing Guilford County] with his main army, Greene detached Colonel Otho Williams with companies of light infantry, riflemen, and the cavalry of Henry "Light Horse Harry" Lee to maintain contact with Cornwallis' army so that he could continue to maneuver without a large confrontation. Cornwallis sent out Tarleton on expeditions to find Greene's army so that a confrontation could be forced.

On March 3, Williams sent out a company of men to harass the British camp. They killed several sentries and took two prisoners before returning to Williams' camp at Wetzell's Mill, near a ford across Reedy Ford Creek. Cornwallis ordered Tarleton out on March 6 to go after Williams.

== Order of battle ==
=== Patriots ===
The Patriot order of battle included:

Approximately 700 men led by Col. Otho Williams - Commanding Officer

- Lee's Legion, led by Lt. Col. Henry Lee of Virginia, with six known companies
- 3rd Regiment of Continental Light Dragoons, led by Lt. Col. William Washington of Virginia, Maj. Richard Call, with three known companies
- 1st Regiment of Continental Light Dragoons detachment of one known company, led by Capt. Griffin Fauntleroy
- Washington County militia of Virginia led by Col. William Campbell, with two known companies. Under Campbell was Captain William Morton's Rifle Company. This company consisted of select riflemen from Virginia's Charlotte and Halifax Counties.
- Boutetourt County militia of Virginia led by Col. William Preston, with 300 men in five known companies
- Salisbury District Brigade of the North Carolina militia led by Brigadier General Andrew Pickens (a temporary position), with detachments from Georgia, South Carolina, and North Carolina Militia in the following units:
  - Upper Ninety-Six District Regiment of South Carolina detachment led by Maj. James McCall with unknown number of men
  - Georgia militia, led by Unknown with unknown number of men
  - Surry County Regiment of the North Carolina militia led by Lt. Col. Joseph Winston, with eight known companies led by:
  - Wilkes County Regiment of the North Carolina militia detachment of one known company
  - Lincoln County Regiment of the North Carolina militia detachment of one known company
  - Mecklenburg County Regiment of the North Carolina militia detachment of one known company
  - Guilford County Regiment of the North Carolina militia detachment led by Lt. Col. Robert Ralston with two known companies
  - Caswell County Regiment of the North Carolina militia detachment led by Col. William Moore, with five known companies
  - Orange County Regiment of the North Carolina militia detachment of two known companies

=== British and Loyalist ===
The British and Loyalist forces of about 1,000 men were under the command of Lt. Col. Banastre Tarleton. Units included:

- British Legion, led by Lt. Col. Banastre Tarleton, with 75 men
- 33rd Regiment of Foot led by Lt. Col. James Webster, Capt. James Campbell, with 234 officers & men
- III Feld Jäger Regiment Anspach-Beyreuth detachment of 97 men led by Capt. Friedrich Wilhelm von Röder
- 23rd Regiment of Foot (Royal Welsh Fusiliers) detachment of 258 men in two known companies, led by:
- 71st Regiment of Foot (Fraser's Highlanders), 2nd Battalion detachment led by Capt. Dugald Stuart, with unknown number of men
- Brigade of Guards led by Lt. Col. John Goodricke, with 200 men in three (3) known companies
- Royal Regiment of Artillery, 3rd Battalion, Number 1 Company, led by Lt. John MacLeod with two 3-pounders and two 6-pounders

== Battle ==
Williams was alerted to Tarleton's approach, and managed to withdraw most of his men across the ford, where they established a defensive line. Tarleton's men then drove the last of Williams' light infantry across the river. Tarleton sent a company of men from the 23rd Regiment under James Webster to storm across the ford. Williams' riflemen were ordered to target the officer, and Henry Lee reported that they "discharged their rifles at him, one by one", but "himself and horse were untouched". The British eventually succeeded in crossing the creek, and after several miles of pursuit, Tarleton gave up the chase and rejoined the main army.

== Aftermath ==
Williams and his men rejoined Greene's army, which, following the arrival of 2,500 reinforcements, prepared to meet Cornwallis near Guilford County, North Carolina, where the key Battle of Guilford Courthouse was fought on March 15.
