= Rutherford County Regiment =

- Active: 1779-1783
- Allegiance: North Carolina
- Branch: List of North Carolina militia units in the American Revolution
- Type: Militia
- Role: infantry
- Part of: Brigade

Commanders
- Notable commanders: Col. Andrew Hampton; Col. Robert Porter

The Rutherford County Regiment was authorized on October 30, 1779, by the Province of North Carolina Congress. It was created at the same time that Rutherford County, North Carolina was created out of the western part of Tryon County, North Carolina when Tryon County and its regiment of militia were abolished. Officers were appointed and commissioned by the Governor. The regiment was engaged in battles and skirmishes against the British during the American Revolution in North Carolina, Georgia, and South Carolina between 1779 and 1782. It was active until the end of the war.

== Officers ==
The Rutherford County Regiment was placed under the existing Salisbury District Brigade when it was created in 1779. This brigade was commanded by Brigadier General Griffith Rutherford. In may of 1782, the regiment was re-subordinated to the newly created Morgan District Brigade. The regiment included the following colonels and commandants:

- Colonel Andrew Hampton (1779–1781): He had previously been a captain in the Tryon County Regiment of Militia (1775–1776) and lieutenant colonel in the Tryon County Regiment of Militia (1776–1779)
- Colonel Robert Porter (1781–1783): He had previously been a captain in the Tryon County Regiment of Militia (1776–1777), major in the Tryon County Regiment of Militia (1777–1779), major in the Rutherford County Regiment of Militia (1779–1780), and lieutenant colonel in the Rutherford County Regiment of Militia (1780–1781).

Known lieutenant colonels included:

- Lt. Col. Baylis Earle
- Lt. Col. John Earle
- Lt. Col. Jack
- Lt. Col. James Miller
- Lt. Col. Robert Porter
- Lt. Col. William Porter

Known majors included:

- Maj. Adam Hampton
- Maj. Robert Porter
- Maj. William Rutherford
- Maj. Patrick Watson
- Maj. James Gray
- Maj. Richard Lewis
- Maj. James Porter
- Maj. Reese Porter
- Maj. Richard Singleton

The unit also had one adjutant, William Walker, and a surgeon, Joseph Camp. The regiment included 64 known companies headed by captains with lieutenants, sergeants, ensigns, corporals under the captain.

== Engagements ==
The regiment was engaged in 23 known battles and skirmishes in North Carolina, South Carolina, and Georgia. See Salisbury District Brigade#Engagements for a chronological list of these battles and skirmishes, along with other regiments of the brigade. One or more companies participated in each of these engagements.

== See also ==
- List of American Revolutionary War battles
- Salisbury District Brigade
- Southern Campaigns: Pension Transactions for a description of the transcription effort by Will Graves
- Southern theater of the American Revolutionary War

== Bibliography ==
- Arthur, John Preston, Western North Carolina; a history (1730–1913), National Society Daughters of the American Revolution of North Carolina. Edward Buncombe Chapter, Asheville, North Carolina, Publication date 1914, Link, accessed Jan 29, 2019
- Hunter, C.L.; Sketches of western North Carolina, historical and biographical : illustrating principally the Revolutionary period of Mecklenburg, Rowan, Lincoln, and adjoining counties, accompanied with miscellaneous information, much of it never before published, Raleigh : Raleigh News Steam Job Print, 1877; pages 166-183
- Mazzocchi, Jay (2006). "Rutherford County".
