= Sullivan County Regiment =

American colonial military unit

- Active: 1779-1783
- Allegiance: North Carolina
- Branch: North Carolina militia
- Type: Militia
- Part of: Brigade

Commanders
- Notable commanders: Col. Isaac Shelby

The Sullivan County Regiment was authorized on October 30, 1779 by the Province of North Carolina Congress. It was created at the same time that Sullivan County, North Carolina was created out of Washington County. Officers were appointed and commissioned by the Governor. The regiment was engaged in battles and skirmishes against the British during the American Revolution in Tennessee and South Carolina between 1780 and 1781. It was active until the end of the war. Part of Sullivan County, North Carolina was ceded by North Carolina to the federal government in 1789 and this became Sullivan County, Tennessee.

== Known engagements ==
The Sullivan County regiment was involved in eleven known battles and skirmishes between June 1780 and November 1781. These engagements took place in South Carolina and Tennessee.

Order	Date range	Battles/Skirmishes	State
1	6/18/1780	Battle of Hill's Iron Works	SC
2	7/26/1780	Battle of Thicketty Fort	SC
3	8/8/1780	Battle of Wofford's Iron Works	SC
4	8/18/1780	Battle of Musgrove's Mill	SC
5	10/7/1780	Battle of Kings Mountain	SC
6	12/16/1780	Battle of Boyd's Creek	TN
7	1/17/1781	Battle of Cowpens	SC
8	7/27/1781	Battle of Hudson's Ferry	SC
9	9/8/1781	Battle of Eutaw Springs	SC
10	10/16/1781	Battle of Moncks Corner #4	SC
11	11/27/1781	Battle of Fair Lawn Plantation	SC

== See also ==
- List of American Revolutionary War battles
- Salisbury District Brigade
- Southern Campaigns: Pension Transactions for a description of the transcription effort by Will Graves
- Southern theater of the American Revolutionary War

== Bibliography ==
- Arthur, John Preston, Western North Carolina; a history (1730-1913), National Society Daughters of the American Revolution of North Carolina. Edward Buncombe Chapter, Asheville, North Carolina, Publication date 1914, Link, accessed Jan 29, 2019
- Hunter, C.L.; Sketches of western North Carolina, historical and biographical : illustrating principally the Revolutionary period of Mecklenburg, Rowan, Lincoln, and adjoining counties, accompanied with miscellaneous information, much of it never before published, Raleigh : Raleigh News Steam Job Print, 1877; pages 166-183
- Mazzocchi, Jay (2006). "Richmond County".
