= Guilford County Regiment =

American colonial military unit

- Active: 1775-1783
- Allegiance: North Carolina
- Branch: North Carolina militia
- Type: Militia
- Part of: Salisbury District Brigade

Commanders
- Notable commanders: Col. Ransom Sutherland; Col. James Martin; Col. Risdel Moore; Col. John Peasley; Col. Samuel Isaacs

The Guilford County Regiment was authorized on September 9, 1775 by the Third North Carolina Provincial Congress. It was subordinate to the Salisbury District Brigade of militia. The regiment was engaged in battles and skirmishes against the British and Cherokee during the American Revolution in North Carolina, South Carolina and Georgia between 1776 and 1781. It was active until the end of the war.

== Officers ==
It was first commanded by Colonel Ransom Sutherland, who was appointed by the North Carolina Provincial Congress. On April 22, 1776, Sutherland resigned, and Lt. Colonel James Martin was appointed Colonel. Colonel Martin led the Guilford Militia at the Battle of Moore's Creek Bridge, at the Battle of Guilford Courthouse and in the Cherokee Expedition of 1776. The regiment served throughout the war.

Commandants and 2nd colonels:

- Colonel Ransom Sutherland (commandant, 1775-1776)
- Colonel James Martin (commandant, 1776-1782), (Lieutenant Colonel, 1775-1776)
- Colonel Risdel Moore (2nd colonel, 1779-1780)
- Colonel John Paisly/Peasley (2nd colonel, 1780-?)
- Colonel Samuel Isaacs (2nd colonel, 1781-1783)

Selected Captains (see Lewis for a complete list):

- Captain Arthur Forbes' Company: 1 Lieutenant, 1 Ensign, 2 Subalterns, 2 Corporals, 100 Rank & File
- Captain James Frost's Company: Lt. Jonas Frost, Ensign Simeon Frost, 2 Subalterns, 2 Corporals, 43 Rank & File
- Captain Samuel Sharp's Company: Lt. Joshua Young, 1 Ensign, 2 Subalterns, 2 Corporals, 80 Rank & File
- Captain John Donald's Company: Lt. James Ross, 1 Ensign, 2 Subalterns, 2 Corporals, 55 Rank & File
- Captain Asa Bashiers' Company: Lt. Samuel Rail, 1 Ensign, 2 Subalterns, 2 Corporals, 54 Rank & File
- Captain William Bethel's Company: 1 Lieutenant, 1 Ensign, 2 Subalterns, 2 Corporals, 60 Rank & File
- Captain Robert Bell's Company: Lt. Rees Porter, 1 Ensign, 2 Subalterns, 2 Corporals, 82 Rank & File
- Captain Henry Whitesel's Company: Lt. Lodowick Clap, 1 Ensign, 2 Subalterns, 2 Corporals, 60 Rank & File
- Captain John Nelson's Company: Lt. Josiah Gates, Ensign George Oliver, 2 Subalterns, 2 Corporals, 50 Rank & File
- Captain George Hamilton's Company: Lt. John Duff, 1 Ensign, 2 Subalterns, 2 Corporals, 102 Rank & File
- Captain William Wood's Company: Lt. George Pierce, Ensign James McKamie, 2 Subalterns, 2 Corporals, 46 Rank & File
- Captain Risdon Moore's Company: Lt. John Shelley, 1 Ensign, 2 Subalterns, 2 Corporals, 81 Rank & File
- Captain John Davis' Company: Lt. Thomas Cook, Ensign Benjamin Cook, 2 Subalterns, 2 Corporals, 64 Rank & File
- Captain Josiah Man's Company: 1 Lieutenant, 1 Ensign, 2 Subalterns, 2 Corporals, 54 Rank & File
- Captain James Holderness' Company: Lt. William Lewis, Ensign Turbefield Barns, 2 Subalterns, 2 Corporals, 147 Rank & File

== Battles ==
Elements of the Guilford County Militia participated in the following battles:

- Moore's Creek Bridge
- Cherokee Expedition of 1776
- Briar Creek
- Stono Ferry
- Siege of Charleston (1780)
- Camden
- Kings Mountain
- Cowpens
- Guilford Court House
- Siege of Ninety-Six (1781)
- Eutaw Springs

See Engagements for a more complete list of engagements and comparison with other regiments in the Salisbury District Brigade.

== See also ==
- List of American Revolutionary War battles
- Salisbury District Brigade
- Southern Campaigns: Pension Transactions for a description of the transcription effort by Will Graves
- Southern theater of the American Revolutionary War

== Bibliography ==
- Arthur, John Preston (1914). Western North Carolina; a history (1730-1913). National Society Daughters of the American Revolution of North Carolina. Edward Buncombe Chapter, Asheville, North Carolina.
- Hunter, C.L. (1877). Sketches of western North Carolina, historical and biographical : illustrating principally the Revolutionary period of Mecklenburg, Rowan, Lincoln, and adjoining counties, accompanied with miscellaneous information, much of it never before published. Raleigh: Raleigh News Steam Job Print. p. 166-183.
