= Salisbury District Brigade =

Historical administrative division of the North Carolina, USA militia

- Active: 1776–1783
- Allegiance: North Carolina
- Branch: North Carolina militia
- Type: infantry brigade
- Size: about 2,000 men
- Engagements: see #Engagements

Commanders
- Notable commanders: Brigadier General: 1. Griffith Rutherford; 2. Matthew Locke; 3. Henry William Harrington; 4. William Lee Davidson; 5. Andrew Pickens; 6. Ambrose Ramsey

The Salisbury District Brigade was an administrative division of the North Carolina militia during the American Revolutionary War (1776–1783). This unit was established by the Fourth North Carolina Provincial Congress on May 4, 1776, and disbanded at the end of the war.

== History ==
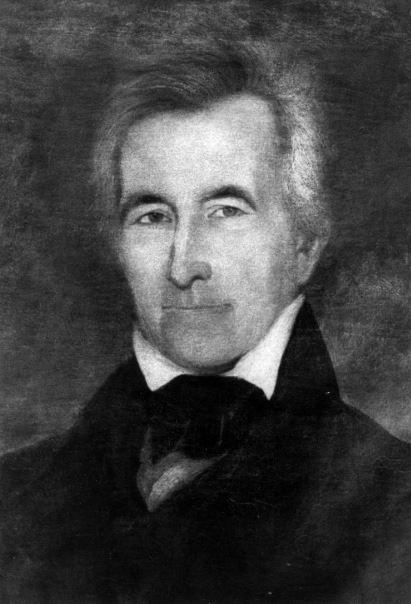
General William Lee Davidson

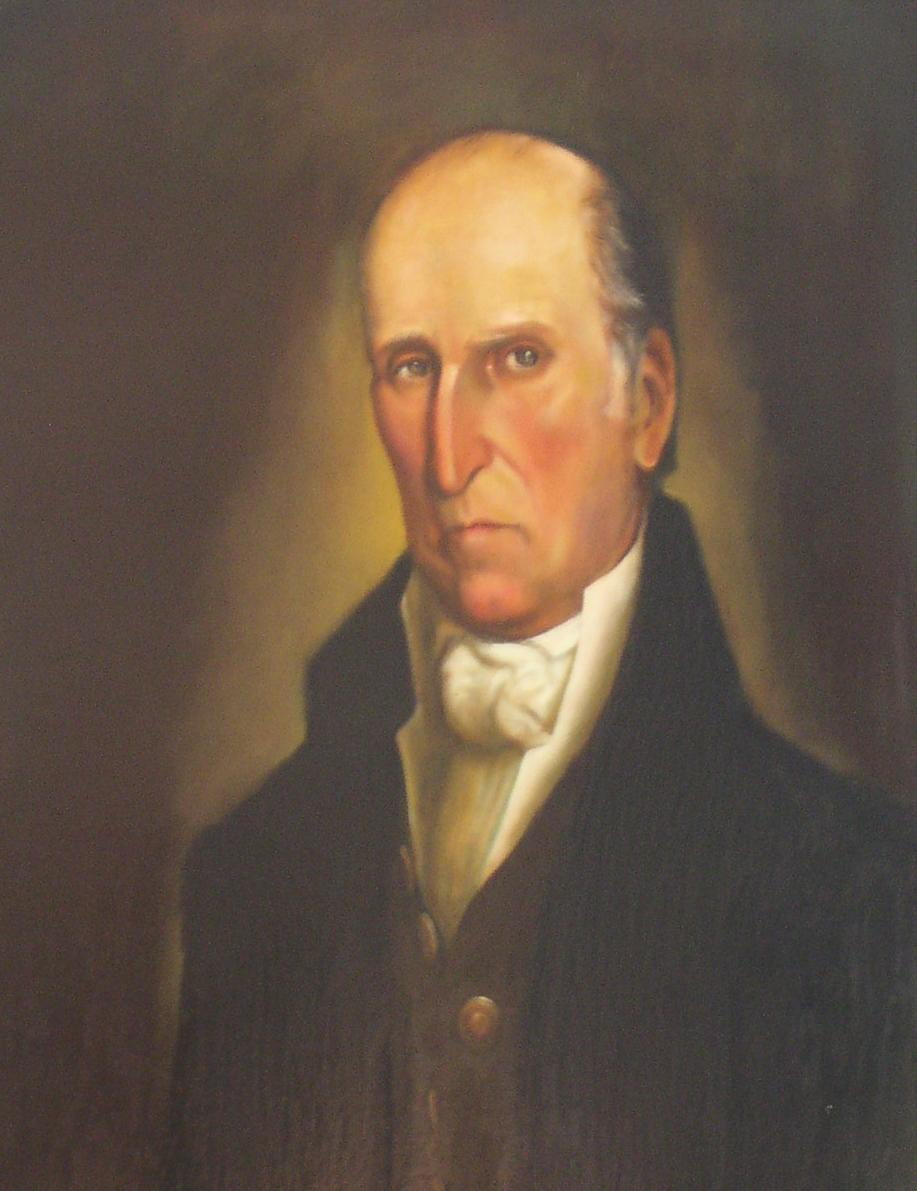
General Andrew Pickens

In August 1775, the Third Provincial Congress of North Carolina delegates appointed Cornelius Harnett the head of the Council of Safety which oversaw resistance to British rule. They also divided the colony into six military districts for the purpose of organizing militia and arranging representation in the executive body. The Salisbury District was one of these districts, which eventually led to the creation of the Salisbury District Brigade. At the county level, there were Committees of Safety, including the Rowan, Anson, Mecklenburg, Surry, and Tryon county committees of safety. Many members of the Rowan committee of safety became the officers of the regiments of the Salisbury District Brigade.

Griffith Rutherford was from Rowan County, North Carolina. He was commissioned as a Colonel and commandant of the Rowan County Regiment on September 9, 1775. On December 21, 1775, the North Carolina Provincial Congress split the Salisbury District into two separate regiments of minutemen—the 1st Battalion of Salisbury District Minutemen and the 2nd Battalion of Salisbury District Minutemen. Colonel Rutherford was assigned as commandant of the 1st Battalion, along with Colonel Thomas Wade. The 1st Battalion participated in one engagement, the Battle of Moore's Creek Bridge on February 27, 1776. Colonel Thomas Polk was commandant of the 2nd Battalion. The 2nd Battalion participated in the Battle of Great Cane Brake on December 22, 1775, the Snow Campaign on December 23, 1775 to December 30, 1775, and the Battle of Moore's Creek Bridge on February 27, 1776.

The minutemen battalions were considered "state troops" vice local militia. On April 10, 1776, the two battalions of minutemen regiments were disbanded in favor of local militia brigades and subordinate regiments. There were eventually six militia brigades by the end of the war. On April 22, 1776, Rutherford was commissioned as a brigadier general and assigned as the commandant of the Salisbury District Brigade that was established officially on May 4, 1776. Colonel Matthew Locke took over as commandant of the Rowan County Regiment.

== Commandants ==
Commandants of the Salisbury District Brigade and their dates of service were as follows:

- Brigadier General Griffith Rutherford was commandant from 1776 to 1783. At the Battle of Camden on August 16, 1780, he was taken POW and remained in British custody and imprisoned in Saint Augustine, Florida until he was released in a prisoner exchange in July 1781 and returned to service in September 1781. During his absence from duty, generals pro tempore filled in as commandants in the rank of general pro tempore.
- Brigadier General Matthew Locke was general pro tempore for a few months in 1779 while General Rutherford was in South Carolina for the Purrysburg expedition in early 1779.
- Brigadier General Henry William Harrington was general pro tempore from July to December 1780. The North Carolina Council of State appointed Henry William Harrington as brigadier general (pro tempore) to lead the Salisbury District Brigade while general Rutherford was sent to South Carolina to join up with components of the Southern Department. Brigadier General (pro temp) Henry William Harrington resigned his commission in November 1780.
- Brigadier General William Lee Davidson was general pro tempore from September 1780 to February 1781. He was commissioned as brigadier general pro tempore of Militia after Griffith Rutherford was captured at the battle of Camden, South Carolina on August 16, 1780. General Davidson was killed at the Battle of Cowan's Ford in Mecklenburg County, North Carolina on February 1, 1781 while opposing the re-entry of Cornwallis into North Carolina.
- Brigadier General Andrew Pickens was general pro tempore from February to March 1781. The colonels of the Salisbury District "elected" Andrew Pickens to replace Davidson. Pickens was a newly appointed general in the South Carolina militia and did not have an active assignment. However, general Pickens returned to the South Carolina militia in March and Colonel Ambrose Ramsey replaced him for the Battle of Guilford Courthouse.
- Brigadier General Ambrose Ramsey was general pro tempore on March 15, 1781 for the Battle of Guilford Courthouse, after which he returned to his assignment as colonel/commandant of the Chatham County Regiment.

== Regiments ==
The following regiments were subordinate to the Salisbury District Brigade. The date regiments were established and disbanded are shown. Those regiments marked with a "+" were transferred to the newly-created Morgan District Brigade of Militia in May 1782. The Washington County Regiment was called initially the Washington District Regiment until Washington County was created from Washington District. The 2nd Rowan County Regiment's name was changed to the "Burke County Regiment" in 1777 and then back to "2nd Rowan County Regiment" in 1782.

- Anson County Regiment (1775–1783)
- Burke County Regiment+ (1777–1782)
- Guilford County Regiment (1775–1783)
- Lincoln County Regiment+ (1779–1783)
- Mecklenburg County Regiment (1775–1783)
- 2nd Mecklenburg County Regiment (1779–1780)
- Montgomery County Regiment (1779–1783)
- Richmond County Regiment (1779–1783)
- Rowan County Regiment (1775–1783)
- 2nd Rowan County Regiment (1775–1777, 1782–1783)
- Rutherford County Regiment+ (1779–1783)
- Sullivan County Regiment+ (1779–1783)
- Surry County Regiment (1775–1783)
- Tryon County Regiment (1775–1779)
- Washington District Regiment (1776–1777)
- Washington County Regiment+ (1777–1782)
- Wilkes County Regiment+ (1777–1783)

The regiments were made up of male citizens over sixteen years of age. Regiments of militia were called up for service by the governor or the commanding general to serve for a campaign or for a period of time as needed. The soldiers were told what equipment they had to bring with them.

The brigade was reported to have a size of 1,400 men in 1781 but never more than 2,000 men the remainder of the war.

== Engagements ==
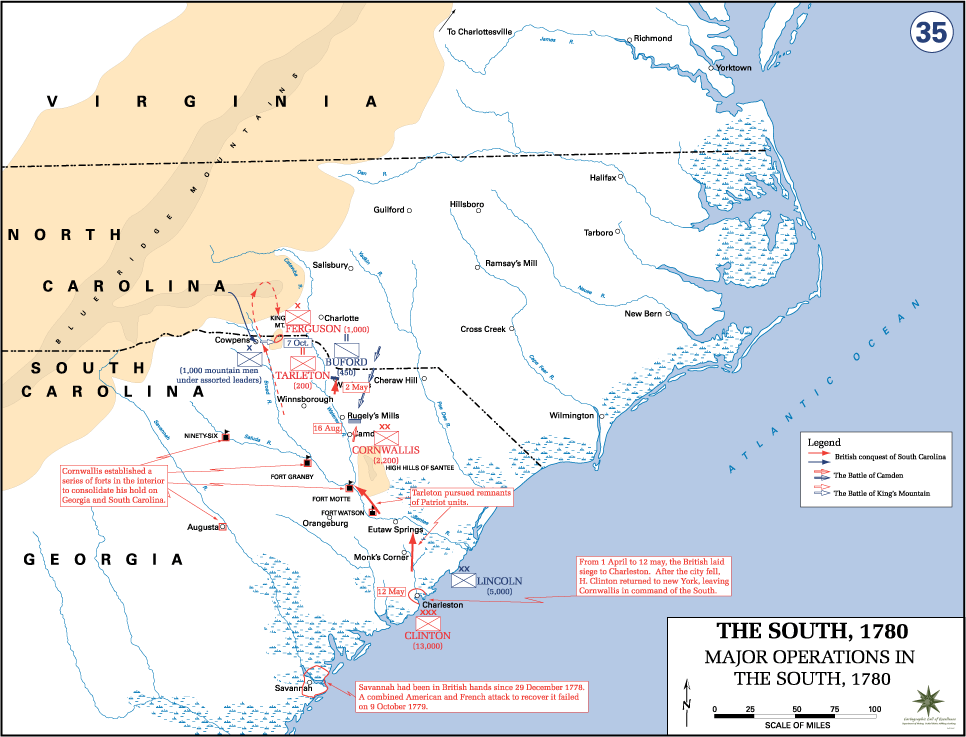
Major engagements in the Southern Campaign

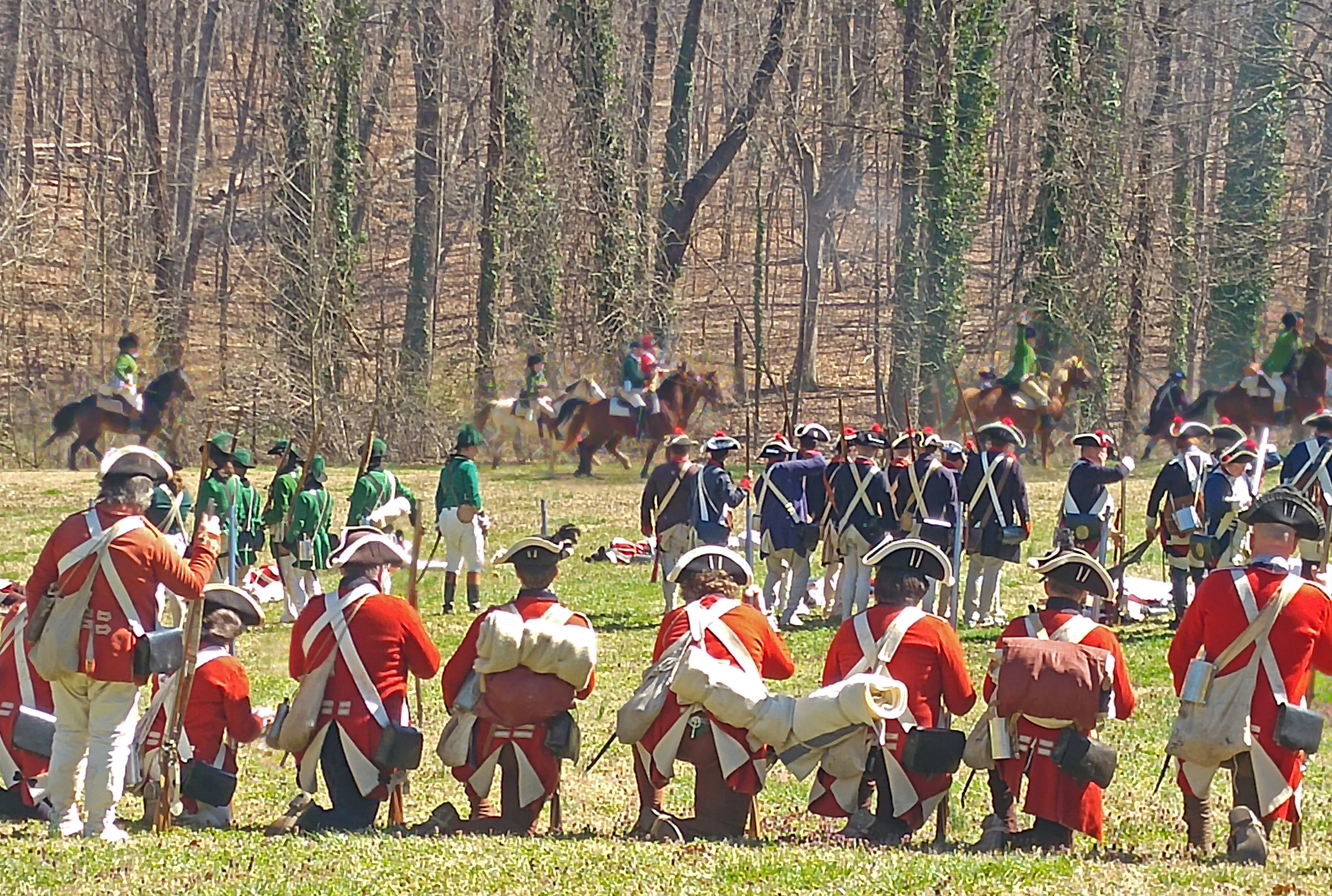
Battle of Guilford Courthouse Reenanctment

Regiments of the Salisbury District Brigade were involved in 98 known engagements (battles, sieges, and skirmishes), including six in Georgia, 32 in South Carolina, eight in Tennessee, and 52 in North Carolina. One or more companies of these regiments were involved in each engagement.

Order	Dates	Engagement	State	Anson	Burke	Guilford	Lincoln	Mecklenburg	2nd Mecklenburg	Montgomery	Richmond	Rowan	2nd Rowan	Rutherford	Sullivan	Surry	Tryon	Washington District	Washington County	Wilkes
1	11/19/1775 to 11/21/1775	Siege of Ninety-Six 1775	SC									x								
2	12/22/1775	Battle of Great Cane Brake	SC					x				x					x			
3	12/23/1775 to 12/30/1775	Snow Campaign	SC					x				x					x			
4	2/27/1776	Battle of Moore's Creek Bridge	NC	x		x		x								x	x			
5	3/20/1776	Encounter at Cross Creek, aka Cochrane's Mill	NC														x			
6	6/1/1776	Battle of Round Mountain	NC														x			
7	6/28/1776	Battle of Fort Moultrie #1	SC					x									x			
8	7//1/1776	Masacere at Quaker Meadows	NC														x			
9	7/3/1776	Cherokee siege of McDowell's Station	NC										x							
10	7/20/1776	Battle of Island Flats – VA Units	TN															x	x	
11	7/20/1776 to 8/2/1776	Siege of Fort Caswell – VA Units	TN															x	x	
12	8/1/1776 to 11/1/1776	Cherokee Expedition 1776	NC	x		x		x				x	x			x	x			
13	8/1/1776 to 12/28/1776	Cherokee Expedition 1776	TN													x	x	x	x	
14	10/1/1776	Defeat of the Cherokees at French Broad River	NC													x	x			
15	10/1/1776	Defeat of the Cherokee at French Broad River VA Units	NC															x	x	
16	6/1/1778	Skirmish at Gilbert Town #1	NC														x			
17	7/1/1778	Ambush near Salisbury	NC			x														
18	2/8/1779 to 2/10/1779	Battle of Carr's Fort	GA											x						
19	2/14/1779	Battle of Kettle Creek	GA											x						
20	3/1/1779	Encounter at Haw Fields	NC			x														
21	3/3/1779	Battle of Briar Creek	GA	x	x	x	x	x		x		x		x		x		x	x	x
22	4/10/1779 to 4/20/1779	Battle of Chickamauga Towns	TN		x		x									x		x	x	x
23	4/29/1779	Skirmish near Purrysburg	SC				x													
24	6/20/1779	Battle of Stono Ferry	SC		x	x	x	x				x		x		x				x
25	8/14/1779	Skirmish at Lockhart's Plantation	GA		x															
26	9/16/1779 to 10/18/1779	Siege of Savannah	GA											x		x				x
27	3/15/1780	Battle of Guilford Court House	NC	x	x	x	x	x		x		x		x		x		x	x	x
28	3/28/1780 to 5/12/1780	Siege of Charleston 1780	SC	x	x	x	x	x		x	x	x		x		x				x
29	4/14/1780	Battle of Moncks Corner #1	SC	x	x	x		x		x		x			x			x	x	
30	6/18/1780	Skirmish at Hill's Iron Works	SC												x					
31	6/20/1780	Battle of Ramseur's Mill	NC		x		x	x	x			x		x		x				x
32	7/13/1780	Skirmish at Gowen's Old Fort	SC		x															
33	7/15/1780	Engagement at Earle's Ford	SC		x							x		x						
34	7/17/1780	Skirmish at Prince's Fort	SC		x									x				x	x	
35	7/20/1780	Skirmish at Beaver Creek Ford	SC					x												
36	7/21/1780	Battle of Colson's Mill	NC	x		x	x	x	x	x		x				x				x
37	7/26/1780	Battle of Thicketty Fort	SC		x		x							x	x			x	x	
38	7/30/1780	Battle of Rocky Mount	SC				x	x												
39	8/6/1780	Battle of Hanging Rock	SC					x								x				x
40	8/8/1780	Battle of Wofford's Iron Works	SC		x		x							x	x			x	x	
41	8/11/1780	Battle of Little Lynches Creek	SC			x	x	x		x		x				x				
42	8/16/1780	Battle of Camden, General Rutherford Captured	SC	x	x	x	x	x		x	x	x				x		x	x	x
43	8/16/1780	Skirmish at Rugeley's Mills #1	SC				x													x
44	8/18/1780	Battle of Fishing Creek	SC		x		x	x				x				x				x
45	8/18/1780	Battle of Musgrove's Mill	SC		x									x	x			x	x	x
46	9/1/1780	Skirmish at Graham's Fort	NC				x													
47	9/1/1780	Skirmish at McAlpine Creek	NC			x														
48	9/9/1780	Skirmishes in Anson County	NC	x																
49	9/10/1780	Skirmish at Mask's Ferry	NC									x								
50	9/12/1780	Battle of Cane Creek	NC		x			x						x						
51	9/26/1780	Battle of Charlotte	NC	x																
52	10/3/1780	Battle of the Bees	NC					x												
53	10/7/1780	Battle of Kings Mountain	SC		x	x	x	x				x		x	x	x		x	x	x
54	10/8/1780	Battle of Richmond Town #2	NC													x				
55	10/14/1780	Battle of Shallow Ford	NC			x						x				x				x
56	11/20/1780	Battle of Blackstock's Farm	SC		x									x				x	x	
57	12/4/1780	Skirmish at Rugeley's Mills #2	SC			x	x	x												
58	12/16/1780	Battle of Boyd's Creek	TN												x			x	x	x
59	1/17/1781	Battle of Cowpens	SC		x	x	x	x		x		x		x	x	x		x	x	x
60	2//1/1781	Skirmish at Chestnut Mountain	NC													x				
61	2/1/1781	Battle of Cowan's Ford, General Davidson killed	NC		x	x	x	x		x		x		x		x				x
62	2/1/1781	Battle of Torrence's Tavern	NC		x	x	x	x				x				x				x
63	2/3/1781 to 2/4/1781	Skirmish at Trading Ford	NC					x				x								
64	2/4/1781	Skirmish at Grant's Creek	NC									x								
65	2/7/1781	Skirmish at Shallow Fords of the Yadkin	NC					x								?				
66	2/17/1781	Skirmish at Hart's Mill	NC					x				x				x				
67	2/19/1781	Battle of Fort Granby #1	SC					x												
68	2/25/1781	Battle of Haw River	NC			x	x	x				x				x				x
69	2/26/1781	Battle of Dickey's Farm	NC													x				x
70	3/1/1781	Engagement at Tuckasegee	NC															x	x	
71	3/4/1781	Battle of Clapp's Mill #1	NC			x		x								x				
72	3/5/1781	Battle of Clapp's Mill #2	NC					x												
73	3/6/1781	Battle of Wetzell/Whitesell's Mill	NC			x	x	x				x				x		x	x	x
74	3/7/1781	Skirmish at Reedy Fork	NC				x											x	x	
75	3/15/1781	Battle of New Garden Meeting House	NC			x										x				
76	3/31/1781	Skirmish at Cole's Bridge #2	NC	x																
77	4/2/1781 to 4/3/1781	Battle of Fort Nashborough	TN															x	x	
78	4/15/1781	Skirmish at Big Glades	NC																	x
79	4/25/1781	Battle of Hobkirk's Hill	SC		x		x	x				x								
80	5/21/1781 to 6/19/1781	Siege of Ninety-Six 1781	SC		x	x	x					x		x						x
81	5/24/1781 to 6/1/1781	Siege of Augusta	GA		x									x				x	x	
82	7/27/1781	Skirmish at Hudson's Ferry	SC												x					
83	8/2/1781	Battle of Rockfish Creek	NC					x												
84	8/3/1781	Massacre of Piney Bottom Creek	NC	x																
85	8/4/1781	Battle of Beatti's Bridge	NC	x				x		x	x									
86	8/9/1781	Skirmishes in Richmond & Cumberland Counties	NC	x						x	x									
87	8/28/1781	Skirmishes at Fanning's Mill	NC	x																
88	9/1/1781	Battle of Brown Marsh	NC			x				x										
89	9/1/1781	Battle of Little Raft Swamp	NC	x							x									
90	9/8/1781	Battle of Eutaw Springs	SC	x	x	x	x	x		x	x	x		x	x	x		x	x	x
91	9/11/1781	Battle of Moccasin Creek	TN															x	x	
92	9/13/1781	Battle of Lindley's Mill	NC	x		x						x								
93	10/15/1781	Battle of Raft Swamp	NC	x		x										x				
94	11/15/1781	Skirmish at Brick House	NC	x		x										x				
95	11/17/1781	Battle of Fair Lawn Plantation	SC												x				x	
96	12/10/1781	Battle of Cox's Mill #3	NC															x	x	x
97	6/1/1782 to 10/31/1782	Cherokee Expedition 1782	NC		x		x					x	x	x		x		x	x	x
98	9/20/1782	Battle of Lookout Mountain	TN		x													x	x	

== Staff ==
The Salisbury District Brigade had several staff positions. The forage master, quarter master, and commissary were especially important in providing troops with food and supplies when they were called outside of the Salisbury District in North Carolina.

- Forage master
  - Allin, Thomas (under general William Lee Davidson)
- Quartermaster
  - Boyd, Benjamin (Quartermaseter General)
  - Brannon, John (Quartermaseter of Issues)
  - Carr, Robert
  - Gamble, Edmund
  - Gillespie, Thomas (Quartermaster under general Rutherford)
  - Walker, Andrew
- Commissary
  - Graham, John
  - Ramsey, David
  - Scott, John (Issuing Commissary)
  - Wallace, James
  - Watson, John (stationed in Salisbury)
- Chaplain
  - Hall, James (uncertain)
- Aide-de-Camp
  - Harris, Thomas
  - Rutherford, James (son of Griffith Rutherford)
- Paymaster
  - Locke, Matthew
- Provisions Contractors
  - Roper, James
  - Sheppard, William

== See also ==
- Cherokee–American wars
- List of North Carolina militia units in the American Revolution
- List of United States militia units in the American Revolutionary War
- Rutherford Light Horse expedition
- Salisbury District, North Carolina
