= Isaac Shelby =

American politician, first and fifth Governor of Kentucky

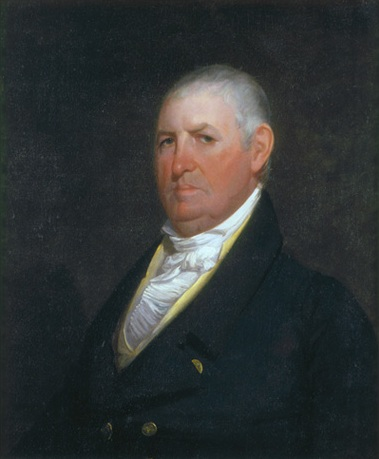
- c. 1820 portrait of Shelby

1st and 5th Governor of Kentucky
- In office August 24, 1812 – September 5, 1816
- Lieutenant: Richard Hickman
- Preceded by: Charles Scott
- Succeeded by: George Madison
- In office June 4, 1792 – June 1, 1796
- Preceded by: Position established
- Succeeded by: James Garrard

Personal details
- Born: December 11, 1750 Hagerstown, Province of Maryland
- Died: July 18, 1826 (aged 75) Lincoln County, Kentucky, U.S.
- Party: Democratic-Republican
- Spouse: Susannah Hart
- Relations: Ephraim McDowell (son-in-law); Charles Stewart Todd (son-in-law)
- Profession: soldier; colonial militia officer; state militia officer; farmer; politician; state governor
- Awards: Congressional Gold Medal; Thanks of Congress
- Nickname: Old Kings Mountain

Military service
- Allegiance: United Kingdom; United States
- Branch/service: Virginia Colonial Militia; Continental Army; Kentucky Militia
- Years of service: 1774–1815
- Rank: Governor of Kentucky
- Commands: Fincastle County company; Virginia Colonial Militia; Sullivan County Regiment, Overmountain Men; Kentucky Militia
- Battles/wars: Lord Dunmore's War; Battle of Point Pleasant; American Revolutionary War; Battle of Musgrove Mill; Battle of Kings Mountain; Siege of Ninety-Six; Battle of Cowpens; War of 1812; Battle of the Thames

Isaac Shelby (December 11, 1750 – July 18, 1826) was an American politician and military officer who was the first and fifth governor of Kentucky and served in the state legislatures of Virginia and North Carolina. He also fought in Lord Dunmore's War, the American Revolutionary War, and the War of 1812. While governor, he led the Kentucky militia in the Battle of the Thames, an action that was rewarded with a Congressional Gold Medal. Counties in nine states, and several cities and military bases, have been named in his honor. His fondness for John Dickinson's "The Liberty Song" is believed to be the reason Kentucky adopted the state motto "United we stand, divided we fall".

Shelby's military service began when he served as second-in-command to his father at the Battle of Point Pleasant, the only major battle of Lord Dunmore's War. He gained the reputation of an expert woodsman and surveyor and spent the early part of the Revolutionary War gathering supplies for the Continental Army. Later in the war, he and John Sevier led expeditions over the Appalachian Mountains against British forces in North Carolina. He played a pivotal role in the American victory at the Battle of Kings Mountain. For his service, Shelby was presented with a ceremonial sword and a pair of pistols by the North Carolina legislature, and the nickname "Old Kings Mountain" followed him the rest of his life.

Following the war, Shelby relocated to Kentucky on lands awarded to him for his military service and became involved in Kentucky's transition from a county of Virginia to a separate state. His heroism made him popular with the state's citizens, and the Kentucky electoral college unanimously elected him governor in 1792. He secured Kentucky from Indian attacks and organized its first government. He used the Citizen Genêt affair to convince the Washington administration to conclude an agreement with the Spanish Empire for free trade on the Mississippi River.

At the end of his gubernatorial term, Shelby retired from public life, but he was called back into politics by the impending War of 1812. Kentuckians urged Shelby to run for governor again and lead them through the anticipated conflict. He was elected easily and, at the request of General William Henry Harrison, commanded troops from Kentucky at the Battle of the Thames. After the war, he declined President James Monroe's offer to become Secretary of War. In his last act of public service, Shelby and Andrew Jackson acted as commissioners to negotiate the Jackson Purchase from the Chickasaw Indian tribe. Shelby died at his estate in Lincoln County, Kentucky on July 18, 1826.

== Early life ==
Isaac Shelby was born in the British colony of Maryland on December 11, 1750, near Hagerstown in Frederick (now Washington) County. He was the third child and second son of Evan and Letitia (Cox) Shelby, who immigrated from Tregaron, Wales, in 1735. Though the family had been loyal to the Church of England, they became Presbyterians after coming to British America; this was the denomination Shelby embraced during his life.

Shelby was educated at the local schools in his native colony. He worked on his father's plantation and occasionally found work as a surveyor. At age eighteen he was appointed deputy sheriff of Frederick County. Shelby's father lost a great deal of money when Pontiac's Rebellion disrupted his lucrative fur trade business, and two years later, the business' records were destroyed in a house fire. Consequently, in December 1770 the family moved to the area near Bristol, Tennessee, where they built a fort and a trading post. Here, Shelby and his father worked for three years herding cattle.

== Lord Dunmore's War ==
During Lord Dunmore's War, a border conflict between Virginian colonists and American Indians, Shelby was commissioned as a lieutenant in the Virginia militia by Colonel William Preston. As second-in-command of his father's Fincastle County company, he took part in the decisive Battle of Point Pleasant on October 10, 1774. The younger Shelby earned commendation for his skill and gallantry in this battle. The victorious militiamen erected Fort Blair on the site of the battle. They remained stationed there, with Shelby as second-in-command, until July 1775 when Lord Dunmore ordered the fort destroyed, fearing it might become useful to colonial rebels in the growing American Revolution.

== Revolutionary War ==
After his unit was disbanded, Shelby surveyed for the Transylvania Company, a land company that purchased much of present-day Kentucky from the Cherokees in a deal later invalidated by the government of Virginia. After fulfilling his duties with the Transylvania Company, he rejoined his family in Virginia, but returned to Kentucky the following year to claim and improve land for himself. After falling ill, he returned home in July 1776 to recover. Back in Virginia, fighting in the American Revolutionary War was underway, and Shelby found a commission from the Virginia Committee of Safety appointing him captain of a company of Minutemen. In 1777, Virginia governor Patrick Henry appointed Shelby to a position securing provisions for the army on the frontier. He served a similar role for units in the Continental Army in 1778 and 1779. With his money, Shelby purchased provisions for John Sevier's 1779 expedition against the Chickamauga, a band of Cherokees who were resisting colonial expansion.

Shelby was elected to represent Washington County in the Virginia House of Delegates in 1779. Later that year, he was commissioned a major by Governor Thomas Jefferson and charged with escorting a group of commissioners to establish a frontier boundary line between Virginia and North Carolina. Shortly after his arrival in the region, North Carolina Governor Richard Caswell made him magistrate of newly formed Sullivan County and elevated him to the rank of colonel of the Sullivan County Regiment.

Shelby was surveying lands in Kentucky in 1780 when he heard of the British capture of Charleston. He hurried to North Carolina, where he found a request for aid from American General Charles McDowell to defend the borders of North Carolina from British forces. Shelby assembled three hundred militiamen and joined McDowell at Cherokee Ford in South Carolina. On the morning of July 31, he surrounded the British-held Thickety Fort on the Pacolet River with 600 men. He immediately demanded a surrender, but the defenders refused. Shelby brought his men within musket range and again demanded surrender. Though the defending garrison likely would have withstood the attack, the fort's commander lost his nerve and capitulated. Without firing a shot, Shelby's men had captured 94 soldiers.

Following the surrender of Thickety Fort, Shelby joined a band of partisans under Lieutenant Elijah Clarke. This unit was pursued by British Major Patrick Ferguson, who was leading an army of Loyalists. On the morning of August 8, some of Shelby's men were gathering peaches from an orchard when they were surprised by some of Ferguson's men on a reconnaissance mission. Shelby's men quickly readied their arms and drove back the Loyalist patrol. Soon, however, the Loyalists were soon reinforced and the Americans fell back. The pattern continued, with one side being reinforced and gaining an advantage, followed by the other. Shelby's men were winning the battle when Ferguson's main force of 1,000 militiamen arrived. Outmanned, the Americans retreated to a nearby hill where enemy musket fire could not reach them. Now safe, they taunted Ferguson's troops, which withdrew from the area.

McDowell subsequently ordered Shelby and Clarke to take Musgrove's Mill, a Loyalist encampment on the Enoree River. They rode all night with two hundred men, reaching their location about dawn on August 18. The Americans had estimated the Loyalist force was of comparable size, but an advance scout brought word there were approximately 500 Loyalist troops in the camp who were preparing for battle. Shelby's men and horses were too tired for a retreat and they had lost the element of surprise. He ordered his men to construct a breastwork from nearby logs and brush. In half an hour the makeshift fortifications were complete, and 25 American cavalryman charged Musgrove's Mill to provoke an attack. The Loyalists pursued them back to the main American force. Despite being outnumbered, the Americans killed or captured 133 members of the attacking force and routed the rest.

=== Battle of Kings Mountain ===
Shelby and Clarke elected not to pursue the fleeing Loyalists. Instead, they set their sights on a British fort at Ninety Six, South Carolina, where they were sure they would find Ferguson. However, while en route, Shelby and his men were met with news of American General Horatio Gates' defeat at the Battle of Camden. Now supported by a British army under General Charles Cornwallis, Ferguson could ride to meet Shelby with his entire force, so Shelby retreated over the Appalachian Mountains into North Carolina.

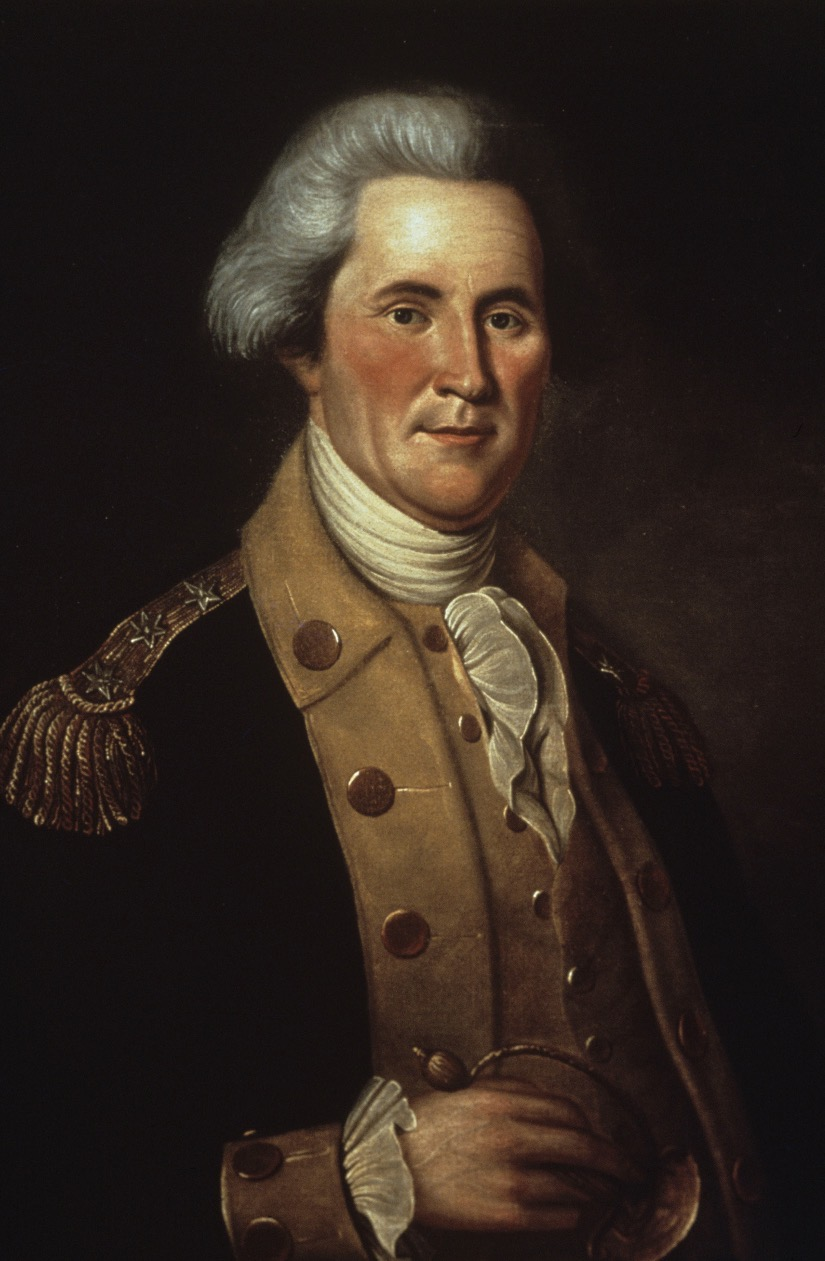
John Sevier (pictured) and Shelby led Patriot forces to victory at the Battle of Kings Mountain

Following the American retreat, an emboldened Ferguson dispatched a paroled prisoner across the mountains to warn them to cease their opposition or he would lay waste to the local countryside. Angered by this act, Shelby and John Sevier began to plan another attack against Ferguson. Shelby and Sevier raised 240 men each, and were joined by William Campbell with 400 men from Washington County, Virginia and Charles McDowell with 160 men from Burke and Rutherford counties in North Carolina. The forces mustered at Sycamore Shoals on September 25. The troops crossed the difficult terrain of the Blue Ridge Mountains and arrived at McDowell's estate near Morganton, North Carolina, on September 30. Here, they were joined by Colonel Benjamin Cleveland and Major Joseph Winston with 350 men from Surry and Wilkes counties.

The combined force pursued Ferguson's army to Kings Mountain, where it had constructed fortifications; Ferguson declared that "God Almighty and all the rebels out of hell" could not move him from it. The Battle of Kings Mountain commenced on October 7. Shelby had ordered his men to advance from tree to tree, firing from behind each one; he called this technique "Indian play" because he had seen the Indians use it in battles with them. Ferguson ordered bayonet charges that forced Shelby's men to fall back on three separate occasions, but the Americans dislodged the Loyalists from their position. Seeing the battle was lost, Ferguson and his most senior officers attempted a retreat. However, the Americans were instructed to kill Ferguson, and simultaneous shots by Sevier's men broke both Ferguson's arms, fatally pierced his skull, and knocked him from his mount. Seeing their commander dead, the remaining Loyalists waved white flags of surrender.

Kings Mountain was the high point of Shelby's military service, and from that point forward his men dubbed him "Old Kings Mountain". The North Carolina legislature passed a vote of thanks to Shelby and Sevier for their service and ordered each be presented a pair of pistols and a ceremonial sword. (Shelby did not receive these items until he requested them from the legislature in 1813.)

As the Americans and their prisoners began the march from Kings Mountain, they learned that nine American prisoners of war had been hanged at Fort Ninety-Six. This was not the first such incident in the region, and the enraged Americans vowed they would now put a stop to any more hangings in the Carolinas. Summoning a jury from their number – which was legal because two North Carolina magistrates were present – the Americans selected random prisoners of war and charged them with crimes ranging from theft to arson to murder. By evening, the jury had convicted 36 prisoners and sentenced them to hang. After the first nine hangings, however, Shelby ordered them stopped. He never gave a reason for this action, but his order was obeyed nonetheless, and the remaining "convicts" rejoined their fellow prisoners.

The victorious Americans and their prisoners returned to McDowell's estate on the morning of October 10. From there, the various commanders and their men went their separate ways. Shelby and his men joined General Daniel Morgan at New Providence, South Carolina. While there, Shelby advised Morgan to take Fort Ninety-Six and Augusta, because he believed the British forces there were supplying the Cherokee with weapons for their raids against American settlers. Morgan agreed to the plan, as did Gates, the commander-in-chief of American forces in the region. Assured that his plan would be carried out, Shelby returned home and promised to return the following spring with 300 men. On his way to Fort Ninety-Six, Morgan was attacked by a British army under Colonel Banastre Tarleton and gained a decisive victory over it at the Battle of Cowpens. Shelby later lamented the fact, that General Nathanael Greene, who relieved Gates only days after Shelby departed for home, claimed the lion's share of the credit for Cowpens, when it was Shelby's plan that had put Morgan in the position to begin with.

=== Later wartime service and settlement in Kentucky ===
Upon his return home, Shelby and his father were named commissioners to negotiate a treaty between the United States and Chickamauga. This service delayed his return to Greene, but in October 1781 he and Sevier led 600 riflemen to join Greene in South Carolina. Greene had thought to use Shelby's and Sevier's men to prevent Cornwallis from returning to Charleston. However, Cornwallis was defeated at the siege of Yorktown, shortly after Shelby and Sevier arrived, and Greene sent them on to join General Francis Marion on the Pee Dee River. On Marion's orders, Shelby and Colonel Hezekiah Maham captured a British fort at Fair Lawn near Moncks Corner on November 27, 1781.

While still in the field, Shelby was elected to the House of Commons of the North Carolina General Assembly. He requested and was granted a leave of absence from the Army to attend the legislative session of December 1781. He was re-elected in 1782 and attended the April session of the legislature that year. In early 1783, he was chosen as a commissioner to survey preemption claims of soldiers along the Cumberland River.

Shelby returned to Kentucky in April 1783, settling at Boonesborough. He married Susannah Hart on April 19, 1783; the couple had eleven children. Their eldest daughter, Sarah, married Dr. Ephraim McDowell, and the youngest daughter, Letitia, married future Kentucky secretary of state Charles Stewart Todd. On November 1, 1783, the family moved to Lincoln County, near Knob Lick, and occupied land awarded to Shelby for his military service. Shelby was named one of the first trustees of Transylvania Seminary (later Transylvania University) in 1783, and on December 1, 1787, founded the Kentucky Society for the Promotion of Useful Knowledge.

Shelby began working to secure Kentucky's separation from Virginia as early as 1784. That year, he attended a convention to consider leading an expedition against the Indians and separating Kentucky from Virginia. He was a delegate to subsequent conventions in 1787, 1788, and 1789 that worked toward a constitution for Kentucky. During these conventions he helped thwart James Wilkinson's scheme to align Kentucky with the Spanish. In 1791 Shelby, Charles Scott and Benjamin Logan were among those chosen by the Virginia legislature to serve on the Board of War for the district of Kentucky. Shelby was also made High Sheriff on Lincoln County. In 1792, he was a delegate to the final convention that framed the first Kentucky Constitution.

== First term as governor ==
Under the new constitution, the voters chose electors who then elected the governor and members of the Kentucky Senate. Though there is no indication that Shelby actively sought the office of governor, he was elected unanimously to that post by the electors on May 17, 1791. He took office on June 4, 1792, the day the state was admitted to the Union. Though not actively partisan, he identified with the Democratic-Republicans. Much of his term was devoted to establishing basic laws, military divisions and a tax structure.

One of Shelby's chief concerns was securing federal aid to defend the frontier. Although Kentuckians were engaged in an undeclared war with American Indians north of the Ohio River, Shelby had been ordered by Secretary of War Henry Knox not to conduct offensive military actions against the Indians. Furthermore, he was limited by federal regulations that restricted the service of state militiamen to thirty days, which was too short to be effective. With the meager resources of his fledgling state he was only able to defend the most vulnerable areas from Indian attack. Meanwhile, Kentuckians suspected that the Indians were being goaded and armed by British agents.

Shelby appealed to President Washington for help; Washington responded by appointing General "Mad" Anthony Wayne to the area with orders to push the Indians out of the Northwest Territory. Wayne arrived at Fort Washington (present-day Cincinnati, Ohio) in May 1793, but was prevented from taking any immediate action because federal commissioners were still attempting to negotiate a treaty with the Indians. He called for 1,000 volunteer troops from Kentucky, but few heeded the call and Shelby resorted to conscription. By the time the soldiers arrived, winter had set in. He ordered the men to go home and return in the spring.

After a winter filled with Indian attacks, including one which claimed the life of Shelby's younger brother Evan Shelby III, Kentucky militia units won some minor victories over the Indians in early 1794. In spring the response to Wayne's call for troops was more enthusiastic; 1,600 volunteers mustered at Fort Greenville and were hastily trained. By August 1794, Wayne was on the offensive against the Indians and dealt them a decisive blow at the August 20, 1794 Battle of Fallen Timbers. This victory, and the ensuing Treaty of Greenville, secured the territory, and although Shelby did not agree with some of the restrictions placed upon American settlers by this treaty, he abided by its terms and enforced those that were under his jurisdiction.

Another major concern of the Shelby administration was free navigation on the Mississippi River, which was vital to the state's economic interests. For political reasons the Spanish had closed the port at New Orleans to the Americans. This would have been the natural market for the tobacco, flour and hemp grown by Kentucky farmers; overland routes were too expensive to be profitable. This made it difficult for land speculators to entice immigration to the area to turn a profit on their investments. Many Kentuckians felt the federal government was not acting decisively or quickly enough to remedy this situation.

=== Citizen Genêt affair ===
While Kentuckians held hostile views towards Britain and Spain, they maintained a strong affinity towards France. Kentuckians admired the republican government that had arisen from the French Revolution, and they had not forgotten France's aid during the Revolutionary War. When French Ambassador Edmond-Charles Genêt, popularly known as Citizen Genêt, arrived in the United States in April 1793, George Rogers Clark was already considering an expedition to capture Spanish lands in the west. Genêt's agent, André Michaux, was dispatched to Kentucky to assess the support of Kentuckians toward Clark's expedition. When he gained an audience with Governor Shelby, he did so with letters of introduction from Secretary of State Thomas Jefferson and Kentucky Senator John Brown.

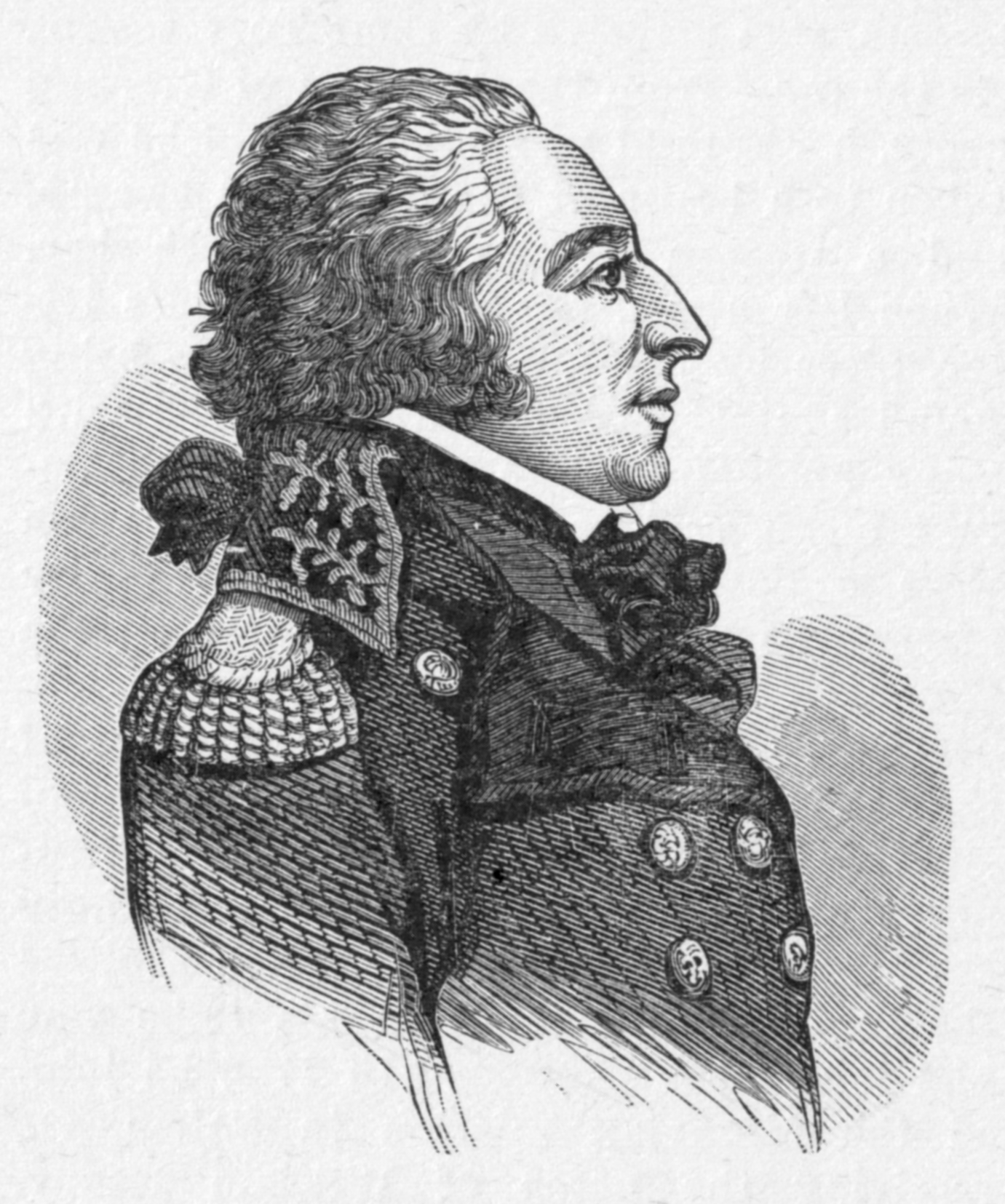
Edmond-Charles Genêt – Shelby was warned not to aid his schemes.

Jefferson had written a separate letter to Shelby warning him against aiding the French schemes and informing him that negotiations were under way with the Spanish regarding trade on the Mississippi. When the letter was sent on August 29, 1793, it was Jefferson's intent that it reach Shelby before Michaux did, but Shelby did not receive it until October 1793. On September 13, 1793, Michaux met with Shelby, but there is no evidence that Shelby agreed to help him. In his response to Jefferson's delayed letter, Shelby assured Jefferson that Kentuckians "possess too just a sense of the obligation they owe the General Government, to embark in any enterprise that would be so injurious to the United States".

In November 1793, Shelby received a letter from another of Genêt's agents, Charles Delpeau. He confided to Shelby that he had been sent to secure supplies for an expedition against Spanish holdings, and inquired whether Shelby had been instructed to arrest individuals associated with such a scheme. Three days later Shelby responded by letter, relating Jefferson's warning against aiding the French. Despite having no evidence that Shelby was party to Genêt's scheme, both Jefferson and Knox felt compelled to warn him a second time. Jefferson provided names and descriptions of the French agents believed to be in Kentucky and encouraged their arrest. Knox went a step further by suggesting Kentucky would be reimbursed for any costs incurred resisting the French by force, should such action become necessary. General Anthony Wayne informed him that his cavalry was at the state's disposal. Arthur St. Clair, governor of the American Northwest Territory, also admonished Shelby against cooperation with Genêt.

In his response to Jefferson, Shelby questioned whether he had the legal authority to intervene with force against his constituency and expressed his personal aversion to doing so.

I shall upon all occasions be averse to the exercise of any power which I do not consider myself as being clearly and explicitly invested with, much less would I assume power to exercise it against men whom I consider as friends and brethren, in favor of a man whom I view as an enemy and a tyrant [the king of Spain]. I shall also feel but little inclination to take an active part in punishing or restraining any of my fellow-citizens for a supposed intention only to gratify or remove the fears of the ministers of a foreign prince, who openly withholds from us an invaluable right [navigation of the Mississippi] and who secretly instigates against us a most savage and cruel enemy.

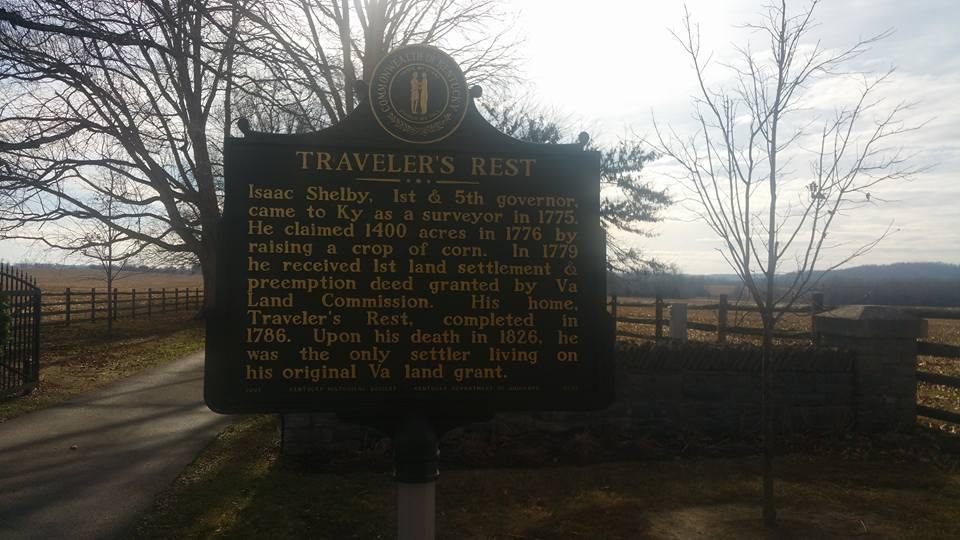
Kentucky Historical Marker#2233, Traveler's Rest

Shelby tempered this lukewarm commitment by assuring Jefferson that "I shall, at all times, hold it my duty to perform whatever may be constitutionally required of me, as Governor of Kentucky, by the President of the United States." In March 1794, perhaps in response to Shelby's concerns, Congress passed a measure granting the government additional powers in the event of an invasion or insurrection. Jefferson's successor Edmund Randolph, who actually received Shelby's letter, wrote Shelby to inform him of the new powers at his disposal, and informing him that the new regime in France had recalled Genêt. Two months later Genêt's agents ceased their operations in Kentucky and the potential crisis was averted. In 1795, President Washington negotiated an agreement with the Spanish that secured the right of Americans to trade on the river. Having successfully dealt with the major challenges and issues involved in forming a new state government, Shelby left the state safe and financially sound. Shelby retired to Traveler's Rest, his Lincoln County estate, at the conclusion of his term in 1796. For the next 15 years he tended to affairs on his farm. He was selected as a presidential elector in six consecutive elections, but these were his only appearances in public life during this period.

== Second term as governor ==
Gabriel Slaughter was the favorite choice for governor of Kentucky in 1812. Only one impediment to his potential candidacy existed. Growing tensions between the United States, France, and Britain threatened to break into open war. With this prospect looming, Isaac Shelby's name began circulating as a possible candidate for governor. Slaughter, who lived near Shelby, visited him and asked whether he would run. Shelby assured him that he had no desire to do so unless a national emergency that required his leadership emerged. Satisfied with this answer, Slaughter began his campaign. Anglo-American relations grew worse, and on June 18, 1812, the United States declared war on Britain, beginning the War of 1812. Cries grew louder for Shelby to return as Kentucky's chief executive. On July 18, 1812, less than a month before the election, Shelby acquiesced and announced his candidacy.

During the campaign Shelby's political enemies, notably Humphrey Marshall, criticized his response to Jefferson's second letter regarding the Genêt affair and questioned his loyalty to the United States. Shelby contended that his noncommittal response to the letter was meant to draw the federal government's attention to the situation in the west. He cited the agreement between Washington and the Spanish as evidence that his ploy had worked. He also claimed to have known at the time he wrote the letter that the French scheme was destined to fail.

Slaughter's supporters mocked Shelby's advanced age (he was almost 62), calling him "Old Daddy Shelby". One Kentucky paper even printed an anonymous charge that Shelby had run from the Battle of Kings Mountain. Though few even among Shelby's enemies believed the story, his supporters and Shelby himself responded through missives in the state's newspapers. One supporter typified these responses, writing "It is reported that Colonel Shelby 'run [sic] at Kings Mountain.' True he did. He first run [sic] up to the enemy ... then after an action of about forty-seven minutes, he run [sic] again with 900 prisoners." As the canvass stretched into August, Shelby grew more confident of victory and began preparations to return to the state house. He predicted a victory of 10,000 votes; the final margin was more than 17,000. When he took the oath of office, Shelby became the first Kentucky governor to serve non-consecutive terms. (James Garrard had been permitted to serve consecutive terms in 1796 and 1800 by special legislative exemption.)

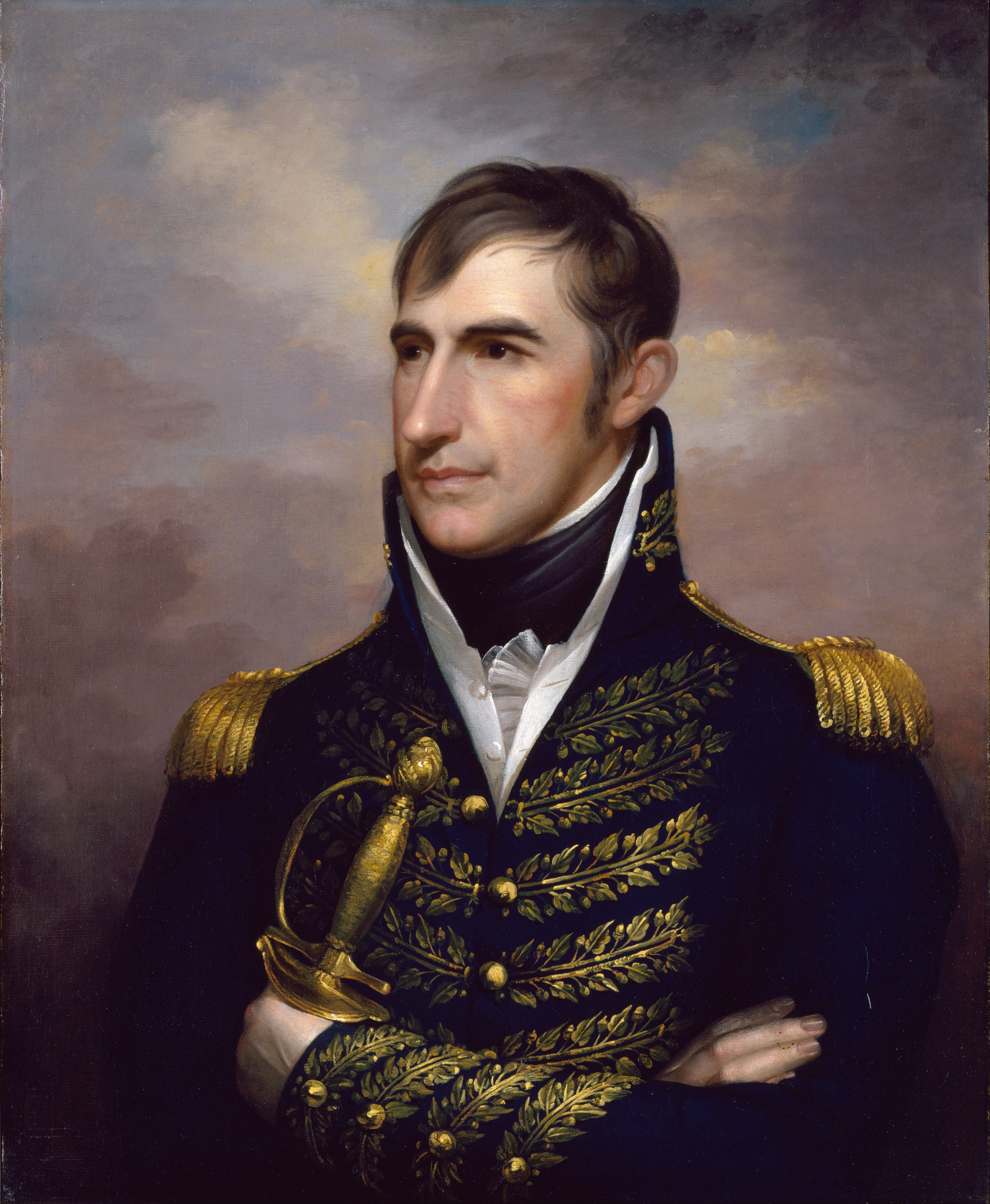
William Henry Harrison was Shelby's choice to lead the federal forces in the Northwest during the War of 1812.

Preparations for the war dominated Shelby's second term. Two days before his inauguration, he and outgoing governor Charles Scott met at the state house to appoint William Henry Harrison commander of the Kentucky militia. This was done in violation of a constitutional mandate that the post be held by a native Kentuckian. Already commander of the militias of Indiana and Illinois, Harrison picked up Kentucky volunteers at Newport before hurrying to the defense of Fort Wayne.

Shelby pressured President James Madison to give Harrison command of all military forces in the Northwest. Madison acceded, rescinding his earlier appointment of James Winchester. On the state level, Shelby revised militia laws to make every male between the ages of 18 and 45 eligible for military service; ministers were excluded from the provision. Seven thousand volunteers enlisted, and many more had to be turned away. Shelby encouraged the state's women to sew and knit items for Kentucky's troops.

Shelby's confidence in the federal government's war planning was shaken by the disastrous Battle of Frenchtown in which a number of Kentucky soldiers died. He vowed to personally act to aid the war effort should the opportunity arise, and was authorized by the legislature to do so. In March 1813, Harrison requested another 1,200 Kentuckians to join him at Fort Meigs. Shelby dispatched the requested number, among whom was his oldest son James, under General Green Clay. The reinforcements arrived to find Fort Meigs under siege by a combined force of British and Indians. Clay's force was able to stop the siege, but a large number of them were captured and massacred by Indians. Initial reports put James Shelby among the dead, but he was later discovered to have been captured and released in a prisoner exchange.

On July 30, 1813, General Harrison again wrote Shelby requesting volunteers, and this time he asked that Shelby lead them personally. Shelby raised a force of 3,500 volunteers, double the number Harrison requested. Future governor John J. Crittenden served as Shelby's aide-de-camp. Now a Major General, Shelby led the volunteers to join Harrison in a campaign that culminated in the American victory at the Battle of the Thames.

In Harrison's report of the battle to Secretary of War John Armstrong Jr., he said of Shelby, "I am at a loss to how to mention [the service] of Governor Shelby, being convinced that no eulogism of mine can reach his merit." In 1817, Shelby received the thanks of Congress and was awarded the Congressional Gold Medal for his service in the war. Friends of Shelby suggested he run for Vice President, but Shelby quickly and emphatically declined.

== Later life ==
Upon Shelby's leaving office in 1816, President Monroe offered him the post of Secretary of War, but he declined because of his age. Already a founding member of the Kentucky Bible Society, Shelby consented to serve as vice-president of the New American Bible Society in 1816. He was a faithful member of Danville Presbyterian church, but in 1816, built a small nondenominational church on his property. In 1818, he accompanied Andrew Jackson in negotiating the Jackson Purchase with the Chickasaw. He also served as the first president of the Kentucky Agricultural Society in 1818 and was chairman of the first board of trustees of Centre College in 1819.

== Death ==
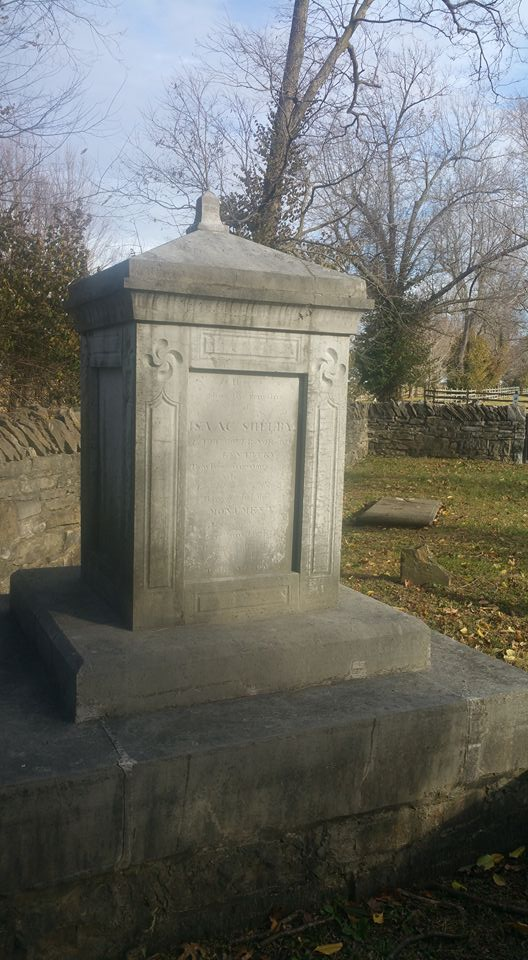
Shelby's grave

In 1820, Isaac Shelby was stricken with paralysis in his right arm and leg. He died of a stroke on July 18, 1826, at his home in Lincoln County. Shelby was a slaveowner, and left slaves to his children in his will. He was buried on the grounds of his estate, Traveller's Rest. The state erected a monument over his grave in 1827. In 1952, the Shelby family cemetery was given to the state government and became the Isaac Shelby Cemetery State Historic Site.

== Legacy ==
Shelby's patriotism is believed to have inspired the Kentucky state motto: "United we stand, divided we fall". He was fond of The Liberty Song, a 1768 composition by John Dickinson, which contains the line "They join in hand, brave Americans all, By uniting we stand, by dividing we fall." Though he is sometimes credited with designing the state seal, his public papers show that the design was suggested by James Wilkinson.

Centre College began awarding the Isaac Shelby Medallion in 1972, and since then, it has become the college's most prestigious honor. Those awarded the Medallion exemplify the ideals of service to Centre and dedication to the public good that were embraced by Shelby during his time at Centre and in Kentucky.

=== Places named for Isaac Shelby ===
Nine states have a county named after Shelby, as do numerous cities and military installations.

Counties

- Shelby County, Alabama
- Shelby County, Illinois
- Shelby County, Indiana
- Shelby County, Iowa
- Shelby County, Kentucky
- Shelby County, Missouri
- Shelby County, Ohio
- Shelby County, Tennessee
- Shelby County, Texas

Military installations

- Camp Shelby, Mississippi
- Fort Shelby, Michigan
- Fort Shelby, Wisconsin

Cities and towns

- Shelby, Oceana County, Michigan
- Shelby, New York
- Shelby, North Carolina
- Shelby, Ohio
- Shelby Charter Township, Macomb County, Michigan
- Shelbyville, Illinois
- Shelbyville, Indiana
- Shelbyville, Kentucky
- Shelbyville, Missouri
- Shelbyville, Tennessee
- Shelbyville, Texas

== See also ==
- Overmountain Men
- Battle of the Thames
- Jackson Purchase

Political offices
Preceded by (none)	Governor of Kentucky; 1792–1796	Succeeded by James Garrard
Preceded by Charles Scott	Governor of Kentucky; 1812–1816	Succeeded by George Madison
