= Charles McDowell (militiaman) =

American soldier and politician (1743–1815)

Brigadier General Charles McDowell
- Born: Charles McDowell; October 18, 1743; Winchester, Virginia
- Died: March 31, 1815 (aged 71); Burke County, North Carolina, US
- Burial place: Quaker Meadows Cemetery, Morganton, North Carolina
- Spouse: Grace Grizzell Greenlee McDowell (1750–1823)
- Military career
- Allegiance: United States
- Branch: North Carolina militia
- Service years: 1775-1783
- Rank: brigadier general
- Unit: 1. 2nd Rowan County Regiment; 2. Burke County Regiment; 3. Morgan District Brigade
- Commands: 1. Burke County Regiment, militia 2. Morgan District Brigade

Charles McDowell (1743–1815) was a Brigadier General of the Morgan District Brigade of the North Carolina Militia during the American Revolution, state senator, and County Justice of Peace in Burke County, North Carolina.

== Early life ==
Charles McDowell was born on October 18, 1743, in Winchester, Frederick County, Virginia. He was the son of Joseph McDowell, an Ulster-Scot, and Margaret O'Neil McDowell, an Irish woman. He and his brother Joseph McDowell Jr. (1756-1801) moved with his parent to the area called Quaker Meadows in Rowan County, North Carolina (became Burke County in 1777).

== Military service ==
He served as an officer in the North Carolina militia during the American Revolution. He was involved in many skirmishes with the Cherokee during the war.

- Captain in the 2nd Rowan County Regiment of militia (1775-1776)
- Lt. Colonel in the 2nd Rowan County Regiment of Militia (1776-1777)
- Colonel over the Burke County Regiment of militia (1777-1782), first and only commander
- Brigadier General of the Morgan District Brigade of militia (1782-1783), first and only commandant

== Post war ==
Before the war, he served in the state senate of the North Carolina House of Commons in 1777 and 1778. As the war ended, he took up service again and served as a state senator from 1782 to 1789. He was one of three commissioners chosen to lay off the county seat, Morganton, in Burke County in 1784. He was in favor of the federal constitution and participated in the North Carolina United States Constitution conventions in 1788 and 1789.

He died on March 31, 1815, and was buried at the Quaker Meadows Cemetery in Morganton.
