= Evan Shelby =

Colonial-era American General

Evan Shelby (c. 1719 or 1720 – 4 December 1794) was a Welsh-American trapper and militia officer in the Washington District Regiment of the North Carolina militia on the frontier of the Southern colonies.

== Early life ==
Evan Shelby was born in Tregaron, Cardiganshire, Wales, in 1720 (some sources give 1719). His father was also Evan Shelby; his mother was Catherine Davies Morgan. The family moved to the American colonies in about 1734, settling first in Pennsylvania, but later moving to Maryland. The younger Evan worked on a farm near Frederick, Maryland, named "Mountain of Wales".

== On the American frontier ==
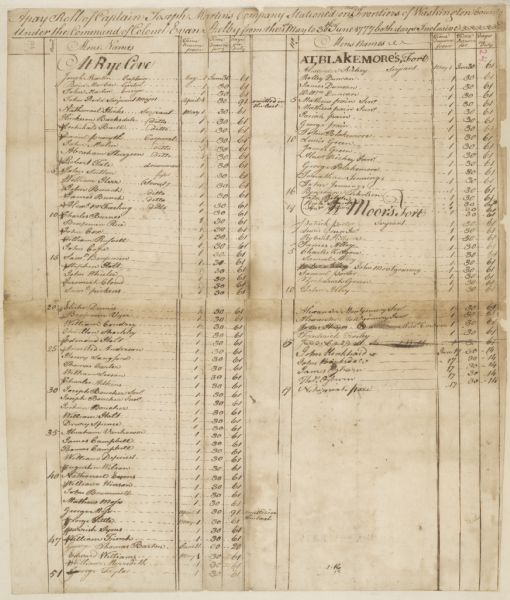
Handwritten pay roll by Captain Joseph Martin enumerating the soldiers stationed at the frontiers of Washington County, North Carolina, under the command of Colonel Evan Shelby of the Washington District Regiment, 1777. From the Lyman Draper Manuscripts, General Joseph Martin papers, Wisconsin Historical Society, Madison, Wisconsin.

Shelby served as a captain, scout, and surveyor in the French and Indian War, and was present at the fall of Fort Duquesne. In the 1770s, he built a fort, store, and trading station near the Virginia/North Carolina border, near present-day Bristol, Tennessee, which included perhaps the first distillery in the region. He led a militia group to the Kanawha River site of the Battle of Point Pleasant during Lord Dunmore's War.

Military service record:

- Major in the Virginia Militia, 1775–1776
- Colonel in the Washington District Regiment of the North Carolina militia, 1776–1777
- Colonel in the Washington County Regiment of the North Carolina militia, 1777–1783

Shelby signed the Fincastle Resolutions and actively supported the war for American independence, serving on a boycott committee and eventually taking the lead in defending Virginia's western frontier. He rose to the rank of colonel in 1777, in raids against the Chickamauga. In 1787, he became a brigadier general in western North Carolina, and was even elected governor of the State of Franklin, a post which he declined.

== Personal life ==
Shelby married twice; his first wife was Letitia Cox, with whom he was the parent of five sons and three daughters. Their son Isaac Shelby was later the governor of Kentucky. Letitia Cox Shelby died in 1777. There were three more children born into Evan Shelby's second marriage, to Isabella Elliot, in 1787.

Evan Shelby died in 1794, age 74. His current gravesite is in East Hill Cemetery in Bristol, Tennessee. The Shelby Family Papers are archived in the Library of Congress.

There is a chapter of the Daughters of the American Revolution named for General Shelby, in Owensboro, Kentucky. Another D. A. R. chapter is named for his first wife.
