= Cherokee Expedition =

The Cherokee Expedition, also known as Christie's Campaign, was a military offensive that occurred during the American Revolutionary War between American forces and Cherokee tribes allied to Great Britain.

The British encouraged and facilitated Cherokee raids in July 1776, into Colonial territories of Virginia, North and South Carolina, and Georgia to wreak havoc among the southern colonies. The state governments responded with a plan for retaliation throughout Cherokee territory.

The main force of 1,800 Virginian volunteers under Colonel William Christian marched southwest passed the Northern Cherokee border, while the Georgians attacked north through the Southern border of Cherokee lands. Brigadier General Griffith Rutherford was given command of North Carolina militia and joined up with South Carolina militia under Colonel Andrew Williamson. This attack group aimed at the central heart of Cherokee lands.

The Cherokee were divided in their plan of action, the elders and majority of the nation seeking peace terms from the Colonials, while a rogue faction, composed mostly of younger men, continued its raids and war with the Colonials. However, these elements fled from any major engagements with the invading force.

The expedition was met with little resistance as it marched into the heart of Cherokee lands in what is now Tennessee. It camped near several Cherokee towns and rebuilt abandoned forts to establish a long term presence. This show of force, although minimal, was enough to discourage further Cherokee raids during the American Revolution. It is likely that terms were made and the expedition returned home in December 1776.

== See also ==
- Cherokee–American wars
- Southern theater of the American Revolutionary War
- Indian Reserve (1763)
