= Southern Campaigns: Pension Transactions =

Southern Campaigns: Pension Transactions refer to the years after the Revolutionary War, when there are thought to have existed around 80,000 pension applications from soldiers who fought in the Southern Campaigns of the American Revolution. The United States Government spent countless years implementing and amending pension laws for Continental soldiers. The first pension legislation passed in August 1776 while the last one passed in 1878. Most rejected pensions were due to a lack of service, however, in some cases soldiers were rejected due to their skin color. Native Americans who served, for example, were not rewarded properly for their service. In a recent project, historians Will Graves and C. Leon Harris, started to transcribe the pensions of the Southern Campaigns. This long and gruesome process was started in 2006 and continues today. When investigating these pensions, there is no question that some of them reveal fraud in the pension system. Nevertheless, the pension applications provide historians unique access into soldier rosters and battles during the Revolutionary War.

== Pension Legislation ==
British colonies in North America have provided pensions for soldier's years prior to the Revolutionary War for more than a century. It wasn't until the war broke out that the United States government provided three types of pensions for soldiers during the war: A disability pension was granted to a soldier who was injured in the line of duty, a service pension was granted to any veteran who could prove their years served, and a widow pension was granted to women whose husbands were killed in the war.

In the American colonies, the first pension legislation was passed on August 26, 1776. The Continental Congress agreed on half pay for soldiers who were now unable to make a living due to repercussions from the war such as injuries or illness. Two years later in May 1778, Washington called for, and Congress confirmed, that all soldiers who stayed in service through the end of the war should receive half pay for seven years. Similarly in 1780, Congress also confirmed that widows of soldiers should receive the same benefit as enlisted men who served through the end of the war. These pensions were established not only to prevent resignation of soldiers but also to recruit more.

On June 7, 1785, a resolution passed in which the states adopted a method of providing for invalid pensioners. This was Washington's request as more and more soldiers were resigning in order to provide for their families. In September 1789, the first United States Congress declared they would continue to pay invalid pensions that were previously paid by states. Later in 1792, Congress permitted veterans to apply the Federal Government directly for invalid pensions. Finally in April 1806 to supersede invalid-pension legislation, enlisted men of state troops and militia service now had the ability to receive Federal pensions.

Not until 1818, forty-two years after the end of the war, did Congress decide to grant pensions to non-disabled soldiers. Under the act of 1818, soldiers were eligible to apply for pensions if they had served in the Continental Army, the Navy, or the Marines for at least nine months, and could prove it. These pensions would be available for life. To no surprise, pension applications soared into congress following this act. Financial problems quickly arose in the government as people were clearly starting to fraud the system to get benefits.

In an attempt to reduce fraud, Congress passed a remedial legislation on May 1, 1820 in which pensioners were now forced to give documentation of his estate and income to the Secretary of War, who would then decide if this person legitimately needed a pension. This dramatically reduced the pensioners by thousands, as many of them were illiterate. In May 1823, Congress granted full pay pensions to surviving officers and enlisted men who eligible who served through the end of the war. Later in 1832, a service-pension act provided that every officer or enlisted man who had served at least two years in the Continental or State troops was now eligible for a full pay pension for life. These pensions could be collected by the veteran's widow or children and did not call for the veteran to show need to receive it.

On July 7, 1838, widows of enlisted men were eligible for five-year pensions if their marriage was proven to be before January 1, 1794. Congress amended this law ten years later in which they pushed the marriage date back to January 2, 1800.

In 1878, there would be lifetime benefits to any widow whose husband served at least fourteen days in the Revolution. The last of the Revolutionary pensioners had died by 1867, however there were still 887 widows on the pension rolls as of 1869, ninety-three years after the British surrender in the war. The total pension cost to the federal government in 1869 was $46,178,000.

=== Number of Pensioned Soldiers ===
Act of 1818	20,485
Act of 1828	1,200
Act of 1832	33,425
Other Acts	2,153
TOTAL	57,263

== Fraud ==
Fraud is more than just a possibility in these pension statements as there were 80,000 plus known pension applications. While Congress’ act of 1818 and 1820 discouraged military resignation and encouraged enlistment, it also allowed for poor colonists who did not serve to get fraud pensions from the United States Government. The pension office most commonly rejected pension applications because the soldier had not served nine months in the war. A small percentage of pension claims were rejected because the soldier's name was not found on a roster. Widows often got rejected when they could not prove the date of their marriage with a veteran. Although these rejections were plentiful, there is no question the fraud pension statements were accepted by the pension office. So can the system be trusted especially decades after the war had ended? The short answer is yes. The pension application procedure required the applicant to appear before a court and describe under oath his or her service. Also, there exist many historical records that contain names of officers, battles, and places that are compared with pension statements. Veterans who actually served usually kept the war alive by talking about it with family and friends. As mentioned above, a lot of enlisted men as well as widows were illiterate which most likely means they had no documentation of their service. In a random sample held by Graves and Harris, only one pension application of two hundred turned out to be fraud because the applicant tried to impersonate a soldier who had already died.

=== Washington Singleton's "fraud check" ===
In 1834, the War Department Pension Office became suspicious of fraud attempts following the Pension Act of 1832. The new U.S. District Attorney in Lewis County, West Virginia, Washington G. Singleton, began investigating pension applicants one-on-one. As most men were illiterate, they could not refresh their memory by reading their pension statement. Singleton's reports were eye opening. In Lewis County alone, he judged sixty three of eighty eight pensions to be fraudulent and in the rest of West Virginia he deemed fifty six percent of pension applications fraudulent. Singleton claimed the pension agents were crooked. Turns out, Singleton may have been the crooked one. His judgement seemed to be impaired on many pension applications. For example, in the application of Thomas Smith (S15989 revwarapps.org), Singleton stated that Smith had "but a small portion of mind," concluding that "he never done one particle of service in my opinion." The pension commissioner, Col. James L. Edwards seemed to take Singleton's word blindly. As a result, about four dozen applicants were charged with fraud and denied pensions. However, when looking at the Lewis County files, 181 reliable files that proved service. Harries claims that of the 181 cases, 154 (85%) showed a close agreement between the narratives and the pension applications. In this case, only 8 of 181 (4%) pension applications were fraud.

== Transcription Process ==
In July 2006, Historians Will Graves and C. Leon Harris along with the Southern Campaigns of the American Revolution (SCAR) decided to establish a huge research project. Graves began the project by transcribing pension applications from Georgia, South Carolina, North Carolina, and Virginia. Attempting to transcribe the Revolution pension statements from all of the colonies seemed unrealistic at first, however they have additionally completed transcribing pensions from Maryland, Delaware, and Pennsylvania, and have started pensions from New Jersey and New York. Harris and Graves hope to transcribe pensions of the North during their lifetime. In the transcription process, Will uses speech recognition software to transcribe the documents. The Southern Campaigns contain many crucial battles and are seen as a turning point in the war. After years of digging up pension statements with the help of other historians, they began to transcribe these historic documents. From studying various rosters, Harris estimates that one in every six Continental soldiers applied for pensions. They encourage anyone interested to help with the project. On http://revwarapps.org, there are now 21,376 pensions available online. There are estimated to be just over 80,000 total pension statements, so it is remarkable to have transcribed over one fourth of them. Each pension statement contains a letter followed by a number on the top of it. Graves and Harris explain exactly what these letters indicate:

- -BLWt: Application for a warrant for bounty land promised to soldiers who served to the end of the war.
- -R: Rejected claim usually; or less often a claim for half-pay for life by a Virginia veteran.
- -S: Application by a surviving soldier whose widow did not apply.
- -X: File number formerly assigned by HeritageQuest because federal file lacked a number.
- -NC, SC, GA, VAS, etc.: Application was to a state but transferred to federal jurisdiction.
- -VAS: Virginia application for pension by disabled soldier or widow, or application for bounty land.
- -W: Application by a widow, either with a soldier's application or by itself.

=== Pension Uses ===
Pension Applications are very important documents in American history. As service documentation during the Revolutionary War was limited, the pensions provide thousands of soldiers service records, although a chunk of them are fraudulent. Historians like Harris and Graves use these pensions to learn more about soldiers and battles of the Revolution. For example, in trying to distinguish whether the Massacre at Waxhaws was actually a massacre, they looked at pensions from soldiers who fought in the battle. While only two of the 134 survivors described it as a "massacre" (William Crayton V AS1744 and William King S38121:revwarrapps.com), there were other pensioners who described something similar to a massacre. Samuel Gilmoore (VAS391) received "twenty-two wounds from the enemy, most of which were with broad sword," demonstrating the horror of this massacre. Pension applications can be used in many different ways to discover more about the Revolutionary War.

== Native American Pensions ==
Not until on March 3, 1855, seventy two years after the war ended, were Native Americans able to apply for pensions. Pension applications were ultimately decided by a court meaning that many of the decisions were biased or racist. Non-white pension applications, especially Native American soldiers, were commonly rejected. Even the soldiers who fought against Natives during the Revolution were unable to receive pensions. Singleton even persuaded Edwards that soldiers who were fighting Native American soldiers on the Virginia frontier should be denied pensions because that was not "real military service."

Here is a few Native Americans that applied for pensions:

- HARMON, CHARLES, aka GREYHORSE, Cherokee Indian, W7645, Bedford County, Virginia
- LOYD, ROBIN, Indian, R650l, Dinwiddie County, Virginia also listed as INDIAN ROBIN
- BROOKS, JOHN, Lumbee Indian, S6732, BLWt 80030‐160‐55, RNC:608, HEI‐2, Robeson County, North Carolina
- BELL, RICHARD, Lumbee Indian, W25231 [wife Candis reported in W25231 that he died August 6, 1848], RNC:453, OLIK, Anson County, North Carolina res. Randolph County, North Carolina

In Robin Loyd's pension application, he provides the court with a long, descriptive account of his one-year service for the Continental Army. He includes the specific dates of when he entered and departed the service as well as the places he fought during that year. Loyd was still rejected of his pension, probably because of his skin color.

== See also ==
- Southern theater of the American Revolutionary War
- United States House Committee on Revolutionary Pensions
- John Gray (American Revolutionary War soldier), last living pensioner
- Daniel F. Bakeman, last living pensioner but with unproven service record
- Esther S. Damon, the last pensioned widow, widow of Noah Damon of Vermont (pension application
