= Rowan Resolves =

Rowan Resolves is the short name for a colonial era document called Resolutions by inhabitants of Rowan County concerning resistance to Parliamentary taxation and the Provincial Congress of North Carolina. It was signed in Salisbury, Rowan County, in the royal Province of North Carolina on August 8, 1774 in response to a series of punitive laws passed by the British Parliament in 1774, the Intolerable Acts, after the political protest against the Tea Act in Boston, the Colony of Massachusetts Bay, commonly known as Boston Tea Party. Rowan County was the first county in North Carolina to adopt such resolutions in the early stages of the American Revolution.

== Discovery ==
The document was discovered in Iredell County in 1851 among the papers of the Sharpe family which were direct descendants of William Sharpe, the last Secretary of the Rowan County Committee of Safety. The document was first published to the general public by Colonel Wheeler. Authenticity of the document was asserted by a committee of experts before the publication.

== Summary ==
The freeholders of Rowan County opened the document with the assertion of their fidelity and obedience to King George III and his right to the Crown of Great Britain and Dominions in America. Then the authors proceeded to state their position on the recent Royal measures in response to the economic and political events in the colonies.

- The right to impose taxes on the colonists lies within the jurisdiction of the General Assembly of the province (as opposed to the legislature in England)
- Imposition of taxes by any authority other than the General Assembly is an infringement upon the constitutional rights and liberties of the colonies.
- Opposition to taxation without representation in response to the tea tax imposed on the colonies by the British Parliament. Comparison of taxation without representation to the state of slavery.
- Regarding the cruel treatment of the Colony of Massachusetts Bay as the intent to deprive colonies of their rights and liberties.
- Proclamation of the cause of the Town of Boston as the common cause of the colonies and calling " firmly to unite in an indissoluble Union and Association" to oppose the infringement upon the rights and privileges in the colonies.
- A call not to import British goods into the colonies and banish luxury and extravagance as well as encourage local manufacturing by subscription.
- Objection to African slave trade on the grounds that it prevents manufacturers and other useful immigrants from settling in the colonies.
- Encouragement of raising sheep, hemp, and flax.
- Assertion that wearing clothes manufactured in the colonies is a sign of true patriotism.
- Appointment of Samuel Young, Moses Winslow, and William Kennon to represent Rowan County at the First Provincial Congress in anticipation of the First Continental Congress in Philadelphia.
- Recommendation not to trade with any colony that will refuse to join the Union to preserve rights and liberties in the colonies as will be agreed upon in the future Continental Progress in Philadelphia.

== Signatories ==
Freeholder representatives from all parts of Rowan County signed the Resolves.

- James McCay
- Andrew Neal
- George Cathy
- Alexander Dobbins
- Francis McKorkle
- Matthew Locke
- Maxwell Chambers
- Henry Harmon
- Abraham Dinton
- William Davidson
- Samuel Young
- John Brevard
- William Kennon, Esq., Chairman
- George Henry Barringer
- Robert Bell
- John Bickerstaff
- John Cowdon
- John Lewis Beard
- John Nisbet
- Charles McDowel
- Robert Blackburn
- Christopher Beekman
- William Sharpe
- John Johnson
- Morgan Bryan
- Adlai Osborne, Esq., Clerk

== Commemoration ==
On August 9, 2009 Rowan Public Library held the first annual Rowan Resolves Day to commemorate Rowan County's involvement in paving the road to American Independence.
