= Francis Locke =

Francis Locke may refer to:

- Francis Locke Sr. (1722–1796), Revolutionary War Colonel and victor at the Battle of Ramseur's Mill
- Francis Locke Jr. (1776–1823), politician from North Carolina; son of Francis Lock, Sr.
