= Hugh Montgomery (soldier) =

Colonial American

Colonel Hugh Montgomery, Sr.
- Born: Hugh Montgomery; 1720; Éire (Ireland)
- Died: December 23, 1779 (aged 58–59); Salisbury, North Carolina
- Burial place: Old English cemetery, Salisbury, North Carolina
- Spouses: Mary Moore; Catherine Sloan
- Military career
- Allegiance: United States
- Branch: North Carolina militia
- Service years: 1776-1777
- Rank: colonel
- Commands: Rowan County Regiment, militia

Hugh Montgomery (1720 – December 23, 1779) was a member of Rowan County Committee of Safety in 1775, and, in spite of his age, briefly commander of the Rowan County Regiment during the American Revolutionary War.

== Origin and career ==
Hugh Montgomery was born in 1720 in Ireland to James Montgomery, Sr and Ann (nee Thompson) Montgomery. Montgomery carried on a love affair with Catherine Mary Moore, secretly due to her being a woman of noble birth and he less so. There is some evidence that they eloped and were married on board a ship bound for the American colonies in 1749. They lived for a time in the Pennsylvania Colony. He was a "near relative of British General Richard Montgomery, who fell at the Battle of Quebec, in 1775..."

By the 1770s Montgomery resided in Rowan County, North Carolina. He married his second wife, Catherine Sloan, in 1771. In 1775, he was a member of the Rowan County Committee of Safety and the 3rd North Carolina Provincial Congress in 1775. He was commissioned as a colonel on November 23, 1776, in the 1st Rowan County Regiment. In spite of his age, Montgomery replaced Colonel Francis Locke Sr., who had taken command of the newly established 2nd Rowan County Regiment. Colonel Montgomery served as commander until 1777, when Locke once again took command of the unit.

Montgomery died on December 23, 1779 in Salibury, Rowan County, North Carolina, where he is buried in the Old English Cemetery.
