= Battle of Colson's Mill =

1780 military engagement of the American Revolution

Coordinates: 35°9′15.74″N 80°5′5.73″W

- Part of the American Revolutionary War
Date	July 21, 1780
Location	Stanly County, near present-day Norwood, North Carolina
Result	Patriot victory

Belligerents
(United States) Patriot militia	(Kingdom of Great Britain) Loyalist militia

Commanders and leaders
(United States) William Lee Davidson	(Kingdom of Great Britain) Samuel Bryan

Strength
250 militia	400 militia

Casualties and losses
2 wounded	3 killed 4–5 wounded 10 captured

The Battle of Colson's Mill was a battle of the American Revolutionary War that took place in North Carolina on July 21, 1780. A Patriot militia under William Lee Davidson scattered a gathering of Loyalists at Colson's Mill, near the junction of the Rocky and Pee Dee Rivers in present-day Stanly County, North Carolina.

== Background ==
Following the British defeat at Ramsour's Mill, where he arrived with over 1,200 men after the battle on June 20, 1780, General Griffith Rutherford of the Salisbury District Brigade set about chasing down refugees from the battle that were trying to regroup with British troops elsewhere. While he met with some success, expiring enlistments and furloughs rapidly reduced his army's size to about 200. On June 22, he learned that a group of several hundred Loyalists had been recruited by Colonel Samuel Bryan about 75 miles (121 km) to the northeast, near the Yadkin River. Rutherford set off in pursuit, putting out a call for men. By the time he was within 15 miles (24 km) of Bryan's position his force had grown back to 600 men.

Bryan anticipated Rutherford's approach, and began to withdraw down the east side of the Yadkin River with the goal of joining with British regulars on the Pee Dee River. Rutherford gave chase, but his attempts to cut Bryan's retreat off failed. At Salisbury he detached Colonel William Lee Davidson and a picked force to ride down the west side of the Yadkin in case Bryan tried to cross over. However, this design was frustrated when Bryan, marching day and night, reached the British force.

Two days into the chase, Davidson learned that several hundred Loyalists had gathered near Colson's Mill, not far from the junction of the Rocky and Pee Dee Rivers.

Moving rapidly in order to gain the element of surprise, Davidson and his force attempted to surround the farm on which the Loyalists were gathering. However, his front was discovered shortly before the flanking men were in place, and fire commenced. Davidson, the only man in uniform, was targeted by Loyalist marksmen, and was severely injured by a bullet to the gut. However, his men did not falter when he went down, when Col. Francis Locke took command and they dispersed the Loyalist troop, killing three, wounding several more, and taking ten prisoners. The escape of the Loyalists was helped by their familiarity with the local terrain.

== Battle ==
One other of Davidson's men was also wounded in the action. Davidson spent two months recovering from his wounds, and continued to serve afterward. He was eventually killed in the Battle of Cowan's Ford in February 1781. The victory at Colson's Mill, in combination with the victory at Ramsour's Mill the previous month, seriously dampened active Tory support for the British as they moved further into the Carolinas; and Lord Cornwallis possibly lost 3,000 auxiliary Tory troops at a key moment in the Southern Campaign.

== See also ==
- List of American Revolutionary War battles
