= Locke Township =

Locke Township may refer to:

- Locke Township, Crawford County, Arkansas, in Crawford County, Arkansas
- Locke Township, Elkhart County, Indiana
- Locke Township, Ingham County, Michigan
- Locke Township, Rowan County, North Carolina
