= Unity Township =

Unity Township may refer to the following townships in the United States:

- Unity Township, Piatt County, Illinois
- Unity Township, Rowan County, North Carolina
- Unity Township, Columbiana County, Ohio
- Unity Township, Pennsylvania
