= James Brandon (colonel) =

American pioneer and colonial military officer

- Born: 1734
- Died: 1790 (aged 55–56); Rowan County, North Carolina
- Burial place: Thyatira Presbyterian Church Cemetery, Millbridge, North Carolina
- Military career
- Allegiance: United States of America
- Branch: North Carolina militia
- Service years: 1775-1783
- Rank: Colonel
- Unit: Rowan County Regiment
- Commands: 2nd Rowan County Regiment

James Brandon (1734–1790) was an early pioneer in Rowan County, North Carolina and an officer in the North Carolina militia during the American Revolution. He commanded the 2nd Rowan County Regiment from 1782 to 1783.

== Life story ==
James Brandon was born in 1734, the son of John Brandon Jr. and Maley Cathey. In 1754, he married Elizabeth Armstrong in Rowan County, North Carolina. He obtained Granville land grants on the north side of Fourth Creek in Rowan County in 1760 and 1764 and was a slave owner. According to his will he had the following children: William Brandon, Benjamin Brandon, John Brandon, Jane (Brandon) Wilson, Abel Brandon, Armstrong Brandon, He served on the Rowan County Committee of Safety, before the Revolutionary War. He died after the war in 1790 in Rowan County and was buried at the Thyatira Presbyterian Church Cemetery.

== Military service ==
James served as an officer in the North Carolina militia during the American Revolution:

- 2nd Major in the Rowan County Regiment of the North Carolina militia -(1775)
- Major in the 1st Rowan County Regiment of the North Carolina militia (1775–1777)
- Major in the Rowan County Regiment of the North Carolina militia (1777–1780)
- Lt. Colonel in the Rowan County Regiment of North Carolina militia (1780–1782)
- Colonel over the 2nd Rowan County Regiment of the North Carolina militia (1782–1783)

The North Carolina General Assembly split the Rowan County Regiment into two regiments on October 22, 1775—the 1st Rowan County Regiment and the 2nd Rowan County Regiment. On May 9, 1777, when the Burke County Regiment was created, the 1st Rowan County Regiment reverted to the Rowan County Regiment. On May 1, 1782, the Rowan County Regiment was split into the 1st and 2nd Rowan County regiments and Colonel Brandon was given command of the 2nd Rowan County Regiment.

Known engagements:

- 1776, Cherokee Expedition
- April 14, 1780, Battle of Monck's Corners
- Spring of 1780, Siege of Charleston
