= Rowan County Regiment =

- Active: 1775–1783
- Disbanded: September 3, 1783
- Allegiance: North Carolina
- Branch: North Carolina militia
- Type: Militia
- Part of: Salisbury District Brigade
- Garrison/HQ: Salisbury, North Carolina

Commanders
- Notable commanders: 1. Colonel Griffith Rutherford; 2. Col. Matthew Locke; 3. Col. Francis Locke, Sr.; 4. Colonel Hugh Montgomery

The Rowan County Regiment was originally established in about August 1, 1775 as a local militia in Rowan County in the Province of North Carolina. When the North Carolina Provincial Congress authorized thirty-five existing county militias to be organized on September 9, 1775, the Rowan County Regiment was included and all officers were appointed with commissions from the Provincial Congress. The members of the Rowan County Regiment were mostly from what was Rowan County at the time. Prior to establishment of the Rowan County Regiment, many of its officers were active in the Rowan County Committee of Safety. The regiment included 160 known companies and one or more of these companies were engaged in 36 known battles or skirmishes during the American Revolution. After the establishment of the Rowan County Regiment, several other counties were created from Rowan County, including Burke County in 1777, Iredell County in 1788, Davidson County in 1822 and Davie County in 1836.

== History ==
Prior to the American Revolution, Rowan County had a militia regiment, like all colonial NC counties, as part of the Province of North Carolina. The Rowan County militia was used to defend the settlers during the Anglo-Cherokee War of 1758 to 1761 when the Cherokee Indians were devastating the outlying settlements. When Governor Arthur Dobbs sent a 50-man company of North Carolina Provincial Soldiers to the NC frontier in the summer of 1755, its commander, Captain Hugh Waddell, was placed in overall command of the Rowan and Anson County Regiments.–. When the construction of Fort Dobbs (North Carolina) was ordered by Governor Dobbs, he also ordered the Anson and Rowan County Militia Regiments to each create a 50-man militia company, which could be called on in there was an alarm. Both were to rendezvous at Fort Dobbs to support the Provincials there.

From mid-May to mid-June 1767, Waddell commanded Rowan and Mecklenburg militia detachments accompanying Governor Tryon to establish a boundary between North Carolina and the Cherokee. In 1768, the regiment was commanded by Colonel Alexander Osborne. Colonel Osborne marched with the Rowan County regiment to assist Governor William Tryon in suppressing the Regulator Movement at Hillsborough in 1768 on the Yadkin River above Salisbury. (The Rowan County Scots-Irish did not join the Regulator Movement.) Colonel Osborn (1706–1776) was the father of Adlai Osborne, who would later command the 2nd Rowan County Regiment during the American Revolution.

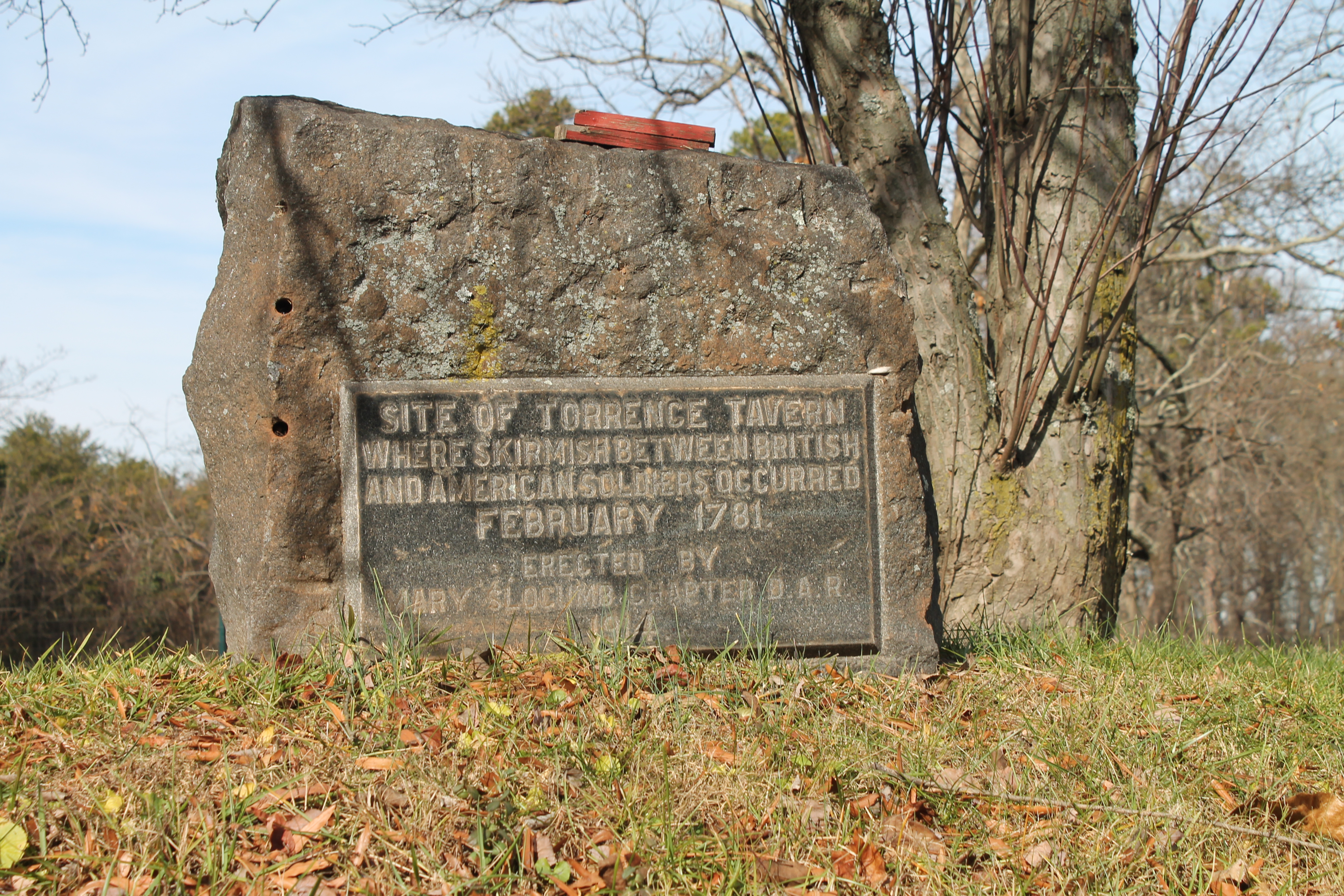
The DAR marker commemorating the Battle of Torrence's Tavern, located on Langtree Road near the intersection with N.C. Highway 115 in Mount Mourne.

As a lead up to the American Revolution, the Rowan County Regiment was established on about August 1, 1775 under patriot command. Most of the regimental leadership were participants in the Rowan County Committee of Safety. The North Carolina Provincial Congress authorized the Rowan County Regiment to be organized as one of the 35 existing county militias on September 9, 1775. Colonel Griffith Rutherford became its first commander. Shortly after being authorized, the regiment was split on October 22, 1775, into two separate and distinct regiments—the 1st Rowan County Regiment and the 2nd Rowan County Regiment. The 1st Rowan County Regiment retained most of the original members of the original Rowan County Regiment. When the Salisbury District Brigade was created on May 4, 1776, the Rowan County Regiment was included in this brigade and Col Rutherford assumed command of the brigade. On May 9, 1777, the 2nd Rowan County Regiment was renamed as the Burke County Regiment, and the 1st Rowan County Regiment reverted to its original name—the Rowan County Regiment. On May 1, 1782, this regiment was once again split into two separate and distinct regiments—the 1st Rowan County Regiment and the 2nd Rowan County Regiment. These two separate regiments continued until the end of the war (September 3, 1783).

== Officers ==
The following listings show the known commanders, officers, staff, and soldiers of the Rowan County Regiment. Col Rutherford left the Rowan County Regiment when he was promoted to brigadier general in charge of the 1st Salisbury District Minutemen and later the Salisbury District Brigade.

Commandants and colonels:

- Colonel Alexander Osborne (commander prior to 1775)
- Colonel Griffith Rutherford (commandant, original officer) (Sep 9, 1775 to Dec 21, 1775)
- Colonel Matthew Locke (1775–1783, 2nd colonel, brother of Francis Locke)
- Colonel Francis Locke, Sr. (original officer) (commandant, December 21, 1775–November 13, 1776; April 10, 1777–1783)
- Colonel Hugh Montgomery (commandant, November 23, 1776–April 10, 1777)

| Known lieutenant colonels: | Known majors: | Known adjutants: |
|---|---|---|
| Lt. Col. Francis Locke; Lt. Col. James Brandon; Lt. Col. Matthew Brandon; Lt. Col. Andrew Caldwell; Lt. Col. David Caldwell; Lt. Col. Alexander Dobbins; Lt. Col. Thomas Frohock; Lt. Col. John Hampton; Lt. Col. Ezekiel Polk; Lt. Col. William Porter | 1st Maj. John Dobbins (original officer); 2nd Maj. James Brandon (original officer); Maj. James Barr; Maj. George Henry Barrier; Maj. Lewis Bayard; Maj. James Brandon; Maj. William Lee Davidson; Maj. William Davis; Maj. Robert Gillespie; Maj. James Hall; Maj. Benjamin Harris; Maj. James Irvin; Maj. John Johnston; Maj. John Lopp; Maj. Madison; Maj. Martin; Maj. Thomas McGuire; Maj. Richmond Pearson; Maj. Ezekiel Polk; Maj. John Rowan; Maj. Philip Rutherford; Maj. Walter Sharp; Maj. James Smith; Maj. William Stewart | William Lee Davidson; George Lowman; Thomas McGuire |
Other staff
| Thomas Gillespie – Commissary; James Kerr – Commissary | David Ramsey – Commissary; John Scott – Commissary; Jacob Utzman – Commissary (also Ensign) | James Hall – Chaplain; William White – Paymaster; Joseph Marbury – Quartermaster General |

The regiment consisted of 160 known companies headed by captains. Company officers included lieutenants, ensigns, sergeants, corporals, and privates/drummers/fifers. The following are the known notable captains and subordinates:

- Lieutenant William Richardson Davie, 10th Governor of North Carolina (1798–1799)
- Captain William Sharpe, delegate to the Continental Congress (1779–1781)
- Captain Joseph Dickson, Congressman from North Carolina (1799–1801)and Tennessee (1807–1811)

== Engagements ==
The Rowan County Regiment was involved in 31 known engagements during the American Revolution from 1775 to 1782. They fought in Georgia, North Carolina, and South Carolina. The battle of Torrence's Tavern was the only battle fought in what became Iredell County, North Carolina in 1788, where many of the regiment's soldiers resided after the war. Companies were headed by captains. Not every company took part in every engagement. The regiment was also responsible for manning a shoe factory near what is now Statesville, North Carolina. The known engagements included:

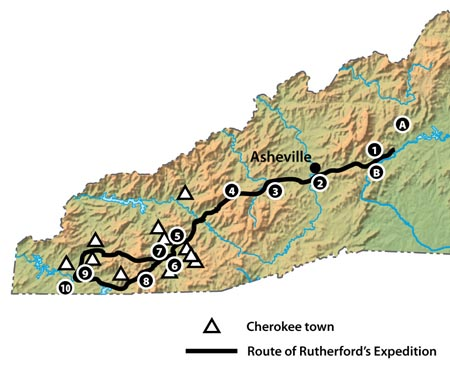
Map of the route taken by the Rowan County Regiment in the Cherokee Expedition, known today as the Rutherford Trace

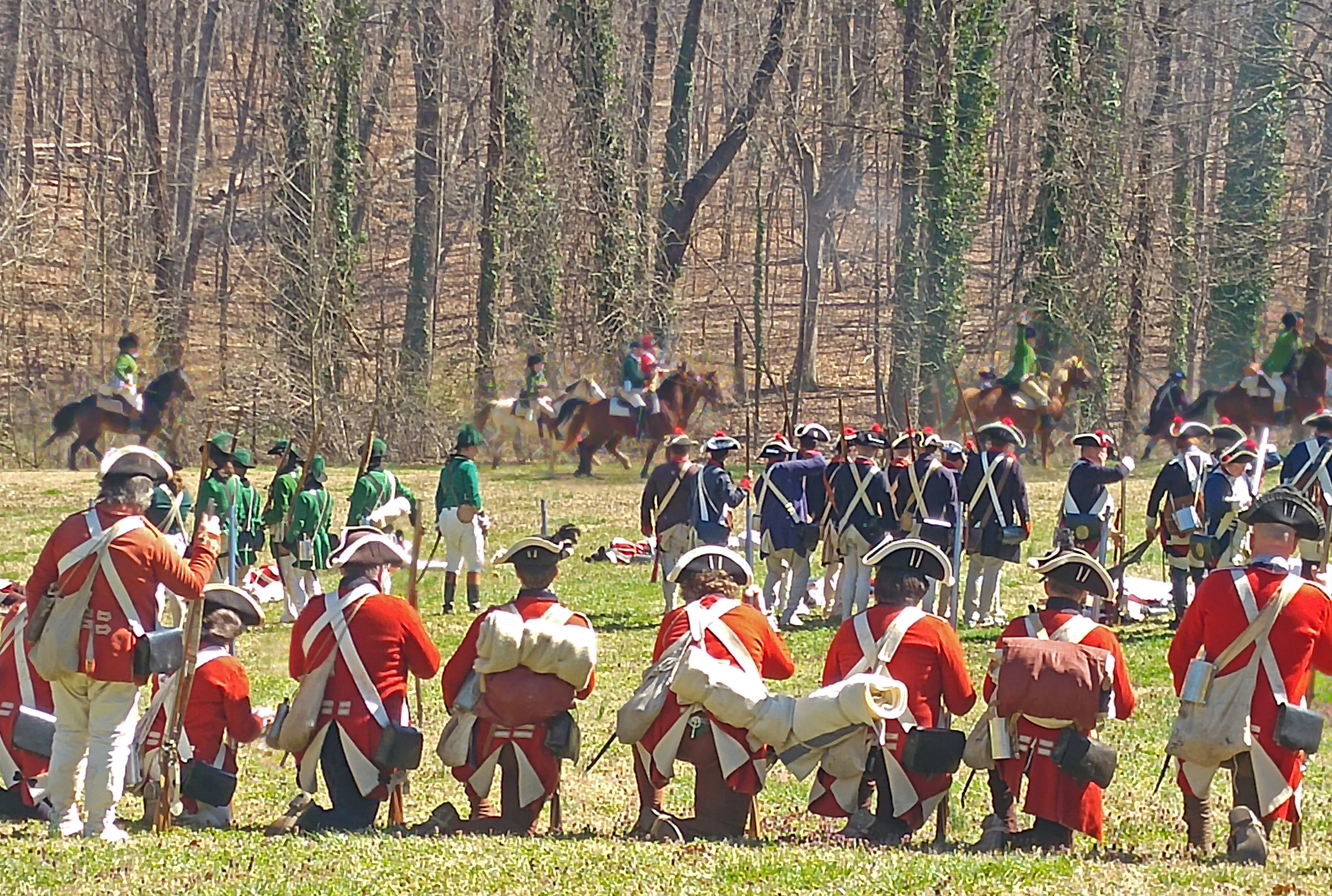
Battle of Guiliford Courthouse 1781 )(reenactment)

| Order | Date range | Battles/Skirmishes | State |
|---|---|---|---|
| 1 | 11/19-11/21/1775 | Siege of Savage's Old Fields 1775 | SC |
| 2 | 12/22/1775 | Battle of Great Cane Brake | SC |
| 3 | 12/23-12/30/1775 | Snow Campaign | SC |
| 4 | 8/1-11/1/1776 | Cherokee Expedition 1776 | NC |
| 5 | 3/3/1779 | Battle of Briar Creek | GA |
| 6 | 6/20/1779 | Battle of Stono Ferry | SC |
| 7 | 3/28-5/12/1780 | Siege of Charleston 1780 | SC |
| 8 | 4/14/1780 | Battle of Monck's Corner #1 | SC |
| 9 | 6/20/1780 | Battle of Ramseur's Mill | NC |
| 10 | 7/15/1780 | Earle's Ford | SC |
| 11 | 7/21/1780 | Battle of Colson's Mill | NC |
| 12 | 8/11/1780 | Little Lynches Creek | SC |
| 13 | 8/16/1780 | Battle of Camden | SC |
| 14 | 8/18/1780 | Battle of Fishing Creek | SC |
| 15 | 9/10/1780 | Mask's Ferry | NC |
| 16 | 10/7/1780 | Battle of King's Mountain | SC |
| 17 | 10/14/1780 | Battle of Shallow Ford | NC |
| 18 | 1/17/1781 | Battle of Cowpens | SC |
| 19 | 2/1/1781 | Battle of Cowan's Ford | NC |
| 20 | 2/1/1781 | Battle of Torrence/Tarrant's Tavern | NC |
| 21 | 2/3-2/4/1781 | Trading Ford | NC |
| 22 | 2/4/1781 | Grant's Creek | NC |
| 23 | 2/17/1781 | Battle of Hart's Mill | NC |
| 24 | 2/25/1781 | Battle of Haw River | NC |
| 25 | 3/6/1781 | Battle of Whetzell's Mill | NC |
| 26 | 3/15/1781 | Battle of Guilford Court House | NC |
| 27 | 4/25/1781 | Battle of Hobkirk's Hill | SC |
| 28 | 5/21-6/19/1781 | Siege of Ninety-Six 1781 | SC |
| 29 | 9/8/1781 | Battle of Eutaw Springs | SC |
| 30 | 9/13/1781 | Battle of Lindley's Mill | NC |
| 31 | 6/1-10/31/1782 | Cherokee Expedition 1782 | NC |

== See also ==
- Cherokee–American wars
- Fort Dobbs
- List of American Revolutionary War battles
- Salisbury District Brigade
- Southern Campaigns: Pension Transactions for a description of the transcription effort by Will Graves
- Southern theater of the American Revolutionary War
