= William Sharpe (North Carolina politician) =

American politician

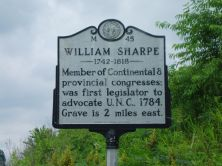
- North Carolina State Highway Marker M-45, William Sharpe 1742-1818
- Born: William Sharpe; December 13, 1742; Rock Church, Cecil County, Maryland
- Died: July 1, 1818; Statesville, North Carolina, US
- Resting place: Snow Creek Methodist Church Cemetery, Statesville, North Carolina
- Occupations: politician, lawyer
- Known for: Creator of the 1773 map of the Fourth Creek Congregation, patriotic service in the American Revolution, member of the Continental Congress, representative to the North Carolina legislature
- Spouse: Catherine Ruth (Reese) Sharpe (1744-1826)
- Children: 12
- Parents: Thomas Sharpe, Jr. (father); Elizabeth (Gillespie) Sharpe (mother)
- Military career
- Allegiance: United States of America
- Branch: North Carolina militia
- Service years: 1776-1781
- Rank: Colonel
- Units: Salisbury District Brigade
- Commands: 2nd Rowan County Regiment (1776-1777), Burke County Regiment (1777-1781)
- Conflicts: Cherokee Expedition 1776

William Sharpe (December 13, 1742 – July 1, 1818) was a lawyer, politician, American Revolution patriot, and a delegate to the Continental Congress from Rowan County, North Carolina, which became Iredell County in 1788.

== Early life ==
Sharpe was born in Rock Church, Cecil County, Maryland, in 1742. He was the son of Thomas Sharp, Jr, and his wife, Elizabeth, of Maryland. He pursued classical studies and law. He was admitted to the bar and commenced practice in Mecklenburg County, North Carolina in 1763. He married Catherine Reese in Mecklenburg County, North Carolina on May 31, 1768. He moved to Rowan County, North Carolina in late 1768 or 1769. He lived in the area of Rowan County that became Iredell County in 1788.

== Career ==
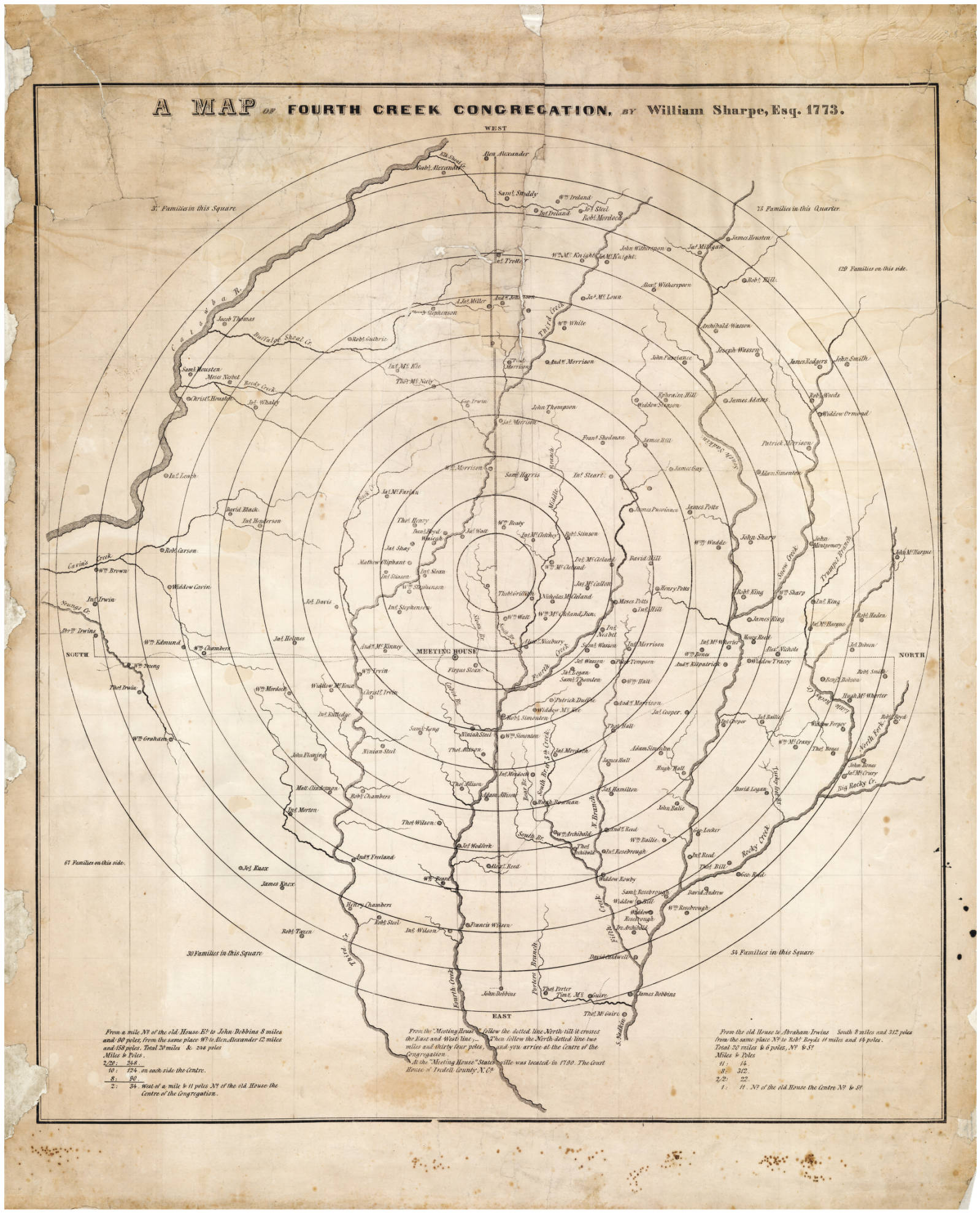
Map of the Fourth Creek Congregation created by William Sharpe in 1773

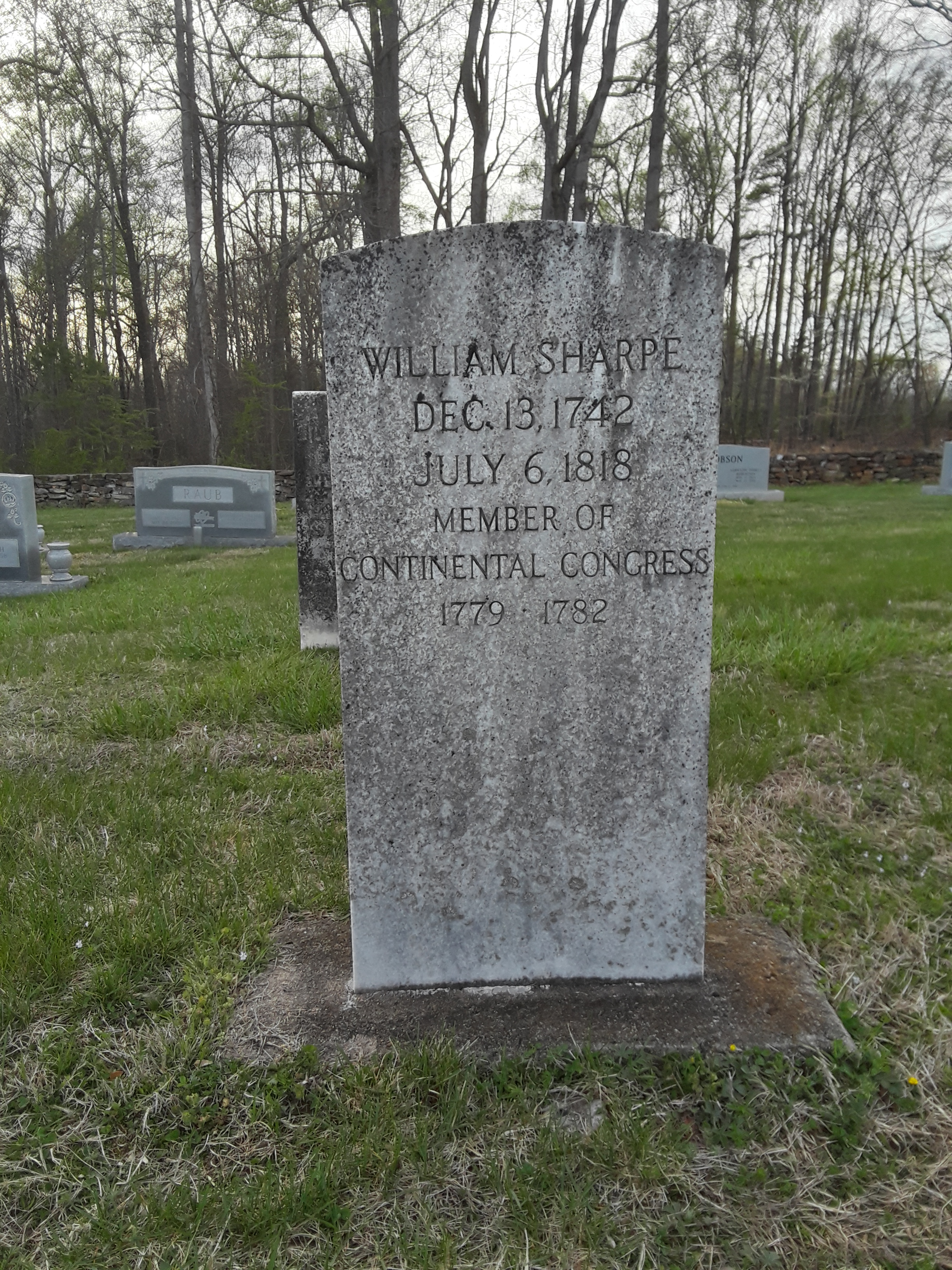
Sharpe's grave at Snow Creek Methodist Church near Statesville, North Carolina

William Sharpe was a member of the Fourth Creek Congregation in Rowan County, North Carolina (near what became Statesville, North Carolina in 1789) and created a map of the church members in 1773.

Sharpe was a member of the North Carolina Provincial Congress in 1775. Prior to the onset of the American Revolutionary War, he served on the Rowan County Committee of Safety.

During the war, he was an aide to General Griffith Rutherford of the Salisbury District Brigade in the Indian campaign in 1776. William was one of four commissioners appointed by Governor Caswell to form a treaty with the Indians in 1777. William served as Colonel commanding the 2nd Rowan County Regiment of the North Carolina militia from 1776-1777. When the 2nd Rowan County Regiment became the Burke County Regiment of militia, he served as its commander from 1777 to 1781. (Note there was another Captain William Sharpe, who served in the Rowan County Regiment from 1780 to 1781. The relation to Colonel William Sharpe is not known.)

Sharpe served as a delegate to the North Carolina constitutional convention in Halifax in 1776, and helped to frame the first constitution of the State. He was later appointed in 1779 as a delegate to the Continental Congress, 1779–1781, and elected to the North Carolina House of Representatives in 1781 and 1782.

Sharpe placed the first bill before the legislature of North Carolina to propose a publicly supported university in the state. This bill failed, but was taken up at the next seating of the legislature and was promoted by one of the state's Revolutionary War leaders General William Richardson Davie. It subsequently passed in 1789, creating the University of North Carolina.

He died near Statesville, North Carolina on July 6, 1818 and is interred in Snow Creek Burying Ground.
