= 2nd Rowan County Regiment =

Local militia in Rowan County, North Carolina Colony

- Active: 1775-1777, 1777-1782 (Burke County Regiment), 1782-1783
- Allegiance: North Carolina
- Branch: North Carolina militia
- Type: Militia
- Part of: Salisbury District Brigade

Commanders
- Notable commanders: Colonel Adlai Osborne; Colonel James Brandon; Colonel Joseph McDowell; Colonel Charles McDowell

The 2nd Rowan County Regiment was first established on October 22, 1775, as a local militia in Rowan County in the Province of North-Carolina. This regiment was created from the existing Rowan County Regiment of militia. Its original officers were Col Adlai Osborne, Lt Col Christopher Beekman, and Major Charles McDowell. Adlai Osborne was a leader in Rowan County and member of the Rowan County Committee of Safety. On May 9, 1777, the regiment was renamed the Burke County Regiment, which was active until the end of the Revolutionary War in 1783.

== History ==
=== First Instance of 2nd Rowan County Regiment ===
The 2nd Rowan County Regiment was initially established on October 22, 1775, as an off-shoot of the Rowan County Regiment when the 1st and 2nd Rowan County Regiments were established. Most of the original officers of the Rowan County Regiment were assigned to the 1st Rowan County Regiment. The 2nd Rowan County Regiment's initial assignment was to march to the coast of North Carolina to support the Battle of Moore's Creek Bridge. The regiment marched to Cross Creek and found out that they were too late for the battle, so they turned around and headed home. The Regiment saw action only at McDowell's Station and the Cherokee Expedition in 1776. McDowell's station was located at Quaker Meadows along the upper Catawba River in western Rowan County, near present-day Morganton. Ten men from the regiment, under command of Lieutenant Colonel Charles McDowell, defended 120 local settlers from attack by the Cherokee. This was a prelude to the Cherokee Expedition that involved additional troops from both the 1st and 2nd Rowan County regiments.

Known senior officers are listed below for the 2nd Rowan County Regiment (October 22, 1775 – May 9, 1777):

- Col. Adlai Osborne
- Col. Christopher Beekman
- Col. William Sharpe
- Maj. (also Lt Col.) Charles McDowell
- John Davidson, Pack Horse Master (1776)
- James Greenlee - Wagon Master (1776)

=== Burke County Regiment instance ===
On May 9, 1777, the regiment was renamed the Burke County Regiment, which was active until the end of the Revolutionary War in 1783. In 1777, Burke County was formed from Rowan County. It was named for Thomas Burke, then serving as a delegate to the Continental Congress (1777 to 1781).

As Burke County Regiment (May 9, 1777 – May 1, 1782) the senior officers were:

- Lt. Col. William Armstrong
- Lt. Col. Christopher Beekman
- Lt. Col. James Brittain
- Lt. Col. Charles McDowell
- 1st Maj. Hugh Brevard
- 2nd Maj. George Wilfong (also adjutant in 1775)
- Maj. Joseph McDowell

=== Second instance of the 2nd Rowan County Regiment ===
On May 1, 1782, the Rowan County Regiment had grown very large and again was split into two parts—a 1st Rowan County Regiment and a 2nd Rowan County Regiment. The 2nd Rowan County Regiment was led by Captains David Caldwell, Thomas Cowan, David Crawford, George Davidson, John Graham, Jacob Nichols, and James Purviance. The only action that this instance of the unit saw was in the Cherokee Expedition in 1782.

Senior officers of the reconstituted 2nd Rowan County Regiment (May 1, 1782-end of war) include:

- Colonel James Brandon
- Lt. Col. David Caldwell
- Maj. John Lopp
- Maj. Jacob Nichols

== Known company captains ==
Known captains are listed below:

- James Armstrong
- Waightstill Avery
- James Barr
- Christopher Beekman
- William Beekman
- Unknown Cain
- Jonathan Kemp (Camp)
- John Connelly
- Thomas Cowan
- David Crawford
- George Davidson
- Samuel Davidson
- William Davidson
- William Lee Davidson
- Jacob Eckles
- Archibald Fleming
- John Graham
- James Gray
- John Harden
- Henry Highland
- Robert Holmes
- Thomas Kennedy
- Thomas Lytle
- Francis McCorkle
- John McDowell
- Joseph McDowell
- William Moon
- William Moore
- James Morrison
- Reuben Morrison
- William Morrison
- Peter Mull
- William Neill
- William Penland
- James Purviance
- David Robinson
- James Roddy
- Conrad Rudolph
- John Russell
- Leroy Taylor
- Lewis Taylor
- Joseph White
- Reuben White
- Thomas Whitson
- Samuel Woods

== Bibliography ==
- List of Taxables in Rowan County, North Carolina, 1778, Link, mentions several of the Captains of the 2nd Rowan County Regiment, after it was re-established
- Bibliography of the Continental Army in North Carolina compiled by the United States Army Center of Military History
- Crow, Jeffrey J. (1975). A Chronicle of North Carolina During the American Revolution, 1763–1789. Raleigh: North Carolina Department of Cultural Resources, Division of Archives and History.
- North Carolina Department of Archives and History, North Carolina Revolutionary Army Accounts-Secretary of State Treasurer's and Comptroller's Papers Journal "A" (Public Accounts) 1775-1776.
- Powell, William Stevens (1996). Dictionary of North Carolina Biography. Chapel Hill: University of North Carolina Press.
  - Volume 1, A-C
  - Volume 2, D-G
  - Volume 3, H-K
  - Volume 4, L-O
  - Volume 5, P-S
  - Volume 6, T-Z,
- Rumple, Jethro Rev (1881). A History of Rowan County.
- Russell, Phillips (1965). North Carolina in the Revolutionary War. Charlotte: Heritage Printers.
- Saunders, William, ed. (1890). The Colonial Records of North Carolina, vol. 10. Raleigh: Josephus Daniels.
- Wheeler, Earl M. (July 1964). Development and Organization of the North Carolina Militia. Vol. 41. North Carolina Historical Review. pp. 307–323.
- Keever, Homer Maxwell (November 1976). Iredell Piedmont County, with illustrations by Louise Gilbert and maps by Mildred Jenkins Miller. Iredell County Bicentennial Commission by Brady Printing Company from type set by the Statesville Record and Landmark.
