= Battle of McDowell's Station =

1781 battle of the American Revolutionary War

- Part of the American Revolutionary War
Date	July 3 - 12, 1776
Location	Near present-day Morganton, North Carolina
Result	Patriot victory

Belligerents
Cherokee (Kingdom of Great Britain) Loyalist militia	Patriot militia

Commanders and leaders
Unknown Cherokee leader (Kingdom of Great Britain) Carlton Witty	Charles McDowell; Matthias Barringer †; Griffith Rutherford

Strength
Unknown	Initially 10, later reinforced by 2,400

Casualties and losses
Unknown	Unknown

The battle of McDowell's Station occurred from July 3—12, 1776 between Patriot forces and the Cherokee near present-day Morganton, North Carolina. Tensions between European settlers and Cherokee warriors of towns that the pioneers encroached on had increased during the 1750s, culminating in open hostilities. During the incursions into European settlements, the Indians attacked and laid siege to the fort after killing 37 settlers along the Catawba River. Many fled to the fortification set up by the Patriots for protection from the Cherokee. Lt. Col. Charles McDowell had 10 men to protect 120 women and children when the Cherokee attack began. Brig. Gen. Griffith Rutherford mounted an expedition force of 2,400 to relieve the defenders of McDowell's Station. The settlers were able to hold out against the Cherokee. As the relief force arrived, the Cherokee stopped the siege and withdrew.
