= Rowan County Committee of Safety =

The Rowan County Committee of Safety was one of the 18 Committees of Safety in North Carolina authorized by the Continental Congress and endorsed by the Second North Carolina Provincial Congress. It was established in Rowan County, North Carolina in 1774. Meeting minutes from 1774 to 1776 have survived and are available through a digital collection. The Rowan County Committee of Safety was instrumental in banning trade with Britain and preparing for the American Revolution. One of its major achievements was the Rowan Resolves.

== Formation of Committees of Safety ==
The demand for independence came from local grassroots organizations called "Committees of Safety". The First Continental Congress had urged their creation in 1774. By 1775, they had become counter-governments that gradually replaced royal authority and took control of local governments. They regulated the economy, politics, morality, and militia of their individual communities. After December 1776 they came under the control of a more powerful central authority, the North Carolina Council of Safety.

== Members and records ==
The following persons constituted the original Committee: James McCay, Andrew Neal, George Cathy, Alexander Dobbin, Francis McKon, Matthew Locke, Maxwell Chambers, Henry Harmon, Abraham Denton, William Lee Davidson, Samuel Young, John Brevard, William Kennon, George Henry Barger, Robert Bell, John Bickerstaff, John Couden, John Lewis Beard, John Nisbet, Charles McDowell, Robert Blackburn, Christopher Beckman, William Sharp, John Johnson, Morgan Bryan.

Additional members included: Colonel Hugh Montgomery.

The surviving records show that the committee met on the following dates:

- September 23, 1774
- November 2, 1774 - November 3, 1774
- June 1, 1775
- July 8, 1775
- July 15, 1775
- August 1, 1775
- September 20, 1775 - September 25, 1775
- October 17, 1775 - October 18, 1775
- November 7, 1775 - November 9, 1775
- November 10, 1775 - November 11, 1775
- February 6, 1776 - February 8, 1776
- May 7, 1776 - May 8, 1776
- August 7, 1776
- August 22, 1776

Other surviving records include:

- Instructions to the Salisbury Jail keeper concerning the imprisonment of John Auston (July 13, 1776)
- Address from the Rowan County Committee of Safety to the county militias (June 1775)

The instructions to the Salisbury jail keeper were from Griffith Rutherford and instructed the jailer: "John Auston, late of Tryon County, is charged of being an Enemy To Ammerican Liberty, & also Refuses to take the oath Proscribed by the Counsel of Safety of this Provance. These are therefore to Command You to Take the said Auston Into youre Possession, & him safely keep in youre Gole Till Furder Orders (sic)." Griffith Rutherford was commander of the Rowan County Regiment and Salisbury District Brigade of the North Carolina Militia.

Officers of the committee included:

- Chairman, William Kennon
- Chairman, Samuel Young
- Chairman, Moses Winslow
- Secretary, William Sharpe
- Clerk, Adlai Osborne
- Clerk, James Macay
- Clerk, James Brandon

The Committees of Safety were authorized by the North Carolina Provincial Congress to appoint officers of the militia and minutemen when officers needed replacing.

== First census ==
In 1775, the Continental Congress ordered that a census of North Carolina be taken. However, the only surviving complete records are those from Pitt County. The Rowan County Committee of Safety reported a summary of the census of Rowan County that was presented in their October 1775 minutes. The Companies referred to in this census were most likely captains in the Rowan County Regiment of the North Carolina militia, which had just been established in August 1775.

Pursuant to Resolve of last Congress the Number of Souls in Rowan County appears as followeth—(sic, directly from minutes)

Companies—Names	Males, 16 to 50	Above 50, Under 16	Women, White	Females, Children	Male Slaves Taxable	Female Slaves Taxable	Slaves Not Taxable
Capt. Knox	165	209	169	142	33	32	66
Capt. Dickson	76	105	77	91	15	16	29
Capt. Davidson (up River)	71	129	74	104	12	9	5
Capt. McConrys	5	123	77	99	10	10	9
Snow & Rocky Creeks	27	47	34	33	1	1	2
Total (2107)	344	613	431	469	71	68	111

== Committees in other counties ==
There were 32 counties in North Carolina by 1774. Eighteen of the counties had Committees of Safety, according to NCPedia. There are records of Committees of Safety in the following counties:

1. Anson County
2. Bladen County
3. Brunswick County
4. Chowan County, Edenton District
5. Craven County (New Bern District)
6. Duplin County
7. Granville County
8. Halifax County
9. Johnston County
10. Mecklenburg County
11. Northampton
12. Orange County
13. Pitt County (Martinboro)
14. Rowan County (Salisbury District)
15. Surry County
16. Tryon County
17. Wilimington District, Wilmington, Wilmington-New Hannover County
