= Adlai Osborne =

Early American lawyer

- Born: Adlai Osborne; June 4, 1744; Province of New Jersey
- Died: December 14, 1814 (aged 70); Mount Mourne, North Carolina, US
- Resting place: Centre Presbyterian Church Cemetery, Mooresville, North Carolina
- Education: Princeton University
- Occupations: soldier, lawyer, land speculator
- Known for: patriot in American Revolutionary War, Clerk of Court, Belmont Plantation, Rowan County Committee of Safety
- Title: Colonel
- Board member of: Trustee, University of North Carolina
- Spouse: Margaret (Lloyd) Osborne
- Children: 11
- Parents: Colonel Alexander Osborne (father); Agnes (McWhorter) Osborne (mother)
- Military Career
- Allegiance: North Carolina
- Branch: Minutemen, Militia
- Service years: 1775–1776
- Rank: Colonel
- Commands: Salisbury District Minutemen, 2nd Rowan County Regiment

Adlai Osborne (June 4, 1744 – December 14, 1814) was a lawyer, public official, plantation owner, and educational leader from Rowan County, North Carolina (became Iredell County in 1788). During the American Revolution, he served on the Rowan County Committee of Safety and commanded the 2nd Rowan County Regiment of the North Carolina militia. He was elected as a delegate to the Continental Congress, but did not serve. In 1789, he was a delegate to the convention in Fayetteville that ratified the United States Constitution.

== Early life ==
Adlai Osborne, the son of Colonel Alexander Osborne (1709-1776) and Agnes (McWhorter) Osborne (1713–1776), was born on June 4, 1744, in the Province of New Jersey. His seven siblings were all female. His sister Rebecca Osborne Ewing is the ancestor of Adlai Stevenson II, who ran for US president in 1952, 1956, and 1960. His parents moved with Adlai and his older sister to the Anson County, Province of North Carolina in 1749 and settled in the area that became Rowan County, North Carolina, in 1753 and later Iredell County, North Carolina, in 1788. He attend Crowfield Academy near his father's home, called Belmont, as well as a private school in Prince Edward County, Virginia. In 1768, he was graduated from Nassau Hall (Princeton University). Adlai married Margaret (Lloyd) Osborne (1754–1830) in Rowan County in 1771. Adlai and Margaret had eleven children. When Alexander Osborne died, Adlai inherited a considerable estate of more than 8,000 acres. Adlai and Margaret lived on their plantation, Belmont, near Mount Mourne in southeast Iredell County.

== Political career ==
After graduating from Princeton, Adlai attended studied law in Rowan County and set up a law office in Salisbury. His home at Belmont was a center of local political and Presbyterian religious activity. Adlai, like his father and father-in-law, supported the anti-Regulator movement in North Carolina that lasted from 1765 to 1771. He was appointed the clerk of the Rowan County Court of Pleas and Quarter Sessions on July 30, 1772. He was appointed to the Rowan County Committee of Safety and served as its clerk in November 1774. As members of the committee, Adlai and William Kennon seized suspect traitors, including John Dunn. He hosted a public magazine at Belmont to support the coming war efforts and four years later was appointed to build a public magazine. Adlai was clerk of the Salisbury District Court of Oyer and terminer (an early criminal court).

Adlai served as commissioner of forfeited estates for Rowan County from 1780 to 1782, inspector of money for the Newington District in 1780, and private secretary of Alexander Martin in 1780. He was nominated to be delegate to the Continental Congress in 1782 but was not elected. He was elected as a delegate to the Continental Congress of November 1784, where he served for one year.

After Iredell County was created in 1788, Adlai was appointed and served as attorney for the state from 1789 to 1796. He was a delegate to the North Carolina Constitutional Convention in Fayette in November 1789. He voted for the ratification of the U.S. Constitution. He served as treasurer of Rowan County from 1795 to 1802.

He was a trustee of the University of North Carolina from its inception in 1789. He was also trustee of Liberty Hall Academy in Charlotte from 1777 to 1780.

== Military service ==
Adlai served with the North Carolina state troops and militia during the first two years of the American Revolution. His military service record included:

- He served as Lieutenant Colonel in the Salisbury District Minutemen (1775): He served under Colonel Thomas Wade. The Minutemen Battalions were authorized by the Third North Carolina Provincial Congress for a duration of six months. They were to replace the local militias. However, the battalion was disbanded on April 10, 1776, in favor of local militias.
- He served as Colonel over the 2nd Rowan County Regiment of the North Carolina militia (1775–1776). The 2nd Rowan County Regiment was initially established on October 22, 1775, as an off-shoot of the Rowan County Regiment when the 1st and 2nd Rowan County Regiments were established. He received his commission on October 22, 1775, and served until sometime prior to April 1776. He did not participate in any engagements with the regiment. Christopher Beekman replaced him as commander. The regiment was renamed the Burke County Regiment on May 9, 1777.

== Later years ==
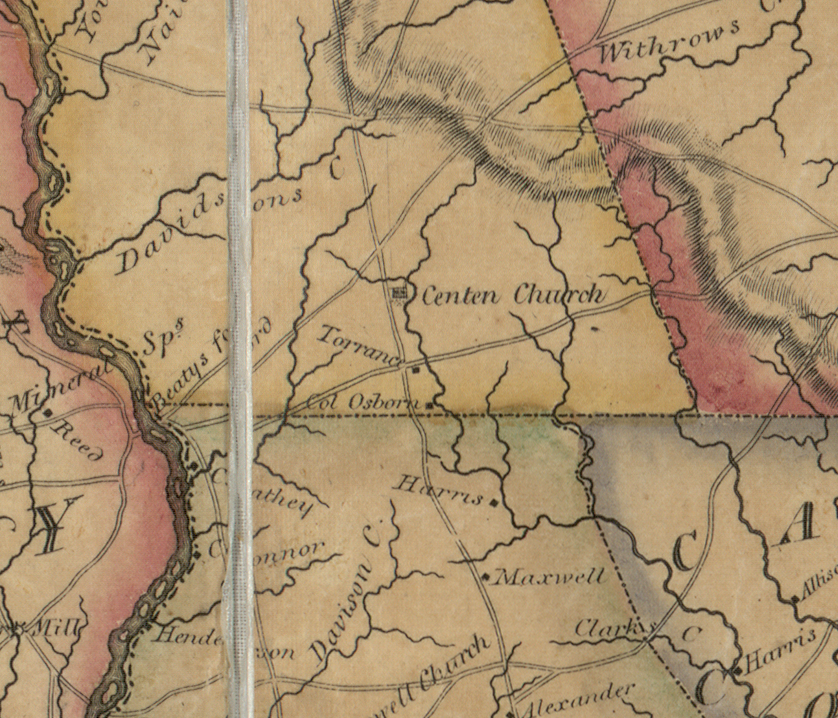
Portion of 1807 map of Iredell and Mecklenburg County showing Col Adlai Osborne's home near the county line

Having resigned his public offices in 1809, he spent his last few years at his plantation, Belmont. Belmont was centrally located and twenty miles from Charlotte, Salisbury, and Statesville. He had a library with over one hundred volumes and a second floor ballroom at Belmont. The plantation was worked by 25 slaves. The plantation was known to raise corn, wheat, oats, barley, cattle, hogs, sheep, flax, and cotton. There was also a dairy and orchard. Adlai died on December 14, 1814, in Mount Mourne. He was buried at the Centre Presbyterian Church cemetery.
