= Unity Township, Rowan County, North Carolina =

Township in Rowan County, North Carolina

Coordinates: 35.7737251°N 80.5771737°W

Unity Township
- Township
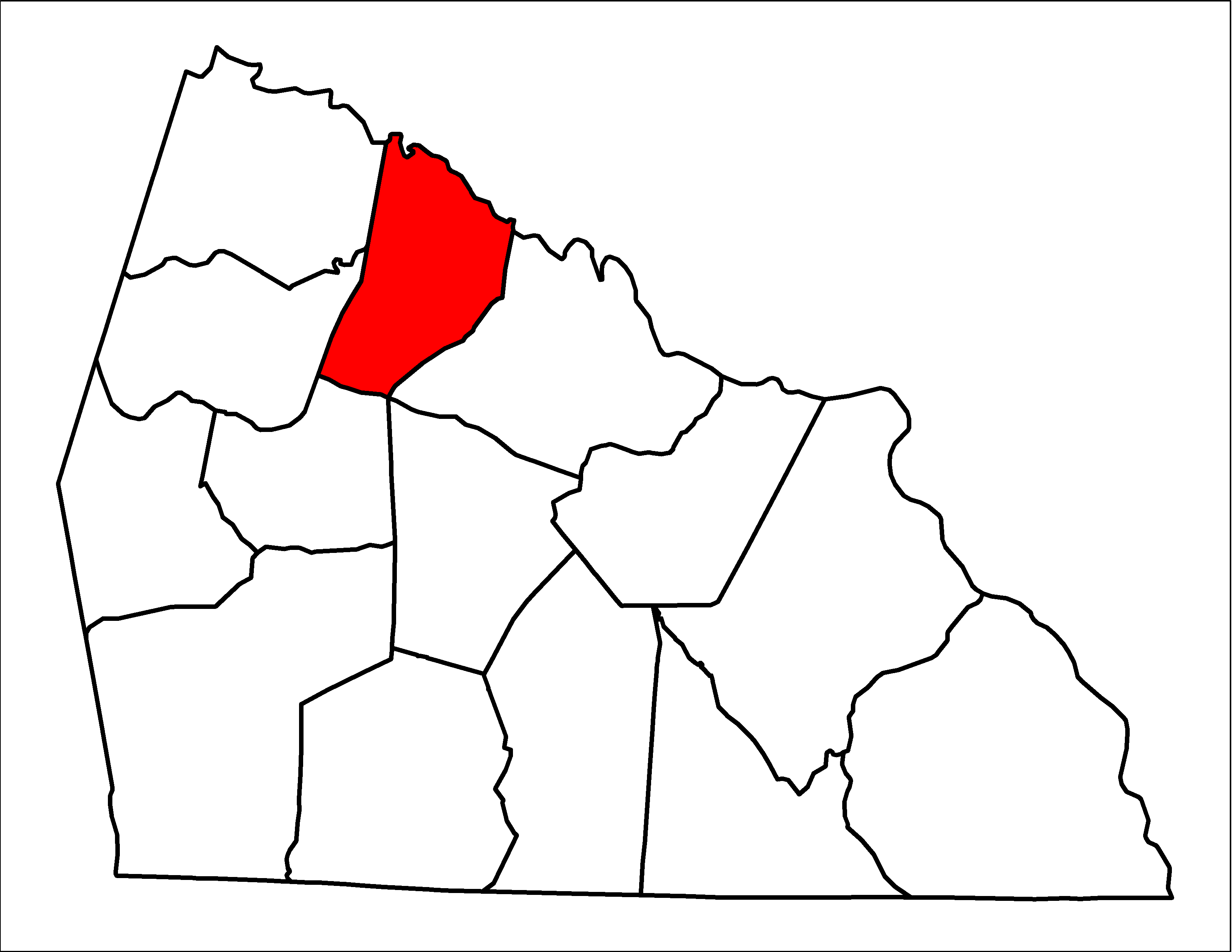
- Location of Unity Township in Rowan County

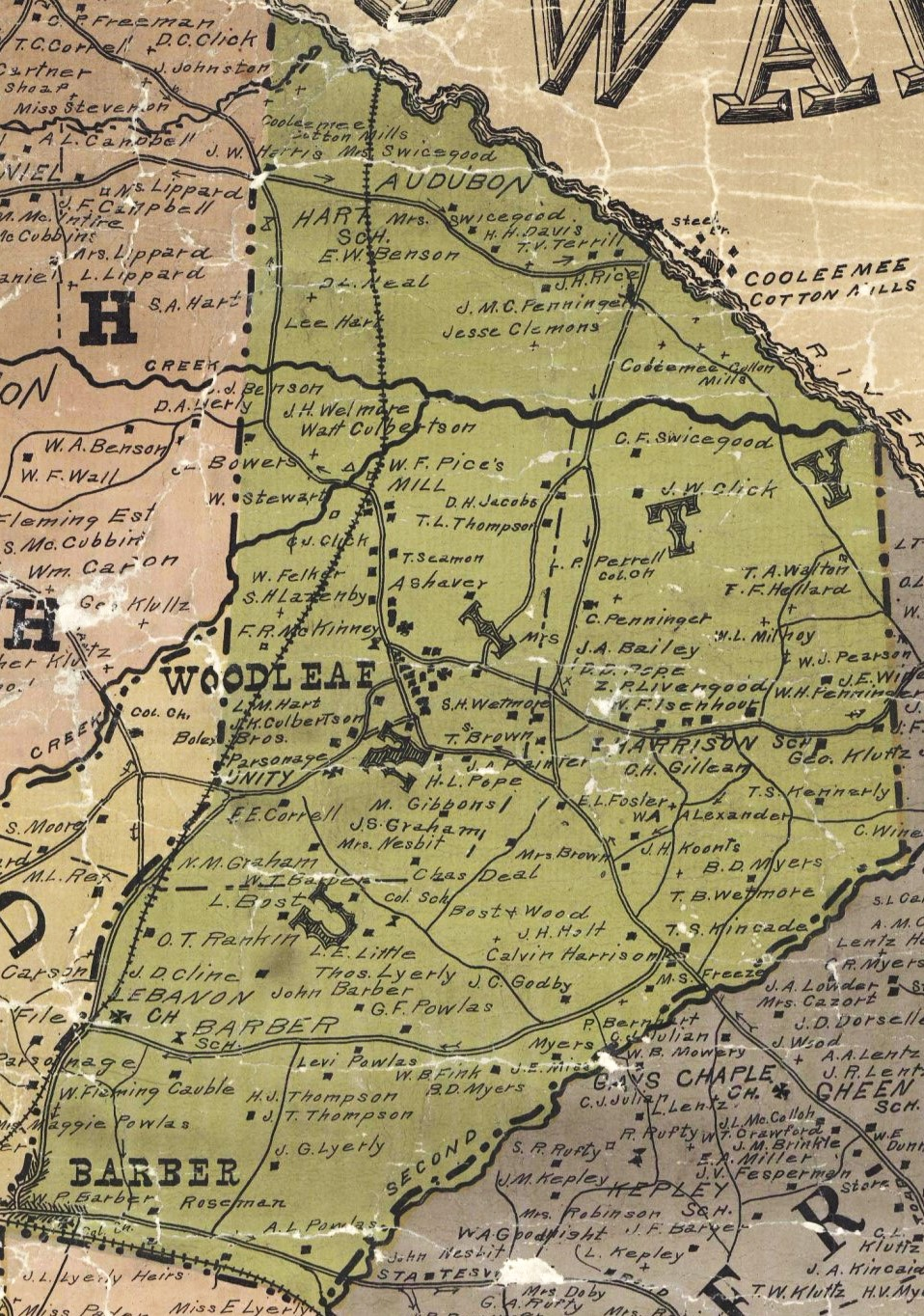
- Unity Township in 1903

- Location within North Carolina Location within the United States
- Country: United States
- State: North Carolina
- County: Rowan
- Established in: 1868

Government
  - Type: non-functioning county subdivision
- Time zone: UTC-5 (Eastern (EST))
  - Summer (DST): UTC-4 (EDT)

Unity Township is one of fourteen townships in Rowan County, North Carolina, United States. The township had a population of 2,215 according to the 2010 census.

Geographically, Unity Township occupies 24.82 square miles (64.3 km^{2}) in northwestern Rowan County. There are no incorporated municipalities in Unity Township. The township's northern boundary is with Davie County.

Residents are served by the Rowan–Salisbury School System.

== History ==
Villages, churches, and schools in Unity Township have included the following:

- Audubon
- Barber School
- Cooleemee Cotton Mills
- Harrison School
- Hart School
- Lebanon Lutheran Church, formed in 1893
- Unity Presbyterian Church, formed in 1788
- Woodleaf or Wood Leaf until 1877, post office established on 4 September 1855 with Daniel Wood as the first postmaster
- Woodleaf Baptist Church, formed in 1978
- Woodleaf Speedway
- Woodlead United Methodist Church

== Adjacent townships ==
- Calahaln Township, Davie County – northwest
- Cleveland – southwest
- Franklin – east
- Jerusalem Township, Davie County – northeast
- Litaker – southeast
- Mocksville Township, Davie County – north
- Scotch Irish – west
- Steele – south
