= Locke Township, Rowan County, North Carolina =

Township in Rowan County, North Carolina, U.S.

Coordinates: 35.6488131°N 80.5219559°W

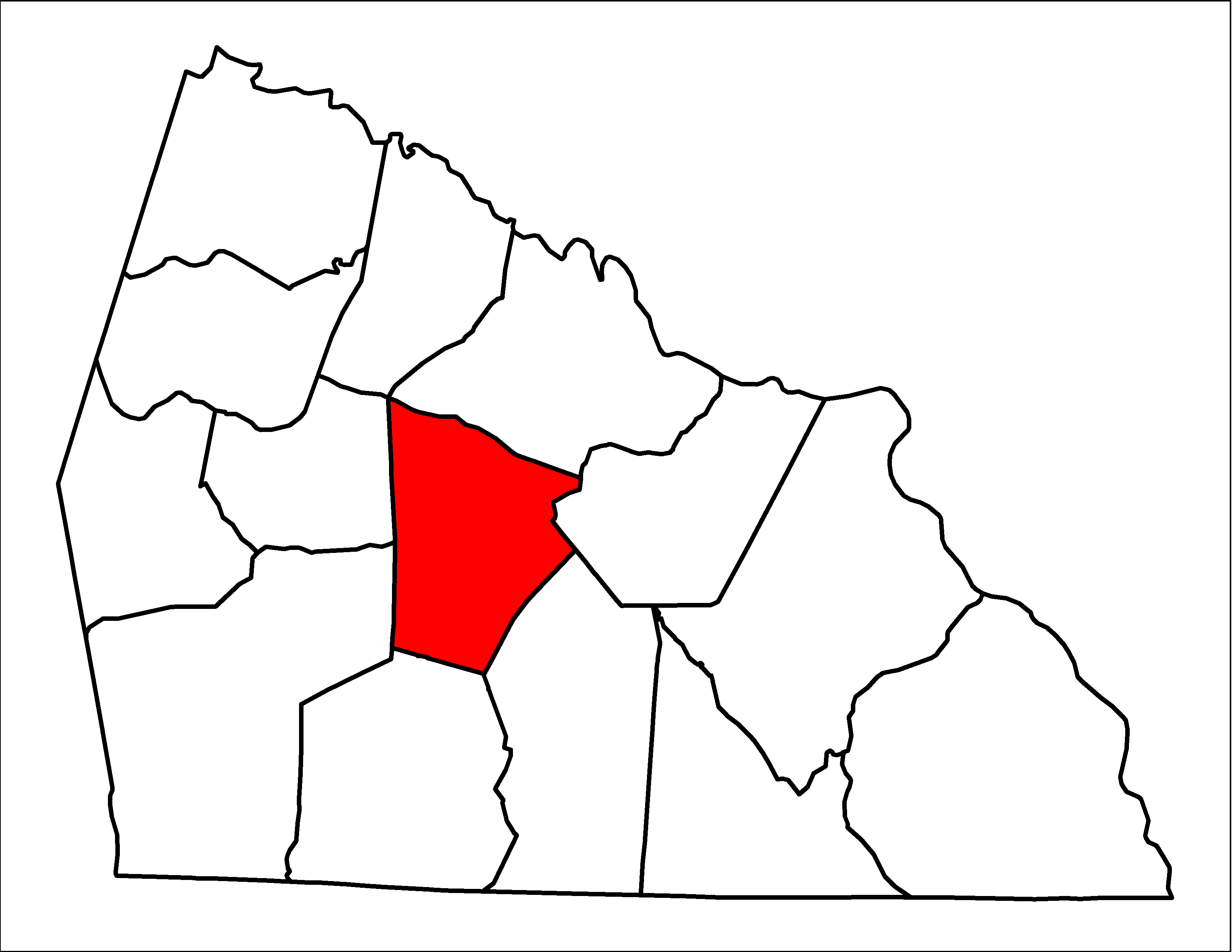
Location of Locke Township in Rowan County, N.C.

Locke Township is one of fourteen townships in Rowan County, North Carolina, United States. The township had a population of 12,401 according to the 2000 census. It was named after General Matthew Locke

Geographically, Locke Township occupies 30.66 square miles (79.4 km^{2}) in central Rowan County. The only incorporated municipality here is a portion of the city of Salisbury, the c ounty seat of Rowan County.
