= Matthew Locke (North Carolina politician) =

American politician

- Born: 1730; Kingdom of Ireland
- Died: September 7, 1801 (aged 70–71); Salisbury, North Carolina, U.S.
- Burial place: Thyatira Presbyterian Church Cemetery, Mill Bridge, Rowan County, North Carolina
- Spouse(s): 1) Mary Brandon, 2) Elizabeth Towers Gostelow
- Relatives: Francis Locke, Sr., Francis Locke, Jr.
- Military career
- Allegiance: United States
- Branch: North Carolina militia
- Service years: 1775-1783
- Rank: Brigadier General (Pro Tempore)
- Units: Rowan County Regiment of the North Carolina militia
- Commands: Rowan County Regiment, Salisbury District Brigade
- Conflicts: American Revolutionary War; Cherokee Expedition

Matthew Locke (1730 – September 7, 1801) was a general during the American Revolutionary War, a wagon driver, and a U.S. Congressman from North Carolina between 1793 and 1799.

== Personal and early Life ==
Locke was born to John Locke (1700, England –c.1744, Lancaster, Pennsylvania) and his wife Elizabeth (c.1705, England –1760, Rowan County, North Carolina) in the northern part of the Kingdom of Ireland, from where his family migrated to Pennsylvania, where his father died. His mother and siblings migrated to North Carolina and settled in Anson County, North Carolina (in an area now part of Rowan County). He was married to Mary (née Brandon) Locke (b. 1735) sometime around 1749 in Rowan County. He married a second time to Elizabeth Towers Gostelowe in 1798.

Locke was the brother of Francis Locke, and the uncle of North Carolina Senator Francis Locke, Jr. He was the great-great-great-grandfather of Arkansas Representative Effiegene Locke Wingo.

== Government and military service ==
Locke was named treasury commissioner of the Province of North Carolina in 1771. He was elected a member of the Rowan County Committee of Safety on August 8, 1774 and to the committee of secrecy, intelligence, and observation of Rowan County on September 23, 1774. Matthew Locke was a Colonel in the Rowan County Regiment of militia from 1775 to 1783 during the American War of Independence. He was also a Brigadier General (Pro Tempore) over the Salisbury District Brigade of militia in 1779, as well as the paymaster of troops.

== Political career ==
Locke was a delegate to the North Carolina Provincial Congress at Hillsborough in 1775 and at Halifax in 1776 when the State Constitution was approved. He served several terms in the legislature, including periods in the North Carolina House of Commons from 1777 to 1781, the North Carolina Senate from 1781 to 1782, and in the House of Commons again from 1783 to 1792. Locke was a delegate to the 1789 state Constitutional Convention Locke was a delegate to the 1789 state Constitutional Convention called to consider ratification of the United States Constitution. Locke voted against ratification.

Affiliated with the United States Democratic-Republican Party, Locke was elected to the 3rd United States Congress in 1792 and served for three consecutive terms (March 4, 1793 - March 3, 1799).

== Later life ==
Locke married Philadelphia widow, Elizabeth Towers Gostelowe, in 1798, before being defeated for re-election.

After retiring from Congress, Locke was engaged as a planter and was an extensive landowner; he died in Salisbury, North Carolina on September 7, 1801, aged 71 years. He is buried in the Thyatira Churchyard, near Salisbury.

U.S. House of Representatives
Preceded by Nathaniel Macon	Member of the U.S. House of Representatives from North Carolina's 2nd congressional district 1793–1799	Succeeded by Archibald Henderson
