= Battle of Ramsour's Mill =

June 20, 1780 battle during the American Revolutionary War

Coordinates: 35.4784°N 81.2591°W

- Part of the American Revolutionary War
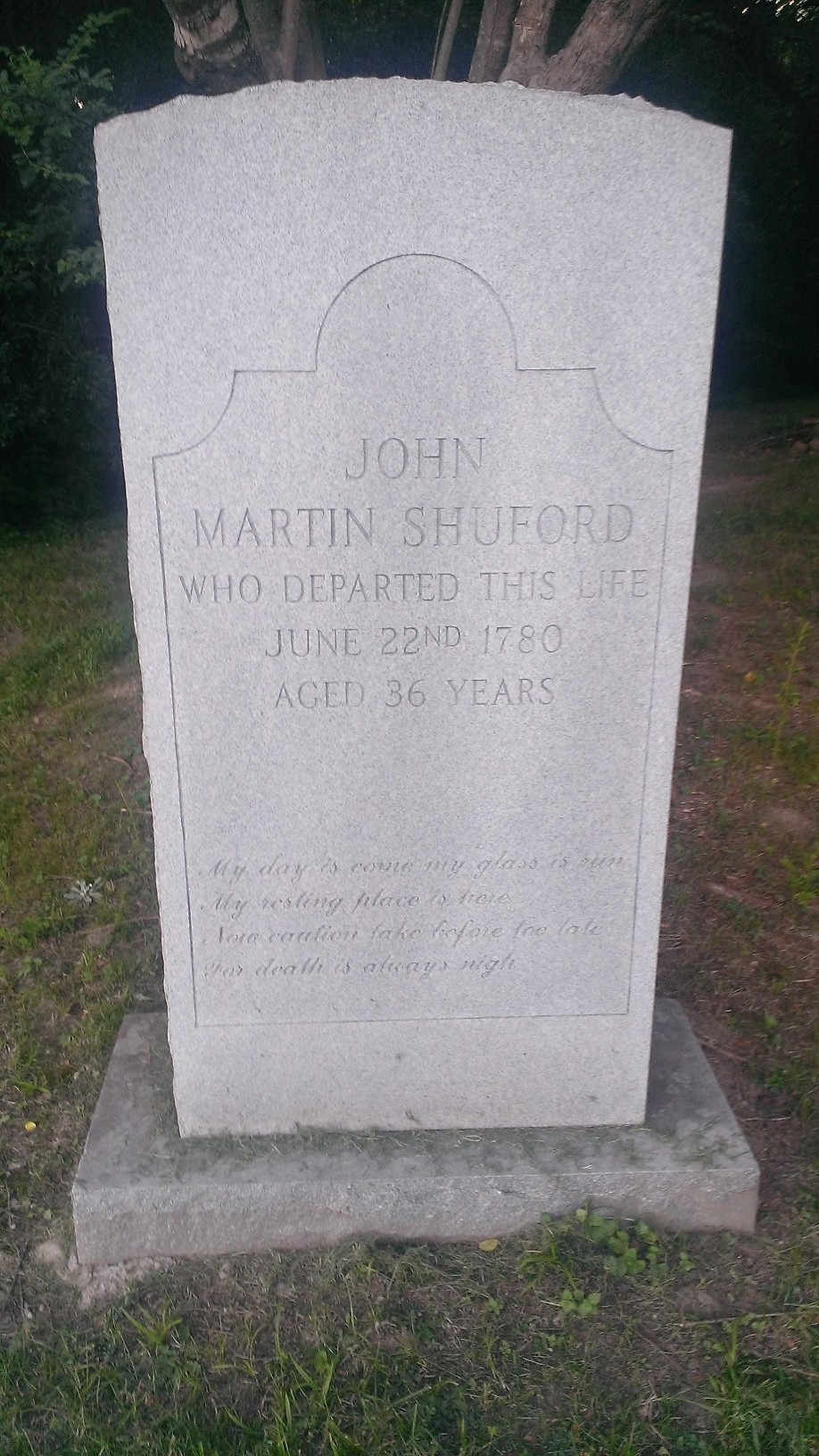
- Dedicated in 1997 by the Lincoln County Historical Association and descendants of John Martin Shuford.
| Date | June 20, 1780 |
| Location | Lincolnton, North Carolina |
| Result | Patriot victory |

Belligerents
| (United States) Patriot militia | (Kingdom of Great Britain) Loyalist militia |

Commanders and leaders
| (United States) Francis Locke (United States) John Dickey | (Kingdom of Great Britain) John Moore (Kingdom of Great Britain) Nicholas Warlick (Kingdom of Great Britain) Abraham Keener |

Strength
| 400 | 1,300 |

Casualties and losses
| Around 150 killed/wounded | 150 killed/wounded 50 captured |

The Battle of Ramsour's Mill took place on June 20, 1780 in present-day Lincolnton, North Carolina, during the British campaign to gain control of the southern colonies in the American Revolutionary War. The number of fighters on each side of the battle is still an issue of contention, but Loyalist militiamen (many of them German Palatine emigrants and settlers in the local area) outnumbered Patriot militia.

The one to two-hour battle during the foggy morning of June 20 did not involve any regular army forces from either side and was literally fought between family, friends, and neighbors with muskets sometimes being used as clubs because of a lack of ammunition. Some cases of fratricide occurred during the battle. Peter Costner, a loyalist, was killed by his brother Thomas who buried his sibling's corpse after the fight. William Simpson, a patriot scout, rushed to the battle desiring to kill his brother; but arrived after the battle was over. He never located his brother Reuben, who had suffered a serious, but non-fatal injury and departed the battlefield earlier. Despite being outnumbered, the Patriot militia defeated the Loyalists.

The battle was significant in that it lowered the morale of Loyalists in the south, weakening their support of the British.

== Background ==
On June 18, 1780, Patriot General Griffith Rutherford, who was camped near Charlotte, North Carolina, learned that a large force of Loyalists was assembling at Ramsour's Mill, near present-day Lincolnton. Rutherford began moving his troops in that direction, and on June 19 he sent orders to Lieutenant Colonel Francis Locke and other local militia leaders to call up their militia.

Locke gathered a force of 400 cavalry and infantry at Mountain Creek, about 16 miles (26 km) to the northeast of Lincolnton. Their intelligence showed that the Loyalist force was more than three times their size, but it was decided to attack early the next morning without waiting for Rutherford's forces to join up due to a fear of reinforcements to the British force. At daybreak on June 20, they were one mile from the Loyalist camp, located on a hill about 300 yards (270 m) east of the mill belonging to Jacob Ramsour.

== Loyalist recruiting ==
Loyalist John Moore had served with the British at the Siege of Charleston and returned to his home a few miles from Ramsour's Mill with tales of battle. He called together a group of about 40 Loyalists on June 10 and shared with them instructions from Cornwallis that for safety they should avoid organizing before British troops entered the area. News came to the meeting that a group of about twenty Patriots was looking for Moore and other Loyalist leaders. Moore and his men decided to find and confront them, but were unsuccessful. Moore then told his men to return home, and instructed them to join him in a few days at Ramsour's Mill. On June 13, 200 men arrived there, and the number grew in the following days, buoyed by news of the British victory at Waxhaws. By June 20 the Loyalist camp had grown to about 1,300 men, but a quarter of them were unarmed.

== Battle ==
When the cavalry leading the Patriot column approached, the Loyalist sentries on the road fired at them and retreated to their main body. After an initial cavalry charge, the Patriot infantry moved up. In the confusion of the battle, the Patriots were able to turn the Loyalists' flank and gain control of the ridge. General Rutherford, then only a few miles from Ramsour's Mill, received word of the action and immediately dispatched his cavalry to assist and hurried the infantry along.

Patriot Colonel Francis Locke was unable to reform his line on the ridge and ordered his men to fall back. However, Captain John Dickey refused and led his company to higher ground, where the rifle marksmanship of Captain John Hardin's men turned the battle into victory. When ordered to retreat by Colonel Locke, he had soundly cursed (Presbyterian elder though he was), saying he would not retreat. Captain Dickey was credited with saving the day at the battle.

Neither side in the battle wore military uniforms. Tories wore a green pine twig in their hats, and Whigs wore a piece of white paper (flag) in their hats. Several of the Whigs were found shot through the head afterwards.

The Patriot soldiers composed a ballad, which for many years was sung about the countryside in Captain Dickey's honor. Only one verse is preserved in the National Archives in Washington:

"Old Colonel Locke kept pretty well back,
While brave Captain Dickey commenced the attack.
He, Colonel Locke, ordered us to retreat and reform,
Which made our old hero mightily storm."

One affidavit in the National Archives Pension Files tells that Captain Dickey called out, “Shoot straight, my boys, and keep on fighting. I see some of them beginning to tumble.” According to the most reliable account of the battle, by General Joseph Graham in 1825, the fighting between family, friends, and neighbors was often brutal and intense:

When the Tories were driven back the second time, and the left of their line became mixed with the Whigs, a Dutchman (of the Tories) meeting suddenly with an acquaintance of the Whigs addressed him, "Hey, how do you do, [B]illy? I has known you since you was a little boy, and I would not hurt one hair of your head, because I has never known no harm of you, only that you was a rebel." Billy, who was not so generous, and was much agitated, and his gun being empty, clubbed it and made a blow at the Dutchman's head, which he dodged. The Dutchman cried out, "Oh, stop, stop! I is not going to stand still and be killed like a damned fool neder," and raised the butt of his gun and made a blow at Billy's head, which he missed, and one of Billy's comrades, whose piece was loaded, clapped his muzzle under the Dutchman's arm and the poor fellow fell dead...

However, there are also some examples of compassion on both sides of the battle:

Captain M'Kissick was wounded early in the action, being shot through the top of the shoulder; and finding himself disabled, went from the battleground about 80 poles to the west. About the time the firing ceased he met ten of the Tories coming from a neighboring farm, where they had been until the sound of the firing started them. They were confident their side was victorious, and several of them knowing Captain M'Kissick, insulted him and would have used him ill, but for Abra[ha]m Keener Sr., one of his neighbors, who protected and took him prisoner. While marching on towards the battle ground Keener kept lamenting, "That a man so clever and such a good neighbor and of such good sense should ever be a rebel." He continued his lecture to Captain M'Kissick until they came where the Whigs were formed. Keener looking around and seeing so many strange faces, said, "Hey, boys, I believe you has got a good many prisoners here." Immediately a number of guns were cocked, and Captain M'Kissick, though much exhausted by loss of blood, had to exert himself to save the lives of Keener and party.

The Loyalists were soon in disarray, and many fled. When Colonel Rutherford reached the field he was met by a white flag, and the Loyalists requested a truce to treat the wounded. Rutherford, whose entire force had yet to arrive, instead demanded an immediate surrender. As the discussions went on, most of the remaining Loyalists fled, and only about 50 were taken prisoner.

== Order of battle ==
=== Patriots ===
Commanding Officer: Col. Francis Locke

North Carolina militia:

- 1st Rowan County Regiment of the North Carolina militia led by Col. Francis Locke, Maj. Thomas McGuire, and Maj. James Rutherford, with fifteen known companies
- 2nd Rowan County Regiment of the North Carolina militia led by Lt. Col. Frederick Hambright and Maj. William Stewart, with nine known companies
- Surry County Regiment of the North Carolina militia detachment led by Lt. Col. William Shepherd (Wilkes) and Maj. Richard Goode, with two known companies
- Mecklenburg County Regiment of the North Carolina militia detachment led by Maj. Robert Wilson and Maj. James Harris, with thirteen known companies
- Burke County Regiment of the North Carolina militia led by Lt. Col. Hugh Brevard, Lt. Col. Robert Holmes, and Maj. Joseph McDowell, with eighteen known companies
- Lincoln County Regiment of the North Carolina militia detachment, led by Lt. Col. Robert Smith, Maj. Francis McCorkle, and Maj. David Wilson, with seven known companies
- Rutherford County Regiment of the North Carolina militia detachment of three known companies, led by:
- Orange County Regiment of the North Carolina militia detachment led by Maj. William Armstrong (killed), acting as a Captain over a small company of men.
- Edgecombe County Regiment of the Halifax District Brigade, North Carolina militia detachment of one known company

South Carolina Militia - Unknown number of men in the following units:

- 2nd Spartan Regiment detachment led by Col. Thomas Brandon, with three known companies
- New Acquisition District Regiment detachment led by Maj. Joseph Dickson, with three known companies
- Turkey Creek Regiment detachment of one known company
- Little River Regiment detachment of one known company
- Upper Craven County Regiment detachment of one known company

== Aftermath ==
Casualties were difficult to assign since almost no one was wearing any sort of uniform. Estimates of dead on each side were between 50 and 70, with about 100 wounded on each side. The battle, in which muskets were sometimes used as clubs because of little ammunition, was fought between "neighbors, near relations, and friends". Many bodies lay scattered over the hill in the aftermath, and many dead we buried on the hill by their grieving wives, mothers, and children.

Loyalists were imprisoned, and their property was seized in the aftermath. Six years after the battle, Abraham Keener was summoned by the Sheriff to help build a road from Beatties Ford to Lincolnton as punishment for his involvement in the battle. However, according to one account of the battle's aftermath published in 1979 by Robert O. DeMond: "Of the Tories captured, all were paroled except a few who had committed serious depredations, and these were placed in the Salisbury jail. Those who were paroled were as honest now in keeping their new pact as they had been before in keeping their former one to the King. Many of us believe that Abraham Keener was one of this group who changed his allegiance and became a loyal Patriot."

Loyalist James Karr wrote to his old friend Patriot General Griffith Rutherford, who he had served with in the Cherokee War of 1776, for reconciliation and help in regaining his confiscated property and reuniting with family. Rutherford rebuffed his request, telling Karr: "As to your General Conduct an Honest Neighbor you have cause to think you desarve my countenance, but as an open enemy you must know that you desarve none."

Their defeat so badly demoralized the Loyalists that they never organized again in that area. Moore and about 30 men managed to reach Cornwallis at Camden, where Cornwallis threatened him with charges for disobeying his orders. Lieutenant Colonel Turnbull wrote to Cornwallis that "had it not been for the Weak Silly man Moore who led a Parcell of those poor Innocent Devils of North Carolina into a Scrape, we should have been now in Perfect Peace on this Frontier." As for the majority Scots-Irish inhabitants of the Catawba River Valley, Turnbull wrote: "I wish I could say something in their favor. I Believe them to be the worst of Creation - and Nothing will Bring them to Reason but Severity."

=== Historic Preservation ===
The Lincoln County Historical Association has done some historic preservation of the site (behind what is now Lincolnton High School) and an archaeological investigation of the mass graves has been completed. In 1997 the Lincoln County Historical Association and descendants of Loyalist John Martin Shuford dedicated a new monument to Shuford's memory and moved his original grave marker to the Lincoln County Museum of History.
