= Francis Locke Jr. =

American politician

Francis Locke

United States Senator from North Carolina
- In office December 1814 – December 5, 1815
- Preceded by: David Stone
- Succeeded by: Nathaniel Macon

Personal details
- Born: October 31, 1766 Rowan County, North Carolina
- Died: January 8, 1823 (aged 56) Rowan County, North Carolina
- Party: Democratic-Republican

Francis Locke Jr. (October 31, 1766 – January 8, 1823) was a U.S. senator from the state of North Carolina.

== Family ==
Francis Locke was the son of Francis Locke Sr. (1722–1796) (a Revolutionary War Officer) and Anna Brandon (b.1734). All are buried at Thyatira Cemetery in Rowan County, North Carolina.

== Career ==
A native of Rowan County, North Carolina, and a judge of the Superior Court of North Carolina from 1803 to 1814, he was elected to the Senate in 1814 to fill a vacancy caused by the resignation of David Stone, but resigned in 1815, before he could qualify.

U.S. Senate
Preceded by David Stone	U.S. senator (Class 3) from North Carolina; 1814–1815; Served alongside: James Turner	Succeeded by Nathaniel Macon
