= Griffith Rutherford =

Revolutionary War officer (c. 1721 – 1805)

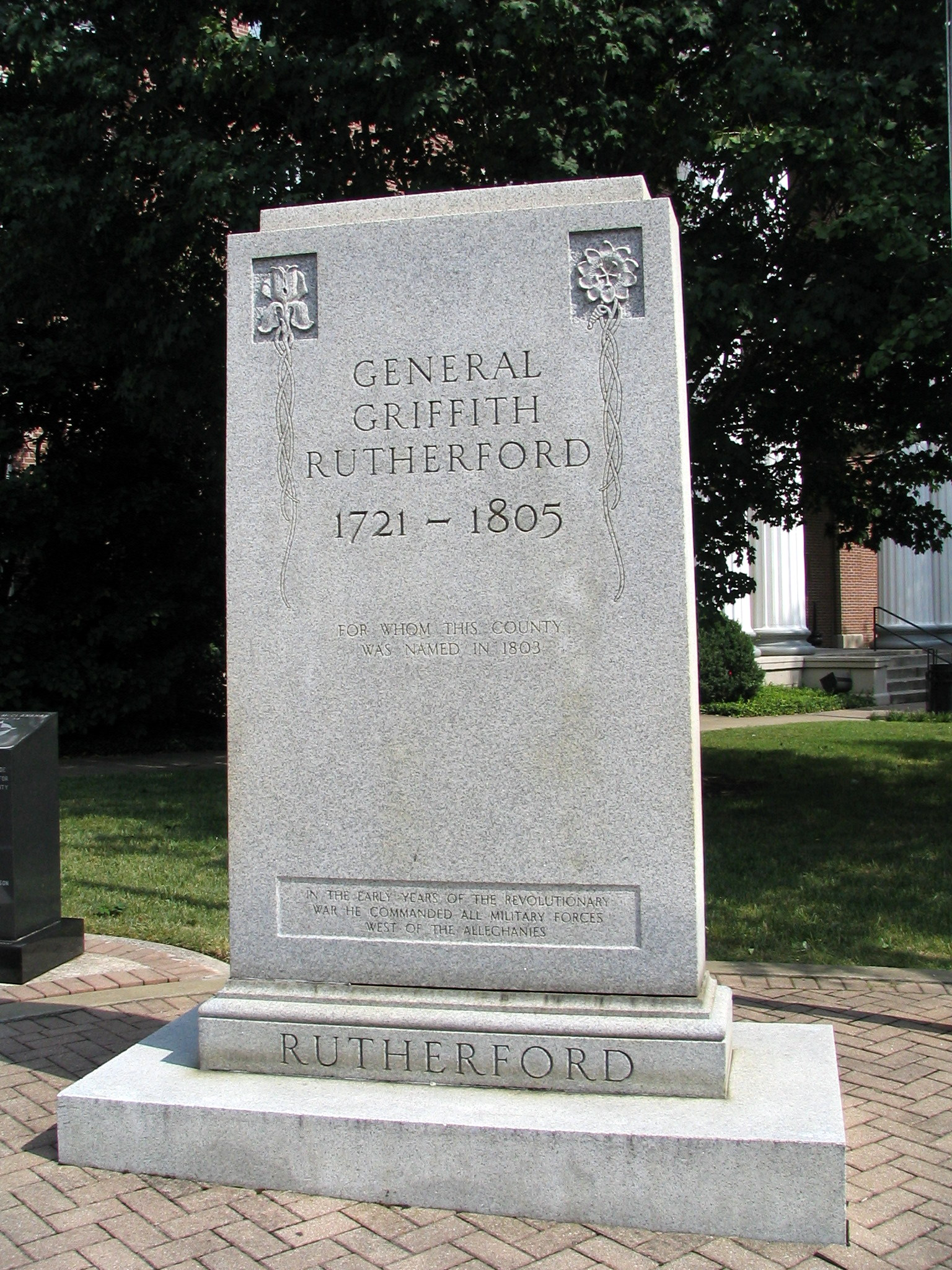
- Memorial for Griffith Rutherford in Murfreesboro, Tennessee
- Born: 1721; Ireland
- Died: August 10, 1805 (aged 84); Sumner County, Tennessee, U.S.
- Relatives: Married to Elizabeth Graham
- Military career
- Allegiance: Great Britain; United States
- Branch: North Carolina militia
- Service years: Colonial Militia 1760–1775 North Carolina Militia 1775–1783
- Rank: Colonial Militia: Captain 1760; Colonel 1772; North Carolina Militia: Colonel December 21, 1775; Brigadier General April 22, 1776
- Units: North Carolina militia
- Commands: Salisbury District Brigade, Rowan County Regiment
- Conflicts: French and Indian War; Battle of Fort Duquesne; Anglo-Cherokee War; War of the Regulation; Battle of Alamance; American Revolutionary War; Snow Campaign; Battle of McDowell's Station; Battle of Camden; Battle of Ramsour's Mill; Battle of Raft Swamp; Cherokee–American wars; Second Cherokee War; Second Invasion of Chickamauga Towns
- Other work: Served in the North Carolina senate, settled in Sumner County, Tennessee, became President of the Legislative Council of the Southwest Territory (Tennessee)

Signature
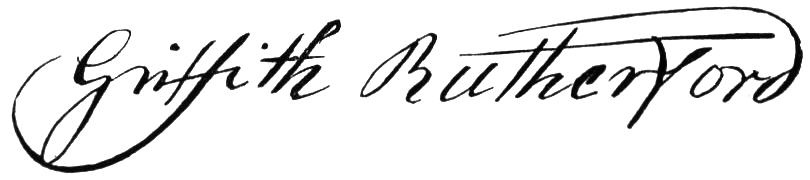

Griffith Rutherford (c. 1721 – August 10, 1805) was an American military officer in the Revolutionary War and the Cherokee-American Wars, a political leader in North Carolina, and an important figure in the early history of the Southwest Territory and the state of Tennessee.

Originally from Ireland, Rutherford immigrated with his parents to Philadelphia, Pennsylvania Colony, at the age of 18. In 1753, he moved to Rowan County, in the Province of North Carolina, where he married Elizabeth Graham.

During the French and Indian War, Rutherford became a captain in the North Carolina Militia. He continued serving in the militia until the start of the American Revolution in 1775, when he enlisted in the North Carolina militia as a colonel. He was appointed to the post of brigadier general of the "Salisbury District Brigade" in May 1776, and he participated in the initial phases of the wars against the Cherokee Indians along the frontier. In June 1780, Rutherford was partly responsible for the Loyalist defeat in the Battle of Ramsour's Mill. He was present at the Battle of Camden on August 16, 1780, and was taken prisoner by the British. After a prisoner exchange in 1781, Rutherford participated in several other campaigns, including further attacks on the Chickamauga faction of the Cherokee.

An active member of his community, Rutherford served in multiple civil occupations. He was a representative of both houses of the North Carolina House of Commons and as an unsuccessful candidate for governor. Rutherford was an Anti-Federalist and was appointed President of the Legislative Council of the Southwest Territory in 1794. He retired to Sumner County, Tennessee, where he died on August 10, 1805, at the age of 84.

== Early life ==
Little is known about Rutherford's early life. Born in Ireland in either 1721 or 1731 to John Rutherford, who was of Ulster Scots descent, and Elizabeth (née Griffin), who was of Welsh descent, Griffith appears clearly in records after his immigration to Philadelphia at the age of 18. His parents died during the voyage from Ireland, and for a while, he worked on a relative's farm, where he was taught how to survey land. In around 1753, he moved to Rowan County, North Carolina Colony and bought a tract of land about seven miles (11 km) from Salisbury, which was the first of several land purchases that he would make in the 1750s. In 1754, Rutherford married his neighbor's sister, Elizabeth Graham, who eventually bore him ten children.

One of their sons, James Rutherford, later became a major during the Revolutionary War and died at the Battle of Eutaw Springs. Rutherford also became friends with Daniel Boone with whom he often went on hunting and surveying expeditions.

After the French and Indian War, Rutherford became increasingly active in community affairs. He was listed as a member of the North Carolina General Assembly in 1766, a sheriff and justice of the peace of Rowan County from 1767 to 1769, and a tax collector.

== French and Indian War ==
Rutherford began his extensive military career in 1760 during the French and Indian War. He was a participant in several battles and skirmishes, most notably the Battle of Fort Duquesne (1758); the battle at Fort Dobbs (1760); and James Grant's campaign against the Cherokee in the southern Appalachians (1761). By the war's end, Rutherford had achieved the rank of captain. Between 1769 and 1771, he embraced the cause against the rebels during the Regulator Movement and commanded a local militia that participated in the Battle of Alamance (May 16, 1771). The following month, Rutherford retired to Salem to recover from an acute attack of gout.

== Revolutionary War ==
Rutherford entered the war in 1775 as a colonel in the North Carolina militia after his appointment to the Rowan County Committee of Safety. Throughout that year, his regiment helped to disarm and disperse Loyalist groups in the South Carolina back country, most notably during the Snow Campaign in Ninety Six, South Carolina. Rutherford represented Rowan County at the Fourth Provincial Congress in Halifax, from April 4 to May 14, 1776, during which he helped develop and write the North Carolina Constitution and was promoted to brigadier general of the Salisbury District Brigade. In the summer after the conference, he raised an army of 2,400 men to campaign against local Cherokee Indians, who had been attacking colonists on the western frontier since their alliance with the British.

=== Campaign against Cherokee ===
Rutherford's regiment rendezvoused at Fort McGahey with the Guilford and Surry County regiments under Colonels James Martin and Martin Armstrong on July 23, 1776. From there, the three groups traveled through the Blue Ridge Mountains at the Swannanoa Gap, passed up the valley of Hominy Creek, and crossed the Pigeon River. They then passed through Richland Creek, near the present-day town of Waynesville, North Carolina, and crossed the Tuckasegee River near an Indian settlement. They moved further onwards towards the Cowee Gap, where they had a small engagement with a band of Cherokee in which one of Rutherford's men was wounded. After that conflict, they marched to the Overhill Cherokee "Middle Towns" (on the Tennessee River), where he met General Andrew Williamson of South Carolina on September 14 at Hiwassee. Williamson was on a similar mission and readily joined forces with the original three regiments.

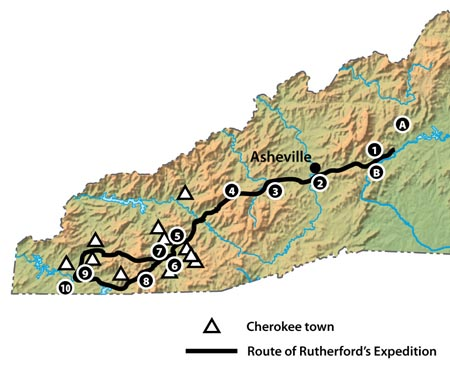
Map of the route taken by Rutherford that is now known as the Rutherford Trace

The now-four regiments skirmished with hostile Indians at Valley Town, Ellijay, and near the southern Watauga settlements (present day northeast Tennessee). Eventually, the Indian tribes were subdued at the cost of three fatalities to Rutherford's regiment. Casualties to the Indians, however, were severe. By the end of the conflict, the four regiments had destroyed 36 Indian towns, decimated acres of corn farms, and chased off most of the Indians' cattle. Afterwards, Rutherford returned home by the same route. He arrived back in Salisbury in early October, where he disbanded his troops.

Later that month, Rutherford authorized another punitive expedition, called the Rutherford Light Horse expedition, of a recently raised cavalry force, led by Captain William Moore joined by Captain Joseph Hardin Sr., of the Tryon County Regiment (North Carolina), to attack the Middle Towns.

=== Southern theater ===
British strategists viewed the southern colonies, especially lightly-populated Georgia, as the most vulnerable of all. Despite early victories won by the Patriots at Charleston and other settlements, the South became the focus of a British attack starting in 1778. Governor Richard Caswell of North Carolina identified the threat and immediately ordered the militia to regroup. Rutherford, who had been checking on Loyalists since his return to Salisbury in 1776, received word by October. Caswell and Rutherford met in Kinston, North Carolina, on November 25 to discuss the specifics of Rutherford's assignment. Apparently, a fleet of British ships was en route from New York City and heavily endangered key coastal cities. Rutherford amassed a force, which reached the border of South Carolina by early December, and proceeded to establish headquarters near Savannah in Purrysburg, South Carolina, the following month.

With the cities of Savannah and Augusta taken by February, the campaign was severely weakened. Rutherford moved his troops near Augusta, where he supported General John Ashe during the Battle of Brier Creek on March 3. Soldiers' enlistments soon began expiring, and by April 10, most of Rutherford's forces had returned to North Carolina.

The loss of Charleston in 1780 was a huge blow to the Patriot cause and posed a significant threat to neighboring North Carolina, which lacked adequate defenses due to expiring enlistments. Rutherford saw the danger by calling back his remaining troops stationed in South Carolina and ordering all soldiers from Salisbury to rally near Charlotte, North Carolina. A force of 900 had accumulated by early June.

==== Battle of Ramsour's Mill ====
After rallying troops at Charlotte, Rutherford received information that Loyalists were gathering at arms at Ramsour's Mill, near present-day Lincolnton, North Carolina, and issued orders for local officers to disperse the group before they evolved into an even greater threat. After collecting troops from Rowan and Mecklenburg Counties, Rutherford moved his men to the Catawba River and crossed it at the Tuckasegee Ford on June 19. He sent word to Colonel Francis Locke of Rowan County, to rendezvous with him about 16 miles (26 km) from Ramsour's Mill, near the forks of the Catawba. Locke accumulated a force of 400 men and encamped at Mountain Creek, which was 35 miles (56 km) away from Rutherford's position but still approximately the same distance from Ramsour's Mill as Rutherford's position was. It was resolved by Locke and his officers that a junction with Rutherford was unrealistic because of the distance between the two regiments and the limited amount of time before the Loyalist group grew too large to engage safely, Therefore, it was decided that Locke's forces would attack the Loyalist position immediately. Colonel Johnson, one of Locke's subordinates, informed Rutherford of the new situation by 10:00 p.m.

Locke's forces left their encampment late in the evening of June 19 and had arrived at the Loyalist position by the early morning of June 20. The Patriots took the Loyalists by surprise. While at first bewildered and confused, the Loyalists retaliated by firing at Locke's cavalry, which wad forced to fall back. The Patriots eventually forced the Loyalists to retreat to their camp, but the Patriots were discovered to be regrouping on the other side of the mill stream. Then, since an immediate attack from the Loyalists was expected, messages were sent to Rutherford, who had advanced to within six miles (9.7 km) of Ramsour's Mill, to move forward immediately. Rutherford met Locke within 2 miles (3.2 km) of Ramsour's Mill, where he was informed that the Loyalists were in full retreat.

==== Battle of Camden ====
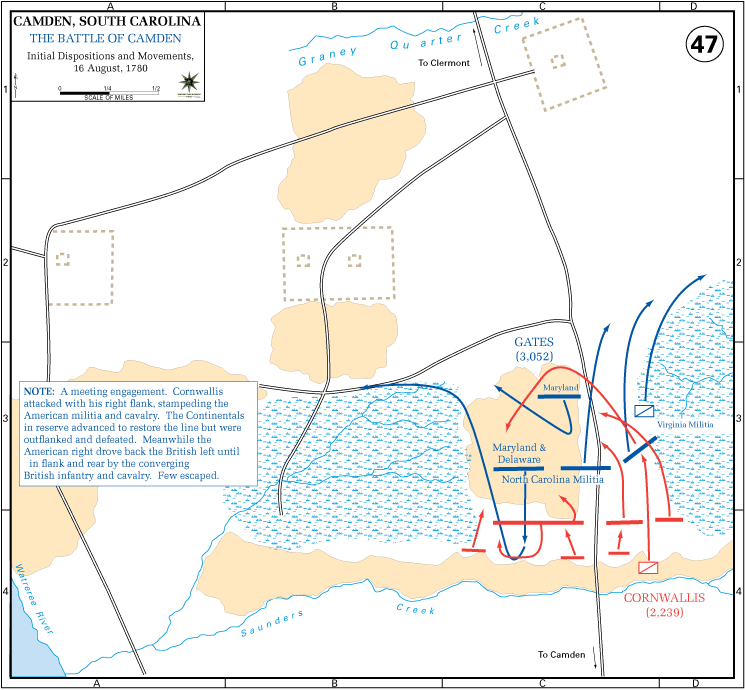
Battle of Camden. Rutherford and other North Carolina militia were in the center of the American formation.

The losses at Savannah, Charleston, and the Wexhams had practically driven the Continental Army from the South, with state defenses reduced to a number of locally led partisan militias. In response to the loss of military presence, Congress sent Horatio Gates, who had distinguished himself at Saratoga, to reform the Continental Army in Charlotte, North Carolina. Against the advice of his officers and without knowing the capabilities of his troops, some of whom were untested in battle, Gates marched toward South Carolina on July 27 with over 4,000 men. He aimed to capturing the crossroads town of Camden, South Carolina, which would have been strategically important for control over the South Carolina back country. Lord Rawdon, who was stationed there with 1,000 men, alerted Lord Cornwallis of Gates's movements on August 9. Cornwallis arrived at Camden by August 13 with reinforcements, which increased the British presence there to over 2,000 men.

The battle ensued at dawn on August 16, 1780. Rutherford was positioned in the center of the Continental formation with other North Carolina militia. During the battle, he was wounded and taken prisoner. He was detained for ten months at Castillo de San Marcos in St. Augustine, Florida, and was exchanged for another prisoner in 1781.

=== Later war ===
Rutherford returned to Salisbury in September 1781 after his release to find that his home had been ransacked by British troops. After a short reunion with his family, Rutherford trained and took command of 1,400 men of the Salisbury District Brigade and allegedly began to attack Tory militias and communities brutally, according to several reports sent to his superior, General Greene. Rutherford's tactics were criticized by Green, who warned Rutherford that those methods would only encourage the Loyalist cause. Those reports were later found to be false, but Rutherford decided to redirect his forces towards the British encampment and surrounding militias at Wilmington, North Carolina, beginning with the Loyalist force at Raft Swamp. In October and November, Rutherford continued to force the Loyalists into Wilmington, eventually surrounded the city, and successfully cut off British communications and supply lines. The commanding British officer, Major Craig, was soon informed of Cornwallis's surrender at Yorktown, and his forces at Wilmington were hastily evacuated.

After Wilmington, Rutherford again fought the Chickamauga in the west in 1782 and followed the same route that he had taken seven years earlier. No known accounts were written of the campaign though it was reportedly successful.

== Later life ==
Rutherford was elected to the North Carolina Senate during the war in 1779 and continued to serve in that position until 1789. He opposed the restoration of Loyalist lands and supported and assisted in their confiscation while he served in the Council of State. Rutherford ran unsuccessfully for governor in 1783.

He was an ardent Anti-Federalist during the national debate on the recently created United States Constitution. At the constitutional convention held at Hillsborough, North Carolina, in 1788, he had reservations about the Constitution, like other Anti-Federalists at the meeting. Rutherford requested to challenge some of the clauses. Each clause was challenged individually despite opposition from the Federalist Samuel Johnston and others, but Rutherford rarely contributed to discussion. His final decision to vote against the ratification of the Constitution resulted in him losing his seat in the State Senate. However, his reputation with his colleagues was relatively unaffected, and he was subsequently elected Councilor of the State.

Rutherford acquired nearly 13,000 acres of Washington District land through trading off his 700 acres in Salisbury, government grants and purchasing Continental soldier's tracts. With his family and eight slaves Rutherford relocated to the area in what is today Sumner County, Tennessee, in September 1792. Two years later, he was appointed President of the Legislative Council of the Southwest Territory.

Rutherford died in Sumner County, Tennessee, on August 10, 1805.

== Legacy ==
These areas are all namesakes of Griffith Rutherford:

- Rutherfordton, North Carolina
- Rutherford County, North Carolina
- Rutherford County, Tennessee

== See also ==
- List of North Carolina militia units in the American Revolution

== Sources ==
- Ashe, Samuel A'Court (1905). Biographical history of North Carolina from colonial times to the present, Volume 2. Greenboro: C. L. Van Noppen. OCLC 4243114.
- Clark, Walter (1886). The State Records of North Carolina, Volume 25. Goldsboro: Nash Brothers printing co. OCLC 1969836.
- Harrison, Henry William (1858). Battlefields and Naval Exploits of the United States: from Lexington to the City of Mexico. Philadelphia: H. C. Peck & T. Bliss. OCLC 9570227. "Battlefields and Naval Exploits of the United States: from Lexington to the City of Mexico."
- Hunter, C. L. (1877). Sketches of western North Carolina: Historical and Biographical. Raleigh: Raleigh News Steam Job Print. OCLC 1936249. "Sketches of western North Carolina: Historical and Biographical."
- Lossing, Benson John (1852). The Pictorial Field-Book of the Revolution. Manhattan: Harper & Bros. OCLC 638846585. "The Pictorial Field-Book of the Revolution."
- MacDonald, James M (2006). Politics of the Personal in the Old North State: Griffith Rutherford in Revolutionary North Carolina (PDF). ISBN 978-0-542-56459-8. Archived from the original (PDF) on 2010-07-23.
- Russell, David Lee (2000). The American Revolution in the Southern Colonies. Jefferson, North Carolina: McFarland. ISBN 9780786407835.
- Wakelyn, John L. (2004). Birth of the Bill of Rights: Major Writings. Westport, Connecticut: Greenwood Publishing Group. ISBN 9780313331954.
- Wheeler, John Hill (1851). Historical Sketches of North Carolina: from 1584 to 1851. Philadelphia: Lippincott, Grambo and Co. OCLC 221298491. "Historical Sketches of North Carolina: from 1584 to 1851."
