= Francis Locke Sr. =

Plantation owner, businessman, politician; hero at Battle of Ramseur's Mill

Colonel Francis Locke Sr.
- Born: Francis Locke; 1732; Lancaster, Pennsylvania
- Died: 1796, age 64 Years; Mill Bridge, North Carolina
- Burial place: Thyatira Presbyterian Church cemetery
- Spouse: Anna Brandon
- Relatives: Matthew Locke, brother; Francis Locke Jr., son
- Military career
- Allegiance: French-Indian War: United Kingdom; War of Independence: United States
- Rank: colonel
- Commands: Rowan County Regiment of militia, 2nd Rowan County Regiment, 2nd Battalion of Volunteers,
- Conflicts: Snow Campaign (1775); Light Horse Expedition (1776); Battle of Brier Creek (1779); Battle of Ramseur's Mill (1780); Battle of Colson's Mill (1781); Siege of Ninety-Six

Francis Locke Sr. (1732–1796) was a plantation owner, businessman, politician, and a participant in the American War of Independence, where he led the American Patriots to the decisive victory at Ramseur's Mill, which turned the tide of the American War for Independence in the south.

== Personal and family life ==
Francis Locke was born in 1732 in Lancaster, Pennsylvania. He was the son of John Locke, Sr. and Elizabeth Locke. After his father died in 1744, his mother married John Brandon, who eventually moved the family to Anson County, North Carolina Colony. That area of the county was later split off as Rowan County, North Carolina.

Locke settled a plantation near Salisbury, in Rowan County, in 1753, on 640 acres of land he had purchased from his step-father. He and his brother, Matthew Locke, ran a regional transportation company with several wagons based out of the plantation.

In the 1760s and early 1770s, Locke was an ordinary owner, as well as holding several Rowan county governmental positions, including coroner. He worked from 1764 to 1766 as Rowan County sheriff, succeeding Griffith Rutherford, during the War of the Regulation.

Locke married Anna (née Brandon) Locke. They were the parents of four sons and three daughters. Son, Francis Locke Jr., became a Congressman and superior court judge.

== Military career ==
During the French and Indian Wars, Locke was made an ensign in a militia commanded by Rutherford (1759). He saw several battles during the Revolutionary War as well. Locke was a member of the 1775 "Snow Campaign", and in 1776, commanded the Rowan County Regiment of militia as part of the Light Horse Expedition (August – November 1776) led by General Rutherford against the Cherokee on the western frontier.

Revolutionary War service:

- Lt. Colonel, in the Rowan County Regiment of the North Carolina militia (1775)
- Colonel over the 1st Rowan County Regiment of the North Carolina militia (1775-1776)
- Colonel over the 2nd Battalion of Volunteers in the Halifax District Brigade of the North Carolina militia (1776-1777)
- Colonel over the Rowan County Regiment of North Carolina militia (1777-1782)
- Colonel over the 1st Rowan County Regiment of North Carolina militia (1782-1783)

=== Ramseur's Mill ===
On June 18, 1780, Rutherford learned that a large force of Loyalists, or "Tories," was assembling at Ramseur's Mill (near present-day Lincolnton). Rutherford began moving his troops in that direction, and on June 19, he sent orders to Lieutenant Colonel Locke and the other militia leaders in the region to call up their men. Locke quickly gathered a force of 400 cavalry and infantry at Mountain Creek about 16 miles (26 km) to the northeast of Lincolnton. Locke and his second-in-command, Captain John Dickey, decided to attack early the next morning—without waiting for Rutherford's forces to join up—counting on the element of surprise to be to their advantage. The threat of expected additional reinforcements to the Tory force also compelled them to this action.

The battle, in which muskets were sometimes used as clubs because of a lack of ammunition, was fought between "neighbors, near relations, and friends". At first, the battle went Locke's way. When the battle turned against the Patriots, however, Locke ordered a retreat, but Dickey stubbornly refused to retreat from the superior force, and instead sought higher ground, and dug in. Following this, most of Locke's men returned to the battle, flanking the Tories. Dickey is credited with turning the tide of battle. The action delayed the Loyalists long enough for Rutherford's forward detachment to arrive and force the Loyalist surrender. The defeat so badly demoralized the mid-southern Loyalists that they could never organize again in that region.

=== Other action ===
Locke also was involved in engagements at Battle of Ninety-Six (November 1775); the Brier Creek expedition (1779); Colson's Mill (July 1780), and in Nathanael Greene's "Race to the Dan" (1782). On November 8, 1784, he resigned his commission and retired from the military. In 1794 the Rowan court appointed Locke to succeed William Sharpe as attorney for the state.

== Death ==
Locke died in early 1796, and is buried in the Thyatira Presbyterian Church cemetery, Mill Bridge, North Carolina.
