= Rowan County, North Carolina =

County in North Carolina, United States

- County
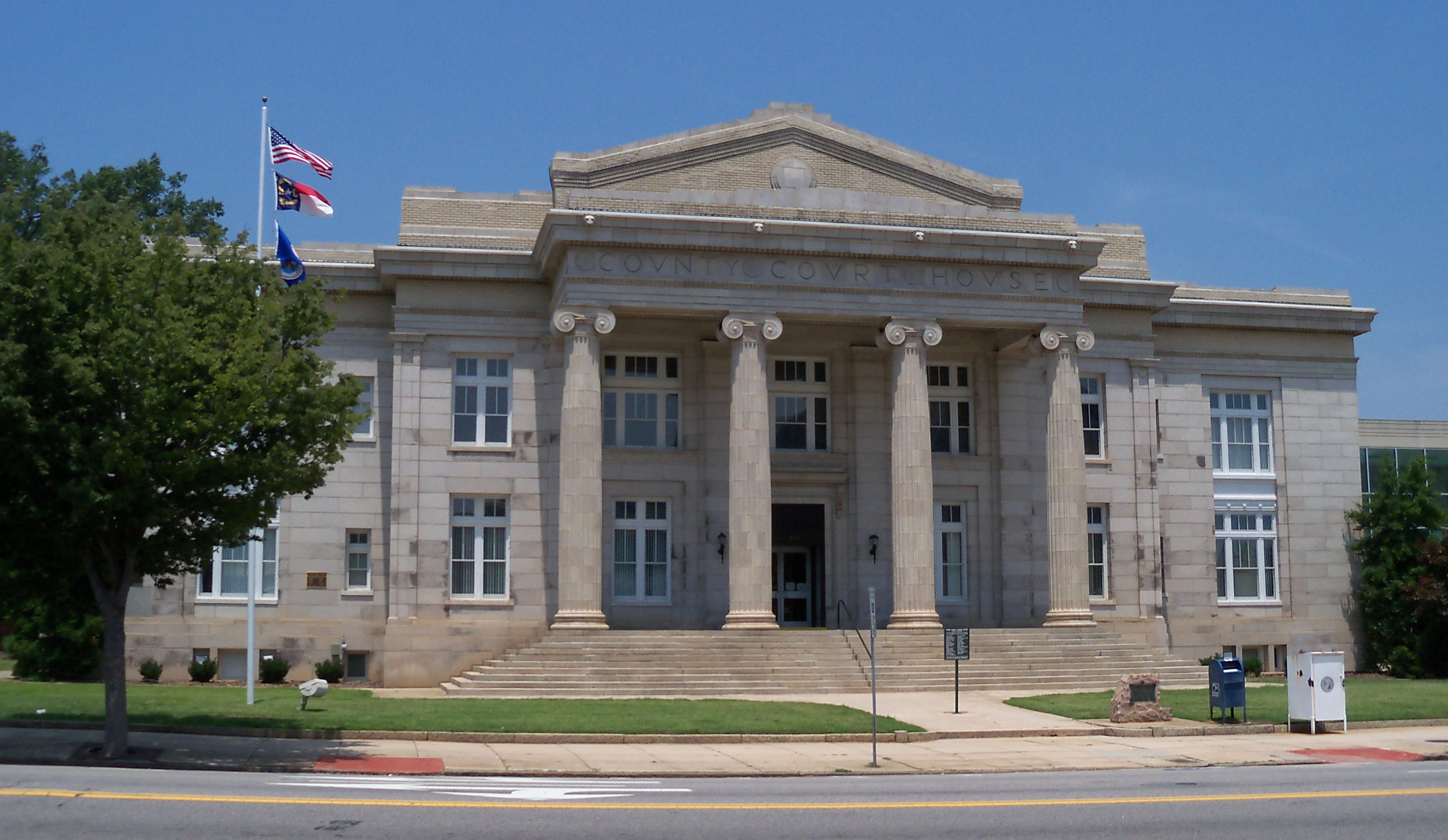
- Rowan County Courthouse in Salisbury

- Flag Seal Logo
- Motto: "Be an original."
- Location within the U.S. state of North Carolina
- Coordinates: 35.64°N 80.52°W
- Country: United States
- State: North Carolina
- Established: March 27, 1753 (273 years ago)
- Named for: Matthew Rowan
- Seat: Salisbury
- Largest community: Salisbury

Area
  - Total: 523.95 sq mi (1,357.0 km^{2})
  - Land: 511.61 sq mi (1,325.1 km^{2})
  - Water: 12.34 sq mi (32.0 km^{2}) 2.36%

Population (2020)
  - Total: 146,875
  - Estimate (2025): 155,096 ▲
  - Density: 287.08/sq mi (110.84/km^{2})
- Time zone: UTC−5 (Eastern)
  - Summer (DST): UTC−4 (EDT)
- Congressional district: 6th
- Website: rowancountync.gov

Rowan County (/roʊˈæn/ roh-AN) is a county in the U.S. state of North Carolina. As of the 2020 census, its population was 146,875. Its county seat, Salisbury, is the oldest continuously populated European-American town in the western half of North Carolina. Rowan County is located northeast of Charlotte, and is considered part of the Charlotte metropolitan area.

Established in 1753 from the upper part of Anson County, it was named after acting North Carolina governor Matthew Rowan. Originally a vast territory with unlimited western boundaries, Rowan County was reduced in size to 524 square miles (1,360 km^{2}) after several counties were formed from it in the 18th and 19th centuries.

== History ==
=== 16th century ===
The first Europeans to enter what is now Rowan County were members of the Spanish expedition of Juan Pardo in 1567. They established a fort and a mission in the native village of Guatari, believed to be located near the Yadkin River and inhabited by the Wateree. At the time, the area was ruled by a female chief whom the Spaniards called Guatari Mico (Mico was a term common among the Muskogee and Siouan speaking peoples of the south to mean "chief" or "leader"). The Spaniards called the village Salamanca in honor of the city of Salamanca in western Spain, and established a mission, headed by a secular priest named Sebastián Montero.

This fort was one of six that Pardo's expedition established before he returned separately to Spain in 1568. Small garrisons were stationed at each fort. They were built into the interior, including across the mountains in what is now southeastern Tennessee. In 1568, Native Americans at each fort massacred all but one soldier in the garrisons. The Spanish never returned to this interior area in other colonizing attempts, instead concentrating their efforts in Spanish Florida.

=== 18th century ===
English colonial settlement of North Carolina came decades later, starting in the coastal areas, where settlers migrated south from Virginia. Explorers and fur traders were the first to reach the Piedmont, paving the way for eventual settlers. Rowan County and St. Luke's Parish were established on March 27, 1753, from the upper part of Anson County. It was named for Matthew Rowan, acting governor of North Carolina from 1753 to 1754. It was intended to incorporate all of the lands of the Granville District that had previously been included in Anson County.

A house several miles west of present-day Salisbury in "the Irish settlement" served as the first courthouse starting June 15, 1753. Daniel Boone's father Squire Boone served as one of the first magistrates. By mid-1754 a new courthouse site was selected near "the place where the Old Waggon Road (crosses) over Grant's Creek."

As was typical of the time, Rowan County was originally a vast territory with an indefinite western boundary. As the population increased in the region, portions were taken to organize other counties and their seats. In 1770, the eastern portion was combined with the western part of Orange County to form Guilford County. In 1771 the northeastern portion of what was left became Surry County. In 1777 the western part of Rowan County was organized as Burke County. After the American Revolutionary War, in 1788, the western portion of the now much smaller Rowan County was organized as Iredell County.

=== 19th century ===
In 1822, Davidson County was formed from an eastern section. Finally, in 1836, that part of Rowan County north of the South Yadkin River became Davie County, and Rowan County took its present form and size. Since Rowan County was developed for tobacco, cotton cultivation, and mixed farming in the antebellum period, many of the plantation owners and some farmers were dependent on enslaved labor. Cotton and tobacco continued as a commodity crop after the war and into the 20th century. The population of Rowan County was 27.1 percent slaves in 1860.

During and following the Reconstruction era, the state legislature encouraged investment in railways, which had not occurred before. In addition, textile mills were built here and elsewhere in the Piedmont, bringing back cotton processing and manufacturing from centers in New York and New England. Urban populations increased.

=== 20th century ===
At the turn of the 20th century, after losing to Republican-Populist fusionist candidates, Democrats regained power and passed laws erecting barriers to voter registration to disenfranchise most Blacks. Together with the passage of Jim Crow laws, which suppressed Blacks socially, these measures ended the progress of African Americans in the state, after Republican men had already been serving in Congress. Charles Aycock and Robert Glenn, who were elected as state governors in 1900 and 1904, respectively, ran political campaigns to appeal to Whites. Six lynchings of African Americans were recorded in Rowan County from the late 19th into the early 20th centuries. This was the second-highest total of killings in the state, a number of extrajudicial murders that two other counties also had.

The racial terrorism of lynchings enforced White suppression of African Americans. In 1902, brothers James and Harrison Gillespie, aged 11 and 13, were lynched by a White mob for allegedly killing a young White woman working in a field. In August 1906, six African-American men were arrested as suspects in the murder of a farm family. That evening, a White mob stormed the county jail in Salisbury, freeing all the White prisoners, interrogating the Black ones, and taking out Jack Dillingham, Nease Gillespie, and his son John. The mob hanged the three men from a tree in a field, mutilated and tortured them, and shot them numerous times.

A center of textile manufacturing spanning from the late 19th to the late 20th century, the county has worked to attract new industries, after many textile manufacturing occupations moved offshore to lower wage markets during the late 20th century.

=== 21st century ===
In 2003, the county held the "250 Fest", celebrating its 250th anniversary.

== Geography ==
Interactive map of Rowan County

According to the U.S. Census Bureau, the county has a total area of 524 square miles (1,360 km^{2}), of which 523.95 square miles (1,357.0 km^{2}) is land and 12.32 square miles (31.9 km^{2}) (2.36%) is water.

The county's eastern border is formed by the Yadkin River. North of Ellis Crossroads, the South Yadkin River meets the Yadkin. The South Yadkin forms the county's northern border with Davie County. The southern border is an east–west line that bisects the city of Kannapolis.

=== State and local protected areas/sites ===
- Bell Tower Green
- Eagle Point Nature Preserve
- Gold Hill Mines Historic Park
- Lake Corriher Wilderness Park
- North Carolina Transportation Museum
- Second Creek Game Land
- Yadkin River Game Land (part)

=== Major water bodies ===
- Cold Water Creek
- Dutch Buffalo Creek
- High Rock Lake
- Irish Buffalo Creek
- Kannapolis Lake
- Lake Corriher
- Lake Fisher
- Lake Wright
- South Yadkin River
- Tuckertown Reservoir
- Yadkin River

=== Adjacent counties ===
- Cabarrus County – south
- Davidson County – east
- Davie County – north
- Iredell County – west
- Stanly County – southeast

=== Major highways ===
- I-85
- US 29
- US 52
- US 70
- US 601
- NC 8
- NC 49
- NC 150
- NC 152
- NC 153
- NC 801

Interstate 85 passes through the county from southwest to northeast. In the early 2000s, I-85 was widened in the central and northern part of the county, from exit 68, US 29 Connector, north almost to the Davidson County line. A new bridge over the Yadkin River was also built.

U.S. Route 70 enters the northwestern part of Rowan County, west of Cleveland. It runs southeast into Salisbury, where it follows Jake Alexander Boulevard to the southeast and joins US 29 North as Main Street. US 70 continues northeast as Main Street; it is called Salisbury Avenue in Spencer before crossing into Davidson County.

U.S. Route 29 forms Main Street in Kannapolis, China Grove, and Landis in the southern part of the county. It joins US 70 as Main Street through Salisbury, and as Salisbury Avenue in Spencer.

U.S. Route 52 is the main artery for the southeastern part of the county, serving the towns of Gold Hill, Rockwell, and Granite Quarry. Just before reaching downtown Salisbury, US-52 joins Interstate 85, which it follows into Davidson county.

=== Major infrastructure ===
- Mid-Carolina Regional Airport, near Salisbury
- Salisbury Station

== Demographics ==
Historical population
Census	Pop.	Note	%±
1790	15,972		—
1800	20,060		25.6%
1810	21,543		7.4%
1820	26,009		20.7%
1830	20,786		−20.1%
1840	12,109		−41.7%
1850	13,870		14.5%
1860	14,589		5.2%
1870	16,810		15.2%
1880	19,965		18.8%
1890	24,123		20.8%
1900	31,066		28.8%
1910	37,521		20.8%
1920	44,062		17.4%
1930	56,665		28.6%
1940	69,206		22.1%
1950	75,410		9.0%
1960	82,817		9.8%
1970	90,035		8.7%
1980	99,186		10.2%
1990	110,605		11.5%
2000	130,340		17.8%
2010	138,428		6.2%
2020	146,875		6.1%
2025 (est.)	155,096	▲	5.6%
U.S. Decennial Census; 1790–1960 1900–1990; 1990–2000 2010 2020

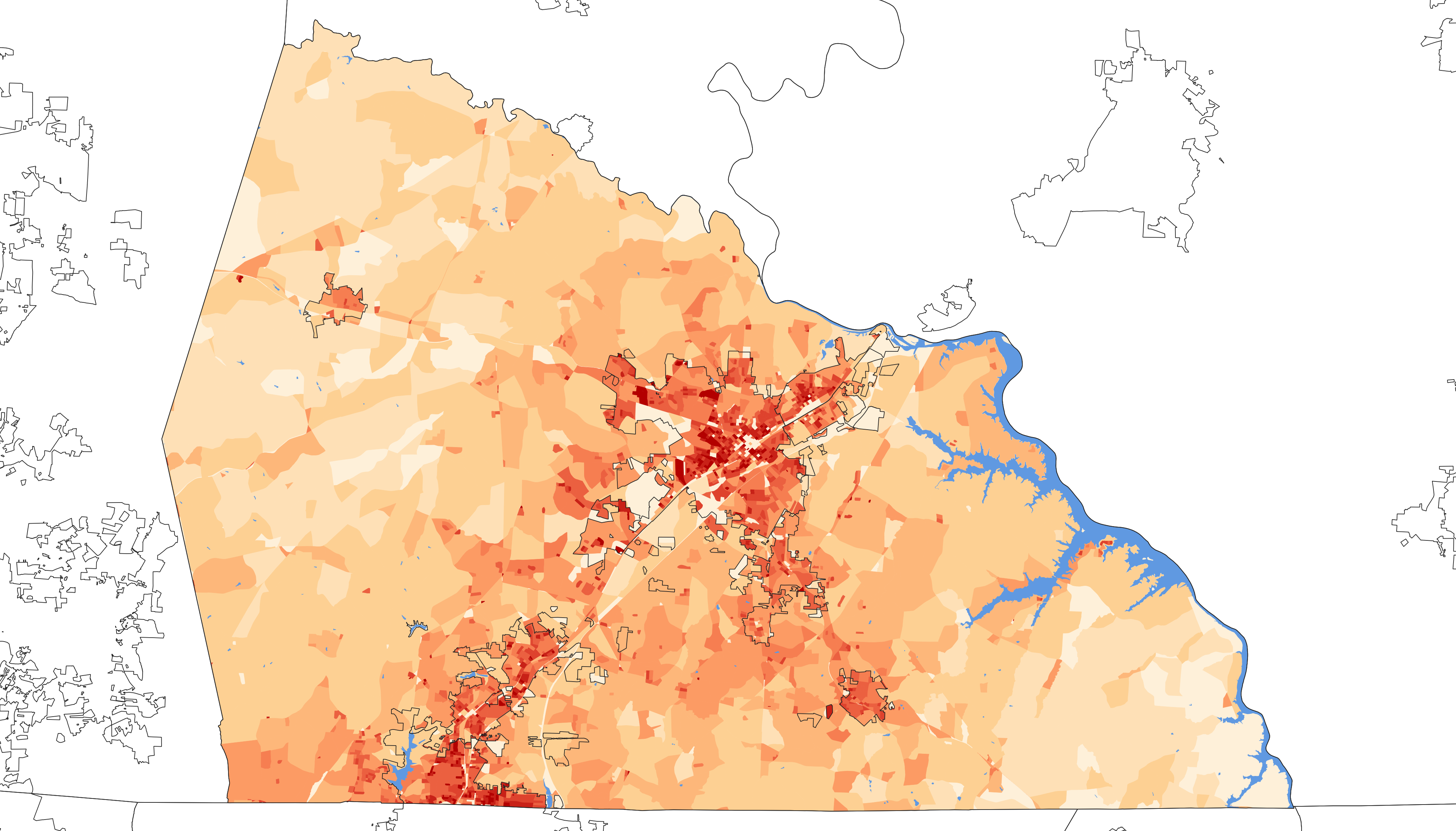
2020 population density of Rowan County, North Carolina, by census block

=== 2020 census ===
Rowan County, North Carolina – Racial and ethnic composition Note: the US Census treats Hispanic/Latino as an ethnic category. This table excludes Latinos from the racial categories and assigns them to a separate category. Hispanics/Latinos may be of any race.
Race / Ethnicity (NH = Non-Hispanic)	Pop. 1980	Pop. 1990	Pop. 2000	Pop. 2010	Pop. 2020	% 1980	% 1990	% 2000	% 2010	% 2020
White alone (NH)	82,707	91,521	101,859	101,986	100,135	83.39%	82.75%	78.15%	73.67%	68.18%
Black or African American alone (NH)	15,480	17,719	20,440	22,153	22,730	15.61%	16.02%	15.68%	16.00%	15.48%
Native American or Alaska Native alone (NH)	165	257	379	376	444	0.17%	0.23%	0.29%	0.27%	0.30%
Asian alone (NH)	213	441	1,086	1,353	1,505	0.21%	0.40%	0.83%	0.98%	1.02%
Native Hawaiian or Pacific Islander alone (NH)	x	x	15	44	71	x	x	0.01%	0.03%	0.05%
Other race alone (NH)	69	16	118	148	535	0.07%	0.01%	0.09%	0.11%	0.36%
Mixed race or Multiracial (NH)	x	x	1,074	1,724	5,515	x	x	0.82%	1.25%	3.75%
Hispanic or Latino (any race)	552	651	5,369	10,644	15,940	0.56%	0.59%	4.12%	7.69%	10.85%
Total	99,186	110,605	130,340	138,428	146,875	100.00%	100.00%	100.00%	100.00%	100.00%

As of the 2020 census, the county had a population of 146,875 and 57,433 households, of which 37,900 were families.

The median age was 41.4 years. 21.7% of residents were under the age of 18 and 18.3% of residents were 65 years of age or older. For every 100 females there were 97.8 males, and for every 100 females age 18 and over there were 95.6 males age 18 and over.

The racial makeup of the county was 69.9% White, 15.7% Black or African American, 0.5% American Indian and Alaska Native, 1.0% Asian, 0.1% Native Hawaiian and Pacific Islander, 6.1% from some other race, and 6.7% from two or more races. Hispanic or Latino residents of any race comprised 10.9% of the population.

57.8% of residents lived in urban areas, while 42.2% lived in rural areas.

There were 57,433 households in the county, of which 29.6% had children under the age of 18 living in them. Of all households, 46.9% were married-couple households, 18.7% were households with a male householder and no spouse or partner present, and 27.6% were households with a female householder and no spouse or partner present. About 27.2% of all households were made up of individuals and 12.4% had someone living alone who was 65 years of age or older.

There were 63,200 housing units, of which 9.1% were vacant. Among occupied housing units, 68.6% were owner-occupied and 31.4% were renter-occupied. The homeowner vacancy rate was 1.7% and the rental vacancy rate was 6.9%.

=== 2010 census ===
At the 2010 census, there were 138,428 people, 53,140 households, and 37,058 families residing in the county. The population density was 270.7 people per square mile (104.5 people/km^{2}). There were 60,211 housing units at an average density of 117.7 units per square mile (45.4 units/km^{2}). The racial makeup of the county was 76.52% White, 16.18% Black or African American, 0.34% Native American, 1.00% Asian, 0.035% Pacific Islander, 4.33% from other races, and 1.60% from two or more races. 7.69% of the population were Hispanic or Latino of any race.

Of the 53,140 households, 29.30% had children under the age of 18 living with them, 50.20% were married couples living together, 8.49% had a female householder with no husband present, 5.41% had a male householder with no wife and 30.26% were non-families. 25.22% of all households were made up of individuals, and 10.15% had someone living alone who was 65 years of age or older. The average household size was 2.52 and the average family size was 3.00.

In the county, the population was spread out, with 23.80% under the age of 18, 9.00% from 18 to 24, 25.40% from 25 to 44, 27.40% from 45 to 64, and 14.40% who were 65 years of age or older. The median age was 39.1 years. For every 100 females, there were 97.57 males. For every 100 females age 18 and over, there were 95.28 males.

=== 2000 census ===
According to the 2000 Census, The median income for a household in the county was $37,494, and the median income for a family was $44,242. Males had a median income of $31,626 versus $23,437 for females. The per capita income for the county was $18,071. About 8.10% of families and 10.60% of the population were below the poverty line, including 13.70% of those under age 18 and 11.40% of those age 65 or over.

== Law, government, and politics ==
The primary governing body of Rowan County is a council–manager government. The five-member board of commissioners are elected from single-member districts. As a group, they hire the county manager, who is responsible for operations. The current County Manager is Aaron Church. The current Commissioners are Greg Edds (chairman), Jim Greene (Vice-chairman), Judy Klusman, Mike Caskey, and Craig Pierce. Commissioners are elected to four-year terms, with three being elected during midterm national elections, and two being elected during presidential election years. The commission passes the Code of Ordinances for the county.

Rowan County is a member of the regional Centralina Council of Governments.

=== County commission prayer ===
In 2013 the American Civil Liberties Union filed suit on behalf of three Rowan county residents against the county commission's practice of starting their meeting with sectarian prayers by the commissioners, who instructed attendees to stand and join in. A federal district court issued an injunction forbidding the county commissioners from praying at their meetings. After a divided panel of the United States Court of Appeals for the Fourth Circuit found that the prayers did not violate the Establishment Clause of the United States Constitution, the full court sitting en banc disagreed and affirmed the injunction. The Supreme Court of the United States declined to review, over the written dissent of two justices. In 2019, the county was forced to pay $285,000 to the ACLU for the plaintiffs' legal fees because it had lost the lawsuit.

=== Law enforcement and judicial system ===
Rowan County lies within the bounds of North Carolina's 27th Prosecutorial District, the 19C Superior Court District, and the 19C District Court District. The Rowan County Sheriff's Office was founded in 1753 when Rowan County was created from Anson County. Its duties include courthouse security, civil process, operation of detention facility, investigations and community patrol. It has over 200 employees, most of which are sworn deputies. The current Sheriff of Rowan County is Kevin L. Auten, who was appointed after the retirement of George Wilhelm in 2009. Auten won election to a full term in his own right in 2010.

The Rowan County Sheriff's Office won the J. Stannard Baker Award, a national award for outstanding achievement in highway safety, in 2003.

List of past sheriffs
- 1753–1754 Unknown
- 1754–1758 David Jones
- 1758–1759 Edward Hughes
- 1759–1763 Benjamin Miller (Milner)
- 1763–1764 William Nassery
- 1764–1767 Francis Locke
- 1767–1768 Griffith Rutherford
- 1768–1769 Andrew Allison
- 1769–1769 Adam Allison (August 11 – November 16)
- 1770–1770 No Sheriff
- 1771–1771 William Temple Coles
- 1771–1772 James McKay
- 1772–1774 Daniel Little, Esq.
- 1774–1777 James Kerr
- 1777–1779 Galbraith Falls
- 1779–1779 George Henry Berger (February 2, 1779–May 5, 1779)
- 1779–1779 Samuel Hughey (May 6 – November 3)
- 1779–1780 Josiah Rounsevall, Esq. (November 3 – May 3)
- 1780–1780 Moses Winslow, Esq. (May 3 – August 9)
- 1780–1781 William Brandon, Esq. (August 9 – May 9)
- 1781–1781 Peter Faust (May 9 – August 7)
- 1781–1782 James Craige
- 1782–1785 John Brevard Jr.
- 1785–1786 John Brevard Sr.
- 1786–1787 Hugh Terrence (Torrence, Torrance, Tarrants) (Note: Later became first sheriff of Iredell County, North Carolina.)
- 1787–1790 Lewis Beard
- 1790–1792 Isaac Jones
- 1792–1794 John Braly (Brawley) Jr.
- 1794–1808 John Troy
- 1808–1813 Edward Chambers
- 1813–1814 John Smith, Esq.
- 1814–1818 Alexander Frohock
- 1818–1820 John Beard, Esq.
- 1820–1824 Samuel Jones
- 1824–1826 Charles Fisher
- 1826–1828 Isaac D. Jones
- 1828–1837 Fielding Slater
- 1837–1841 John H. Hardie
- 1841–1849 Richard W. Long
- 1849–1858 Caleb Kluttz
- 1858–1865 W. A. Walton
- 1865–1866 Solomon Kluttz
- 1867–1872 W. A. Walton
- 1872–1880 C. F. Waggoner
- 1880–1890 Charles C. Krider
- 1890–1900 J. M. Monroe
- 1900–1906 D. R. Julian
- 1906–1908 Hodge Krider (father of J. H. Krider)
- 1908–1914 J. H. McKenzie
- 1914–1928 J. H. Krider
- 1928–1930 R. P. Lyerly
- 1930–1931 W. Locke McKenzie
- 1931–1932 Cal Miller
- 1932–1950 J. H. Krider
- 1950–1966 Arthur J. Shuping
- 1966–1986 John Stirewalt
- 1986–1986 Junius L. Bost (February – December)
- 1986–1998 Robert G. Martin
- 1998–2009 George A. Wilhelm
- 2010–pres. Kevin L. Auten (served as acting head while chief deputy from the time former sheriff Wilhelm resigned until Auten was appointed as sheriff in 2010)

United States presidential election results for Rowan County, North Carolina
Year	Republican		Democratic		Third party(ies)	
Year	No.	%	No.	%	No.	%
1880	1,377	40.36%	2,035	59.64%	0	0.00%
1884	1,372	34.18%	2,642	65.82%	0	0.00%
1888	1,274	31.35%	2,732	67.22%	58	1.43%
1892	876	21.84%	2,303	57.42%	832	20.74%
1896	1,468	31.91%	3,095	67.28%	37	0.80%
1900	1,555	36.25%	2,460	57.34%	275	6.41%
1904	1,215	33.21%	2,424	66.25%	20	0.55%
1908	2,009	45.02%	2,392	53.61%	61	1.37%
1912	280	6.06%	2,748	59.43%	1,596	34.52%
1916	2,320	43.18%	3,053	56.82%	0	0.00%
1920	4,888	43.22%	6,421	56.78%	0	0.00%
1924	3,560	39.06%	4,816	52.84%	738	8.10%
1928	7,957	62.46%	4,783	37.54%	0	0.00%
1932	4,464	30.94%	9,782	67.81%	180	1.25%
1936	4,306	25.16%	12,808	74.84%	0	0.00%
1940	4,059	23.76%	13,023	76.24%	0	0.00%
1944	5,862	37.62%	9,721	62.38%	0	0.00%
1948	5,722	36.44%	6,799	43.30%	3,181	20.26%
1952	17,535	60.82%	11,296	39.18%	0	0.00%
1956	17,562	64.28%	9,761	35.72%	0	0.00%
1960	17,726	57.84%	12,919	42.16%	0	0.00%
1964	14,804	49.78%	14,934	50.22%	0	0.00%
1968	15,207	46.79%	8,074	24.84%	9,220	28.37%
1972	20,735	73.34%	6,834	24.17%	705	2.49%
1976	14,644	48.44%	15,363	50.82%	222	0.73%
1980	18,566	59.68%	11,671	37.52%	872	2.80%
1984	25,207	70.20%	10,643	29.64%	57	0.16%
1988	23,192	65.48%	12,127	34.24%	97	0.27%
1992	21,297	49.84%	14,308	33.48%	7,127	16.68%
1996	22,754	57.94%	13,461	34.28%	3,058	7.79%
2000	28,922	65.53%	14,891	33.74%	320	0.73%
2004	34,915	67.32%	16,735	32.27%	217	0.42%
2008	37,451	60.84%	23,391	38.00%	718	1.17%
2012	38,775	62.23%	22,650	36.35%	887	1.42%
2016	42,810	66.51%	19,400	30.14%	2,159	3.35%
2020	49,297	67.15%	23,114	31.49%	997	1.36%
2024	50,807	67.39%	23,788	31.55%	799	1.06%

== Education ==
=== Colleges ===
- Catawba College, founded in 1851
- Livingstone College, founded in 1879
- Rowan-Cabarrus Community College. (Otherwise known as RCCC), founded in 1963
- Hood Theological Seminary, founded in 1885, became independent in 2001
- Campbell University, teaching hospital at Novant Health, Rowan Medical Center, started in 2014

=== Rowan–Salisbury School System ===
The Rowan–Salisbury School System is a PK-12 graded school district covering nearly all of Rowan County. The 35 schools in the district serve 20,887 students as of 2009–2010. It was formed in 1989 with the merger of Rowan County Schools and Salisbury City Schools.

=== Kannapolis City Schools ===
Students living in the portion of Kannapolis located in Rowan County (the city is mostly in Cabarrus County) attend Kannapolis city schools. Their public school system operates independently of the countywide school systems.

=== Private schools ===
- North Hills Christian School – (pre-school through high school)
- Rockwell Christian School (pre-school through high school)
- Sacred Heart Catholic School – (elementary through middle school)
- Salisbury Academy – (pre-kindergarten through middle school)
- Salisbury Adventist School

=== Libraries ===
- Rowan Public Library
  - Headquarters (Salisbury)
  - East Branch (Rockwell)
  - Frank T. Tadlock South Rowan Regional Library (China Grove)
  - West Branch (Cleveland)

== Media ==
The Salisbury Post, founded in 1905, is a local newspaper that is published several days a week.

== Communities ==
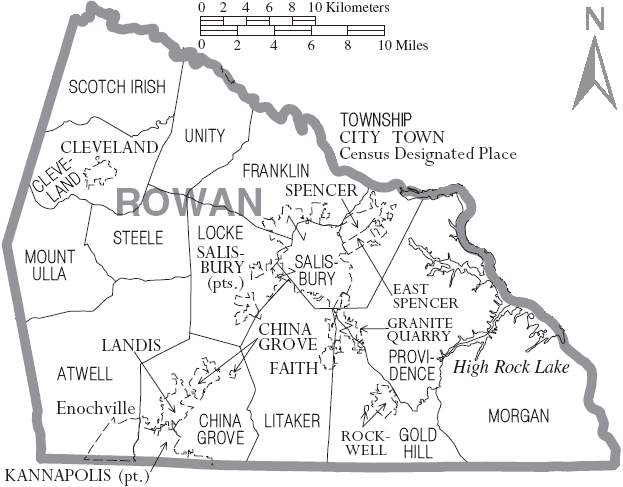
Map of Rowan County with municipal and township labels

=== Cities ===
- Kannapolis (mostly in Cabarrus County; incorporated in 1984)
- Salisbury (county seat and largest community; founded in 1753; post office opened June 12, 1792; first postmaster was George Lauman)

=== Towns ===
- China Grove (post office first established on November 27, 1823, with Noah Partee as postmaster; was changed to Luthersville 1846–1849 then back to China Grove until 1855; second post office established December 31, 1855 as Eufaula with Philip A. Correll first postmaster; renamed to China Grove on August 15, 1859, with John A. Hess first postmaster)
- Cleveland (first postmaster William L. Allison, March 3, 1887; was Third Creek 1884–1887, first postmaster William L. Allison; was Rowan Mills 1856–1884, Osborn G. Foard first postmaster; was Cowansville 1831–1856, first postmaster John Cowan)
- East Spencer (first postmaster William J. Hatley, February 12, 1913)
- Faith (first post office open from January 24, 1889, to July 16, 1906, with John W. Frick first postmaster; reestablished February 26, 1932, with Lawson J. McCombs first postmaster))
- Granite Quarry (founded in the 1800s; post office first opened on August 7, 1891, as Woodside with John F. Wiley first postmaster; renamed to Granite Quarry on January 15, 1902; first postmaster was William S. Brown)
- Landis (first postmaster was Joel Corriher, July 17, 1902)
- Rockwell (first postmaster was Peter Miller, March 1, 1872)
- Spencer (founded in 1896; first postmaster Hugh Smith, May 15, 1897)

=== Census-designated places ===
- Enochville (chartered town from 1874 to 1977; post office open from August 31, 1877 to 15 March 1907; Aaron Yost first postmaster)
- Gold Hill (post office established on May 15, 1844, Robert E. Rives first postmaster)

=== Unincorporated communities ===
- Barber (also known as Barber Junction; post office opened May 11, 1900; first postmaster John T. Barber)
- Bear Poplar (post office from September 12, 1878, to February 11, 1966, Lucy J. Kistler first postmistress)
- Bostian Heights (formerly Bostians, Post office: August 6, 1875, to July 16, 1877, Sophia L. Bostian as first postmistress)
- Correll Park
- Craven (post office from October 30, 1882, to October 15, 1915; first postmaster Allen H. Newsome)
- Crescent (post office from March 5, 1898, to May 29, 1925, J. M. L. Lyerly first postmaster)
- Dukeville
- Ellis Crossroads
- Five Forks
- Five Points
- Franklin
- Liberty
- Mill Bridge (post office from July 23, 1874, to September 30, 1903, Mary E. McCubbin first postmistress)
- Morgan Ford
- Mount Ulla (formerly Wood Grove, post office from April 12, 1830, to April 22, 1843, first postmaster Julius J. Reeves; Mount Ulla post office from April 22, 1843, to October 24, 1899 (spelled Mountulla in 1894), first postmaster James Cowan; known as Rowan from October 24 to November 22, 1899; Mount Ulla post office re-established on November 22, 1899, with Adam E. Sherrill postmaster)
- Mount Vernon (post office from May 27, 1822, to February 29, 1904; first postmaster Jacob Krider)
- Needmore
- Pittsburg
- Pooletown (first known as Pool; post office from February 6, 1872, to September 15, 1906; first postmaster John F. Hodges)
- Shupings Mill
- Trading Ford (post office from April 4, 1890, to January 15, 1906; first postmaster George W. Long)
- Watson Village (formerly known as Watsonville; post office from July 20, 1874, to June 30, 1903; first postmaster William F. Watson)
- Westcliff
- Woodbine
- Woodbridge Run
- Woodleaf (first known as Wood Leaf; postmaster was Daniel Wood, September 4, 1855)
- Yadkin

=== Townships ===
By the requirements of the North Carolina Constitution of 1868, the county was divided into townships. Previous to that time, the subdivisions were Captain's Districts. While the Captain's Districts referred primarily to the militia, it served also for the election precinct, the tax listing and tax collecting district. The following townships in Rowan County were created in 1868:

- Atwell
- China Grove
- Cleveland
- Franklin
- Gold Hill
- Litaker
- Locke
- Morgan
- Mount Ulla
- Providence
- Salisbury
- Scotch Irish
- Steele
- Unity

== Notable people ==
- Tommy Barnhardt (born 1963), NFL player, played at UNC
- William Lee Davidson (1746–1781), American Revolutionary War colonel
- Joseph Dickson (1745–1825), American Revolutionary War Colonel and Congressman
- John Willis Ellis (1820–1861), former governor of North Carolina from 1859 to 1861, born in what was then eastern Rowan County and practiced law in Salisbury
- Jackie Fargo (1930–2013), professional wrestler
- James Allen Graham (1921–2003), former North Carolina Commissioner of Agriculture
- Phil Kirk (born 1944), former chairman of the North Carolina State Board of Education
- Francis Locke (1722–1796), plantation owner in Rowan, noted for his victory at the Battle of Ramseur's Mill during the American Revolutionary War
- Francis Locke, Jr. (1766–1823), Congressman
- Matthew Locke (1730–1801), Congressman and Brigadier General in the American Revolution
- W. Eugene McCombs (1925–2004), politician and former Rowan County Commissioner
- Lee Slater Overman (1854–1930), U.S. Senator for North Carolina
- Joseph Pearson (1776–1834), Congressman
- Griffith Rutherford (1721–1805), military officer and Revolutionary War general, commander of the Salisbury District Brigade

== See also ==
- Carter County, Tennessee, governed by Rowan County from 1753 to 1775
- List of counties in North Carolina
- National Register of Historic Places listings in Rowan County, North Carolina
- Rowan County Regiment
