= Wilmington District Brigade =

- Active: 1776-1783
- Allegiance: (United States) North Carolina
- Branch: North Carolina militia
- Type: infantry brigade
- Engagements: see § Engagements

Commanders
- Notable commanders: 1. Brigadier General John Ashe, Sr.; 2. Brigadier General John Alexander Lillington; 3. Brigadier General James Kenan (Pro Tempore)

The Wilmington District Brigade was an administrative division of the North Carolina militia during the American Revolutionary War (1776–1783). This unit was established by the North Carolina Provincial Congress on May 4, 1776, and disbanded at the end of the war.

== Leadership ==
Colonel John Ashe, Sr. was the first commander of the New Hannover County Regiment in 1775. He commanded the Wilmington District brigade from 1776 to 1778 when he was promoted on May 4, 1776 to Major General over all North Carolina militia and state troops until 1779.

- Brigadier General John Ashe, Sr. (1776-1778)
- Brigadier General John Alexander Lillington (1779-1783)
- Brigadier General (Pro Tempore) James Kenan (1781)

== Regiments ==
The following are the North Carolina militia regiments and subordination of the Wilmington District Brigade, along with the dates established and disestablished.

Unit	Subordinate Brigade	Created	Disbanded	Original Commander, Rank
North Carolina Militia and State Troops	Governor	1778	1783	Ashe, John Sr., M.G. (1778–1779)
Wilmington District Brigade	North Carolina Militia	1776	1783	Ashe, John Sr., B.G. (1776–1778)
1st Battalion of Militia	Wilmington	1776	1776	Brown, Thomas, Col (1776)
2nd Battalion of Militia	Wilmington	1776	1776	Hawkins, Philemon, Jr., Col (declined to serve), Col Peter Dozier (1776)
Bladen County Regiment	Salisbury	1775	1783	Robeson, Thomas, Jr., Col (1775–1789, 1781)
Brunswick County Regiment	Wilmington	1775	1783	Howe, Robert, Col (1775)
Cumberland County Regiment	Wilmington	1775	1783	Rutherford, Thomas, Col (1775–1776)
Duplin County Regiment	Wilmington	1775	1783	Kenan, James, Col (1775–1783)
New Hanover County Regiment	Wilmington	1775	1783	Moore, James, Col (1775)
Onslow County Regiment	Wilmington	1775	1783	Cray, William, Col (1775–1778)

=== 1st and 2nd Battalions of Militia ===
The 1st and 2nd Battalions of Militia were hastily established on May 7, 1776 because of the threat of British fleet off the coast of North Carolina at Cape Fear in March 1776. The British did not come ashore in any large number and intended to go to Charleston, South Carolina, instead. The Battalions were marched to Wilmington but saw no action. They saw no action and were disbanded on August 13, 1776. The troops were sent home.

The 1st Battalion of Militia was commanded by Colonel Thomas Brown. The 2nd Battalion of Militia was commanded by Col. Peter Dauge. Col. Philemon Hawkins, Jr. had initially been appointed as commander of the 2nd Battalion but he declined the commission.

=== Bladen County Regiment ===
The Bladen County Regiment established in Bladen County on July 16, 1775. It was authorized on September 9, 1775 by the Province of North Carolina Congress and commanded by Col. Thomas Robeson, Jr. (1775–1779, 1781), Col. Thomas Brown (1778–1782), and Col. Thomas Owen (1776–1783, 2nd colonel). The regiment was engaged in 16 known battles and skirmishes between 1776 and 1781. It was disbanded at the end of the war in 1783.

=== Brunswick County Regiment ===
The Brunswick County Regiment was subordinated to the Wilmington District Brigade. It was established in March 1775. The first commander of the regiment was Colonel Robert Howe.

=== Cumberland County Regiment ===
The Cumberland County Regiment was subordinate to the Wilmington District Brigade. The regiment was established on September 9, 1775. The first commander was Colonel Thomas Rutherford.

=== Duplin County Regiment ===
The Duplin County Regiment was subordinate to the Wilmington District Brigade. The regiment was established on September 9, 1775. The first commander was Colonel James Kenan.

=== New Hanover County Regiment ===
The New Hannover County Regiment was subordinated to the Wilmington District Brigade. The regiment was established in March 1775. The initial commander was Colonel James Moore.

=== Onslow County Regiment ===
The Onslow County Regiment was subordinate to the Wilmington Districgt Brigade. It was established on September 9, 1775. The first commander of the regiment was Colonel William Cray.

== Engagements ==
Regiments of the Wilmington District Brigade were involved in 49 known engagements (battles, sieges, and skirmishes), including one in Georgia, 9 in South Carolina, 39 in North Carolina. The 1st and 2nd Battalion of Militia did not see any action. One or more companies of these regiments were involved in each engagement.

Order	Date	Battle	State	Bladen	Brunswick	Cumberland	Duplin	New Hanover	Onslow
1	7/18/1775	Battle of Fort Johnston #1	NC		x				
2	11/16/1775 to 11/21/1775	Battle of Fort Johnston #2	NC		x				
3	1/27/1776 to 1/28/1776	Battle of Fort Johnston #3	NC					x	
4	2/10/1776	Battle of Cape Fear River	NC		x				
5	2/27/1776	Battle of Moore's Creek Bridge	NC	x	x	x	x		x
6	3/8/1776 to 3/12/1776	Battle of Fort Johnston #4	NC		x				
7	4/6/1776	Battle of Brunswick Town #1	NC		x				
8	5/1/1776 to 5/3/1776	Battle of Fort Johnston #5	NC		x				
9	5/17/1776	Battle of Brunswick Town #2	NC		x				
10	5/23/1776	Battle of Fort Johnston #6	NC		x				
11	6/28/1776	Battle of Fort Moultrie #1	SC	x					
12	3/3/1779	Battle of Briar Creek	GA	x		x	x	x	x
13	6/20/1779	Battle of Stono Ferry	SC	x		x	x		x
14	1/30/1780	Battle of Heron's Bridge	NC	x	x		x	x	x
15	3/28/1780 to 5/12/1780	Siege of Charleston 1780	SC	x		x	x	x	x
16	3/29/1780 to 3/30/1780	Battle of Gibbes' Plantation	SC				x		
17	8/11/1780	Battle of Little Lynches Creek	SC	x				x	
18	8/16/1780	Battle of Camden	SC	x	x	x		x	x
19	10/14/1780	Battle of Shallow Ford	NC	x					
20	10/1/1780 to 10/30/1780	Battle of Myhand's Bridge #1	NC				x		
21	10/7/1780	Battle of Kings Mountain	SC						x
22	10/30/1780	Battle of Bear Swamp	SC	x					
23	1/28/1781	Battle of Wilmington #1	NC					x	
24	2/1/1781 to 2/28/1781	Battle of Bacon's Inlet	NC		x				
25	3/1/1781	Battle of Cole's Bridge	NC				x		
26	3/1/1781 to 3/31/1780	Battle of Rouse's Tavern	NC					x	
27	3/15/1781	Battle of Guilford Court House	NC	x		x	x		
28	3/27/1781	Battle of Barbeque Church	NC			x			
29	5/11/1781	Battle of Cohera Swamp	NC				x		
30	5/13/1781	Battle of Legat's Bridge	NC			x			
31	5/13/1781	Battle of Myhand's Bridge #2	NC				x		
32	5/16/1781	Battle of Portevent's Mill	NC				x		
33	7/1/1781 to 7/31/1781	Battle of Ray's Mill Creek	NC			x			
34	7/4/1781	Battle of Wilmington #2	NC					x	
35	7/26/1781	Battle of Stewart's Creek #2	NC	x		x			
36	7/29/1781	Battle of House in the Horseshoe	NC			x			
37	8/2/1781	Battle of Rockfish Creek	NC	x			x		
38	8/4/1781	Battle of Beatti's Bridge	NC	x					
39	8/14/1781	Battle of Cumberland County Court House	NC			x			
40	8/19/1781	Battle of New Bern	NC						x
41	8/27/1781	Battle of Tory Hole	NC	x			x		
42	9/1/1781	Battle of Little Raft Swamp	NC	x					
43	9/1/1781 to 9/30/1781	Battle of Brown Marsh	NC	x	x		x		
44	9/1/1781 to 9/30/1781	Battle of Hood's Creek	NC	x	x				
45	9/8/1781	Battle of Eutaw Springs	SC				x		
46	9/13/1781	Battle of Lindley's Mill	NC			x		x	
47	10/15/1781	Battle of Raft Swamp	NC	x					
48	11/18/1781	Evacuation of Wilmington	NC	x			x	x	
49	12/1/1781 to 12/31/1781	Battle of Big Juniper Creek	NC			x			

== See also ==
- List of North Carolina militia units in the American Revolution
- Wilmington, North Carolina
