= Joseph Taylor (colonel) =

American military officer and politician

Col. Joseph Taylor Sr.

State Senator to the North Carolina Senate for Granville County
- In office 1781–1803

Personal details
- Born: February 19, 1742 Orange County, Province of Virginia, Colonial North America
- Died: May 31, 1815 (aged 73) Granville County, North Carolina, United States
- Party: Patriot (American Revolution), Democratic-Republican
- Spouse: Frances Anderson (1746–1817)
- Children: 5
- Parent: John Powell Taylor
- Occupation: Politician; Farmer; Military Officer

Military service
- Years of service: 1775–1783
- Rank: Colonel
- Commands: Granville County Militia
- Battles/wars: American Revolutionary War; Battle of Moore's Creek Bridge; Battle of Guilford Court House

Joseph Taylor Sr. (February 19, 1742 – May 31, 1815) was a Virginia-born American colonel of militia and North Carolina state senator who served in the American Revolutionary War at the Battle of Moore's Creek Bridge and the Battle of Guilford Court House, where he commanded the Granville County Regiment of Militia.

== Early life ==
Joseph Taylor Sr. was born in 1742 to John Powell Taylor and Catherine Pendleton. He married Frances Anderson in 1763 at the age of 21, and they had five children together.

== Military and political career ==
He commanded the Granville County Militia during the American Revolutionary War, serving as their commander at the Battles of Moore's Creek and Guilford Court House. Starting during the later years of the American Revolutionary War, and on through into the early nineteenth century, he served as a State Senator for Granville County, North Carolina. During his tenure he oversaw many of the State's early sessions and enactment of foundational laws and actions, including the foundation of the University of North Carolina, the Cession of Western lands to areas that later became the state of Tennessee, the establishment of the Federal Election System, and the formation of the modern county set up of North Carolina.

== Later life and legacy ==
Joseph Taylor Sr. died in 1815 at age 73. His descendants and relatives in Granville County, North Carolina, have several plantation sites still standing today, including the Archibald Taylor Plantation House and the Col. Richard P. Taylor House. His 3rd great-granddaughter is Elizabeth Taylor.
