= James Gillespie (North Carolina politician) =

American politician (1747–1805)

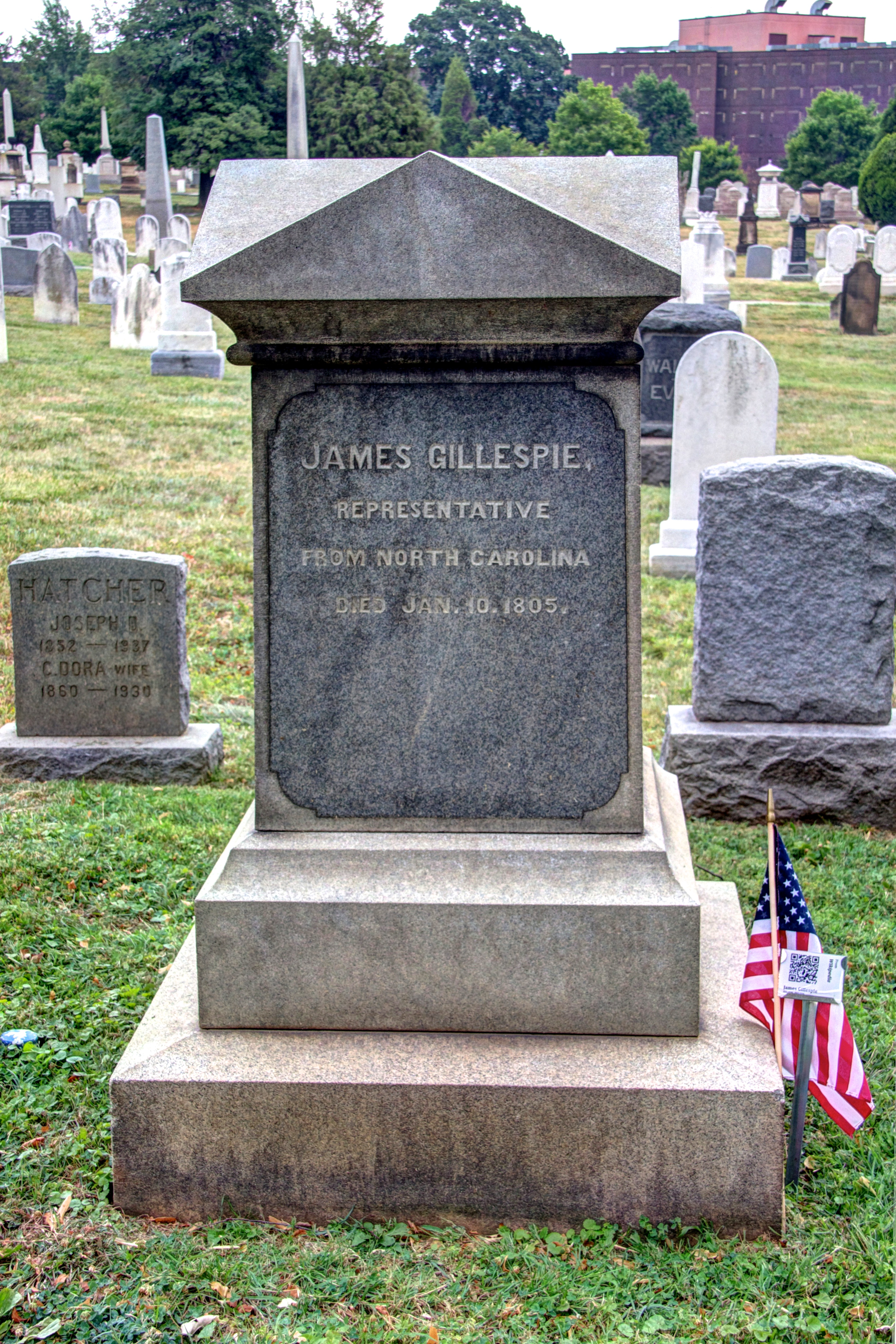
- James Gillespie's grave.

Member of the U.S. House of Representatives from North Carolina
- In office November 10, 1803 (Note: The 8th Congress officially began on October 17, 1803. He was sworn in on November 10, 1803.) – January 10, 1805
- Preceded by: Nathaniel Macon
- Succeeded by: Thomas S. Kenan
- Constituency: 5th district
- In office January 6, 1794 (Note: The 3rd Congress officially began on December 2, 1793. He was sworn in on January 6, 1794.) – March 3, 1799
- Preceded by: District created
- Succeeded by: William H. Hill
- Constituency: 6th district
Additional positions
Member of the North Carolina Senate from Duplin County
In office November 15, 1792 – January 1, 1793
Preceded by	James Kenan
Succeeded by	James Kenan
In office November 2, 1789 – December 22, 1789
Preceded by	James Kenan
Succeeded by	James Kenan
In office October 25, 1784 – 1786
Preceded by	Robert Clinton
Succeeded by	James Kenan
Member of the North Carolina House of Commons from Duplin County
In office April 15, 1782 – June 3, 1784 Serving with David Dodd, Richard Clinton, and Thomas Gray
Preceded by	Thomas Hicks; John Moulton
Succeeded by	Robert Dickson
In office May 1779 – September 1780 Serving with Richard Clinton and Joseph Dickson
Preceded by	Thomas Hicks
Succeeded by	Thomas Hicks; John Moulton
Delegate to the 5th North Carolina Provincial Congress from Duplin County
In office November 12, 1776 – December 23, 1776

Personal details
- Born: 1747 County Monaghan, Ireland
- Died: January 10, 1805 (aged 57–58) Washington, D.C., U.S.
- Resting place: Congressional Cemetery, Washington, D.C., U.S.
- Party: Anti-Administration (1793–1795); Democratic-Republican (1795–1805)
- Spouse: Dorcas Mumford (m. 1770; died 1801)
- Children: 7; including David
- Education: University of Dublin
- Occupation: Planter; lawyer; military officer; statesman

Military service
- Branch/service: North Carolina militia
- Years of service: 1776–1782
- Rank: Colonel
- Unit: 1st Battalion of Volunteers (1776–1777); Duplin County Regiment (1780–1782)
- Battles/wars: Revolutionary War; Battle of Moore's Creek Bridge; Battle of Heron's Bridge; Battle of Rockfish Creek; Battle of Elizabethtown

James Gillespie (1747 – January 10, 1805) was an American lawyer, politician, and Revolutionary War veteran from North Carolina. Born in Ireland, he was first elected to the United States House of Representatives in 1793 and died in office on January 10, 1805. Prior to serving in the U.S. Congress, Gillespie was a member of the North Carolina House of Commons, the North Carolina Senate, the North Carolina Council of State, and held various other positions in the state government. He voted twice against the ratification of the U.S. Constitution and advocated for a bill of rights.

== Biography ==
=== Early life ===
The Biographical Directory of the United States Congress incorrectly gives his birthplace as Kenansville, North Carolina, which did not exist at the time of his birth. Several sources, including William S. Powell's Dictionary of North Carolina Biography, family sources, the National Archives and Records Administration, and North Carolina state publications mention he was born in Ireland in County Monaghan. James Gillespie was one of five children born to David Gillespie and Mrs. (née Brison) Gillespie. He pursued classical studies at the University of Dublin and immigrated to New Bern, North Carolina, from Ireland with two of his brothers, Archibald and Borthick Gillespie. Borthick would later return to Ireland. His brother Archibald was a prominent citizen of Onslow County and was issued a commission of the peace and dedimus by the governor in 1777. Some allegations of misconduct were placed against Archibald when he was a Justice of the Peace of Onslow County, but they were found to be groundless.

James Gillespie purchased a plantation known as "Golden Grove" located one mile east of Kenansville before the start of the Revolutionary War. The area in which he lived was known as the village of Grove and he was a member of the Grove Presbyterian Church which still maintains an active congregation.

=== Revolutionary War and political career ===
Around the beginning of the American Revolutionary War, James Gillespie was a lieutenant of captain Abraham Moulton, who participated at the Battle of Moore's Creek Bridge under colonel James Kenan and was the father of politicians John Moulton and Michael Moulton. Gillespie is believed to have participated in the battle. After the Battle of Moore's Creek Bridge, Gillespie was a captain of a company of Duplin County volunteers and joined Abraham Sheppard on a tour of duty in South Carolina.

He was a delegate to the 5th North Carolina Provincial Congress in Halifax that drafted the state constitution.

Gillespie was appointed as captain of the 1st Battalion of Volunteers and the Duplin County Regiment of the North Carolina militia. Gillespie also served in the North Carolina House of Commons (1779–1783) from Duplin County, then in the North Carolina Senate (1784–1786, 1789, 1792). He fought and was a participant in the battles of Heron's Bridge, Rockfish Creek, and Elizabethtown as a member of the militia. During the war, his home was burnt down by Tories led by Major James Henry Craig. He advanced to the rank of colonel in the militia. In 1785, Gillespie was appointed as a trustee of Grove Academy by the legislature.

He voted against the ratification of the U.S. Constitution at the first convention in Hillsborough on August 1, 1788. He attended the second convention in Fayetteville in November 1789, elected as a delegate from Duplin County. He voted against the successful ratification on the second vote on November 21, 1789, advocating with others for a Bill of Rights.

Gillespie held various positions in the state government of North Carolina, serving as commissioner of confiscated property, secretary to the governor, superintendent of the press, and on the Council of State. He defeated James Kenan in a North Carolina Senate election in 1791. Gillespie was first elected to the U.S. Congress in 1793. He opposed the Jay Treaty signed in 1794 by George Washington with Great Britain. In 1800, Gillespie broke his hip while in Washington, D.C. He died while in office serving as a U.S. congressman on January 10, 1805. He was buried at the Presbyterian Burying Ground in Georgetown, D.C. By an act of Congress, his remains were removed to the Congressional Cemetery in April 1892. A cenotaph at the cemetery is located at Range 31, Site 58; his ashes were transferred to the cemetery and now lie under the marble monument.

== Political and social views ==
The Biographical Directory of the United States Congress mentions that Gillespie was elected as a candidate to the 3rd U.S. Congress (March 4, 1793 – March 3, 1795) and represented the Anti-Administration party. He later became a Democratic-Republican before being elected as a Democratic-Republican to the 4th and 5th U.S. Congresses (March 4, 1795 – March 3, 1799) and later to the 8th U.S. Congress (March 4, 1803 – January 10, 1805).

Powell's Dictionary of North Carolina Biography mentions Gillespie was a Federalist during his time as congressman.

Gillespie was a slave owner. In the 1790 census he is listed as owning over 2,000 acres and 30 slaves. His family owned a large amount of land in the lower Cape Fear region of North Carolina in Duplin County.

== Personal life ==
James Gillespie married Dorcas Mumford of Onslow County, and they had at least 7 children. His son David fought in the War of 1812, was a member of the House of Commons from Bladen County, and was also a councilor of state. David was the first person to receive a document in the form of a diploma by the University of North Carolina before he assisted Andrew Ellicott as a surveyor for the United States boundary commission.

On April 24, 1788, James Gillespie, along with James Kenan, and Joseph Dickson, were appointed guardians of the orphaned children of James Love. Kenan Love, the oldest orphan, was allowed to choose his own guardian and chose George Morrisay. James Love commanded a company of patriots from Duplin County in the Battle of Moore's Creek Bridge. He and a group of patriots were "taken by surprise and brutally murdered by the British at Alexander Rouse's tavern near the little bridge a few miles above Wilmington."

== Legacy ==
Two letters from Gillespie to the Governor Richard Caswell have been published as part of the digital publishing initiative Documenting the American South at the University of North Carolina at Chapel Hill University Libraries. The earlier letter dates to the Revolutionary War in 1777, when Gillespie wrote to the Governor requesting for a William Gillespie to be freed from his confinement at Cross Creek in present-day Fayetteville.

Two additional letters written by Gillespie to James Madison during Madison's term as the 5th U.S. Secretary of State have been published on the National Archives and Records Administration website.

Gillespie took part in the meetings to merge Cross Creek and Campbellton into Fayetteville, which named a street, Gillespie Street, in his honor.

A historical marker in Kenansville was dedicated to Gillespie on July 6, 2018, in an event titled "Honoring the Life of a Noteworthy Patriot", organized by his descendants, the Duplin County Historical Society, and the Daughters of the American Revolution. The historical marker is located next to the Routledge Cemetery in Kenansville.

== See also ==
- List of members of the United States Congress who died in office (1790–1899)

== Note ==
U.S. House of Representatives
Preceded by Nathaniel Macon	Member of the U.S. House of Representatives from North Carolina's 5th congressional district 1803–1805	Succeeded by Thomas Kenan
Preceded by District created	Member of the U.S. House of Representatives from North Carolina's 6th congressional district 1793–1799	Succeeded by William H. Hill
North Carolina Senate
Preceded by Robert Clinton	Member of the North Carolina Senate from Duplin County; 1784–1786, 1789, 1792	Succeeded by James Kenan
North Carolina House of Representatives
Preceded by Thomas Hicks	Member of the North Carolina House of Commons from Duplin County; 1779–1780, 1782–1784	Succeeded by Robert Dickson
