= Alexander Lillington =

- Born: 1725; Beaufort Precinct, North Carolina, British America
- Died: April 1786 (aged 60–61); New Hanover County, North Carolina, U.S.
- Burial place: Lillington Cemetery, Rocky Point, Pender County, North Carolina
- Spouse: Sarah Waters
- Relatives: Alexander Lillington (Grandfather)
- Military career
- Allegiance: United States
- Branch: North Carolina militia
- Rank: Brigadier General
- Units: Wilmington District Minutemen, North Carolina militia
- Commands: 6th North Carolina Regiment, Wilmington District Brigade
- Conflicts: War of Jenkins' Ear; Raid on Brunswick Town; War of the Regulation; Battle of Alamance; American Revolutionary War; Battle of Moore's Creek Bridge; Battle of Brier Creek; Battle of Heron's Bridge; Battle of Camden; Battle of Webber's Bridge

John Alexander Lillington (c. 1725 – April 1786), also known as Alexander John Lillington, was an American planter, politician and Patriot officer from North Carolina in the American Revolutionary War. He fought in the Battle of Moore's Creek Bridge in 1776 as Colonel of the Wilmington District Minutemen. He was afterwards commissioned as colonel of the 6th North Carolina Regiment of the Continental Army, but resigned after a month to instead serve as brigadier general of the Wilmington District Brigade of the North Carolina militia. At the Battle of Camden his troops were among the militia who fled the field. His son John Lillington also served in the North Carolina militia.

== Early life ==
John Alexander Lillington was born in about 1725 in Beaufort Precinct, Province of North Carolina and was the son of John and Sarah Porter Lillington. He was orphaned as a child and raised by his uncle, Edward Moseley. He married Sarah Waters of Brunswick County, North Carolina. They had two sons and two daughters.

== Service in the Revolutionary War ==
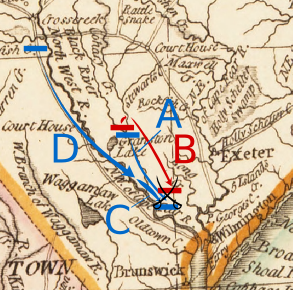
Map depicting movements toward Moore's Creek Bridge: A: Caswell's movement B: MacDonald's movement C: Lillington and Ashe's movement D: Moore's movement

He was commissioned as a colonel/commandant over the Wilmington District Minutemen battalion in August 1775. He led this battalion at the Battle of Moore's Creek Bridge on February 27, 1776. All North Carolina minutemen battalions were disbanded on April 10, 1776.

On April 15, 1776, he was commissioned as colonel/commandant over the newly created 6th North Carolina Regiment of the North Carolina Line. He resigned his commission on December 31, 1776 due to ill health.

On February 12, 1779, he was assigned as brigadier general over the Wilmington District Brigade of the North Carolina militia. He replaced General John Ashe (general). He led the brigade at the Battle of Briar Creek on March 3, 1779, Battle of Heron's Bridge on January 30, 1780, and Battle of Webber's Bridge on August 17, 1780. In January 1780, he was responsible for building breastworks in defense of Charleston, South Carolina. He and his troops were discharged from these duties well before the surrender of the city in March of 1780. Except for a period where he took a leave of absence in the summer of 1781, he retained the command of the Brigade until the end of the war.

== Political career ==
He served as a representative from New Hanover County in the North Carolina House of Commons in 1777.

== Death ==
He died in April 1786 in New Hanover County, North Carolina (in the area that later became Pender County, North Carolina). He was buried in the Lillington Cemetery, Rocky Point, North Carolina.

== Namesakes ==
The town of Lillington, county seat of Harnett County, North Carolina, was named for him in 1874. The town was originally called Harnett Court House.

== Bibliography ==
- Purcell, L. Edward. Who Was Who in the American Revolution. New York: Facts on File, 1993. ISBN 0-8160-2107-4.
