= James Kenan =

American politician

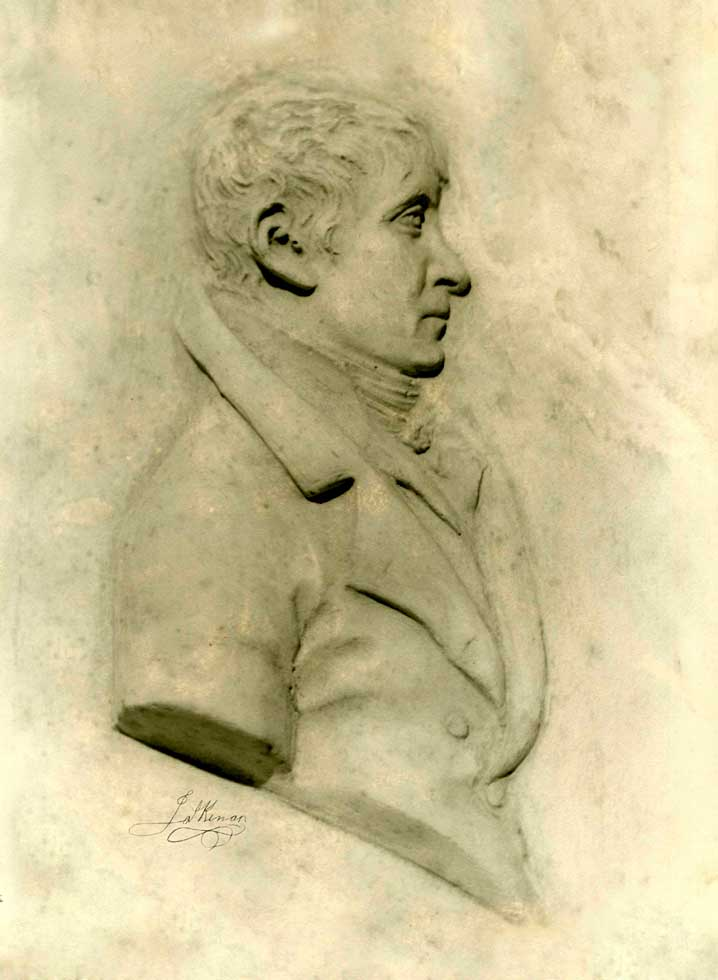
- Born: September 23, 1740; Turkey, North Carolina, U.S.
- Died: May 23, 1810 (aged 69); Turkey, North Carolina, U.S.
- Burial place: Graham Cemetery, Liberty Hall, Kenansville, North Carolina, U.S.
- Spouse: Sarah Love (m. 1770)
- Children: 8, including Thomas S. Kenan
- Military career
- Allegiance: United States
- Branch: North Carolina militia
- Rank: Brigadier General pro tempore
- Commands: Duplin Regiment (1775–1783); Wilmington District (1781)
- Battles: American Revolutionary War; Battle of Moore's Creek Bridge; Battle of Briar Creek; Battle of Stono Ferry; Battle of Heron's Bridge; Battle of Cohera Swamp; Battle of Myhand's Bridge; Battle of Portevent's Mill; Battle of Rockfish Creek

James Kenan (September 23, 1740 – May 23, 1810) was a member of the North Carolina Senate, serving from 1777 to 1793. A senior officer of militia; he also commanded a North Carolina regiment, and temporarily a militia district (brigade), in the Southern Theater of the American Revolutionary War.

== Early life and the American Revolution ==
James Kenan was born on September 23, 1740, at The Lilacs in Turkey, North Carolina, to Thomas, born in Ireland, and Elizabeth (née Johnston) Kenan. He was elected Sheriff of Duplin County, North Carolina, at age 22. He led a company of volunteers to Wilmington, North Carolina to oppose the Stamp Act. He also served as Chairman of the Duplin and Wilmington Committee of Safety.

During the American Revolutionary War, Kenan commanded the Duplin Regiment. In 1781, he was appointed Brigadier General pro tempore and placed in temporary command of Wilmington District. After the American Revolutionary War, he was appointed brigadier general of North Carolina militia.

== North Carolina Senate (1777–1793) ==
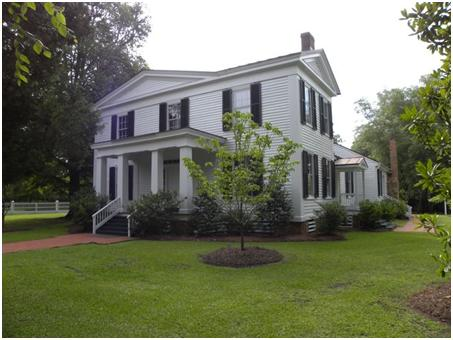
Historic Liberty Hall at Kenansville, North Carolina; James Kenan's estate.

Kenan served as a member of the state constitutional convention in 1788 and 1789. Kenan also served as chairman on Ratification of the United States Constitution in the Fayetteville Convention and was one of the first trustees of the University of North Carolina. He served ten terms (1777–1783) as a member of the North Carolina Senate.

== Death ==
Kenan died on May 23, 1810, at The Lilacs in Turkey, North Carolina. Originally buried at The Lilacs, he was reinterred at historic Liberty Hall in Kenansville, his 1800s era estate.

== Personal life ==
Kenan married Sarah Love "Sallie" March 13, 1770, and produced eight children, including his son Thomas S. Kenan. Thomas Kenan served in the North Carolina legislature and three terms as North Carolina representative in the U.S. Congress. Five members of his family would later become sheriff of Duplin County. A Mason, he served as the master of St. John's Lodge, No. 13, of Duplin County.

On April 24, 1788, James Kenan, along with James Gillespie, and Joseph Dickson, were appointed guardians of the orphaned children of James Love. Kenan Love, the oldest orphan, was allowed to choose his own guardian and chose George Morrisay. James Love commanded a company of patriots from Duplin County in the Battle of Moore's Creek Bridge. Love and a group of patriots were "taken by surprise and brutally murdered by the British at Alexander Rouse's tavern near the little bridge a few miles above Wilmington."

== Honors ==
Historical marker F-26 was erected in his honor on North Carolina highway 24 about three miles west of Warsaw. In November 2007, he was inducted into the Duplin County Hall of Fame. In 1818 the new county seat of Duplin was named "Kenansville" in his honor. James Kenan High School located in Warsaw, North Carolina, was named after him in 1958.

== Bibliography ==
- Register, Alvaretta Kenan (1967). The Kenan family and some allied families of the compiler and publisher. Statesboro, Georgia, United States: J. S. Kenan II.
