= 6th North Carolina Regiment =

Regiment that fought in the American Revolution

- Active: 1776-1783
- Country: United States
- Allegiance: North Carolina
- Branch: Continental Army
- Type: Infantry
- Part of: Northern Department, North Carolina Line
- Engagements: Battle of Brandywine, Battle of Germantown, Battle of Monmouth

The 6th North Carolina Regiment was one of ten regiments of the North Carolina Line of the Continental Army that fought in the American Revolution.

== History ==
The 6th North Carolina Regiment existed as a Continental Army unit from North Carolina from 1776 to 1779. Key events in its history include:

- March 26, 1776, North Carolina began raising troops for service in the Continental Army, including troops in the Wilmington and Hillsborough military districts of North Carolina that would become the 6th North Carolina Regiment.
- April 15, 1776, 6th North Carolina Regiment authorized by the Continental Congress and placed under the Southern Department of the Continental Army under Major General Charles Lee.
- February 5, 1777, placed under the Northern Department of the Continental Army under Major General Philip Schuyler.
- July 8, 1777, assigned to the North Carolina Brigade of the Northern Department.
- May 29, 1778, 6th regiment folded into the 1st North Carolina Regiment by the Continental Congress due to low numbers of soldiers.
- February 1779, furloughed soldiers recalled to resurrect the 5th North Carolina Regiment, as well as the 6th North Carolina Regiment; became part of the Southern Department under Major General Benjamin Lincoln.
- Late 1779, 6th North Carolina Regiment is dissolved when the nine month service of soldiers expired, officers went on to serve in North Carolina militia units.

The regiment saw action at the Battle of Brandywine in Pennsylvania on September 11, 1777, Battle of Germantown in Pennsylvania on October 4, 1777, Battle of Brier Creek in Georgia on March 3, 1779, and Battle of Stono Ferry in South Carolina on June 20, 1779.

== Officers ==
The field grade officers included

- Col. John Alexander Lillington (commander in 1776)
- Lt. Col. William Taylor
- Colonel Gideon Lamb (commander 1777-1781, also major and lieutenant colonel)
- Lt. Col. Archibald Lytle
- Maj. John Baptiste Ashe

All company grade officers were considered to be part of the North Carolina Militia vice Continental Army. Some enlisted men were on the Continental roll and others were on militia rolls. The company grade officers and enlisted troops signed up for nine months of service at a time. They were recruited from the Wilmington and Hillsborough Districts of North Carolina. Captain Griffith John McRee became the namesake for the 1836 Union Fort McRee in Pensacola Florida. Other known captains included:

- Andrew Armstrong
- John Baptist Ashe, also Major
- Francis Child
- Arthur Council
- Thomas Donoho
- George Dougherty
- William Glover
- John James
- Archibald Lytle
- Griffith John McRee (see Fort McRee)
- George Mitchell
- Benjamin Pike
- Jesse Saunders
- Philip Taylor
- Thomas White
- Daniel Williams

== See also ==
- Departments of the Continental Army
- North Carolina Line
