= John Ashe (general) =

American militia general (1725–1781)

- Born: March 24, 1725; New Hanover County (present-day Brunswick County), North Carolina
- Died: October 24, 1781 (aged 56); Duplin County (present-day Sampson County), North Carolina
- Burial place: Sampson County, North Carolina
- Education: Harvard University (dropped out)
- Spouse: Rebecca Moore (m. 1745)
- Children: 7
- Relatives: Samuel Ashe (brother)
- Military career
- Allegiance: Great Britain; United Colonies; United States
- Branch: North Carolina militia
- Service years: 1754–1779
- Rank: Major General
- Commands: New Hannover Regiment (1775-76); Volunteer Independent Rangers (1776); Wilmington Brigade (1776-78); North Carolina Militia (1778-79)
- Battles: French and Indian War; War of the Regulation; Battle of Alamance; American Revolutionary War; Battle of Moore's Creek Bridge; Battle of Brier Creek

Major General John Ashe (March 24, 1725 – October 24, 1781) was a senior officer of the North Carolina Militia during the American Revolutionary War. Prior to that, he served as the Speaker of the North Carolina House of Burgesses from 1762 to 1765.

== Early life and education ==
Ashe was born at Grovely in New Hanover County (present-day Brunswick County), North Carolina, on March 24, 1725, to John Baptista and Elizabeth (née Swann) Ashe. He attended Harvard University but dropped out. Settling northeast of the Cape Fear River, he built a plantation called Green Hill.

Ashe served as a colonel in the North Carolina Militia during the French and Indian War (1754–1763). In 1752, Ashe was elected to the North Carolina House of Burgesses, serving as speaker of the House of Burgesses from 1762 to 1765. An outspoken opponent of the Stamp Act and eventually a supporter of independence from Great Britain, Ashe served in the North Carolina Provincial Congress and on both the committees of correspondence and safety as hostilities between the colonies and Great Britain began to rise.

== American Revolutionary War ==
As a result of his opposition to the Stamp Act, Ashe resigned his royal commission as a colonel in the militia and was elected colonel in the patriot militia by the people of New Hanover County in 1775. In January 1776, he was commissioned as the commandant with a rank of colonel over the Volunteer Independent Rangers. Leading a force of 500 men, Ashe destroyed the British garrison of Fort Johnston, North Carolina, in 1775. Raising and equipping this unit at his own expense, Ashe led his regiment in the American victory at the Battle of Moore's Creek Bridge on February 27, 1776. The unit was disbanded after this battle.

On May 4, 1776, Ashe was commissioned as brigadier general of militia to command the Wilmington Brigade. Under his leadership, he constructed defenses for an anticipated British assault on the Cape Fear region. However, the British bypassed Cape Fear and attacked Charleston, South Carolina, instead. On November 8, 1778, Ashe was commissioned as North Carolina's first major general and placed in command of the state militia.

Ashe was dispatched to support Continental Army Major General Benjamin Lincoln following the British capture of Savannah, Georgia in late 1778. Ashe's militia forces first marched to Purrysburg, South Carolina, where Lincoln had established his camp, but was then sent north to join forces threatening Augusta, Georgia, which was being held by British Lieutenant Colonel Archibald Campbell. Ashe's advance in early February 1779 prompted Campbell to abandon Augusta, and Ashe followed him southward in Georgia. Ashe halted just above Briar Creek, where the British had burned out a bridge during their retreat, and established a camp while he traveled back to South Carolina for a war council with Lincoln. Ashe returned to the Brier Creek camp on March 2.

Campbell had, however, been active. In a plan that was well executed by Colonel Mark Prevost, most of the British force embarked on a lengthy detour to flank Ashe's camp while a diversionary force demonstrated on the far side of the burned-out bridge. The British approached his camp from the rear on March 3, with Ashe's force having just 15 minutes notice to prepare for the onslaught. Ashe's poorly trained and supplied militia were routed, with an estimated 150 casualties compared to around 16 British casualties. Ashe was subjected to a court martial, which found that although he was not entirely to blame for the debacle, he was guilty of setting inadequate guards around his camp.

== Death ==
Returning to Wilmington, he remained active there in suppressing Loyalist activity in the district. He was captured and held as a prisoner of war following the town's occupation in 1781 by the army of General Lord Cornwallis. Contracting smallpox while imprisoned, Ashe was paroled, but died on October 24 in Duplin County (present-day Sampson County), North Carolina shortly after his release from captivity.

== Personal life ==
Ashe married Rebecca Moore, sister of Maurice Moore and James Moore. They had four sons: William, Samuel, John, and A'Court and three daughters: Harriet, Eliza, and Mary. One of his sons, John Ashe Jr., served as a captain in the 4th North Carolina Regiment. Governor Samuel Ashe, for whom Asheville, North Carolina, was named, was his younger brother, and other descendants have continued to play a role in North Carolina politics, including Margaret Ashe Pruette, arrested as part of Moral Monday during the 2013 North Carolina legislative protests.

Government offices
New office	North Carolina State Treasurer for Wilmington District; 1777–1781	Succeeded by Timothy Bloodworth
