= James Moore (Continental Army officer) =

Continental Army officer (c. 1737–c. 1777)

- Born: c. 1737; New Hanover Precinct, North Carolina
- Died: c. April 15, 1777 (aged 39–40); Wilmington, North Carolina
- Relatives: James Moore (grandfather); Alfred Moore (nephew)
- Military career
- Allegiance: Great Britain (1758–1763, 1771); United Colonies (1775–1776); United States (1776–1777)
- Branch: Continental Army
- Rank: Brigadier General
- Commands: 1st North Carolina Regiment (1775–1776); 1st North Carolina Brigade (1776–1777); Southern Department (1776–1777)
- Conflicts: French and Indian War; War of the Regulation; Battle of Alamance; American Revolutionary War: Battle of Moore's Creek Bridge

James Moore (c. 1737 – c. April 15, 1777) was an American military officer who served in the Continental Army during the American Revolutionary War. Moore was born into a prominent political family in the colonial Province of North Carolina, he was one of only five generals from North Carolina to serve in the Continental Army. He spent much of his childhood and youth on his family's estates in the lower Cape Fear River area, but soon became active in the colonial military structure in North Carolina.

Moore served in the North Carolina Militia during the French and Indian War, and commanded the militia's artillery at the Battle of Alamance, which ended the War of the Regulation. In addition to his military involvement, he was active in the independence movement, despite having been a supporter of the colonial government during his early career. Moore played a prominent role in the local Sons of Liberty organizations, and assisted in organizing the colony-wide extra-legal Provincial Congress. In 1775, he was elected the first commander of a Continental Line regiment in North Carolina, which had been raised following the instructions of the Continental Congress.

After distinguishing himself in the campaign that led to the Patriot victory at the Battle of Moore's Creek Bridge, and the battle's aftermath on February 27, 1776, Moore was promoted to brigadier general in the Continental Army. He maintained his headquarters in North Carolina during early 1776 to thwart a threatened British invasion of the state but, in the latter part of the year, received orders to move his command to South Carolina. Moore briefly held de facto command of the Southern Department before his death due to illness in April 1777. He is remembered as a competent military commander whose early death ended a promising career.

== Early life and family ==
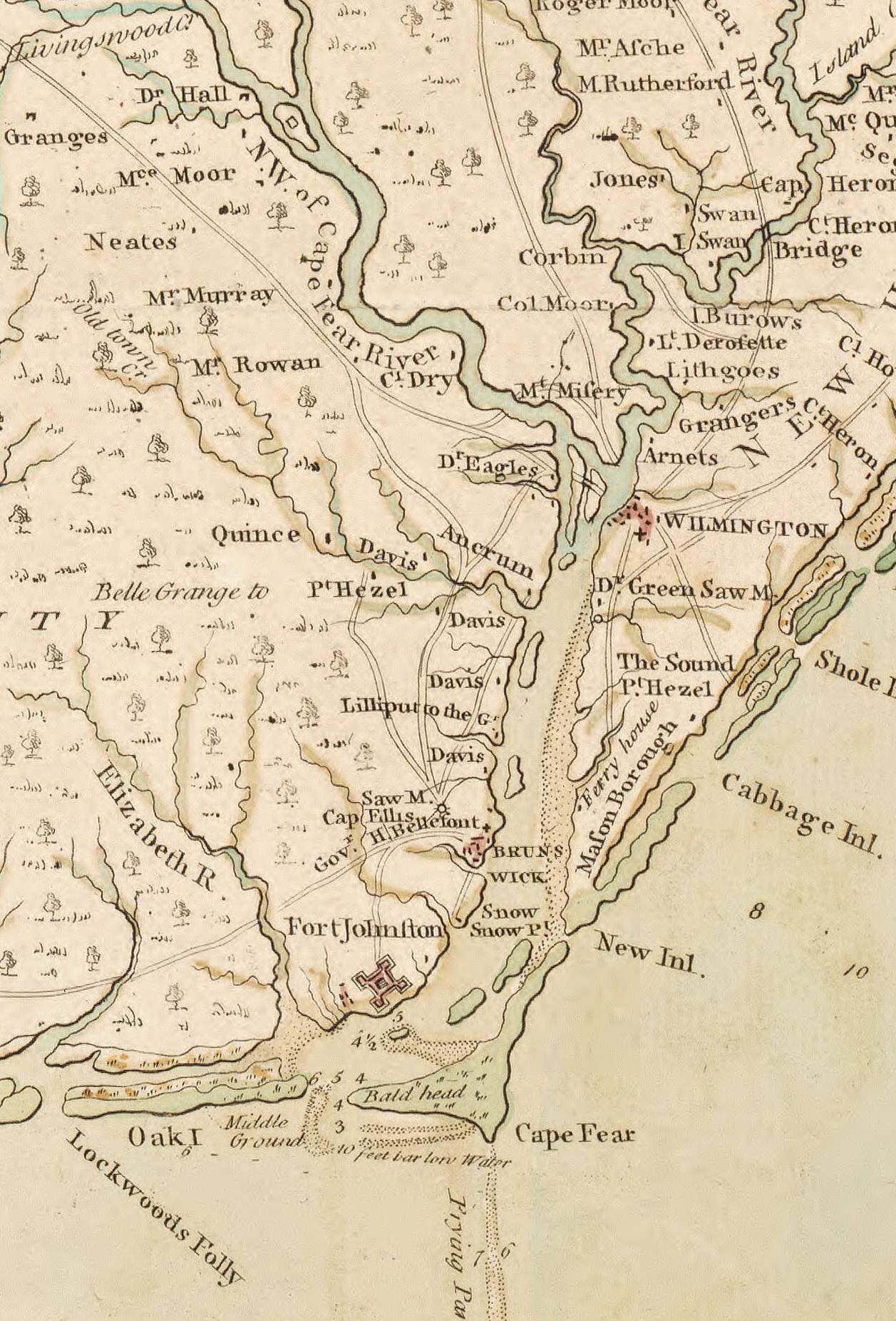
An excerpt of John Collet's 1770 map depicting the environs of Wilmington and the Cape Fear River, including Fort Johnston and the Moore family land holdings (at the upper left)

James Moore was born in New Hanover Precinct in the Cape Fear region of the Carolinas in about 1737. His family had extensive landholdings at Rocky Point, located at a bend in the Cape Fear River about 15 miles (24 km) north of Wilmington. He was the son of Maurice Moore I, and his second wife, Mary Porter. His older brother, also named Maurice Moore II, would go on to become a Patriot political leader in North Carolina during the American Revolution. His sister, Rebecca Moore, would marry a Revolutionary War leader, militia General John Ashe.

Moore was, through his father's side, a grandson of Governor James Moore, who was governor of the Province of Carolina. Maurice Moore had championed settlement of the Cape Fear region under Governor George Burrington. Additionally, Moore's uncle, Colonel James Moore, was a military leader during the Yamasee War. Moore's nephew, Alfred Moore, served in the Continental Army under Moore's command and would go on to become an Associate Justice of the United States Supreme Court. Moore's niece, Mary, would later marry Moore's Continental Army colleague Francis Nash.

Moore's extended relatives constituted the single most powerful family in the region, and were known by local settlers simply as "the Family". His nine aunts and uncles, and seventeen siblings and cousins on his father's side, married into other affluent families, developing a strong network in the region that perpetuated their wealth and influence, and increased their slaveholdings in each successive generation. By the time of the American Revolution, six of the ten largest slaveholders in the lower Cape Fear region were in some way related to Moore. The Moore family relied on the production of naval stores and lumber, as the lower Cape Fear was unsuited to mass cultivation of more profitable products and crops like rice and indigo.

One early description of Moore states that he spent his early years on his father's plantation until that tract was sold in 1761. In his adulthood, Moore married Anna Ivey, with whom he had two sons and two daughters, all of whom survived him at his death. One son, James Moore Jr., would serve in the American Revolutionary War as a lieutenant before being permanently disabled by wounds received at the Battle of Eutaw Springs.

== Colonial political and military service ==
James Moore had experience as a military officer before the American Revolution. In 1758, Governor Arthur Dobbs appointed him as the captain of a provincial garrison company at Fort Johnston, and Moore remained in command of that unit during the French and Indian War. During that conflict, Moore was captain of a company he led to South Carolina to defend that colony against Cherokee attacks brought on by the Anglo-Cherokee War. By 1759, he was appointed a justice of the peace. In protest of the Stamp Act, in 1766 Moore led an armed mob that occupied the de facto capital town of Brunswick, North Carolina. The mob appointed Moore as its delegate to confront Governor William Tryon and the royal comptroller of customs, William Pennington, who had taken refuge at Tryon's home. Pennington gave in to the demands of the mob, and resigned his post, swearing that he would not enforce the provisions of the Stamp Act.

Moore served as a colonel of an artillery company in the North Carolina Militia during the War of the Regulation, a revolt by western settlers against perceived injustices in the colonial government of North Carolina in the decade immediately preceding the American Revolution. At the Battle of Alamance, Moore served as the commander of Governor Tryon's artillery company. Moore's orders in that engagement were to fire his cannons once Tryon had determined the Regulators would not surrender, thus signaling the beginning of the battle. During the conflict, however, the governor's artillery functioned poorly, and the Regulators were able to gain an initial advantage by fighting irregularly. The governor's forces eventually succeeded in crushing the armed farmers, thus ending the Regulator rebellion. Moore went on to serve in the North Carolina House of Commons from 1764 to 1771 and again in 1773, representing his home county of New Hanover. In 1772, he purchased a plantation of 500 acres (200 ha; 0.78 sq mi) on the Cape Fear River several miles upriver from Wilmington.

== American Revolution ==
=== Revolutionary activities ===
Moore participated in the Wilmington chapter of the Sons of Liberty beginning in 1770, and through them organized a boycott of imported British goods on the Cape Fear River. On July 21, 1774, Moore was elected to a Wilmington-based committee tasked with organizing the First North Carolina Provincial Congress with other counties. Moore also participated in the New Hanover Committee of Safety, and worked with other local citizens to raise supplies for Boston, whose port had been closed to all commerce in 1774 by the Boston Port Act. In August 1775, he was elected to the Third Provincial Congress, which organized the colonial militia and placed Moore in command of the first regiment raised to be trained as regular soldiers. At the time, Loyalist-sympathizer and Cape Fear-area diarist Janet Schaw described her fear of Moore as the commander of the Patriot militia, stating:

He is a man of free property and a most unblemished character, has amiable manners, and a virtuous life has gained him the love of everybody, and his popularity is such that I am assured he will have more followers than any other man in the province. He acts from a steady tho' mistaken principle, and I am certain has no view or design, but what he thinks right and for the good of the country. He urges not war of words, and when my brother told him he would not join him, for he did not approve the cause, 'Then do not,' said he, 'let every man be directed by his own ideas of right or wrong.' If this man commands, be assured, he will find his enemies work.

Moore's appointment as commander of the first regiment of what would become the North Carolina Line came at the expense of his brother-in-law, John Ashe, who actively sought the appointment. Moore bested Ashe by only a single vote in the Provincial Congress. His service dates were:

- Colonel over the New Hanover County Regiment of the North Carolina militia (1775)
- Colonel over the 1st North Carolina Regiment (1775–1776)
- Brigadier General over the 1st Brigade (4th, 5th and 6th Regiments) of the North Carolina Line (1776)
- Brigadier General of the Southern Department of the Continental Army (1776–1777)

=== Moore's Creek Bridge campaign ===
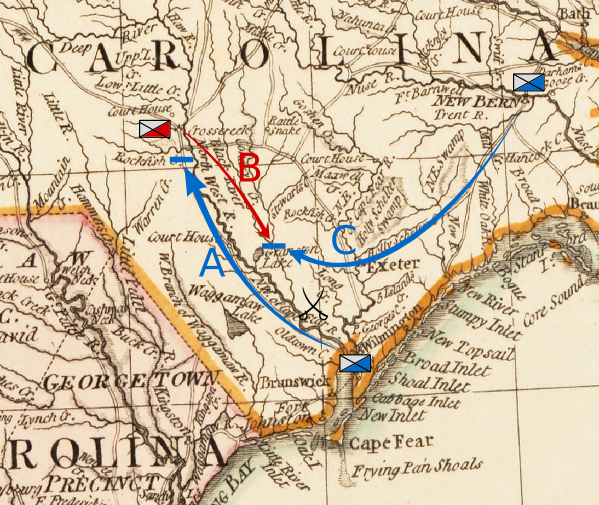
Map depicting movements before the Battle of Moore's Creek Bridge: A: James Moore moves north toward Cross Creek, to confront the Loyalists B: Loyalists move south towards Wilmington C: Caswell moves from New Bern confront the Loyalists

On February 15, 1776, Moore was given command of the 1st North Carolina Regiment raised at the direction of the Second Continental Congress, and placed in charge of the defense of the Cape Fear region. At the same time, the colonial government in New Bern organized militia units under Colonel Richard Caswell, and sent this force south to meet up with Moore's regiment of regulars and several other units of militia. A force of approximately 1,400 Scottish Highlanders in North Carolina who remained loyal to Britain was organized shortly after the outbreak of hostilities in 1775. This force, concentrated around the Loyalist hotbed of Cross Creek (near modern-day Fayetteville), alarmed the Patriot government, who dispatched Moore and Caswell to contain the growing army.

The British Army and Royal Navy, in cooperation with the Loyalist elements of the colonial government under Governor Josiah Martin, planned an invasion of North Carolina near Wilmington, a burgeoning and strategically located seaport in the Cape Fear region. The Loyalist units at Cross Creek were directed to join up with British Army units, which General Thomas Gage intended to land in North Carolina. Moore led his command upriver along the south bank of the Cape Fear and fortified a river crossing at Rockfish Creek, which would have been the Loyalists' most direct path to Wilmington. At this site, Moore continued to gather reinforcements, eventually commanding approximately 1,100 men. Brigadier-General Donald MacDonald, who commanded a force of approximately 1,500 Loyalists, sent an envoy to Moore, demanding that he join the Loyalist cause or be faced with an attack. Moore, delaying in his reply to buy time, eventually declined that demand, essentially calling MacDonald's bluff. MacDonald, whose men lacked the morale for an immediate confrontation, received word that Caswell's militia had been ordered to join with Moore. Sensing that time was of the essence, MacDonald withdrew, and led the Loyalist contingent away from Moore toward a crossing further downriver.

Moore next set about devising a trap for MacDonald's Loyalist contingent. He positioned a detachment of men at Cross Creek, and ordered the regiments of Colonels Caswell and Alexander Lillington to a location downriver in the path of the Loyalist militia. The Loyalist force managed to slip past Caswell, at which point Moore ordered Caswell to join up with Lillington at a location known as Moore's Creek Bridge. Simultaneously with Caswell's corrective maneuver, Moore floated his troops 60 miles (97 km) downriver, where they disembarked and joined in the pursuit of MacDonald's force. In the Battle of Moore's Creek Bridge, the Loyalists attempted to cross over the creek in the early morning hours of February 27, 1776, where they were met with fierce resistance from Caswell and Lillington's united forces. The Patriots routed the Loyalists in less than three minutes, inflicting severe casualties on MacDonald's men and capturing 850 loyalist soldiers and officers, while themselves suffering only a single casualty.

Moore did not participate directly in the battle, but arrived shortly after it was decided, and pursued the remaining Loyalist units. Moore's Creek Bridge stopped the British plan for the conquest of North Carolina and was celebrated by Patriots throughout the colonies. The British press of the time downplayed the defeat as it involved only Loyalist forces and no British Army units. On March 4, 1776, the Provincial Congress in New Bern passed a resolution thanking Moore for his service in defeating the Loyalists.

=== Continental Army general ===
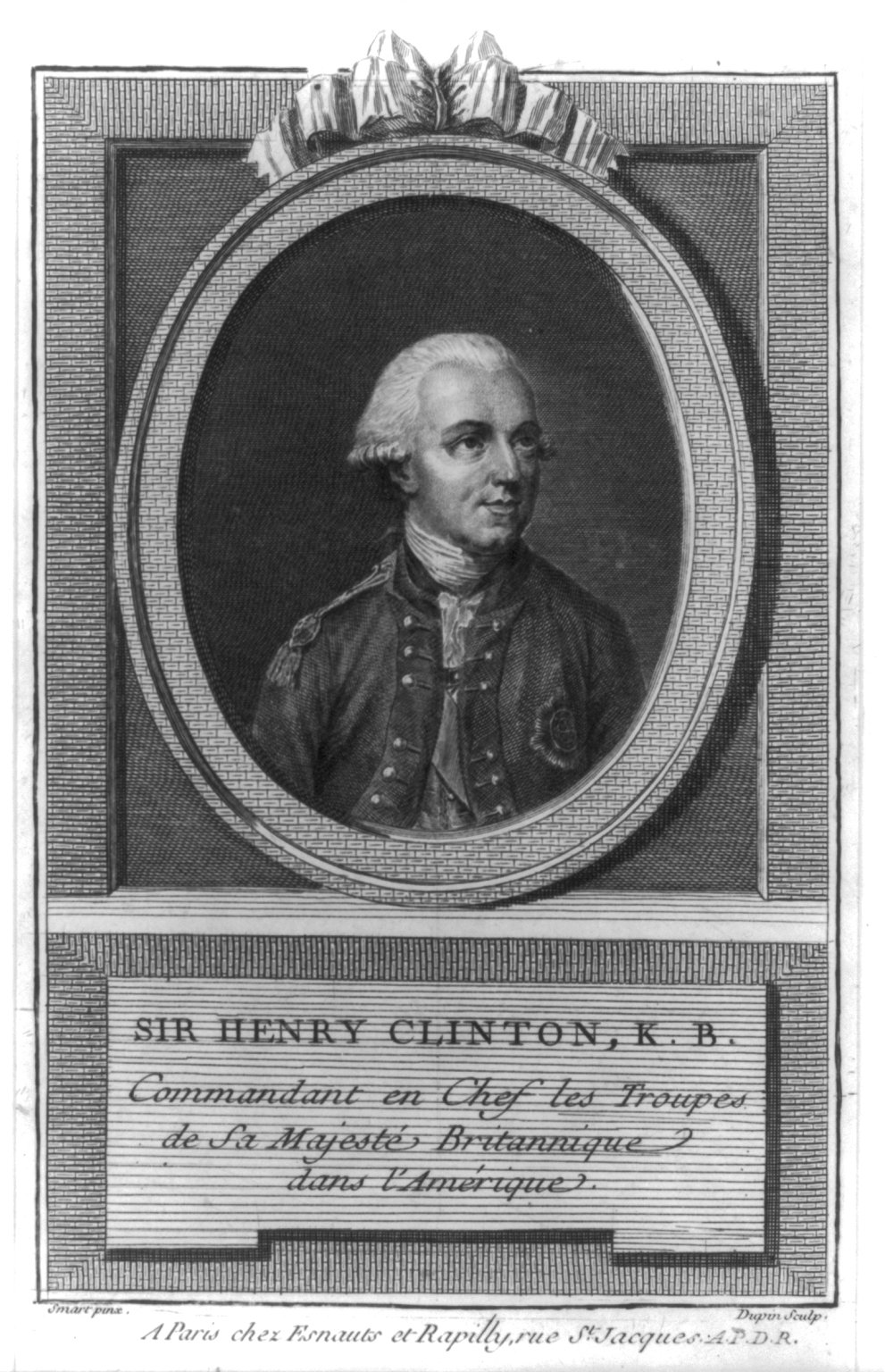
General Sir Henry Clinton, portrait c. 1770–1780. Clinton threatened Moore at Wilmington, but withdrew to assault Charleston instead.

On March 1, 1776, the Continental Congress voted to give Moore a commission as a brigadier general in the Continental Army, and placed him in command of all of the regular army forces in North Carolina. Moore was one of only five North Carolinians to achieve the rank of brigadier general or higher in the Continental Army. As a brigadier, he served under General Charles Lee, commander of the army's Southern Department, and was tasked with guarding Wilmington from attacks by British ships in the Cape Fear area after the Battle of Moore's Creek Bridge. In that capacity, Moore alternately harassed and observed British and Loyalist forces while simultaneously improving Wilmington's defenses by erecting two new coastal batteries, and by scuttling ships in the main channel of the Cape Fear River south of the city to bar passage by larger vessels. In April and May 1776, some British units from the approximately 7,000-strong force of General Sir Henry Clinton disembarked near Wilmington, and threatened to confront Moore's garrison of 1,847 men. Clinton soon decided that North Carolina was not an ideal objective, and the majority of the British fleet and army made its way south to Charleston on May 30, 1776.

After the near-engagement at Wilmington, Moore devised a plan by which the Provincial Congress raised five additional companies of men to defend North Carolina's coast. He saw this as necessary because the Continental Army units in North Carolina could be ordered out of the state, which would have left North Carolina relatively defenseless. Lee was recalled to the north to aid in the defense of New York in September 1776, and Moore was placed in command of the Southern Department. Initially, the Continental Congress ordered Moore to join General George Washington in the north, but owing to the continued threat of a British attack in North or South Carolina, Congress suspended Moore's orders and gave North Carolina's Provincial Council discretion over his disposition. On October 23, 1776, the Council ordered Moore to remain in North Carolina and winter his troops in New Bern and Wilmington. This order was confirmed by the Continental Congress on November 16, along with instructions for Moore to assist in repelling any invasion attempts in South Carolina or Georgia, if necessary.

Moore then led his command of about 2,035 men south to Charleston, South Carolina in November to assist the Patriot forces there after the failed British naval bombardment at Sullivan's Island. Moore's brigade arrived in January, but Moore spent most of his time traveling between Charleston and North Carolina, lobbying for funds and clothing for his poorly equipped soldiers, and recruiting more men. He went so far as to obtain a private loan from Thomas Polk, a planter in Mecklenburg County, for $6,250 in South Carolina currency to pay for rations for his command. Moore's unit engaged in daily drills under his supervision and that of Colonel Francis Nash. Despite these efforts, the North Carolinians suffered from rampant colds and pneumonia, and many of the enlisted men deserted to join the South Carolina line because of the high bounty being offered by that state for service.

In February 1777, the Continental Congress commanded Moore to bring North Carolina's Continental Army troops north to aid Washington, but a lack of supplies and provisions stalled that plan. Moore himself had returned to North Carolina on January 8, 1777, in an attempt to alleviate the poor conditions in which his soldiers found themselves, and to raise funds to pay his men, leaving the Southern Department under the command of Brigadier General Robert Howe. Howe countermanded Moore's instructions to bring the Continental Army units north by refusing to permit the North Carolina brigade to leave Charleston out of fear of a British attack in the south. Because of Moore's failing health, Francis Nash was promoted to brigadier general, and assumed command of the brigade on its march north.

== Death and legacy ==
While preparing to march north in early 1777, Moore became ill. He died of what was called "a fit of gout in his stomach" on about April 15, 1777. Oral tradition holds that Moore died on the same day and in the same house as his brother, Maurice. Anne, Moore's wife, died a few months thereafter.

Moore, who had not been directly involved in any military engagement during the Revolutionary War, was nonetheless able to construct a working military force out of the disparate parts provided for him by North Carolina. Samuel A'Court Ashe, an early North Carolina historian, described Moore as "perhaps the most masterful military man furnished by North Carolina to the war of independence." Another historian speculated that Moore's "actions had held the promise of greatness." Moore's strategic command before and during the Battle of Moore's Creek Bridge has been acclaimed as a major factor in the Patriot victory there.

The Wake Forest, North Carolina chapter of the Daughters of the American Revolution and a U.S. Army battery at the now defunct Fort Casey in Washington state were named in his honor. In 1940, the North Carolina Department of Cultural Resources erected a North Carolina highway historical marker in Pender County near Moore's former home at Rocky Point commemorating his life and Revolutionary War service.
