= Fort Johnston (North Carolina) =

- U.S. National Register of Historic Places
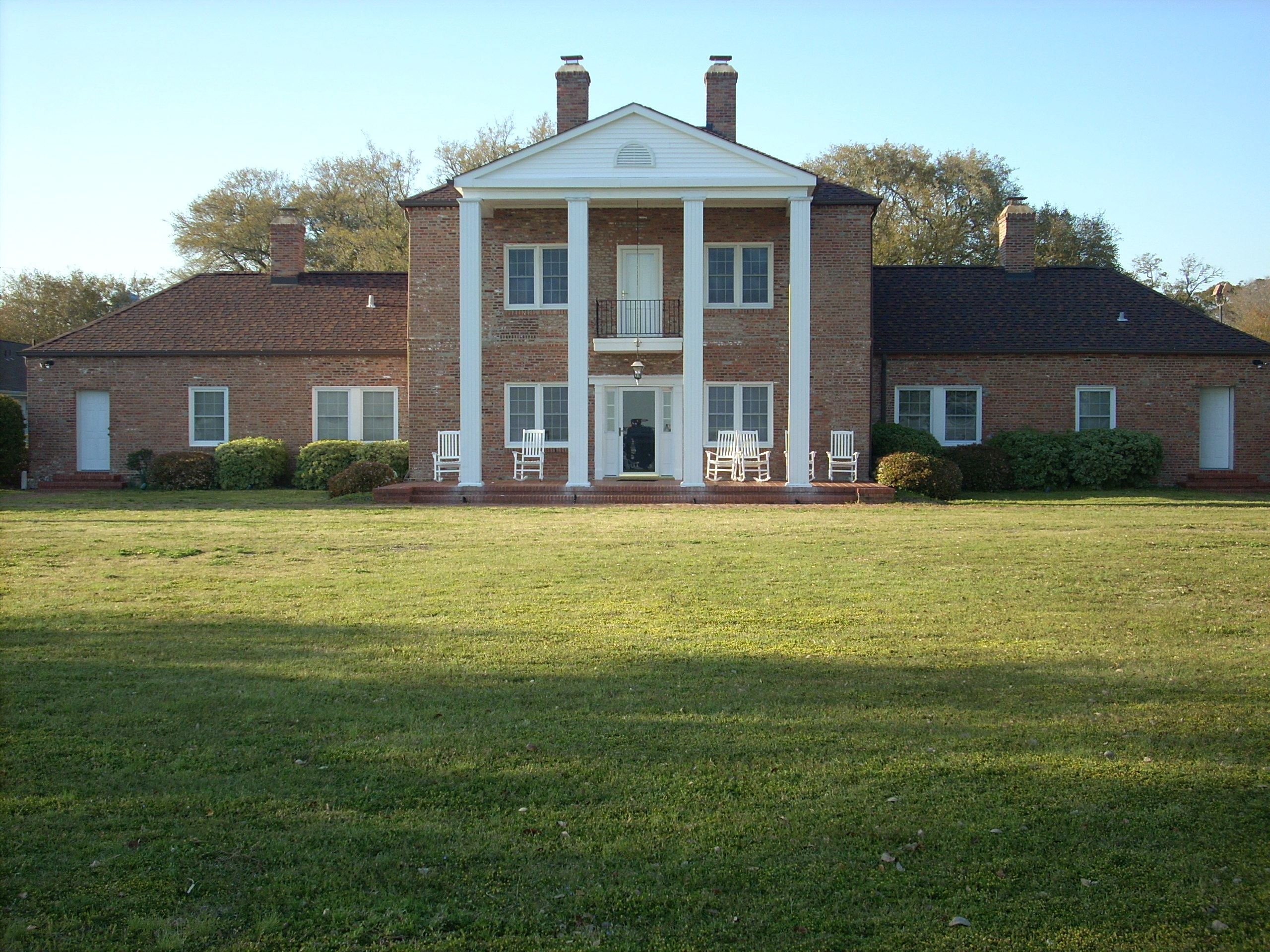

- Location within North Carolina Location within the United States
- Location: Moore Street; Southport, North Carolina
- Coordinates: 33°55′5″N 78°01′3″W
- Area: 6 acres (2.4 ha)
- NRHP reference No.: 74001327
- Added to NRHP: 7 June 1974

Fort Johnston was a British fort, later a United States Army post, in Brunswick County, North Carolina on Moore Street near Southport, North Carolina. It stands on the west bank of the Cape Fear River, four miles above its mouth.

== Colonial ==
Prior to the construction of Fort Johnston, Early British settlements on the Carolina coast had very few fortifications, leaving them exposed to piracy and privateering. Spanish raiders in particular took advantage of this vulnerability. In 1744, as King George’s War began between Britain and France, Governor Gabriel Johnston appointed a committee to identify an appropriate site for a fort to defend the Cape Fear River. The governor of South Carolina agreed to supply ten small cannon for the work. With Spanish privateering growing more and more aggressive, the North Carolina General Assembly in April 1745 authorized construction of “Johnston’s Fort” near the river’s mouth, and in the spring of 1748 appropriated 2,000 pounds to start building.

Two Spanish privateers in summer 1748 intended to seize enslaved persons working on construction of the fort. Finding none at the time of their raid, the privateers sailed upriver and attacked Brunswick, North Carolina by sea and land, looting the town and taking hostages over two days. The local militia eventually drove the raiders back to their ships, but the Spanish privateers continued to bombard the town for a third day. Only after one privateering ship accidentally exploded and sank did the fleet retreat toward the sea.

Although Governor Johnston declared the fort complete in April 1749, work on the fortification, the first in North Carolina colony, continued to progress well into the 1750s. North Carolina garrisoned the fort with a few dozen militia soldiers and used it for coastal protection and as a quarantine station for incoming mariners. The militia men included Captain Robert Howe, first stationed at Fort Johnston in 1766.

== American Revolutionary War ==
In 1766, armed colonists protesting the Stamp Act 1765 threatened Fort Johnston after British officials seized two merchant vessels. For nearly a decade afterward, the fort remained relatively quiet, serving as a defensive post for the lower Cape Fear River region. Rising tensions between the colonies and the Crown in the early 1770s, however, brought new assaults on the fort. American patriots attacked the home of Josiah Martin, British royal governor of the Province of North Carolina, at New Bern, on 24 May 1775. Governor Martin then sent his family to New York, transferred his headquarters to Fort Johnston on 2 June 1775, and instigated a plot to arm enslaved persons. After the patriots discovered this plot, John Ashe of the Wilmington Committee of Safety led a group of patriotic colonists in a plot against Fort Johnson in July 1775. Governor Martin and his supporters removed most military stores, dismounted the cannon of the fort, and fled aboard the British sloop-of-war Cruiser at anchor in the Cape Fear River. American patriots controlled, burnt, and destroyed Fort Johnston, including the home of its commandant. Governor Martin rallied Loyalist forces from his offshore redoubt.

During winter 1775/1776, the British army sent seven regular regiments and two companies of artillery to the lower Cape Fear region, aspiring to rouse Loyalist colonists to take arms to restore Royal Governor Martin to power. Colonel James Moore, however, routed a numerically superior force of Scottish Highlanders in Battle of Moore's Creek Bridge on 27 February 1776, and the British abandoned their strategy. The British fleet still maintained some control of the region for the succeeding few years.

In 1778, the North Carolina General Assembly appropriated £5000 to rebuild Fort Johnston and named Captain Robert Ellis to command the fort. When British Major James Henry Craig entered the region on 25 January 1781, Captain Ellis left Fort Johnston. Major Craig aimed to establish a supply base for General Charles Cornwallis and probably destroyed the nascent Fort Johnston again. General Cornwallis later surrendered to American General George Washington after the siege of Yorktown, Virginia, on 17 October 1781. American troops under General Griffith Rutherford advanced toward Wilmington in mid-November 1781, and British Major Craig withdrew.

== Antebellum period ==
Following the American Revolutionary War, peace prevailed, and Fort Johnston underwent a period of physical decay. The community of Smithville, North Carolina, (later renamed Southport) gradually developed around the fort. Benjamin Smith apparently opposed incorporation of the town in the state General Assembly in 1790; however, the legislature supposedly named the town in his honor to gain his support. His opponents allegedly supported the idea only because they believed that the town would not prosper. The town started with one hundred half-acre lots.

In March 1794 with war raging in Europe, the Congress appropriated funds for the first system of seacoast defense in the United States to fortify sixteen critical ports on the seaboard, provided that states provide the land. North Carolina quickly ceded the land to the federal government. Although reconstruction began in July 1794, work on Fort Johnston progressed slowly over decades. Politician Benjamin Smith ultimately agreed to sponsor the reconstruction of the fort. Major Joseph Gardner Swift characterized Fort Johnston as "dilapidated" upon inspecting the post in January 1810.

The fort probably contained a seawall, battery, quarters for officers, barracks for enlisted men, gunpowder magazine, bakery, and other buildings. The fort rented a building at the corner of Nash and Howe streets from Smithville town commissioners as a hospital. The U.S. Army built quarters for officers at the fort about 1810.

In spring 1812, the Army formed a new unit, the "Sea Fencibles," composed of river pilots who resolved to serve on land and sea. Governor William Hawkins assigned four militia companies from coastal southern North Carolina to Fort Johnston to strengthen the defenses of Cape Fear during the War of 1812. Many locals feared that Fort Johnston provided inadequate defense for the region. The British, however, did not attack the region during the war.

After the War of 1812, an individual sergeant sometimes commanded Fort Johnston, and the Army abandoned it altogether at least once while engaging its troops elsewhere. Nevertheless, the surgeon began to record meteorological observations from the early 1820s. Its garrison departed to fight in Second Seminole War in 1836. The Army completed Fort Caswell two miles away in 1838, reducing the importance of Fort Johnston. The Fort Johnston garrison again departed to fight in Mexican–American War in 1846.

Soldiers at Fort Johnston enjoyed cordial relations with the civilian population of Smithville, North Carolina, throughout the antebellum years, making it a desirable posting. Early in January 1861, a delegation from Wilmington approached Governor John Willis Ellis, seeking his permission to allow seizure of Fort Johnston from the Union forces, but he denied their request.

== American Civil War ==
Local rebels, however, did not await secession of North Carolina before seizing Fort Johnston from the Union. They approached the sole caretaker sergeant posted at the fort and demanded its surrender on 8 January 1861. The Union soldier recognized his inability to mount a defense, conceded to their demands, and informed his superiors in Washington. Governor Ellis, however, compelled the rebels to evacuate the seized fort and return it to Union control. After the fall of Fort Sumter in the harbor of Charleston, South Carolina, however, Governor Ellis ordered the recapture of Fort Johnston, and the caretaker United States Army Ordnance Corps sergeant again surrendered it. North Carolina seceded from the Union on 20 May 1861 and joined the Confederate States of America.

Early in the American Civil War, Fort Johnston emerged as a center of Confederate States Army recruitment and training. Fort Johnston also served as a supply depot for the local system of fortifications, storing and distributing vast quantities of military hardware and sustenance. The Confederacy also massively renovated and upgraded the defenses of the region, including Fort Johnston, Fort Caswell, and Fort Fisher. Five hundred enslaved persons and three hundred Native Americans in bondage undertook some of the labor on this huge construction program.

The Confederacy increasingly depended on blockade runners breaking through the Union Navy lines to maintain trade necessary to sustain the war effort. With two inlets on the Cape Fear River, dangerous shoals to trap Union ships lacking the knowledge of local river pilots, the Cape Fear River made an ideal spot for blockade running. Fort Johnston coordinated these attempts and provided critical protective cover to Confederate shipping. The first Confederate steamer to run the Union blockade entered Wilmington in December 1861, and trade through Port of Wilmington increased through 1862, especially after the Union Navy successfully sealed Charleston, South Carolina, to Confederate shipping in summer 1862. An average of one ship a day ran the blockade successfully throughout 1863 and 1864. The fort and its garrison maintained the security of the Cape Fear River against Union army and naval forces with weapons, munitions, and supplies imported from Europe, Canada, Bermuda, Cuba, and eventually other Caribbean territories. Railroads carried goods from Wilmington, North Carolina, to Richmond, Virginia, providing critical supplies to Confederate General Robert E. Lee and his Confederate Army of Northern Virginia.

The Confederacy in late 1862 renamed Fort Johnston as Fort Branch in honor of Confederate Brigadier General Lawrence O'Bryan Branch, a local who died in Battle of Antietam. In 1863, the Confederate Army renamed Fort Branch as Fort Pender in honor of Confederate Major General William Dorsey Pender, who died of wounds sustained at Battle of Gettysburg.

In late 1864, President Abraham Lincoln, determined to deal a "mortal blow" to the Confederacy, developed a strategy with his military advisors to cease the only significant sustained blockade running activity, that originating from the Cape Fear River outlet. On 24 December 1864, Union warships began an intense bombardment of nearby Fort Fisher, and after a persistent onslaught, Union forces captured the vastly undermanned Fort Fisher on the evening of 15 January 1865. Brigadier General Louis Jagger Hébert then commanded Fort Pender. Facing thousands of Union troops, the Confederate garrisons in the area withdrew to Wilmington, North Carolina, and Union forces seized an undamaged Fort Pender on 17/18 January 1865.

Union Naval Lieutenant William B. Cushing led the first contingent of Union troops into Smithville, North Carolina, took the 44 sick or wounded occupants of the Confederate hospital at Fort Pender as prisoners, met with a committee of citizens, demanded the surrender of all private arms, and raised the Flag of the United States. Union troops staged at Fort Pender for their advance against Fort Anderson (North Carolina) and thence into Wilmington, which fell on 22 February 1865. The Confederacy surrendered in spring 1865, and the name of Fort Pender reverted to Fort Johnston.

== Postwar period ==
After the American Civil War, the War Department generally moved to reduce the number of coastal fortifications and the number of troops in the Army. United States Army, however, continued to garrison Fort Johnston through Reconstruction. In December 1880, the Army transferred the garrison from Fort Johnston to Washington, District of Columbia. On 21 February 1881, the government officially ended role of Fort Johnston in Seacoast defense in the United States.

In June 1881, United States Army Signal Corps reoccupied the fort. The facility later passed to the Weather Bureau, United States Army Corps of Engineers, and Surveying Corps.

United Service Organizations occupied the fort during World War II. During the early 1950s, Fort Johnston hosted officers from an air rescue unit of United States Air Force.

Military Ocean Terminal Sunny Point opened in 1955 and used Fort Johnston. From the 1950s, the facility maintained housing for four military families and one unaccompanied soldier. The family of the commanding officer typically lived at the main building at Fort Johnston.

National Register of Historic Places listings in Brunswick County, North Carolina, added Fort Johnston on 7 June 1974.

== Decommissioning ==
After 2004, the Army declared Fort Johnston surplus and ceased operations, independent of the Base Realignment and Closure process. North Carolina Maritime Museum at Southport opened on the former fort property.
