= John Powell Taylor =

American military officer and politician

Col. John Powell Taylor
- John Powell Taylor signed Banknote from 1779

Representative to the North Carolina Provincial Congress for Granville County
- In office 1776–1776

Personal details
- Born: 18 November 1696 Hare Forest Plantation, Province of Virginia, Colonial North America
- Died: 22 March 1780 (aged 83) Townsville, Granville County, North Carolina, United States
- Party: Patriot (American Revolution)
- Spouse: Catherine Pendleton (1699-1774)
- Children: 10, including Joseph Taylor (colonel)
- Occupation: Politician; Farmer; Military Officer

Military service
- Years of service: 1776-1780
- Rank: Lt. Colonel; Colonel
- Commands: Granville County Militia
- Battles/wars: American Revolutionary War

John Powell Taylor was a Virginia-born American politician and officer who served as a representative to the North Carolina Provincial Congress and also worked financing the American Revolution in North Carolina and supplying the local soldiers with provisions. He was a community leader and early settler of the Province of North Carolina, being the progenitor of many hundreds of descendants. His 4th great-granddaughter is Elizabeth Taylor.

== Early life and family ==
John Powell Taylor was born to Col. James Taylor (1633–1698) and Mary Gregory (1665–1698) in Virginia. His maternal great-grandfather was Sir Rodger Gregory (1571–1629).

== American Revolution ==
In 1776, Taylor represented Granville County, in the North Carolina Provincial Congress. A lieutenant colonel in the Granville County Regiment of Militia,, he took the Oath of Allegiance to the Patriot cause in 1778 and began co-signing bills of credit issued by the state to the fund the American Revolutionary War in 1779. In 1780 he supplied provision to the Continental forces, helping troops in North Carolina and being repaid for it by the state.

== Death ==
Taylor died in 1780 at aged 83.
