= William Henry Hill (North Carolina politician) =

American politician

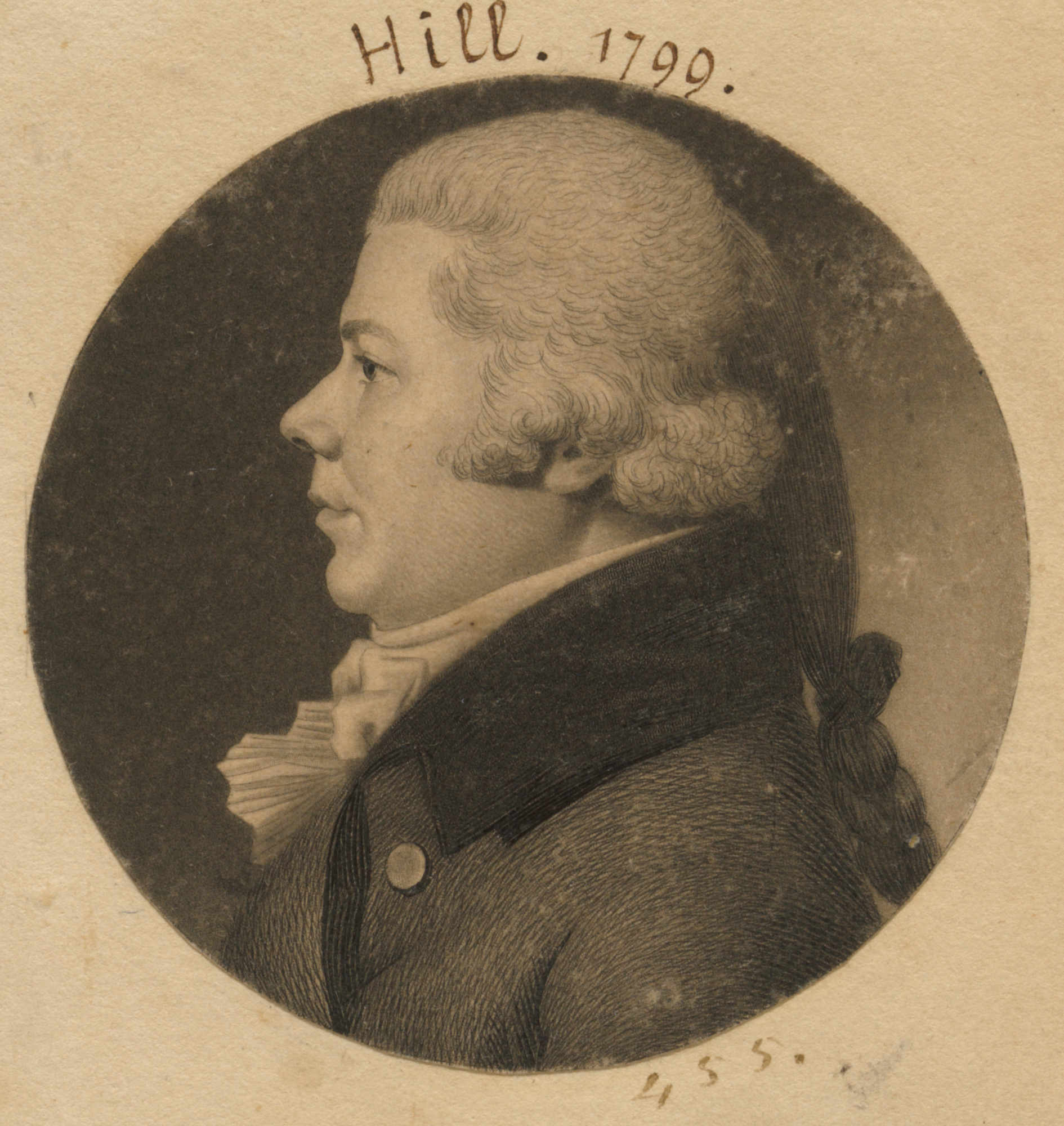
- Portrait of Hill in 1799

Member of the U.S. House of Representatives from North Carolina's 6th district
- In office March 4, 1799 – March 3, 1803
- Preceded by: James Gillespie
- Succeeded by: Nathaniel Macon

Personal details
- Born: May 1, 1767 Brunswick Town, North Carolina, British America
- Died: December 9, 1808 (aged 41) Wilmington, North Carolina, U.S.
- Party: Federalist

William Henry Hill (May 1, 1767 – December 9, 1808) was a Congressional representative from North Carolina; born in Brunswick Town, Brunswick County, North Carolina; attended the public schools in Boston, Massachusetts; engaged in agricultural pursuits; studied law in Boston; was admitted to the bar and practiced; appointed United States district attorney for North Carolina by President George Washington in 1790; member of the State senate in 1794; elected as a Federalist to the Sixth and Seventh Congresses (March 4, 1799 – March 3, 1803); appointed judge of the United States District Court for the District of North Carolina by President John Adams at the close of his term but the designation was withdrawn by President Thomas Jefferson; returned to his estate near Wilmington, North Carolina, where he engaged in agricultural pursuits until his death there in 1808; interment in the family burial ground on his estate, "Hilton," near Wilmington.

== See also ==
- Sixth United States Congress
- Seventh United States Congress

U.S. House of Representatives
Preceded by James Gillespie	Member of the U.S. House of Representatives from North Carolina's 6th congressional district 1799–1803	Succeeded by Nathaniel Macon
