= Brier Creek (Savannah River tributary) =

Coordinates: 32.78294°N 81.43261°W

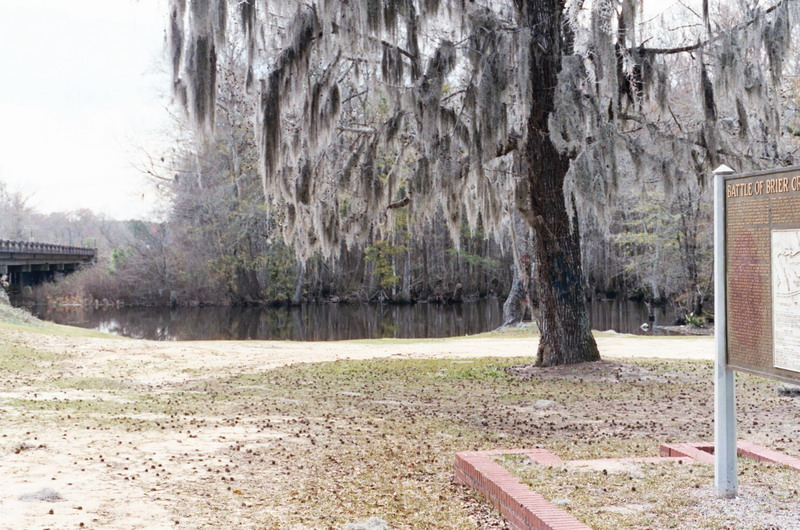
- Brier Creek, site of the Revolutionary War Battle

Location
- Country: United States

Physical characteristics
- Source
  - location: Georgia

Brier Creek or Briar Creek is a 123-mile-long (198 km) tributary of the Savannah River in the U.S. state of Georgia. It rises in Warren County east of Camak and flows southeast to the Savannah River in Screven County, 12 miles (19 km) east of Sylvania.

The stream's name comes from the Native Americans of the area, who encountered briers along its course.

== Crossings ==
- Brannens Bridge Crossing
- Jp Crossing
- US 301 / SR 73
- Millhaven Crossing
- SR 23
- SR 56 / SR 80
- US 25 / SR 121
- SR 88
- US 1 / SR 4
- US 221 / SR 47
- SR 17
- SR 278 / SR 12

== See also ==
- List of rivers of Georgia
- Battle of Brier Creek
