= Battle of Myhand's Bridge =

Skirmish in North Carolina during the American Revolution

Coordinates: 35.00°N 78.37°W

- Part of the American Revolutionary War
| Date | May 13, 1781 |
| Location | Near Clinton, Sampson County, North Carolina |
| Result | Patriot victory |

Belligerents
| (Kingdom of Great Britain) Loyalist militia | (United States) Patriot militia |

Commanders and leaders
| (Kingdom of Great Britain) Capt. Middleton Mobley (Kingdom of Great Britain) Capt. Roger Cross (DOW) | (United States) Col. James Kenan (United States) Capt. John C. "Shay" Williams |

Strength
| 120 | 75 |

Casualties and losses
| 3 killed 2 wounded 1 mortally wounded 10 captured | 1 killed Unknown wounded |

The battle of Myhand's bridge took place on May 13, 1781, was fought between Patriot and Loyalist militia near Clinton, North Carolina. Colonel James Kenan lost his brother at a skirmish in Cohera swamp and from then on he kept his sight on the Loyalist camp of Captain Middleton Mobley. Col. Kenan had waited for reinforcements with a swivel gun to arrive from the ferry at the fort at Helltown but realized that they likely wouldn't make it before Captain Mobley would increase his army.

On May 13, James Kenan along with John C. “Shay” Williams attacked the Loyalist camp in the early morning. The Patriot forces drew the Loyalists out of their encampment and as the day progressed the Patriots enveloped the Loyalists. Seeing that they were being fired upon from every corner, the Loyalists managed to break out and retreated down the Little Coharie creek, leaving behind 3 killed, 2 seriously wounded and 10 captured. The Patriots only suffered one fatality, a non combat death where a soldier was bitten multiple times by a venomous snake.
