= Col. Richard P. Taylor House =

Historic house in North Carolina, United States

- U.S. National Register of Historic Places
- U.S. Historic district
- Location within North Carolina Location within the United States
- Location: NC 1524, near Huntsboro, North Carolina
- Coordinates: 36°20′09″N 78°32′20″W
- Area: 10 acres (4.0 ha)
- Built: 1835
- Architectural style: Greek Revival, Federal
- MPS: Granville County MPS
- NRHP reference No.: 88000414
- Added to NRHP: April 28, 1988

Col. Richard P. Taylor House is a historic plantation complex and national historic district located near Huntsboro, Granville County, North Carolina. The plantation house was built about 1835, and is a tall two-story, five-bay, transitional Federal / Greek Revival style frame dwelling. It has a one-story rear ell, exterior end chimneys, and a full-height brick basement. The house is nearly identical to that built by Col. Richard Taylor's half-brother, the Archibald Taylor Plantation House. Also on the property are the contributing early mortise and tenon smokehouse, a pigeon house or tobacco packhouse, an air-cure tobacco barn, a frame corn crib, and two log tobacco barns.

It was listed on the National Register of Historic Places in 1988.
