= Battle of Portevent's Mill =

Skirmish in North Carolina during the American Revolution

Battle of Portevent’s Mill
- Part of the American Revolutionary War
Date	May 16, 1781
Location	Near present-day Garland, North Carolina
Result	Patriot victory.

Belligerents
(Kingdom of Great Britain) Loyalist militia	(United States) Patriot militia

Commanders and leaders
(Kingdom of Great Britain) Cap. Middleton Mobley	(United States) Col. James Kenan

Strength
100	75

Casualties and losses
12 killed 4 wounded 12 captured	3 killed 3 wounded

The Battle of Portevent’s Mill was fought between Patriot militia and Loyalist militia near present day Garland, North Carolina in Sampson County, on May 16, 1781 during the American War of Independence

Patriot scouts were combing the area and discovered Loyalist soldiers under the command of Captain Middleton Mobley encamped at Portevent’s Mill grinding corn. They returned to their commander, Colonel James Kenan, and had informed him of their discovery. The Patriots would launch a surprise attack at the Loyalist encampment and after intense fighting the Loyalists would eventually retreat into Black Swamp.
