= Archibald Taylor Plantation House =

Historic house in North Carolina, United States

- U.S. National Register of Historic Places
- Location within North Carolina Location within the United States
- Location: 5632 Tabbs Creek Rd., near Oxford, North Carolina
- Coordinates: 36°19′18″N 78°32′31″W
- Area: 10 acres (4.0 ha)
- Built: 1840
- Architectural style: Federal, Greek Revival
- MPS: Granville County MPS
- NRHP reference No.: 01001132
- Added to NRHP: October 20, 2001

Archibald Taylor Plantation House is a historic plantation house located near Oxford, Granville County, North Carolina. It was built about 1840, and is a tall two-story, five-bay, transitional Federal / Greek Revival style frame dwelling. It has a one-story rear ell, exterior end chimneys, and a full-height brick basement. The house is nearly identical to that built by Archibald Taylor's half-brother, the Col. Richard P. Taylor House.

It was listed on the National Register of Historic Places in 2001.
