= Battle of Rockfish =

Battle during American revolutionary war

- Part of American Revolutionary War
Date	August, 2. 1781
Location	Rockfish Creek, near present-day Duplin County, North Carolina, United States 34.7179°N 77.9818°W
Result	British victory

Belligerents
(United States) American revolutionaries in North Carolina	(Kingdom of Great Britain) Great Britain

Commanders and leaders
(United States) Brigadier General James Kenan (United States) Brigadier General William Caswell	(Kingdom of Great Britain) Major James H. Craig (Kingdom of Great Britain) Captain John Gordon

Units involved
(United States) Duplin County militia (United States) Caswell's militia	(Kingdom of Great Britain) 82nd Regiment of Foot (Kingdom of Great Britain) Royal Regiment of Artillery (Kingdom of Great Britain) Gordon's independent Dragoons

Strength
330 men	325 men

Casualties and losses
60 killed 30 captured	Unknown
- Location within North Carolina

The Battle of Rockfish was a minor conflict of the American Revolutionary War fought about one mile south of the present town of Wallace in Duplin County on August 2, 1781

== Background ==
On January 28 of 1781, a British lead force under James H. Craig captured Wilmington, North Carolina. They used it as a base from which they forayed the countryside, arresting wings and enlisting local Loyalists. In the early summer of 1781, Craig issued a proclamation that all men in the surrounding area were British subjects, and consequentially must enrol in the Loyalist militia. He stated that those who did not do so by August 1 would be harassed and have their property seized and sold.

== Battle ==
On August 2, 1781, James H. Craig led his men into the countryside.

At the same time, American forces consisting of Brigadier General James Kenan and the Duplin County militia were lying in wait behind breastworks erected along Rockfish Creek. Just before the fight, Brigadier General William Caswell's militia arrived and reinforced the American forces.

When Craig and his men arrived, there was a brief and intense confrontation between the forces. This lasted until the Americans ran out of ammunition and British artillery forces arrived, causing the Americans to withdraw. Major Craig's cavalry charged and the Americans ran. Captain John Gordon's dragoons ran the Americans down and took thirty prisoners.

== Aftermath ==
Major James H. Craig remained in Duplin County and burned down the homes of people who would not take the Oath of Allegiance to the British.
