= Fayetteville Convention =

North Carolina ratification, U.S. Constitution

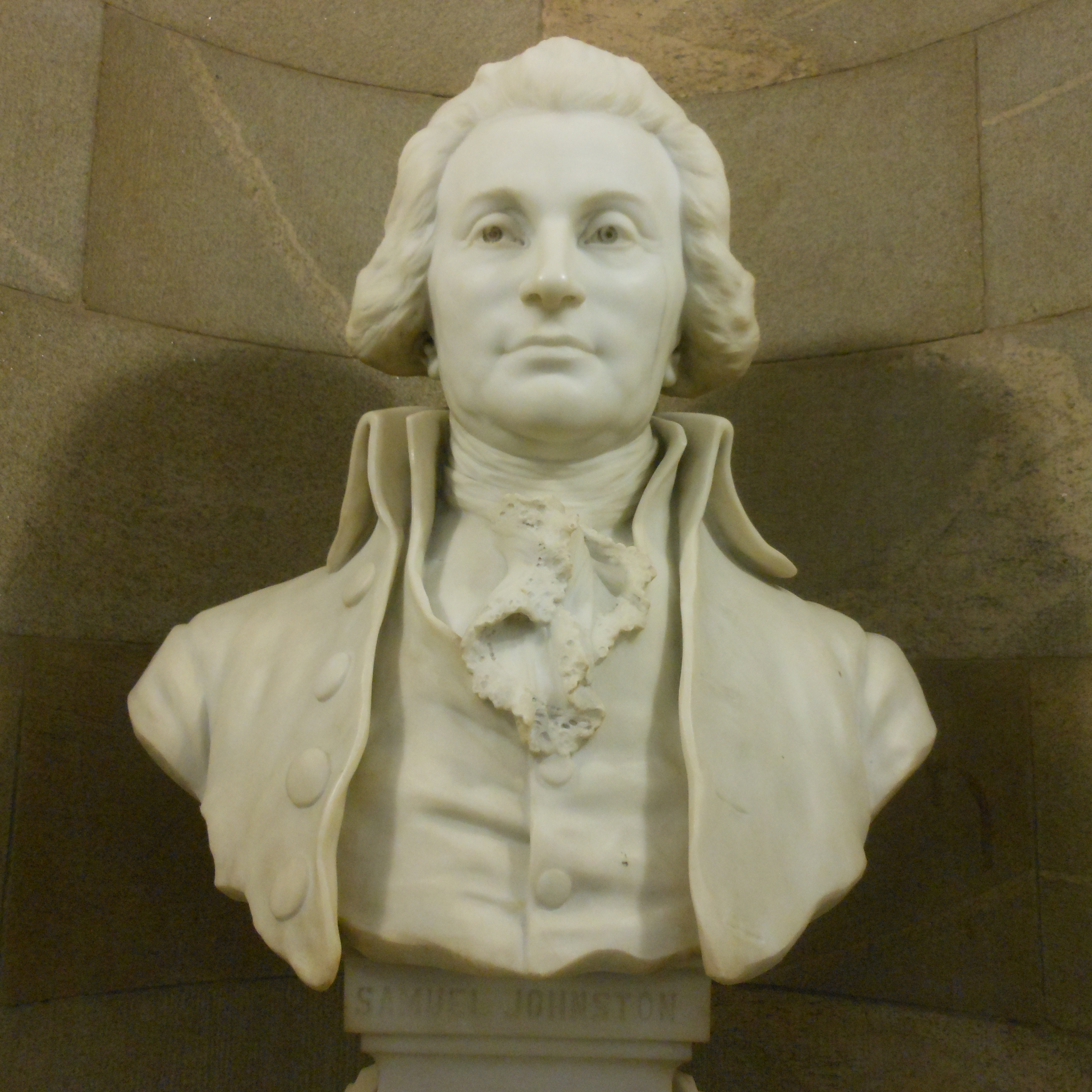
Governor Samuel Johnston presided over the Convention

The Fayetteville Convention was a meeting by 271 delegates from North Carolina to ratify the US Constitution. Governor Samuel Johnston presided over the convention, which met in Fayetteville, North Carolina, from November 16 to 23, 1789 to debate on and decide on the ratification of the Constitution, which had recommended to the states by the Philadelphia Convention during the summer of 1787. The delegates ratified the Constitution by a vote of 194 to 77, thus making North Carolina the 12th state to ratify the constitution.

== Location ==
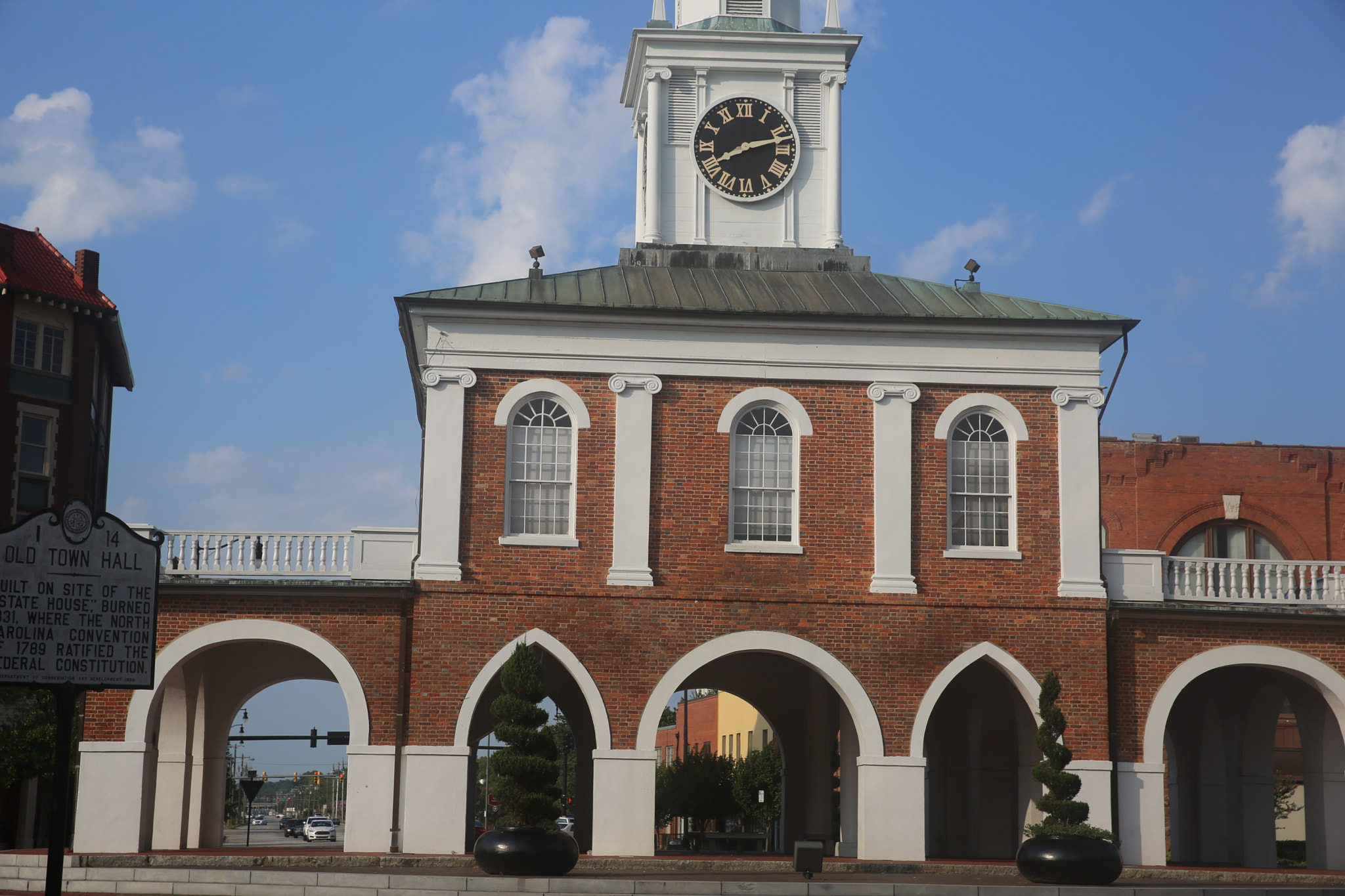
Market House, on site of the State House in Fayetteville

The Fayetteville Convention was held at the State House in Fayetteville, a large building constructed in 1788 in anticipation of the town becoming the capital of North Carolina. Although the North Carolina General Assembly met there in 1789, 1790 and 1793, the capital moved permanently to Raleigh in 1794. The State House, along with most of Fayetteville, was destroyed by a large fire in 1831. The Market House was built on the site in 1832.

== Proceedings ==
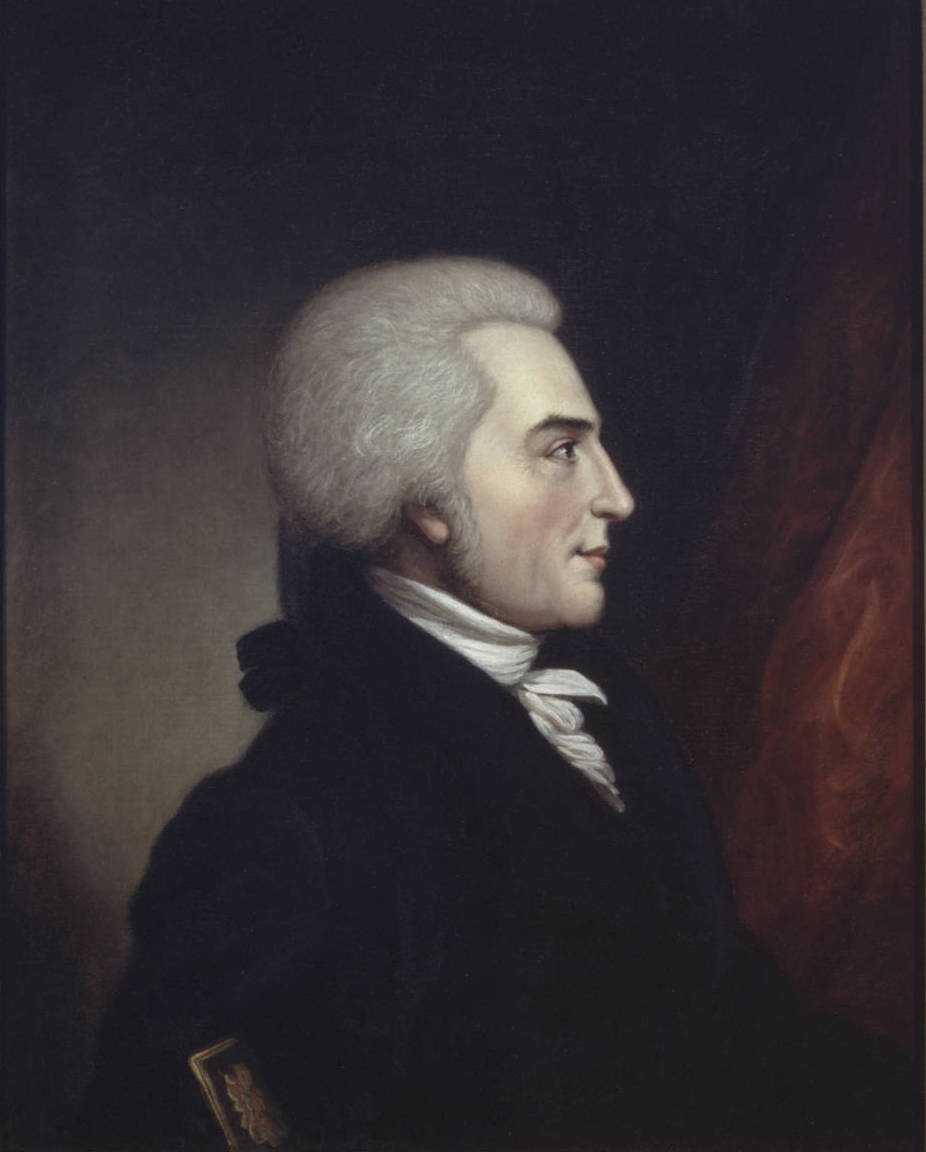
William Richardson Davie, Town of Halifax delegate

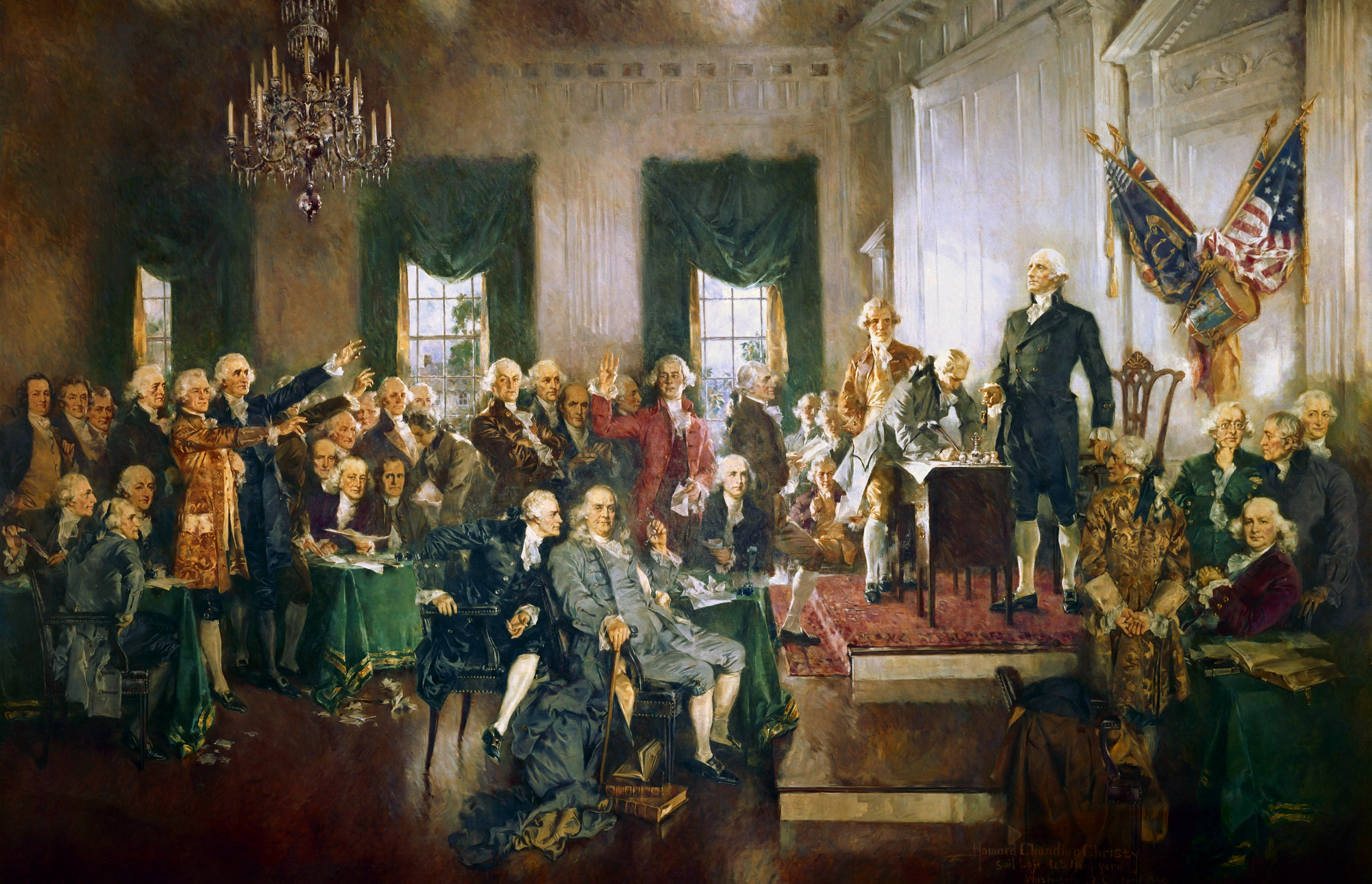
Scene at the signing of the Constitution of the United States. Signing is Richard Dobbs Spaight, and behind him is William Blount and Hugh Williamson.

The prior Hillsborough Convention had decided neither to ratify or to reject the Constitution. The Federalists waged a successful campaign in the 1789 elections, which resulted in Anti-Federalists receiving less than one third of the 272 seats at the Fayetteville Convention. One factor leading to the Federalist majority was the election of George Washington as president and the resulting stable government, which dispelled Anti-Federalists' fears about unbridled federal power. Influential Federalists controlled most of the North Carolina newspapers and used them to vigorously support ratification of the Constitution to the demise of Anti-Federalists. The introduction of the Bill of Rights also helped to neutralize the Ant-Federalists' objections. Thus, when the Fayetteville Convention opened on November 16, the outcome for ratification of the Constitution had been almost assured.

As a final compromise, the delegates agreed to present to Congress eight amendments not covered by the proposed Bill of Rights. They included issues such as limits on congressional taxing power and on the enlistment terms for soldiers. On November 20, William Richardson Davie brought the ratification question to the convention, which it approved with a vote of 195 to 77. As a result, North Carolina became the twelfth state to approve the U.S. Constitution. After the vote, John Huske of Wilmington led a walkout of 68 Anti-Federalists from the chambers. The convention was adjourned on November 23.

The following amendments proposed by James Galloway were unanimously approved by the convention on November 23:

1. "That Congress shall not alter, modify, or interfere in the times, places and manner of holding elections for Senators and Representatives, or either of them, except when the Legislature of any State shall neglect, refuse, or be disabled by invasion or rebellion to prescribe the same, or in case when the provision made by the State is so imperfect as that no consequent election is had."
2. "That Congress shall not, directly or indirectly, either by themselves or through the Judiciary, interfere with any one of the States in the redemption of paper money already emitted and now in circulation, or in liquidating and discharging the public securities of any one of the States; but each and every State shall have the exclusive right of making such laws and regulations for the above purposes, as they shall think proper."
3. "That the members of the Senate and House of Representatives shall be ineligible to and incapable of holding any civil office under the authority of the United States during the time for which they shall respectively be elected."
4. "That the journals of the proceedings of the Senate and House of Representatives shall be published at least once in every year, except such parts thereof relating to treaties, alliances, or military operations, as in their judgment require secrecy."
5. "That a regular statement and account of the receipts and expenditures of all public monies shall be published at least once in every year."
6. "That no navigation law, or law regulating commerce, shall be passed, without the consent of two-thirds of the members present in both Houses."
7. "That no soldier shall be enlisted for any longer term than four years, except in time of war, and then for no longer term than the continuance of the war."
8. "That some tribunal, other than the Senate, be provided for trying impeachments of Senators."

== Delegates ==
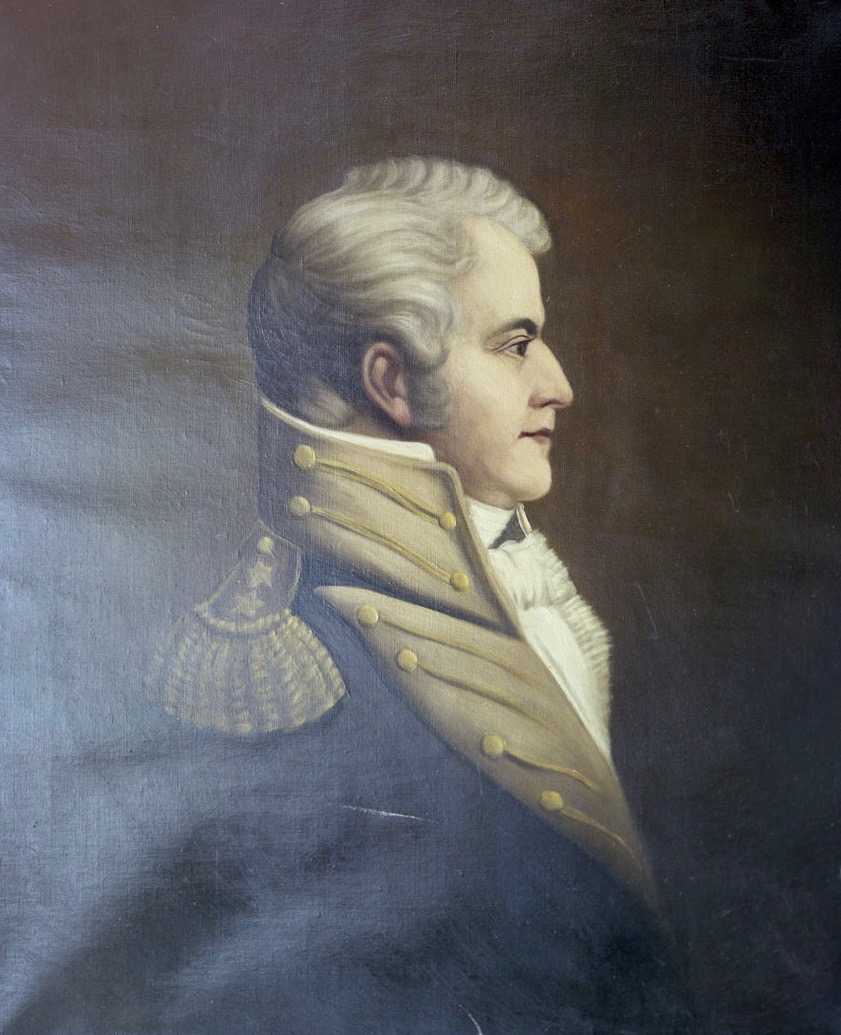
later Gov. Benjamin Smith, Brunswick delegate

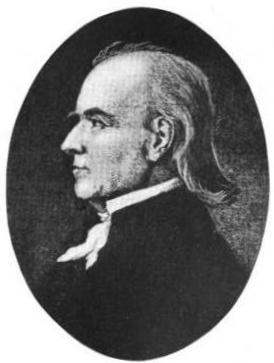
William Lenoir, Wilkes delegate

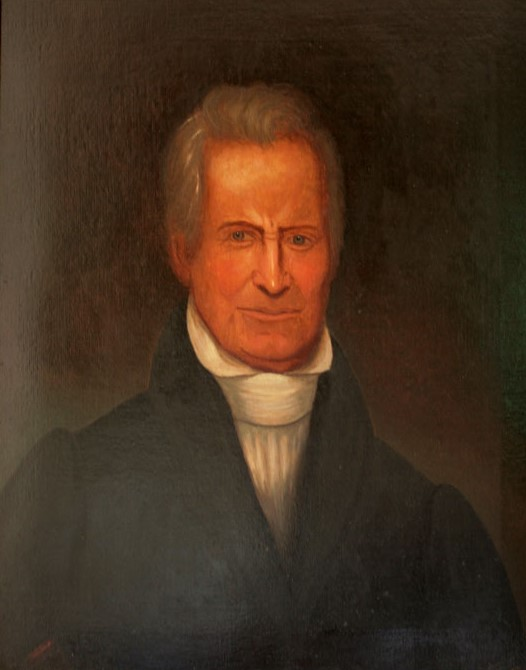
Joseph Graham, Mecklenburg delegate

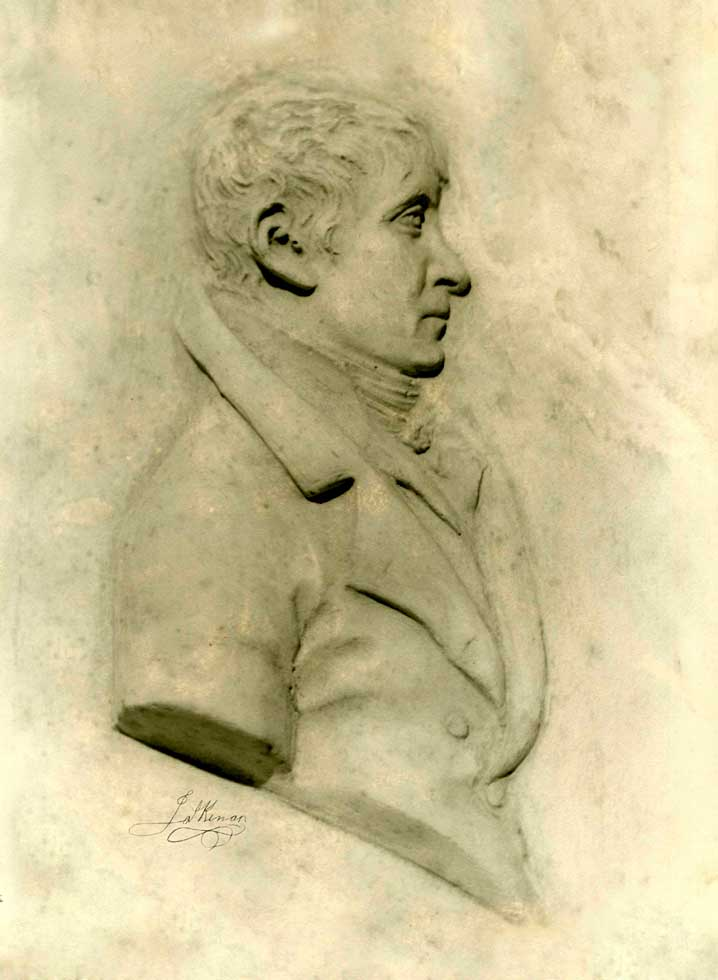
James Kenan, Duplin delegate

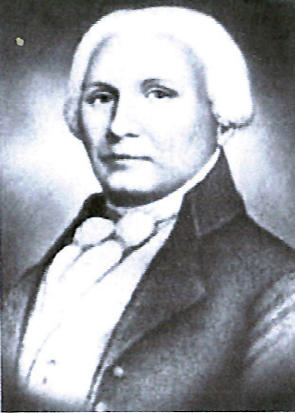
Joseph McDowell Jr, Burke delegate

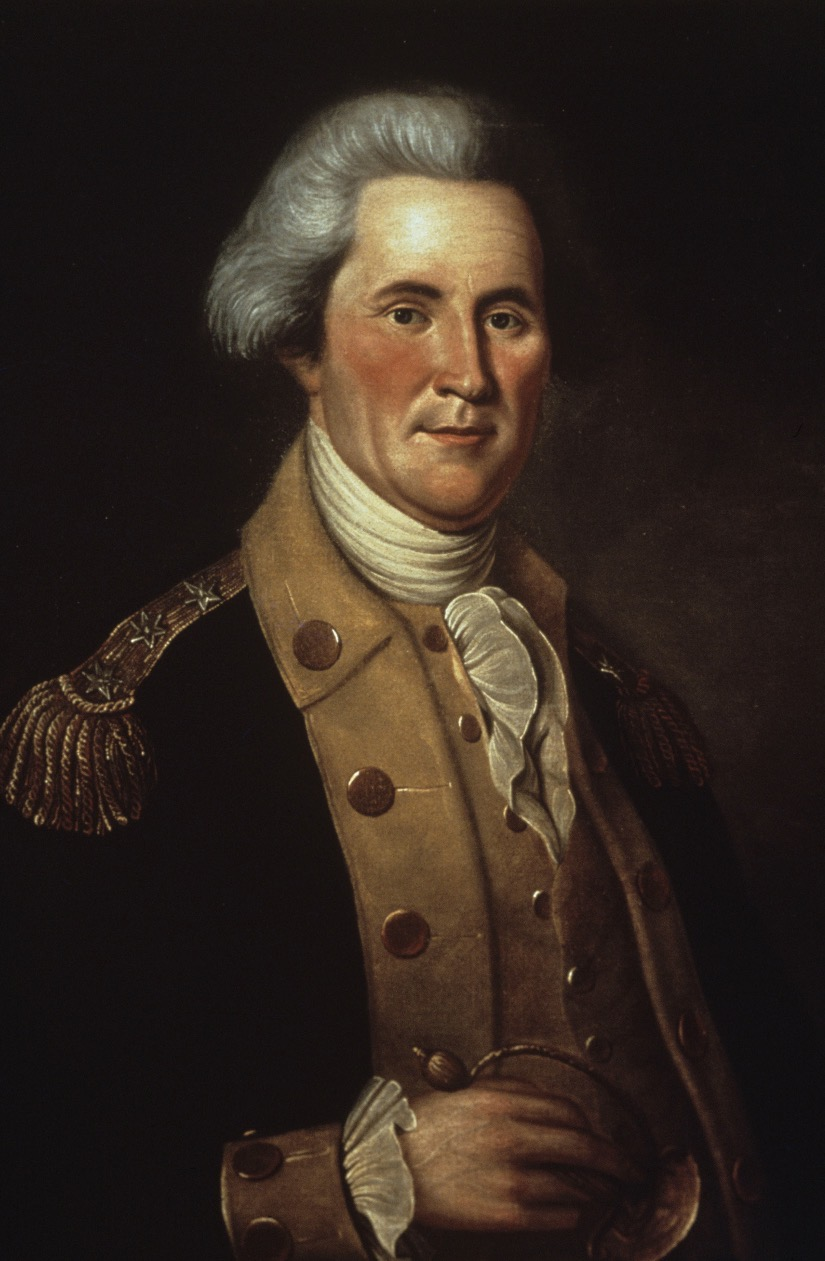
John Sevier, Greene delegate

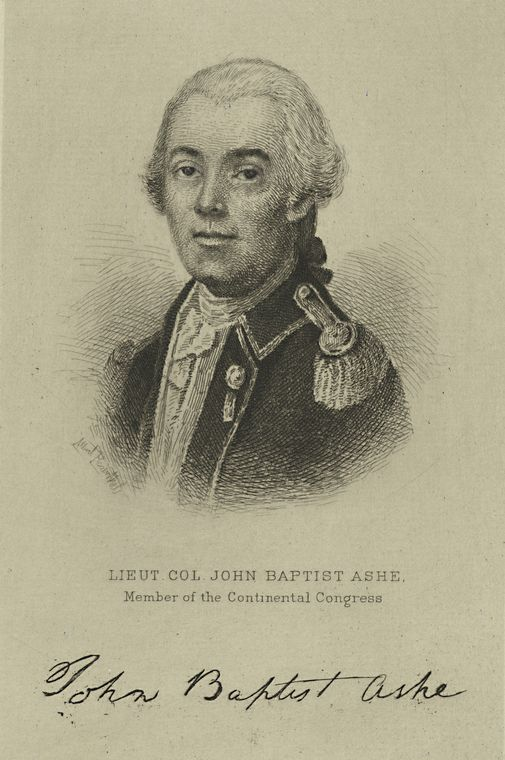
John Baptista Ashe, Halifax delegate

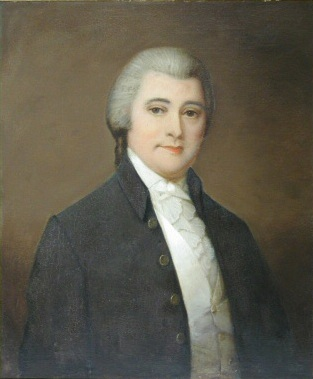
William Blount, Pitt delegate

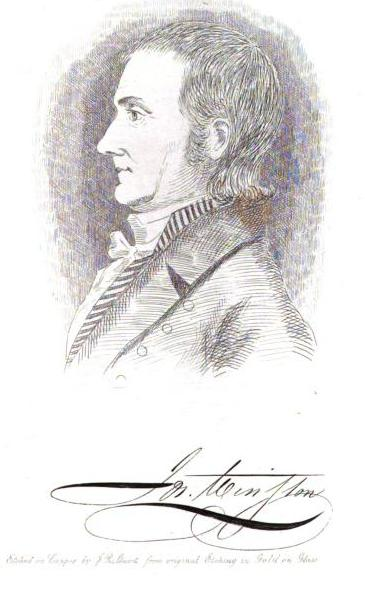
Joseph Winston, Surry delegate

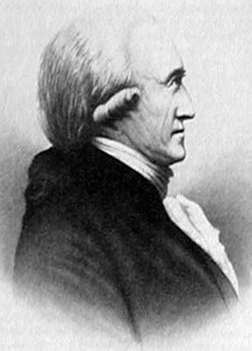
Benjamin Hawkins, Warren delegate

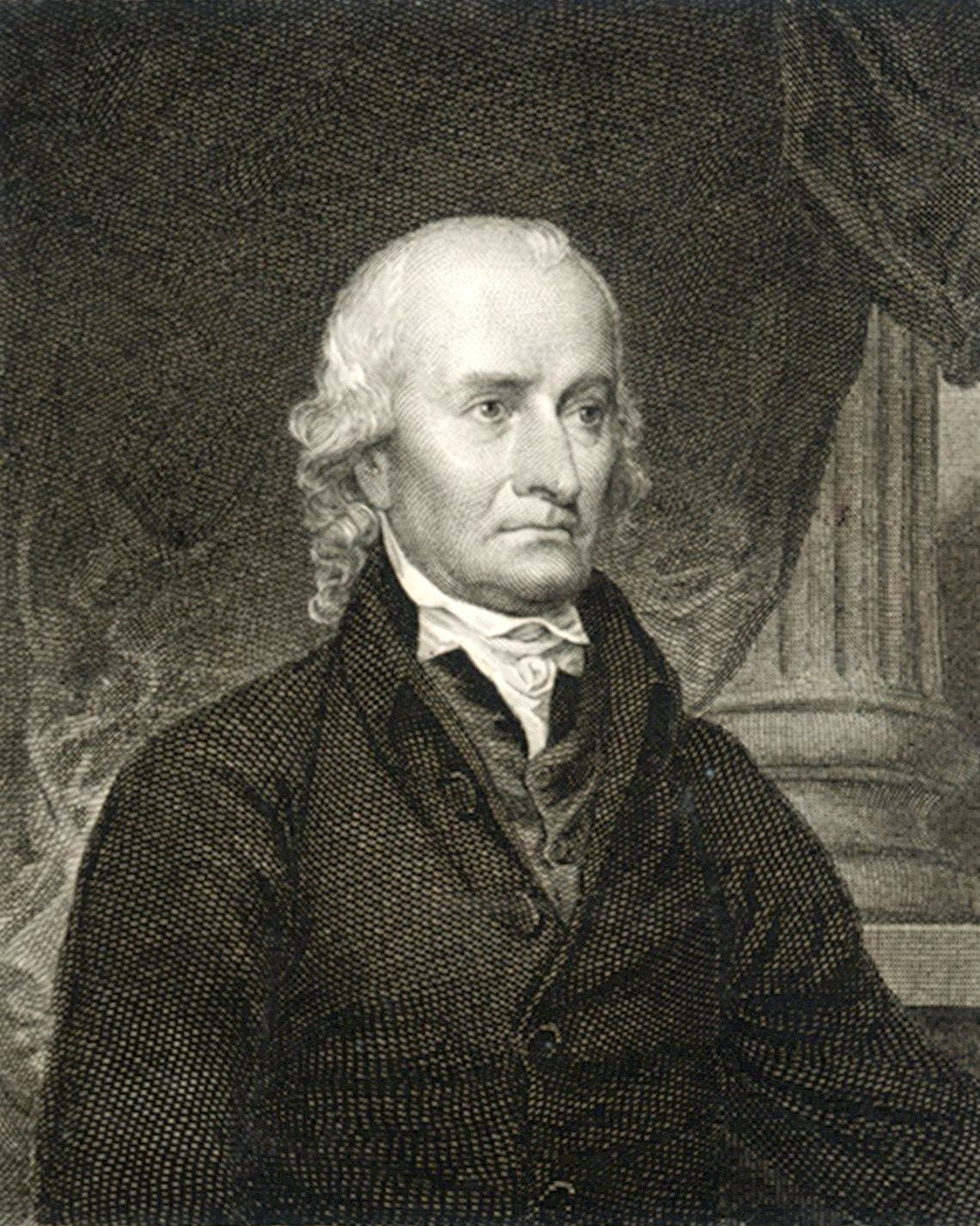
Hugh Williamson, Tyrrell delegate and signer of the Constitution

There were 271 delegates from 61 counties and six cities/districts of North Carolina. Some counties later became part of the state of Tennessee in 1796. Governor Samuel Johnston from Perquimans County presiding over the convention. Charles Johnson from Chowan County was the vice-president of the convention. John Hunt and James Taylor were appointed as secretary and assistant secretary, respectively, of the convention. Peter Gooding, James Mulloy, William Murphy, and Nicholas Murphey were appointed as doorkeepers of the convention.

County/City	Delegate	Vote (Yea/Nay)
Anson County	The Hon. Samuel Spencer	Nay
Anson County	Jesse Gilbert	Yea
Anson County	Pleasant May	Nay
Anson County	Thomas Wade	Yea
Anson County	David Jameson	Yea
Beaufort County	John G. Blount	Yea
Beaufort County	William Brown	Yea
Beaufort County	Richard Grist	Yea
Beaufort County	Alderson Ellison	Yea
Beaufort County	Silas W. Arnett	Yea
Bertie County	John Johnston	Yea
Bertie County	Francis Pugh	Yea
Bertie County	William Johnston Dawson	Yea
Bertie County	David Turner	Yea
Bertie County	David Stone	Yea
Brunswick County	Benjamin Smith	Yea
Brunswick County	William E. Lord	Nay
Brunswick County	William Gause	Yea
Brunswick County	John Hall	Yea
Brunswick County	Dennis Hawkins	Yea
Bladen County	John Cowan	Yea
Bladen County	Thomas Owen	Yea
Bladen County	Joseph Gaitier	Nay
Bladen County	Thomas Brown	Nay
Bladen County	Duncan Stewart	Nay
Burke County	Charles McDowall	Yea
Burke County	Joseph McDowall	Nay
Burke County	Joseph McDowall, Jun.	Yea
Burke County	William E. Erwin	Yea
Burke County	John Carson	Yea
Craven County	Joseph McDowall, Jun.	Yea
Craven County	John Allen	Yea
Craven County	Richard Nixon	Yea
Craven County	Joseph Leech	Yea
Craven County	Thomas Williams	Nay
Cumberland County	John Ingram	Yea
Cumberland County	John Hay	Yea
Cumberland County	William B. Grove	Yea
Cumberland County	James Moore	Nay
Cumberland County	Robert Adam	Yea
Carteret County	John Easton	Yea
Carteret County	Malachi Bell	Yea
Carteret County	John Fulford	Yea
Carteret County	Wallace Styron	Yea
Carteret County	John Wallace	Yea
Currituck County	William Ferebee	Yea
Currituck County	Thomas P. Williams	Yea
Currituck County	Samuel Ferebee	Yea
Currituck County	Andrew Duke	Yea
Currituck County	Spence Hall	Yea
Chowan County	Stephen Cabarrus	Yea
Chowan County	Charles Johnson	Yea
Chowan County	Lemuel Creecy	Yea
Chowan County	Edmund Blount	Yea
Chowan County	William Righton (late attendee)	Yea
Camden County	Isaac Gregory	Yea
Camden County	Peter Dauge	Yea
Camden County	Enoch Sawyer	Yea
Camden County	Henry Abbott	Yea
Camden County	Charles Grandy	Yea
Caswell County	John Wommack	Nay
Caswell County	Robert Dickens	Nay
Caswell County	John Graves	Nay
Caswell County	Robert Payne	Yea
Caswell County	Robert Bowman	Yea
Chatham County	Robert Edwards	Nay
Chatham County	William Vestall	Yea
Chatham County	John Thompson	Yea
Chatham County	John Ramsay	Yea
Chatham County	James Anderson	Yea
Dobbs County	Benjamin Sheppard	Yea
Dobbs County	Nathan Lassiter	Yea
Dobbs County	Simeon Bright (late attendee)	Yea
Duplin County	James Pearsall	Nay
Duplin County	James Gillespie	Nay
Duplin County	Robert Dickson	Nay
Duplin County	Lavan Watkins	Nay
Duplin County	James Kenan	Nay
Davidson County (became part of Tennessee in 1796)	Charles Gerrard	Yea
Davidson County	Joel Rice	Yea
Davidson County	Robert Ewing	Yea
Davidson County	James C. Mountflorence	Yea
Davidson County	William Dobbin	Yea
Edgecombe County	Etheldred Phillips	Yea
Edgecombe County	Thomas Blount	Yea
Edgecombe County	Jeremiah Hilliard	Yea
Edgecombe County	Etheldred Gray	Yea
Edgecombe County	William Fort	Yea
Franklin County	Henry Hill	Nay
Franklin County	Thomas Sherrod	Yea
Franklin County	Jordan Hill	Yea
Franklin County	William Lancaster	Yea
Franklin County	William Christmas	Yea
Guilford County	John Hamilton	Nay
Guilford County	William Gowdy	Nay
Guilford County	Richard D. Caldwell	Nay
Guilford County	Daniel Gillespie	Nay
Granville County	Elijah Mitchell	Nay
Granville County	Thomas Person	Nay
Granville County	Thorton Yancey	Nay
Granville County	Peter Bennett	Nay
Granville County	Edmund Taylor Jr.	Nay
Gates County	David Rice	Yea
Gates County	Joseph Riddick	Yea
Gates County	John Baker	Yea
Greene County (became part of Tennessee in 1796)	John Sevier	Yea
Greene County	Alexander Outlaw	Yea
Greene County	John Allison	Yea
Greene County	George Doherty	Yea
Greene County	James Wilson	Yea
Halifax County	Lunsford Long	Yea
Halifax County	John Baptista Ashe	Yea
Halifax County	Peter Qualls	Yea
Halifax County	John Whitaker	Yea
Halifax County	Marmaduke Norfleet	Yea
Hertford County	Thomas Wynns	Yea
Hertford County	Robert Montgomery	Yea
Hertford County	Hardy Murfee	Yea
Hertford County	Henry Hill	Yea
Hertford County	Henry Baker	Yea
Hyde County	John Eborn	Yea
Hyde County	James Watson	Yea
Hyde County	John Anderson	Yea
Hyde County	James Jasper	Yea
Hyde County	Michael Peters	Yea
Hawkins County (became part of Tennessee in 1789)	Nathaniel Henderson	Yea
Hawkins County	James White	Yea
Hawkins County	John Hunt	Yea
Hawkins County	Elijah Chessen (late attendee)	Yea
Iredell County	Adlai Osborne	Yea
Iredell County	Adam Brevard	Yea
Iredell County	Musentine Matthews	Yea
Iredell County	John Nesbitt (Nisbet)	Yea
Iredell County	David Caldwell	Yea
Johnston County	Samuel Smith	Yea
Johnston County	Hardy Bryan	Yea
Johnston County	William Bridgers	Yea
Johnston County	William Hackney	Yea
Johnston County	Matthias Handy	Yea
Jones County	Frederick Hargett	Yea
Jones County	Edward Whitty	Yea
Jones County	John H. Bryan	Yea
Jones County	Jacob Johnston	Yea
Lincoln County	Joseph Dickson	Yea
Lincoln County	John Moore	Yea
Lincoln County	William MacLaine	Yea
Lincoln County	Robert Alexander	Nay
Lincoln County	John Caruth	Yea
Moore County	William Martin	Nay
Moore County	Thomas Tyson	Yea
Moore County	Donald MacIntosh	Nay
Moore County	Neill McLeod	Nay
Moore County	Cornelius Doud (late attendee)	Nay
Martin County	John Stewart	Yea
Martin County	William Williams	Yea
Martin County	Nathan Mayo	Yea
Martin County	Thomas Hunter (late attendee)	Yea
Mecklenburg County	Zachias Wilson	Nay
Mecklenburg County	Joseph Douglass	Nay
Mecklenburg County	Caleb Phifer	Nay
Mecklenburg County	Joseph Graham	Nay
Mecklenburg County	James Porter	Nay
Montgomery County	William Johnston	Yea
Montgomery County	James Turner	Yea
Montgomery County	James Tindall	Yea
Montgomery County	David Nesbitt	Yea
Montgomery County	James Crump	Yea
Northampton County	John M. Benford	Yea
Northampton County	Halcott B. Pride	Nay
Northampton County	Samuel Tarver	Yea
Northampton County	Robert Peebles	Nay
Northampton County	Samuel Peete	Yea
New Hanover County	Timothy Bloodworth	Nay
New Hanover County	John G. Scull	Nay
New Hanover County	John Huske	Nay
New Hanover County	John A. Campbell	Nay
Nash County	Howell Ellin	Yea
Nash County	Wilson Vick	Yea
Nash County	William S. Marnes	Yea
Nash County	John Bonds	Yea
Nash County	Hardy Griffin	Yea
Onslow County	Robert W. Sneed	Yea
Onslow County	John Spicer	Yea
Onslow County	Daniel Yates	Yea
Onslow County	George Mitchell	Yea
Onslow County	Edward Ward	Yea
Orange County	James Christmass	Yea
Orange County	Thomas H. Perkins	Nay
Orange County	William F. Strudwick	Nay
Orange County	Joseph Hodge	Nay
Orange County	Alexander Mebane	Nay
Pasquotank County	Edward Everegain	Yea
Pasquotank County	John Swan	Yea
Pasquotank County	Thomas Banks	Yea
Pasquotank County	Devotion Davis	Yea
Perquimans County	His Excellency, Samuel Johnston	Yea
Perquimans County	John Skinner	Yea
Perquimans County	Joseph Harvey	Yea
Perquimans County	Benjamin Perry	Yea
Perquimans County	Asbury Sutton	Yea
Pitt County	William Blount	Yea
Pitt County	Shadrick Allen	Yea
Pitt County	James Armstrong	Yea
Pitt County	Samuel Simpson	Yea
Pitt County	Benjamin Bell	Yea
Rowan County	George H. Berger	Nay
Rowan County	Bazel Gaither	Yea
Rowan County	John Stokes	Yea
Rowan County	Maxwell Chambers	Yea
Rowan County	Matthew Lock	Nay
Randolph County	Zebedee Wood	Nay
Randolph County	Reuben Wood	Yea
Randolph County	Nathan Stedman	Yea
Randolph County	William Bailey (late attendee)	Yea
Richmond County	Edward Williams	Yea
Richmond County	Alexander Watson	Nay
Richmond County	William Robinson	Nay
Richmond County	Duncan M'Farland	Nay
Richmond County	Darby Harragan (late attendee)	Nay
Rutherford County	William Porter	Yea
Rutherford County	James Holland	Yea
Rutherford County	Richard Lewis	Yea
Rutherford County	William Johnson	Yea
Rockingham County	William Bethell	Nay
Rockingham County	James Gallaway	Nay
Rockingham County	Isaac Clarke	Nay
Rockingham County	Abram Phillips	Nay
Rockingham County	John Dabney	Nay
Robeson County	John Willis	Yea
Robeson County	Elias Barnes	Yea
Robeson County	Neill Brown	Yea
Robeson County	John Cade	Yea
Robeson County	Alford Sion	Yea
Surry County	Joseph Winston	Yea
Surry County	Gideon Edwards	Nay
Surry County	Absalom Bostwick	Nay
Surry County	Edward Lovell	Yea
Surry County	George Houser	Yea
Sullivan County (became part of Tennessee in 1796)	John Rhea	Yea
Sullivan County	William Nash	Nay
Sullivan County	John Scott	Nay
Sullivan County	Joseph Martin	Yea
Sampson County	Richard Clinton	Nay
Sampson County	James Spiller	Yea
Sampson County	James Thompson	Nay
Sampson County	Hardy Holmes	Nay
Sampson County	William King	Nay
Sumner County (became part of Tennessee in 1796)	Daniel Smith	Yea
Sumner County	David Wilson	Yea
Sumner County	Samuel Mason	Yea
Sumner County	Edward Douglass	Yea
Sumner County	John Overton	Yea
Tennessee County (became Montgomery County, Tennessee and Robertson County, Tennessee in 1796)	John Montgomery	Yea
Tennessee County	John Drew	Yea
Tennessee County	Thomas Johnston	Yea
Tennessee County	William Blount	Yea
Tennessee County	Benjamin Menees	Yea
Tyrrell County	Thomas Stewart	Yea
Tyrrell County	Hugh Williamson	Yea
Tyrrell County	Jeremiah Frazier	Yea
Tyrrell County	Simeon Spruill	Yea
Tyrrell County	Samuel Chesson	Yea
Washington County (became part of Tennessee in 1796)	Landon Carter	Yea
Washington County	Robert Love	Yea
Washington County	John Blair	Yea
Washington County	William Houston	yea
Washington County	Andrew Green	Yea
Warren County	Benjamin Hawkins	Yea
Warren County	Philemon Hawkins	Yea
Warren County	Solomon Green	Yea
Warren County	Wyatt Hawkins	Nay
Warren County	Thomas Christmass	Nay
Wayne County	Richard McKinnie	Yea
Wayne County	Burwell Mooring	Nay
Wayne County	David Cogdell	Nay
Wayne County	Josiah Jernigan	Yea
Wayne County	James Handley	Yea
Wake County	Joel Lane	Yea
Wake County	Thomas Hines	Yea
Wake County	Henry Lane	Yea
Wake County	Brittain Sanders	Nay
Wake County	William Hayes	Yea
Wilkes County	John Brown	Nay
Wilkes County	William Lenoir	Nay
Wilkes County	Joseph Herndon	Nay
Wilkes County	Benjamin Jones	Nay
Wilkes County	William Nall	Nay
Town of Salisbury	John Steele.	Yea
Town of Edenton	John Mare	Yea
Town of Hillsboro	Samuel Benton	Yea
Town of Newbern	Isaac Guion	Yea
Town of Halifax	William Richardson Davie.	Yea
Town of Wilmington	William N. Hill	Yea

== See also ==
- Hillsborough Convention
- History of the United States Constitution
- Market House (Fayetteville, North Carolina)
- Scene at the Signing of the Constitution of the United States, 1940 painting by Howard Chandler Christy, shows Richard Dobbs Spaight, William Blount, and Hugh Williamson of North Carolina at center stage
- Timeline of drafting and ratification of the United States Constitution
