= Hillsborough Convention =

Conference convened in North Carolina to ratify the United States Constitution

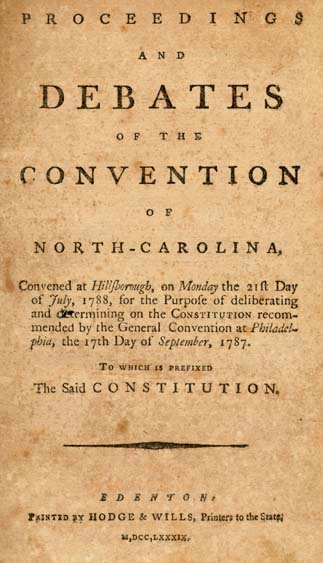
Proceedings and Debates of the Convention of North Carolina in 1788

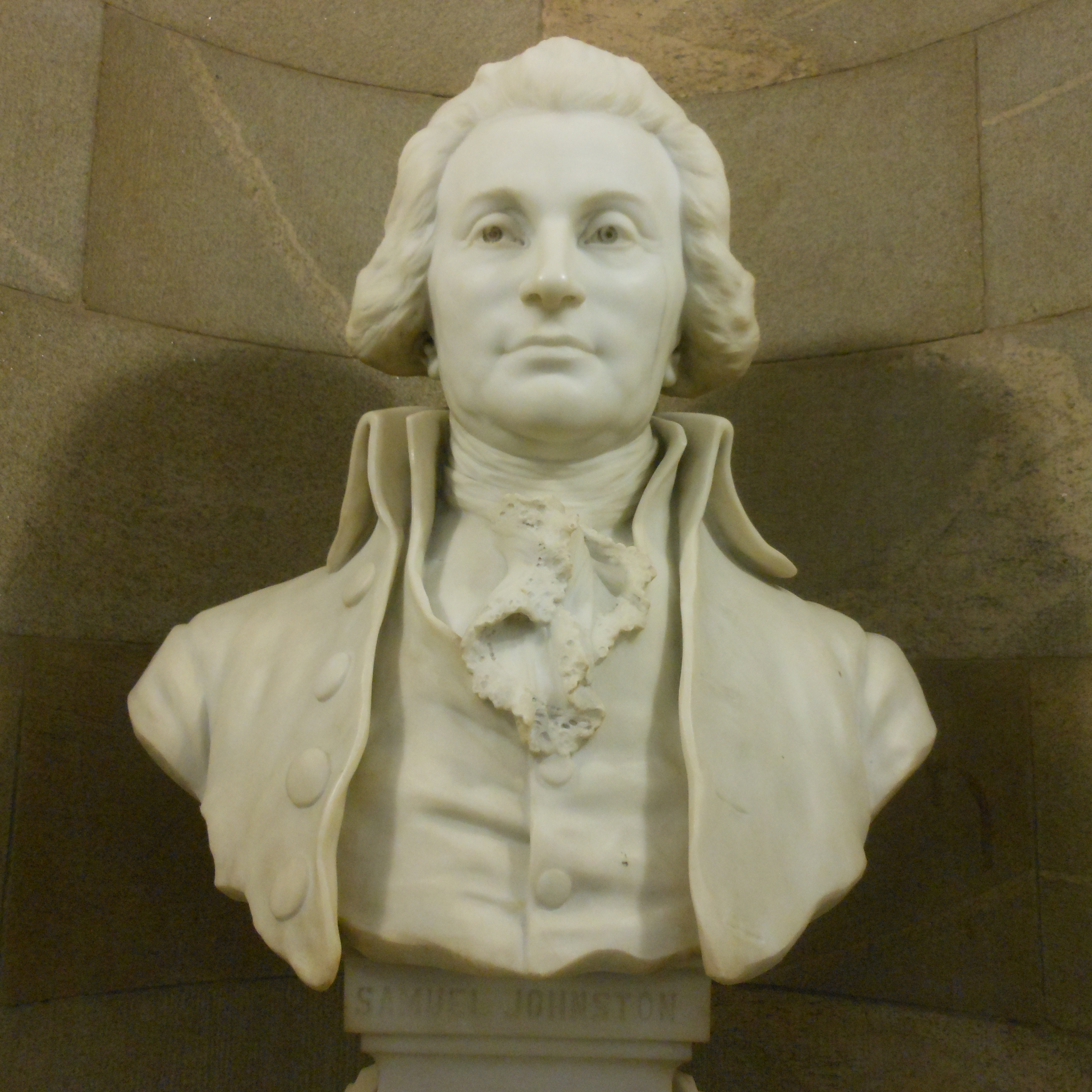
Governor Samuel Johnston presided

The Hillsborough Convention was the first of two North Carolina conventions to ratify the United States Constitution. Delegates represented 7 boroughs and 59 counties, including six western counties that became part of Tennessee when it was created in 1796. They met in Hillsborough, North Carolina from July 21 to August 4, 1788 to deliberate and determine whether to ratify the Constitution recommended to the states by the General Convention that had been held in Philadelphia the previous summer. The delegates had won their seats through special elections held in March 1788, as mandated by the North Carolina General Assembly. Governor Samuel Johnston presided over the Convention. The Hillsborough Convention was dominated by anti-Federalists, and North Carolina did not ratify the Constitution until the Fayetteville Convention, which met a year later.

== Location ==
The general convention was held at St. Matthew's Church, Hillsborough. The church building was located on Lot 98 in Hillsborough. It was also the location of the third Provincial Congress of North Carolina of 1775 and the meeting place of the North Carolina Legislature in 1778, 1782 and 1783. The church was destroyed by fire before 1800s. A new structure was built on the site in 1814 and became the Hillsborough Presbyterian Church in 1816.

== Division ==
Key state Federalists were James Iredell Sr., William Richardson Davie, and William Blount. Anti-Federalist leaders included Willie Jones, Samuel Spencer, and Timothy Bloodworth. The Anti-Federalist delegates outnumbered their Federalist colleagues by a margin of two to one. The Federalists wanted to strengthen the powers of the federal government to help the country keep from dissolving. They argued that the powers granted to the federal government in the Articles of Confederation were not sufficient. On the other side, the Anti-Federalists were suspicious of the federal government and did not want self-rule to come under fire from a government that could intrude on state and individual rights. Knowing that they would likely lose, members of the Federalist minority brought a stenographer to the convention to record their arguments for publication in the hopes of changing public opinion in the future.

== Outcome ==
The debate resulted in the delegates voting 184 to 84 to neither ratify nor reject the Constitution. One of the major reasons for North Carolina not ratifying the Constitution was its lack of a Bill of Rights. The delegates, however, proposed a series of amendments to personal liberties and urged the new federal Congress to adopt measures to incorporate a bill of rights into the Constitution. North Carolina would not join the Union until after it ratified the Constitution, more than a year later, at the November 1789 Fayetteville Convention.

== Delegates ==
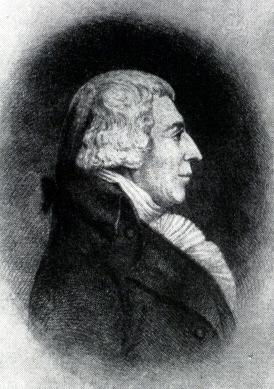
Richard Dobbs Spaight, Craven County delegate

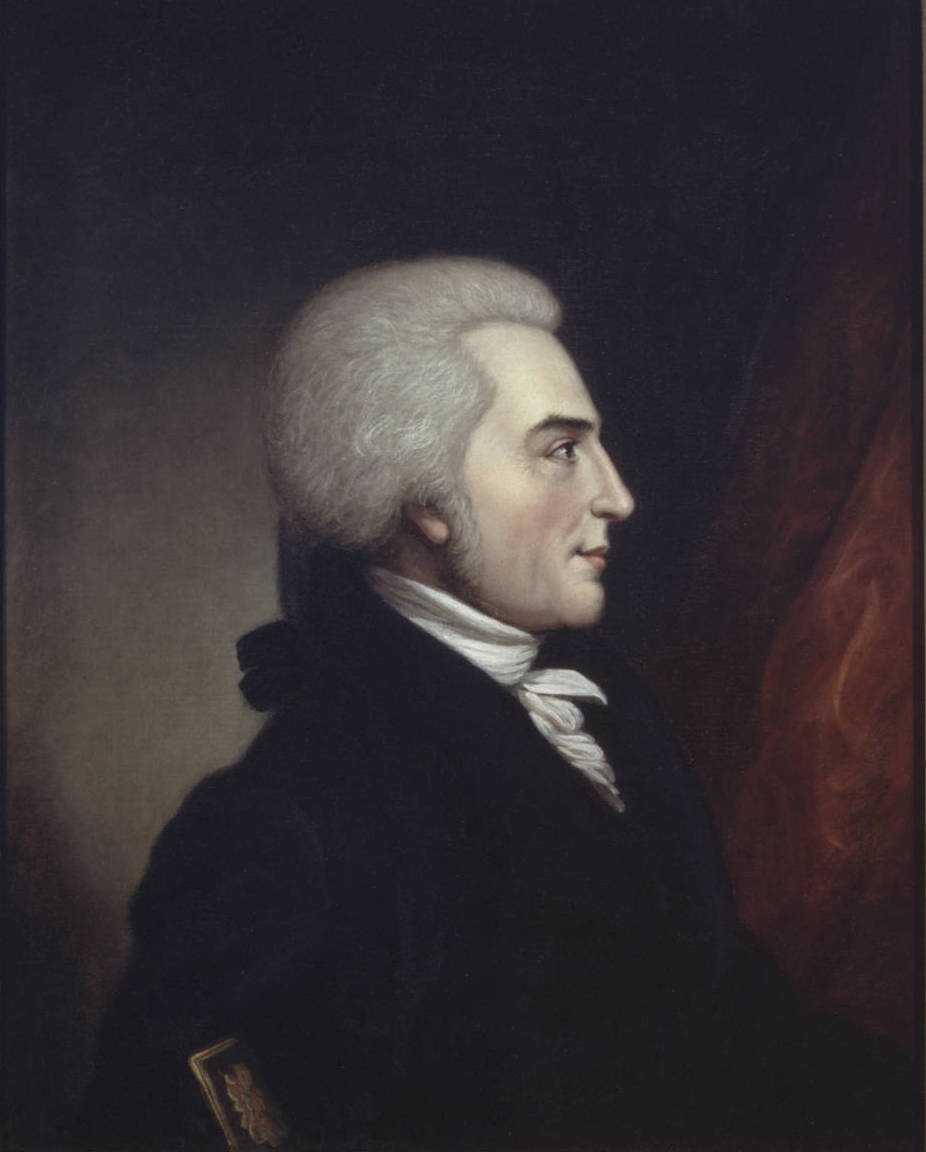
William Richardson Davie, Halifax delegate

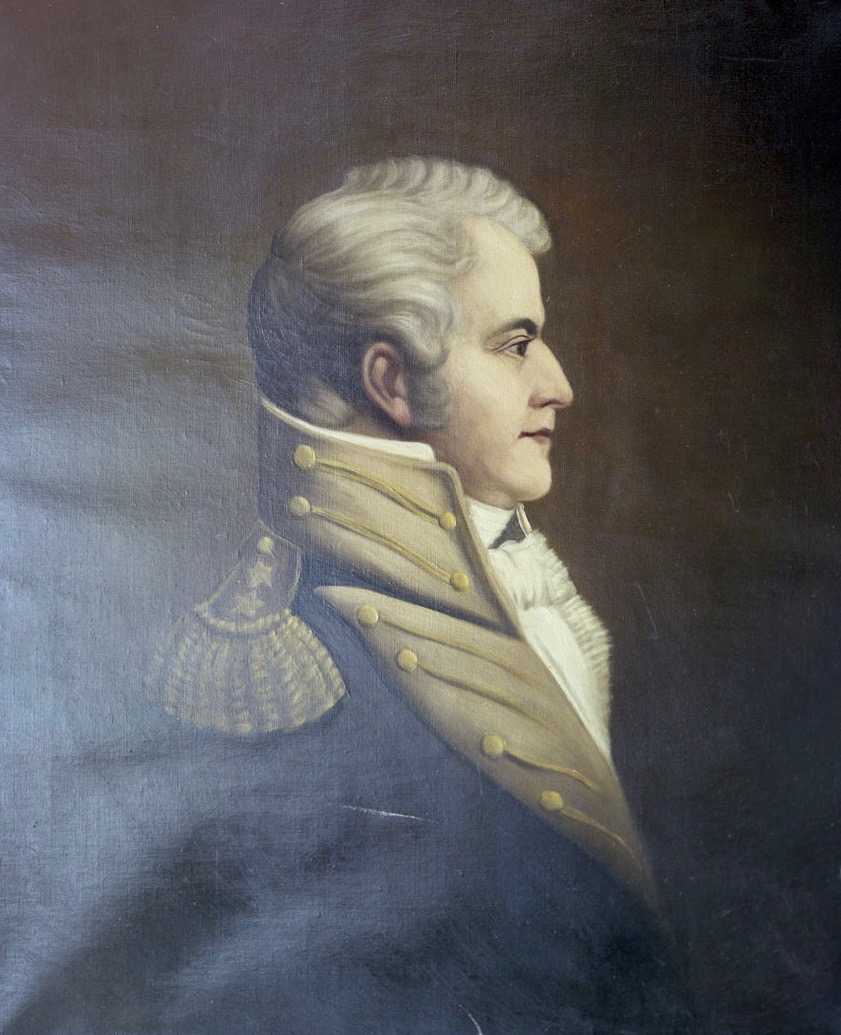
later Gov. Benjamin Smith, Brunswick delegate

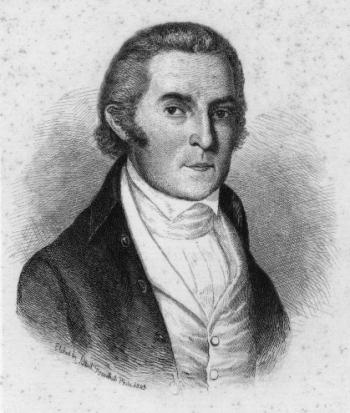
Willie Jones, Halifax delegate

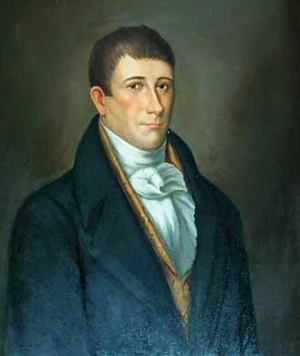
Benjamin Williams, Craven delegate

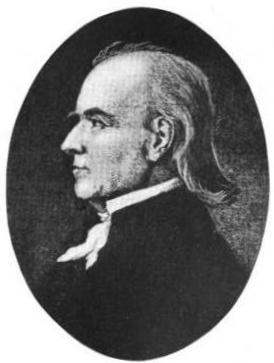
William Lenoir, Wilkes delegate

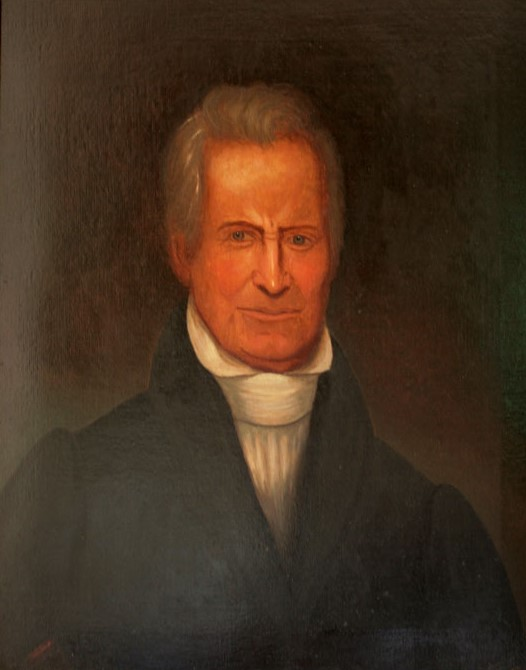
Joseph Graham, Mecklenburg delegate

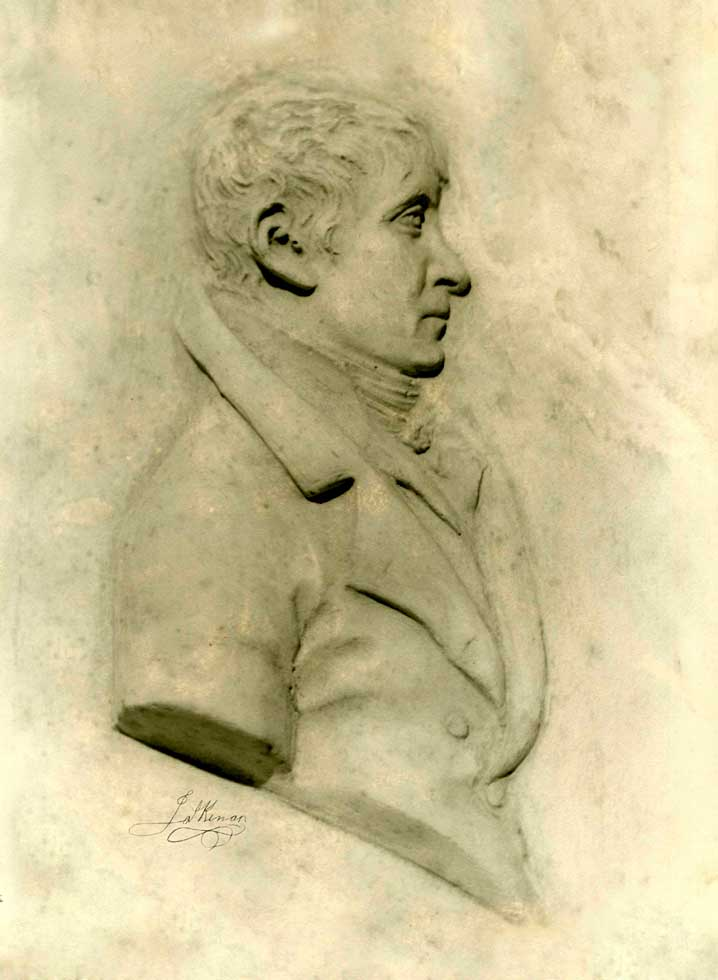
James Kenan, Duplin delegate

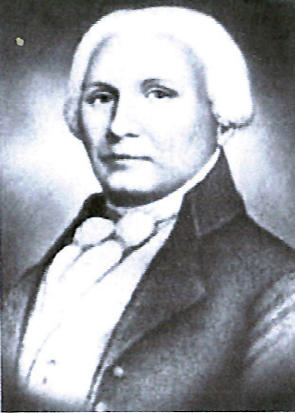
Joseph McDowell, Jr, Burke delegate

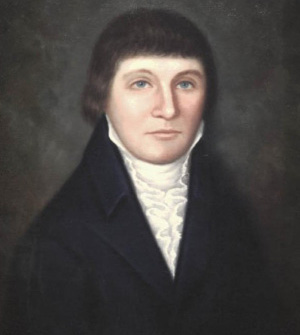
Richard Caswell, Dobbs delegate

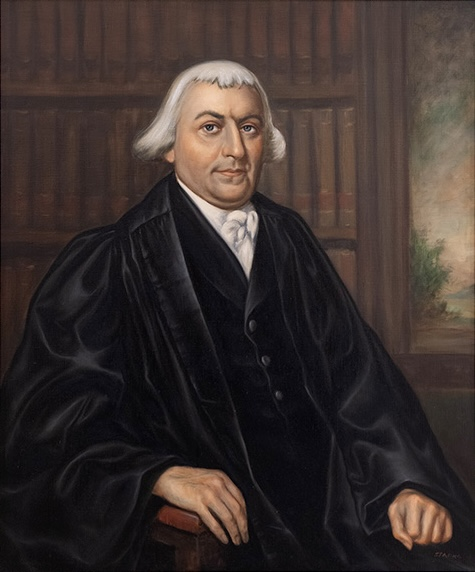
James Iredell, Edenton delegate

There were 294 known delegates from the 59 counties and seven boroughs of North Carolina. Some counties (Greene, Sullivan, Sumner, Tennessee, Washington) later became part of the state of Tennessee in 1796. The election of delegates from Dobbs County was declared invalid because of violence that led to the loss of the ballot box.

Governor Samuel Johnston was the President of the Convention. While his home was in Chowan County, he represented Perquimans County in the Convention. John Hunt was the secretary and James Taylor was the assistant secretary of the Convention. The doorkeepers of the convention were William Murfree, Peter Gooding, Nicholas Murfree, and James Mulloy.

Order	County or Borough	Delegate	Yeas	Nays
1	Perquimans	Johnston, Samuel, Esq., President	x	
2	Borough of Edenton	Iredell, James	x	
3	Borough of Wilmington	Maclaine, Archibald	x	
4	Beaufort	Keais, Nathan	x	
5	Beaufort	Blount, John G.	x	
6	Beaufort	Alderson, Thomas	x	
7	Bertie	Johnston, John	x	
8	Bertie	Oliver, Andrew	x	
9	Bladen	Elleston, Goodwin	x	
10	Burke	McDowell, Charles	x	
11	Craven	Spaight, Richard Dobbs	x	
12	Bertie	Dawson, William Johnston	x	
13	Cumberland	Porterfield, James	x	
14	Cumberland	Grove, William Barry	x	
15	Cumberland	Elliott, George	x	
16	Carteret	Styron, Willis	x	
17	Carteret	Shepperd, William	x	
18	Currituck	Phillips, James	x	
19	Currituck	Humphries, John	x	
20	Chowan	Payne, Michael	x	
21	Chowan	Johnson, Charles	x	
22	Chowan	Cabarrus, Stephen	x	
23	Chowan	Blount, Edmund	x	
24	Camden	Abbot, Henry	x	
25	Camden	Gregory, Isaac	x	
26	Camden	Dauge, Peter	x	
27	Camden	Grandy, Charles	x	
28	Camden	Sawyer, Enoch	x	
29	Chatham	Lucas, George	x	
30	Robeson	Willis, John	x	
31	Robeson	Cade, John	x	
32	Robeson	Barnes, Elias	x	
33	Robeson	Brown, Neil	x	
34	Sumner	Winchester, James	x	
35	Sumner	Stokes, William	x	
36	Tyrrell	Stuart, Thomas (sometimes Stewart)	x	
37	Tyrrell	Collins, Josiah	x	
38	Wake	Hines, Thomas	x	
39	Wake	Jones, Nathaniel	x	
40	Borough of Salisbury	Steele, John	x	
41	Borough of Halifax	Davie, William Richardson	x	
42	Gates	Riddick, Joseph	x	
43	Gates	Gregory, James	x	
44	Gates	Hunter, Thomas	x	
45	Hertford	Wyns, Thomas	x	
46	Hyde	Jones, Abraham	x	
47	Hyde	Eborne, John	x	
48	Hyde	Jasper, James	x	
49	Hyde	Foreman, Caleb	x	
50	Hyde	Hovey, Seth (Harvey)	x	
51	Lincoln	Sloan, John	x	
52	Lincoln	Moore, John	x	
53	Lincoln	Maclaine, William	x	
54	Martin	Mayo, Nathan	x	
55	Martin	Slade, William	x	
56	Martin	McKenzie, William	x	
57	Mecklenburg	Irwin, Robert	x	
58	Pasquotank	Lane, John	x	
59	Pasquotank	Reading, Thomas	x	
60	Pasquotank	Everegain, Edward	x	
61	Pasquotank	Relfe, Enoch	x	
62	Pasquotank	Davis, Devotion	x	
63	Perquimans	Skinner, William	x	
64	Perquimans	Skinner, Joshua	x	
65	Perquimans	Harvey, Thomas	x	
66	Perquimans	Skinner, John	x	
67	Hertford	Harrel, Samuel	x	
68	Craven	Leech, Joseph	x	
69	Johnston	Bridges, William (Bridger)	x	
70	Carteret	Burden, William	x	
71	Tyrrell	Blount, Edmund	x	
72	Tyrrell	Spruill, Simeon	x	
73	Bertie	Turner, David	x	
74	Martin	Hill, Whitmell	x	
75	Brunswick	Smith, Benjamin	x	
76	Borough of New Bern	Sitgreaves, John	x	
77	Chowan	Allen, Nathaniel	x	
78	Bladen	Owen, Thomas	x	
79	Hertford	Wyns, George	x	
80	Pitt	Perkins, David	x	
81	Currituck	Ferebee, Joseph	x	
82	Currituck	Ferebee, William	x	
83	Gates	Baker, William	x	
84	Craven	Neale, Abner	x	
85	Halifax	Jones, Willie		x
86	Anson	Spencer, Samuel		x
87	Anson	Lanier, Lewis		x
88	Anson	Wade, Thomas		x
89	Anson	Gould, Daniel		x
90	Beaufort	Bonner, James		x
91	Brunswick	Forster, Alexius M.		x
92	Brunswick	Dupree, Lewis		x
93	Bladen	Brown, Thomas		x
94	Burke	Greenlee, James		x
95	Burke	McDowell, Joseph "Pleasant Gardens"		x
96	Burke	Miller, Robert		x
97	Craven	Williams, Benjamin		x
98	Craven	Nixon, Richard		x
99	Cumberland	Armstrong, Thomas		x
100	Cumberland	McAllister, Alexander (McCallister)		x
101	Caswell	Dickins, Robert		x
102	Caswell	Roberts, George		x
103	Caswell	Womack, John		x
104	Chatham	Ramsey, Ambrose		x
105	Chatham	Anderson, James		x
106	Chatham	Stewart, Joseph		x
107	Chatham	Vestal, William		x
108	Davidson	Evans, Thomas		x
109	Davidson	Hardiman, Thomas		x
110	Davidson	Weakley, Robert		x
111	Davidson	Donaldson, William		x
112	Davidson	Dobins, William (Dobbin)		x
113	Edgecombe	Digges, Robert		x
114	Edgecombe	Bell, Bythel		x
115	Edgecombe	Battle, Elisha		x
116	Edgecombe	Fort, William		x
117	Edgecombe	Gray, Ethelred		x
118	Franklin	Lancaster, William		x
119	Franklin	Sherrod, Thomas		x
120	Franklin	Norwood, John		x
121	Pitt	Dupree, Sterling		x
122	Pitt	Williams, Robert		x
123	Pitt	Moye, Richard		x
124	Pitt	Forbes, Arthur		x
125	Guilford	Caldwell, David		x
126	Guilford	Goudy, William (Gowdy)		x
127	Guilford	Gillespie, Daniel		x
128	Guilford	Anderson, John		x
129	Guilford	Hamilton, John		x
130	Granville	Person, Thomas		x
131	Granville	Taylor, Joseph		x
132	Granville	Yancey, Thornton		x
133	Granville	Lewis, Howell, Jun.		x
134	Granville	Mitchell, Elijah		x
135	Rutherford	Moore, George		x
136	Rutherford	Ledbetter, George		x
137	Rutherford	Porter, William		x
138	Randolph	Wood, Zebedee		x
139	Randolph	Waddill, Edmund		x
140	Rockingham	Galloway, James		x
141	Robeson	Regan, John		x
142	Surry	Winston, Joseph		x
143	Surry	Gains, James		x
144	Surry	McAnnelly, Charles		x
145	Surry	Bostick, Absalom (Bostwick)		x
146	Sullivan	Scott, John		x
147	Sullivan	Dunkin, John		x
148	Sampson	Dodd, David		x
149	Sampson	Ivey, Curtis		x
150	Sampson	Holmes, Lewis		x
151	Sampson	Clinton, Richard		x
152	Sampson	Holmes, Hardy		x
153	Washington	Alison, Robert (Alison)		x
154	Washington	Stuart, James (Stewart)		x
155	Washington	Tipton, John		x
156	Warren	Macon, John		x
157	Warren	Christmass, Thomas		x
158	Warren	Montfort/Montford, Henry		x
159	Wayne	Taylor, William		x
160	Wayne	Handley, James		x
161	Wake	Saunders, Brittain (Sanders)		x
162	Wilkes	Lenoir, William		x
163	Wilkes	Allen, Richard		x
164	Wilkes	Brown, John		x
165	Wilkes	Herndon, Joseph		x
166	Wilkes	Fletcher, James		x
167	Hertford	Burkit, Lemuel		x
168	Hertford	Little, William		x
169	Hawkins	King, Thomas		x
170	Jones	Bryan, Nathan		x
171	Jones	Bryan, John Hill		x
172	Jones	Whitty, Edward		x
173	Lincoln	Alexander, Robert		x
174	Lincoln	Johnson, James		x
175	Moore	Cox, John		x
176	Moore	Carrel, John		x
177	Moore	Doud, Cornelius		x
178	Moore	Tyson, Thomas		x
179	Moore	Martin, William		x
180	Martin	Hunter, Thomas		x
181	Mecklenburg	Graham, Joseph (John?)		x
182	Montgomery	Loftin, William		x
183	Montgomery	Kindall, William		x
184	Montgomery	Ussory, Thomas		x
185	Montgomery	Butler, Thomas		x
186	Northampton	Bendford, John (Bentford)		x
187	Northampton	Vaughan, James		x
188	Northampton	Peebles, Robert		x
189	Northampton	Vinson, James		x
190	Nash	Marnes, William S.		x
191	Nash	Ellin, Howell		x
192	Nash	Bunn, Redman		x
193	Nash	Bonds, John		x
194	Nash	Pridgen, David		x
195	Onslow	Yates, Daniel		x
196	Onslow	Johnston, Thomas		x
197	Onslow	Spicer, John, Jr.		x
198	Borough of Hillsboro	Tatom, Abasalom		x
199	Orange	Mebane, Alexander		x
200	Orange	Mebane, William		x
201	Orange	McCauley, William		x
202	Orange	Shepperd, William		x
203	Orange	Lindley, Jonathan		x
204	Warren	Hawkins, Wyatt		x
205	Warren	Payne, James		x
206	Caswell	Graves, John		x
207	Washington	Blair, John		x
208	Washington	Tipton, Joseph		x
209	Rockingham	Bethell, William		x
210	Rockingham	Phillips, Abraham		x
211	Rockingham	May, John		x
212	Rockingham	Galloway, Charles		x
213	Caswell	Bowell, James		x
214	Richmond	McAllister, John (McAllastar)		x
215	Sullivan	Looney, David		x
216	Sullivan	Sharpe, John		x
217	Bladen	Gaitier, Joseph		x
218	New Hanover	Campbell, John A.		x
219	New Hanover	Williams, John Pugh		x
220	Hawkins	Marshall, William		x
221	Richmond	Robinson, Charles		x
222	Duplin	Gillespie, James		x
223	Duplin	Ward, Charles		x
224	Jones	Randal, William		x
225	Jones	Hargett, Frederick		x
226	Wayne	McKinnie, Richard		x
227	Brunswick	Cains/Caims, John		x
228	Brunswick	Leonard, Jacob		x
229	Rowan	Carson, Thomas		x
230	Rutherford	Singleton, Richard		x
231	Rutherford	Whiteside, James		x
232	Mecklenburg	Phifer, Caleb		x
233	Mecklenburg	Wilson, Zachias		x
234	Mecklenburg	Douglas, Joseph		x
235	Randolph	Dougan, Thomas		x
236	Duplin	Kenan, James		x
237	Halifax	Jones, John		x
238	Halifax	Haywood, Egbert		x
239	Halifax	Wooten, William		x
240	Halifax	Branch, John		x
241	Franklin	Hill, Henry		x
242	Wayne	Bass, Andrew		x
243	Johnston	Boon, Joseph		x
244	Johnston	Farmer, William		x
245	Johnston	Bryan, John		x
246	Richmond	Williams, Edward		x
247	Duplin	Oliver, Francis		x
248	Surry	Brooks, Matthew		x
249	Rowan	Rutherford, Griffith		x
250	Rowan	Barringer, George Henry		x
251	New Hanover	Bloodworth, Timothy		x
252	Johnston	Pearce, Everet		x
253	Greene	Rawlings, Asabel		x
254	Greene	Wilson, James		x
255	Greene	Roddy, James		x
256	Bladen	Cain, Samuel		x
257	Richmond	Covington, Benjamin		x
258	Burke	McDowall, Joseph, Jr.		x
259	Franklin	Hall, Durham		x
260	New Hanover	Bloodworth, James		x
261	Wake	Lane, Joel		x
262	Wake	Hinton, James		x
263	New Hanover	Devane, Thomas		x
264	Rowan	Brandon, James (Brannon)		x
265	Duplin	Dickson, William		x
266	Wayne	Mooring, Burwell		x
267	Rowan	Locke, Matthew (Lock)		x
268	Hawkins	Donelson, Stokely		x
269	Anson	Wood, Frame		
270	Carteret	Wallace, David		
271	Carteret	Borden, Thomas, Jr.		
272	Borough of Fayetteville	Ingram, John		
273	Dobbs	Caswell, Richard		
274	Dobbs	Glasgow, James		
275	Dobbs	Caswell, Winston		
276	Dobbs	Sheppard, Bennett		
277	Dobbs	Lassiter, Nathan (Lasseter)		
278	Montgomery	McDondald, James		
279	New Hannover	Huske, John		
280	Northampton	Peterson, John		
281	Onslow	Snead, Robert W. (Sneed)		
282	Onslow	Starkey, Edward		
283	Randolph	Hanley, Jeff		
284	Randolph	Bowdon, William		
285	Sullivan	Martin, Joseph		
286	Sumner	Smith, Daniel		
287	Sumner	Wilson, David		
288	Sumner	Douglass, Edward		
289	Tennessee	Montgomery, John		
290	Tennessee	Drew, John		
291	Tennessee	Johnston, Thomas		
292	Tennessee	Blount, William		
293	Tennessee	Menees, Benjamin		
294	Tyrrell	Spruill, Hezekiah		

== See also ==
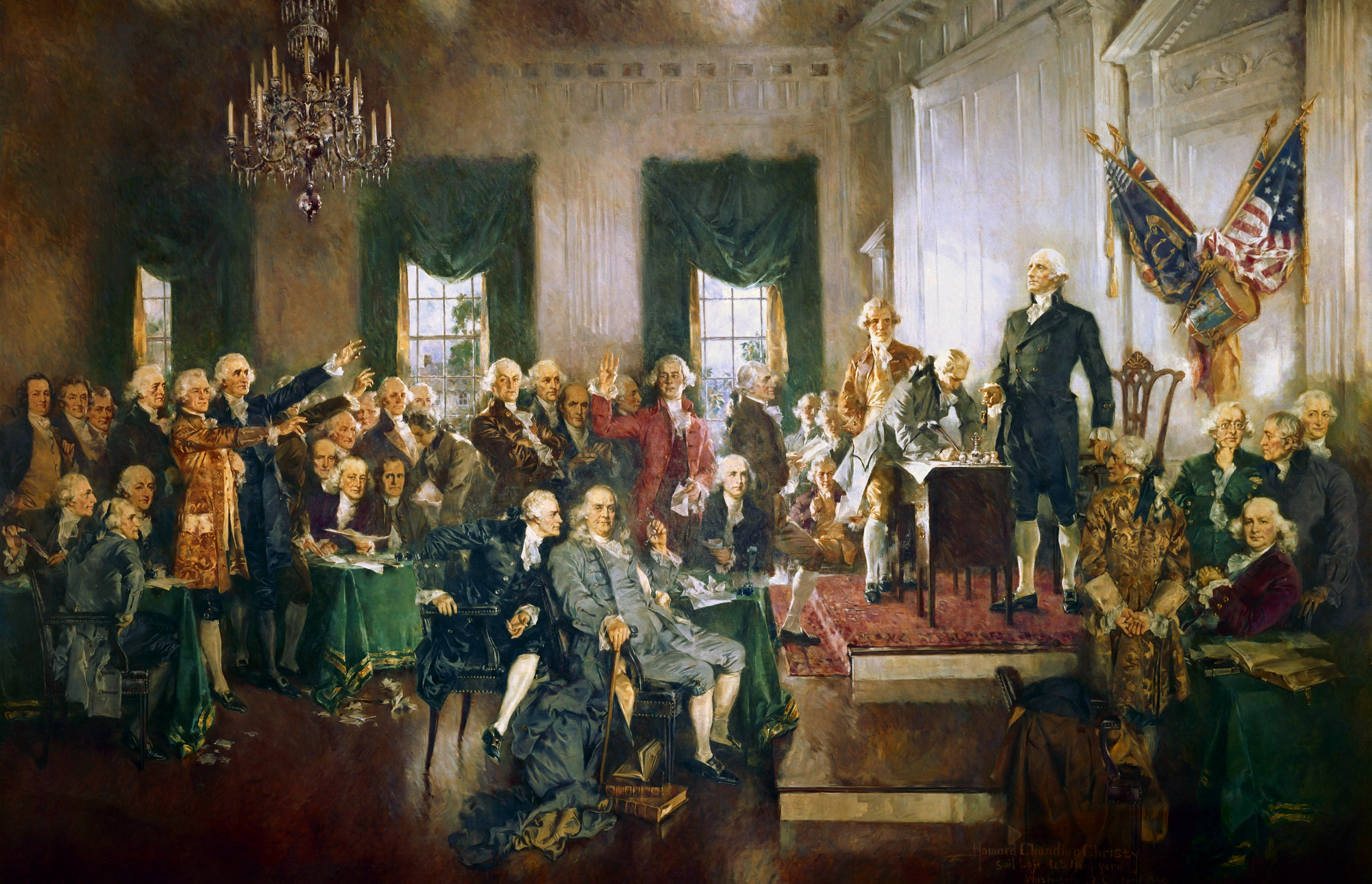
Scene at the Signing of the Constitution of the United States, signing is Richard Dobbs Spaight, behind him is William Blount and Hugh Williamson

- Fayetteville Convention
- History of the United States Constitution
- Scene at the Signing of the Constitution of the United States, 1940 painting by Howard Chandler Christy, shows Richard Dobbs Spaight, William Blount, and Hugh Williamson of North Carolina at center stage
- Timeline of drafting and ratification of the United States Constitution
