= Henry William Harrington (North Carolina general) =

American colonial general

Colonel Henry William Harrington
- Born: May 12, 1747; London, England
- Died: March 31, 1809 (aged 61); Richmond County, North Carolina
- Spouse: Rosanna Auld
- Military career
- Allegiance: United States
- Branch: North Carolina and South Carolina militias
- Service years: 1775-1780
- Rank: Brigadier General (Pro Tempore)
- Units: Cheraws District Regiment of South Carolina militia (1775-1776); North Carolina militia: Anson County Regiment (1777-1779), Richmond County Regiment (1779-1780), Salisbury District Brigade (July to December 1780)
- Commands: Richmond County Regiment, Salisbury District Brigade

Henry William Harrington (May 12, 1747 - March 31, 1809) was a Brigadier General in the American Revolution, legislator, and planter. He commanded the Richmond County Regiment of the North Carolina militia from 1779 to 1780.

== Early life ==
Henry was born in London, England on Mary 12, 1747. His parents are unknown. He emigrated as a young man to Jamaica. From there, he emigrated to the Province of South Carolina and settled near the Pee Dee River across the river from Cheraw Hill, South Carolina, and later Welsh Neck. Before the Revolutionary War, he was active in church and civic affairs. He was a warden and vestryman of St. David's Parish in Cheraw Hill. He served on the first grand jury and later as clerk in Chesterfield County, South Carolina.

In August 1775, Harrington was commissioned as a captain in Cheraws District Regiment of Militia. He selected as chairman of the Committee of Observation for St. David's parish, where he reported on the state of the colonial militia, local defense, and the Cheraw District Committee of Safety. In March 1776, he was selected as sheriff of the Cheraw District. While his regiment did not see action in the nearby Haddrell's Point near Charles Town, where a campaign was mounted against Sir Henry Clinton, he did receive prisoners that he kept in the Cheraw District jail.

On July 31, 1776, Harrington married Rosanna Auld of Anson County, North Carolina. After marriage, the couple moved to Anson County, North Carolina. In 1779, the area where they lived became Richmond County, North Carolina.

== Revolutionary War service ==
After moving to Anson County, Harrington served as a Captain in the Anson County Regiment of North Carolina militia. On November 25, 1779, he was commissioned as a Colonel of the Richmond County Regiment of the North Carolina militia, which was commanded by Colonel Charles Medlock. In July 1780, he was appointed by the North Carolina Council of State as Brigadier General (Pro Tempore) of the Salisbury District Brigade of militia, while the permanent commander, general Griffith Rutherford, was imprisoned after his capture at the Battle of Camden. During his brief command, he seized the town of Cheraw, South Carolina from the British forces on December 27, 1780, and ordered a POW camp to be erected there. Unbeknownst to Harrington, a newly created Council of State appointed Will Lee Davidson to command the Salisbury District Brigade on September 9, 1780. The commander of the Anson County Regiment, Colonel Thomas Wade, told him about the selection of Davidson. After asking for guidance from Major General Horatio Gates and receiving none, Harrington continued to lead his troops in South Carolina. He resigned his commission in December 1780 and went home.

== Death ==
He died on March 31, 1809, at his home in Richmond County. He was buried in a family graveyard overlooking the Pee Dee River in Wolf Pit Township, Richmond County. A marble slab marks his grave and etched upon it are the words: "Here lies one who united in himself the bold achievements of the statesman and patriot with the mild virtues of social life, the kind neighbor, the tender husband and the fond parent."
