= Harriet Nisbet Latta =

American civic leader

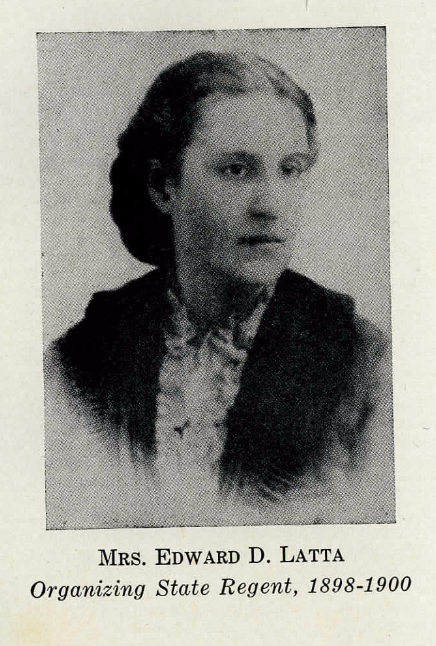

North Carolina State Regent of the Daughters of the American Revolution
- In role 1898–1900

Personal details
- Born: Harriet L. Nisbet; May 13, 1853 Macon, Georgia, U.S.
- Died: October 9, 1910 (aged 57) Charlotte, North Carolina, U.S.
- Resting place: Elmwood Cemetery
- Spouse: Edward Dilworth Latta
- Children: 3
- Parent(s): Thomas Cooper Nisbet; Mary Cuthbert Cumming

Harriet L. Nisbet Latta (May 13, 1853 – October 9, 1910), also known upon her marriage as Mrs. E.D. Latta, was an American civic leader who served as the organizing State Regent of the North Carolina Society of the Daughters of the American Revolution. In her capacity as regent, she formed chapters in Charlotte, Henderson, Waynesville, and Salisbury.

== Biography ==
Latta was born Harriet L. Nisbet on May 13, 1853, in Macon, Georgia to Thomas Cooper Nisbet, of Statesville, North Carolina, and Mary Cuthbert Cumming Nisbet, of Savannah, Georgia. She was a descendent of John Nisbet, a colonial merchant who fought in the American Revolutionary War and served in the North Carolina Senate and the Fayetteville Convention, and of Colonel Adlai Osborne, who commanded the 2nd Rowan County Regiment during the revolution. Nisbet was also a descendent of John Nisbet, a Scottish covenanter who was executed for taking part in the Battle of Bothwell Bridge.

In 1877, she married the industrialist Edward Dilworth Latta, who would later become one of the wealthiest men in North Carolina. The couple lived in New York City until 1881, when they relocated to Charlotte, North Carolina. In Charlotte, they first lived on North Tryon Street in Uptown Charlotte, followed by South Boulevard. They later built a palatial mansion on East Boulevard in the Dilworth neighborhood.

She and her husband had three children: Marion Nisbet, Edward Dilworth Nisbet Jr., and Janet Acton Nisbet.

In 1898, Latta was appointed by national officers in Washington, D.C. to serve as the organizing State Regent for the North Carolina Society of the Daughters of the American Revolution. As state regent, she organized North Carolina's first DAR chapter, the Mecklenburg Chapter, in Charlotte. Latta also formed chapters in Henderson, Salisbury, and Waynesville. She served as state regent until 1900.

Latta died on October 9, 1910, from typhoid fever. Her funeral, officiated by Rev. Dr. William Morris Kincaid of First Presbyterian Church, was held at her residence.
