= John Nisbet (disambiguation) =

John Nisbet was a Scottish Presbyterian soldier

John Nisbet may also refer to:

- John Nisbet, Lord Dirleton – Scottish judge
- John Nisbet (North Carolina patriot) – American revolutionary patriot
- John Nisbet, murder victim of John Dickman in 1910
