= Senator Nisbet =

Senator Nisbet may refer to:

- Eugenius Aristides Nisbet (1803–1871), Georgia State Senate
- John Nisbet (North Carolina patriot) (1738–1817), North Carolina State Senate
