= Regina Lynch-Hudson =

American publicist and writer

- Born: Black Mountain, North Carolina, U.S.
- Education: Bennett College
- Occupations: publicist, travel writer, historian
- Spouse: Courtland Bivens III

Regina Lynch-Hudson is an American publicist, historian, and travel writer. In 2024, she became the first woman of color descended from Colonel John Hazzard Carson to join the National Society Daughters of the American Revolution and the first black member of the society's Greenlee Chapter.

== Early life and family ==
Lynch-Hudson was born and raised in Black Mountain, North Carolina. She was raised by her uncle and aunt, Sergeant Winfred Lynch and Pearl Lynch, and grew up a house that was originally owned by her grandparents, Blanch Lynch and Juanita Burnette Lynch.

She is a great-great-granddaughter of George Washington Richard Henry Lee Payne, an African-American man who was one of the first blacksmiths at the Biltmore Estate. She is a fifth-great-granddaughter of Colonel John Hazzard Carson, an Irish-American colonist who fought in the American Revolutionary War. She is also descended from people enslaved by Carson at Carson House, a 640-acre plantation in Marion, North Carolina.

Lynch-Hudson attended Bennett College, a private historically black all-girls school in Greensboro, North Carolina.

== Career ==
Lynch-Hudson works as a publicist and a travel writer. She founded the public relations firm The Write Publicist.

She is also a historian, curating five exhibits at the Swannanoa Valley Museum focused on her family and their history in the Swannanoa Valley and Western North Carolina. She also curated an exhibit at the North Carolina Transportation Museum. She was on the team of curators who installed a permanent exhibit at the Biltmore Estate honoring people of color who built the estate. She is also co-administrator of The John Carson of Western North Carolina Project and the Carson Plantations Project with FamilyTreeDNA.

In 2009, she authored Family Gems: A Pictorial History of Western North Carolina Ancestors.

In April 2024, Lynch-Hudson presented on diversity and representation in museums at the North Carolina Museum Council Conference in Cherokee, North Carolina.

== Personal life ==
Lynch Hudson is married to Ret. Colonel Courtland C. Bivens III, a patent-holding NASA inventor and aerospace engineer. They live in Roswell, Georgia.

In August 2006, she and her husband appeared on the HGTV show What's With That House?, showcasing their home, The Daffodil Villa.

In 2024, she became the first black woman to join the Greenlee Chapter of the Daughters of the American Revolution in Old Fort, North Carolina. She is the first person of color descended from Colonel Carson to join the national society. During her historic induction into the Daughters of the American Revolution, Lynch-Hudson wore a scarf replica of a quilt on display at the Carson House that was made by a foremother enslaved there named Kadella.
