= Archibald Murphey =

American politician

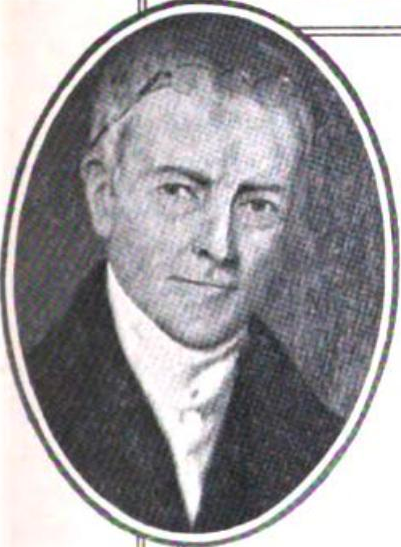
Murphey

Archibald DeBow Murphey (c. 1777 – February 1, 1832) was an American attorney, jurist, and politician who was known as the "Father of Education" in North Carolina. He served in the North Carolina State Senate from 1812 to 1818. While serving as a state senator, he proposed establishing a funded program for public education in the lower grades, in addition to creating public works to enhance economic development in the state.

== Biography ==
Murphey was born near Red House Presbyterian Church in Orange County, North Carolina (in an area that later was organized as Caswell County). His father Archibald Murphey served in the Revolutionary Army in North Carolina; his mother, Jane DeBow, was from New Jersey. Archibald was one of seven children. He was first educated at the local Dr. Caldwell's Academy. He entered the University of North Carolina in 1796 and graduated in 1799 with honors.

Murphey taught at his college for a few years. He moved to Hillsborough, North Carolina to study law with William Duffy, an established attorney, from July to November 1801, at the home now known as Twin Chimneys. He passed the bar. After marrying Jane Armistead Scott, Murphey bought the Hermitage plantation from her father, John Scott. Murphey became very active in business and political affairs.

He was elected to represent Orange County in the North Carolina State Senate, serving from 1812 to 1818. Murphey was well known for his proposals regarding internal improvements, government-funded public schools, and constitutional reform.

In 1817, Murphey submitted a legislative report recommending that North Carolina create a publicly financed system of education, which he believed critical to the future of the state. At the time, all education was private, depending on families who could afford to send children to academies or hire private tutors, or students who worked their way through getting an education.

After his tenure, Murphey continued to work on ideas for the state; in 1819 he drafted a program to build roads and canals throughout the state in order to support economic development. This proposal was ignored by Murphey's fellow legislators.

In 1818, he had been elected by the legislature as a superior court judge. After two years he gave up the position in order to work to improve his finances. He began to research a history of the State of North Carolina, compiling numerous papers and historical documents.

Although Murphey did not secure an appointment to the North Carolina Supreme Court, he was asked in its early years to fill in when any of the three judges on the court had to recuse themselves because of conflicts of interest from their previous law practices.

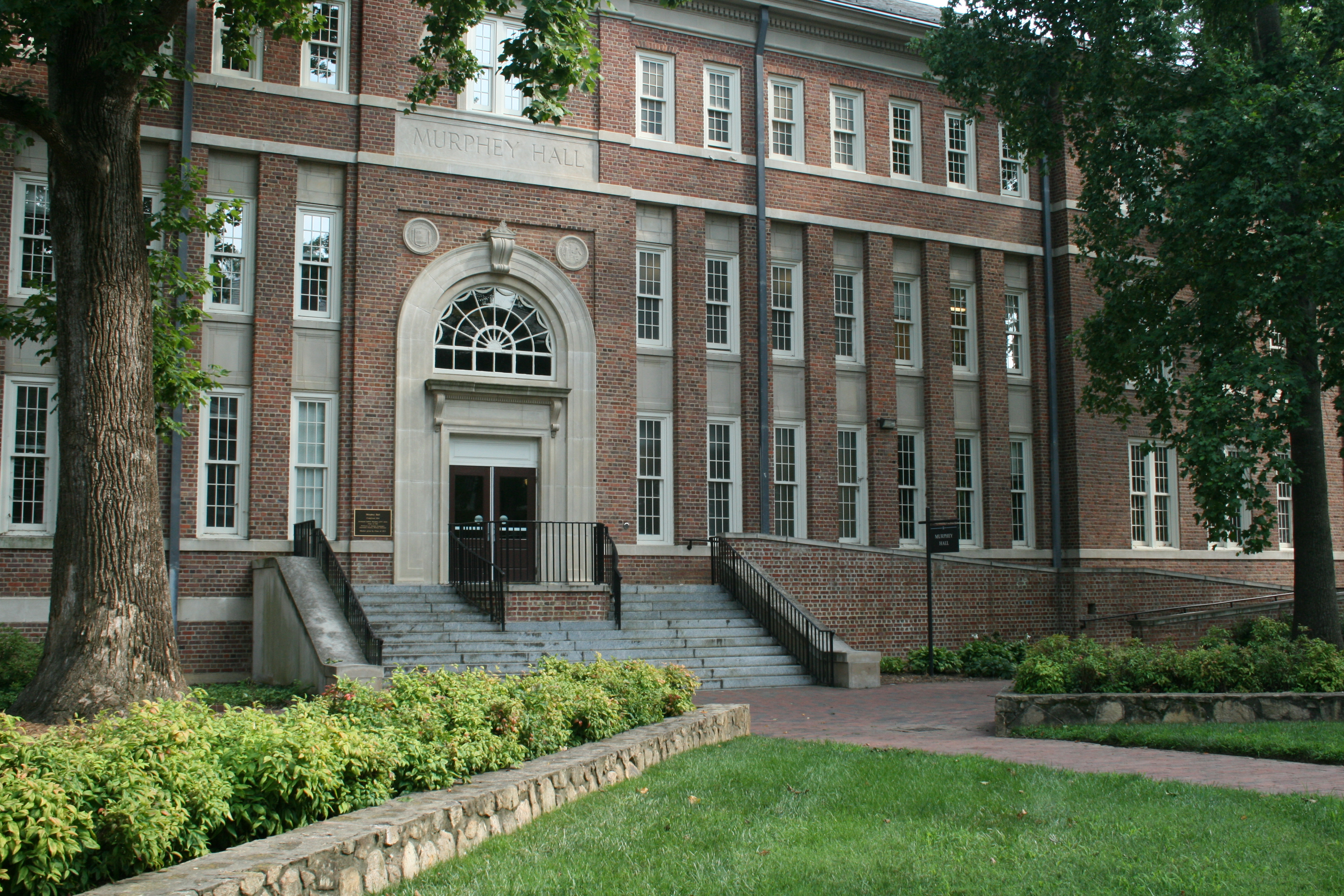
Murphey Hall at UNC

Murphey did not succeed in accomplishing his major goals. He never completed his state history, but his associated papers are held by universities: the first volume by Harvard University and the second volume by the University of Virginia. Later historians have used these extensively. Murphey's financial problems became more severe, and in 1829 he was jailed for 20 days in Greensboro, North Carolina because of debts.

Archibald Murphey died at Twin Chimneys in Hillsborough, North Carolina, on February 1, 1832. He is buried at the cemetery adjacent to Hillsborough Presbyterian Church.

== Legacy and honors ==
- The town of Murphy, North Carolina was named after him.
- Murphey Hall at the University of North Carolina was named for him.
- Murphey Traditional Academy, an elementary school in Greensboro, North Carolina, also bears his name, as do several public schools in Orange and Caswell counties.
- An historical marker located along Churton Street in Hillsborough, North Carolina, summarizes his career and indicates the proximity of his grave.
