= David Caldwell Log College Site =

- U.S. National Register of Historic Places
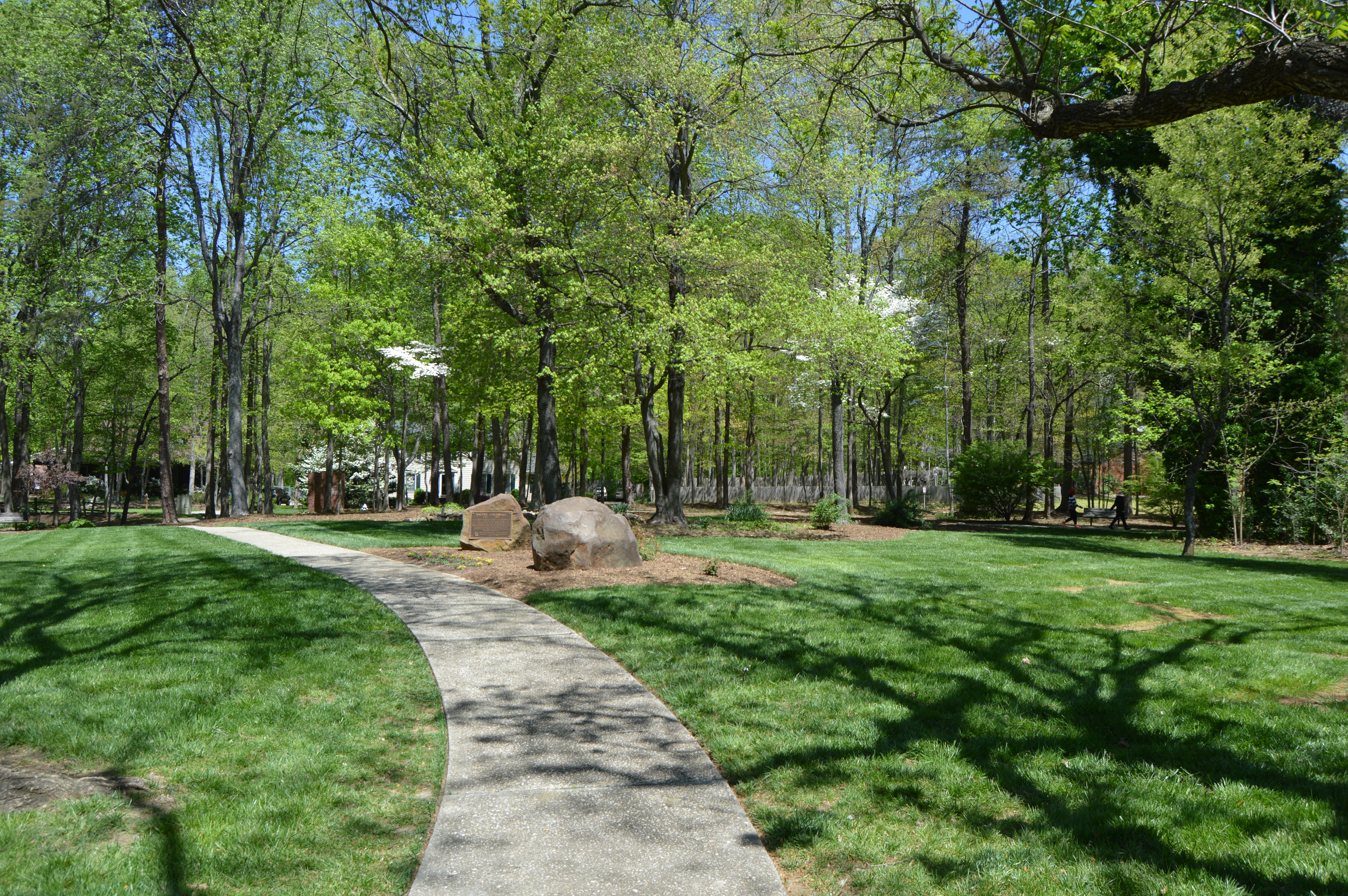
- Site overview
- Nearest city: Greensboro, North Carolina
- Area: 4 acres (1.6 ha)
- NRHP reference No.: 82003456
- Added to NRHP: January 13, 1982

David Caldwell Log College Site is a historic archaeological site located at Greensboro, Guilford County, North Carolina. It was the site of the 1767 home, school, and farm operated by David Caldwell and his family through about 1825. The site underwent archaeological excavations in 1959-1960 and 1979. It was the site of Dr. Caldwell's Academy, perhaps the most influential Southern academy of the era. Among those educated at the academy was Archibald Murphey. The land was also used as a staging area for the Battle of Guilford Courthouse in 1781.

It was listed on the National Register of Historic Places in 1982.
