= Richmond County Regiment =

American colonial military unit

- Active: 1779-1783
- Allegiance: North Carolina
- Branch: North Carolina militia
- Type: Militia
- Role: infantry
- Part of: Brigade

Commanders
- Notable commanders: Col. Henry William Harrington; Col. Charles Medlock; Col. Thomas Crawford

The Richmond County Regiment was authorized on October 30, 1779 by the North Carolina General Assembly of 1779. It was created at the same time that Richmond County, North Carolina was created. Officers were appointed and commissioned by the Governor. The regiment was engaged in battles and skirmishes against the British during the American Revolution in North Carolina and South Carolina between 1780 and 1781. It was active until the end of the war.

== Officers ==
Commandants and colonels:

- Colonel Henry William Harrington (1779-1780, 2nd colonel): In 1776-1776, he was a Captain in the South Carolina Cheraws District Regiment of militia. In 1777-1779, he was a Captain in the Anson County Regiment. From July to December, he was Brigadier General Pro Tempore and acting commander of the Salisbury District Brigade.
- Colonel Charles Medlock (1779-1783, commander)
- Colonel Thomas Crawford (1780-1783, 2nd colonel)

== See also ==
- List of American Revolutionary War battles
- Salisbury District Brigade
- Southern Campaigns: Pension Transactions for a description of the transcription effort by Will Graves
- Southern theater of the American Revolutionary War

== Bibliography ==
- Arthur, John Preston, Western North Carolina; a history (1730-1913), National Society Daughters of the American Revolution of North Carolina. Edward Buncombe Chapter, Asheville, North Carolina, Publication date 1914, Link, accessed Jan 29, 2019
- Hunter, C.L.; Sketches of western North Carolina, historical and biographical : illustrating principally the Revolutionary period of Mecklenburg, Rowan, Lincoln, and adjoining counties, accompanied with miscellaneous information, much of it never before published, Raleigh : Raleigh News Steam Job Print, 1877; pages 166-183
- Mazzocchi, Jay (2006). "Richmond County".
