= John Hazzard Carson =

American revolutionary

Member of the North Carolina House of Representatives
- In office 1805–1806

Delegate to the Fayetteville Convention
- In office November 16, 1789 – November 23, 1789

Personal details
- Born: March 24, 1752 County Fermanagh, Kingdom of Ireland, British Empire
- Died: March 5, 1841 (aged 88) Buck Creek, North Carolina, U.S.
- Spouse(s): Rachel Matilda McDowell; Mary Moffett McDowell
- Children: 12

Military service
- Allegiance: United States
- Branch/service: North Carolina Militia
- Years of service: 1776–1782
- Rank: Colonel
- Battles/wars: Battle of Kings Mountain

John Hazzard Carson (March 24, 1752 – March 5, 1841) was an American military officer, politician, planter, and revolutionary. He served in the North Carolina Militia during the American Revolutionary War and as a delegate for Burke County to the Fayetteville Convention. Carson served in the North Carolina House of Representatives in 1805 and 1806. He was the owner of Carson House, a plantation in Marion, North Carolina.

== Early life ==
Carson was born in County Fermanagh in 1752 to Scotch-Irish parents. He arrived in the Thirteen Colonies in 1773, living in the Province of Pennsylvania for two years before settling in Burke County, a part of the Colonial frontier in the Province of North Carolina.

== Military career ==
During the American Revolution, Carson served in the North Carolina Militia. He enlisted in March 1776 in the 2nd Rowan County Regiment under Captain William Moore, Reuben White and Joseph McDowell. That same year, he served as Forage Master under General Griffith Rutherford, as a volunteer in William Moore's company of Col. Christopher Beekmans of the Rowan County Regiment, in the Cross Creek Expedition, and in a skirmish against a Cherokee siege in North Fork of the Catawba River. In 1777 he served in actions against the Cherokee under the command of Captain William Moore and, in 1778, he served under the command of Captain McDowell. In 1781, he was a forage master under Brigadier General Griffith Rutherford and Colonel Charles McDowell and was promoted to the rank of captain. In 1782 he served as paymaster of the Burke County Regiment and, later, was promoted to the rank of colonel.

== Political career ==
Carson represented Burke County in the Fayetteville Convention that ratified the United States Constitution in 1789. From 1805 to 1806, he served in the North Carolina General Assembly as a representative of Burke County and was active in county government.

== Personal life ==
Carson married Rachel Matilda McDowell in 1778. They had seven children.

In 1793, he received a land grant for six hundred and forty acres on the waters of Buck Creek and Clear Creek, near what would become Marion. It was here that he built his plantation Garden Hill. As many as sixty-eight people were enslaved on his plantation.

After the death of his first wife, Carson married Mary Moffett McDowell, the widow of Major Joseph McDowell of Pleasant Gardens Plantation. He had five more children from his second marriage.

He died in Buck Creek on March 5, 1841.
