= David Caldwell (North Carolina minister) =

American minister and statesman (1725–1824)

David Stewart Caldwell (1725–1824) was a Presbyterian minister, educator, physician, statesman, and early settler in Guilford County, North Carolina, in the mid 1700s.

== Early and personal life ==
David Caldwell was born in Lancaster County, Pennsylvania Colony on March 25, 1725. He was the oldest of four sons of Andrew and Martha Caldwell. His father was a farmer.

Caldwell served as a carpenter until age twenty five when he entered the College of New Jersey (now Princeton University) and was graduated in 1761. After graduation, he studied theology and was licensed as a clergyman in 1763 by the Presbytery of New Brunswick. Caldwell was ordained in 1765 and took an assignment as a missionary in the North Carolina back country. He became pastor of the Buffalo and Alamance Presbyterian churches, established by the Nottingham Colony, in Rowan County, North Carolina (the section that became Guilford County in 1771).

Caldwell married Rachel Craighead in 1766. Caldwell had eight sons and a daughter.

== Teaching, military and political career ==
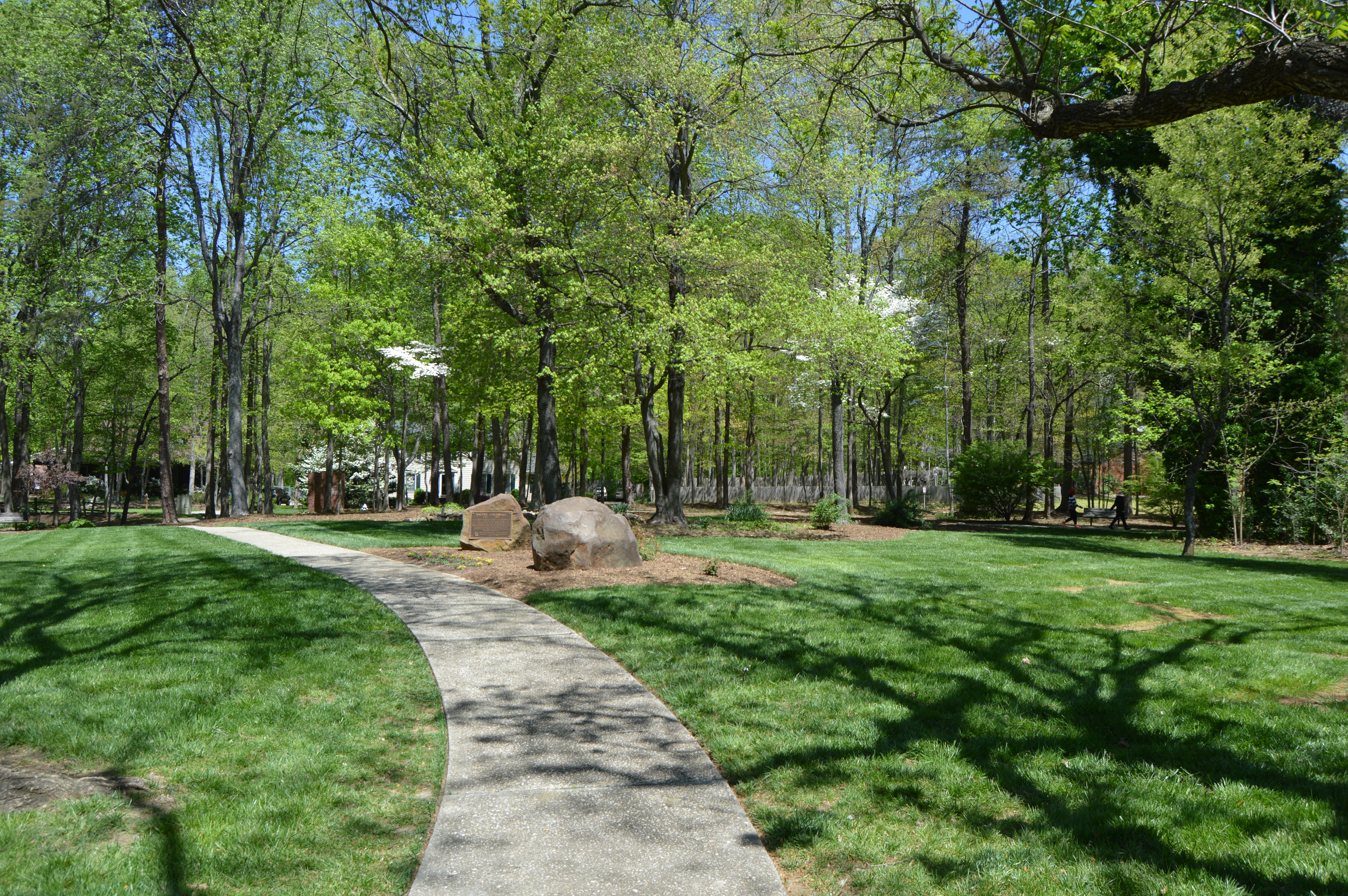
Site of the Caldwell Log College, now Tanger Bicentennial Gardens

In 1767, he established what became known as the Dr. Caldwell's Log College in what would become Guilford County. This college was a theological and classical school for young men.

A lack of physicians in the area of North Carolina where he lived, prompted him to study medicine from books that he acquired from Philadelphia. He became a self-taught practicing physician, which was useful also during the military conflicts of the times.

David Caldwell was present at the Battle of Alamance during the Regulator Insurrection on May 16, 1771. He represented Guilford County at the North Carolina Provincial Congress at Halifax in 1776 that wrote and adopted the North Carolina Constitution. He was also a delegate to the Hillsborough Convention in 1788 that considered the U.S. Constitution but failed to ratify it. Rev. Caldwell urged his congregations to volunteer during the American Revolution and War of 1812.

Caldwell was a slaveowner, at one point owning 8 slaves.

== Another David Caldwell ==
The following description of a David Caldwell may have been another David Caldwell, who resided in Iredell County, North Carolina, during the time of the American Revolution, married Rebecca Finney, and moved to Wilson County, Tennessee after the war. This David Caldwell was also depicted in William Sharpe's 1773 map of the Fourth Creek Congregation in Rowan County.

During the American Revolution, a David Caldwell served with the Rowan County Regiment from 1781 to 1783. He was first a major. In 1781, he was promoted to lieutenant colonel under Colonel Francis Locke. On May 1, 1782, he was assigned as a lieutenant colonel in the newly re-created 2nd Rowan County Regiment, where he served until the end of the war. He was at the Battle of Cowpens in South Carolina, where he was wounded; and also fought at the Battle of Haw River.

== Death ==
David Caldwell died on August 25, 1824, in Guilford County, North Carolina, and was buried at the Buffalo Presbyterian Church Cemetery.

== See also ==
- David Caldwell Log College Site

== Sources ==
- Caldwell, David Andrew (2002). "Biography of Rev. David Caldwell (1725-1824)".
- Caruthers, Eli W. (1842). Sketch of the Life of the Rev. David Caldwell. ISBN 1436751306.
- Wheeler, John H. (1851). Historical Sketches of North Carolina.
- Miller, Mark F. (1978). David Caldwell Research Report.
- "North Carolina Historic Marker, DAVID CALDWELL 1725-1824". Archived from the original on April 21, 2019.
