= Marmaduke Norfleet =

American politician

General Assembly of North Carolina
- In office 1731–1742

Justice of the Peace for Perquimans County, North Carolina
- In office March 23, 1734 – March 23, 1735

Personal details
- Born: 1700 Nansemond County, Virginia, US
- Died: June 28, 1774 (aged 73–74) Northampton County, North Carolina, US

Marmaduke Norfleet (1700 – June 28, 1774) was a plantation owner, justice of the peace, and state legislator in North Carolina. He served in the General Assembly of North Carolina during the colonial period.

== Early life ==
Marmaduke Norfleet was born in 1700 in Nansemond County, Virginia, now Perquimons County, North Carolina. He was the son of Mary (née Marmaduke) and Thomas Norfleet Jr., a landowner in Nansemond County, Virginia.

== Career ==
Norfleet acquired large estates in Perquimons County and Northampton County. He was a well-known planter and slave owner in eastern North Carolina.

He represented Perquimans County in North Carolina's General Assembly from 1731 to 1742. Governor Gabriel Johnston appointed him to the position of justice of the peace for Perquimans County from March 23, 1734 to March 23, 1735.

In May 1766, Norfleet sold 1,093.5 acres near the Great Dismal Swamp to George Washington who was a co-partner in the Dismal Swamp Company. This included four tracts that Norfleet had inherited from his father.

== Personal life ==
Norfleet married Elizabeth "Eliza" Gordon in 1720. She was the daughter of John Gordan of Chowan County, North Carolina. Their two sons were Marmaduke Norfleet Jr. and Reuben Norfleet. After his first wife died in 1753, Norfleet married Judith Rhodes. Their two daughters were Sarah Norfleet and Judith Norfleet. They lived in Perquimons County until 1766 when Norfleet purchased and moved to the Rich Square Tract in Northampton County, North Carolina.

Norfleet died at his home on the Rich Square Tract on June 28, 1774. He left a will that was probated in Northampton County in March 1775. There was a dispute over his estate and the division of its slaves that became a court case heard by North Carolina Supreme Court. His estate was worth more than $109,400 ($3,230,759 in 2022 money).
