= John Mare =

English cricketer

Personal information
- Full name: John Matthew Mare
- Born: 22 February 1854; Paddington, London, England
- Died: 11 December 1909 (aged 55); England
- Batting: Right-handed

Domestic team information
- Years: Team
- 1870–1878: Sussex

Career statistics
Competition	First-class
Matches	26
Runs scored	616
Batting average	14.00
100s/50s	–/1
Top score	97
Balls bowled	–
Wickets	–
Bowling average	–
5 wickets in innings	–
10 wickets in match	–
Best bowling	–
Catches/stumpings	9/–
- Source: Cricinfo, 24 January 2012

John Matthew Mare (22 February 1854 – 11 December 1909) was an English cricketer. Mare was a right-handed batsman. He was born at Paddington, London.

Mare made his first-class debut for Sussex against Surrey in 1870. He made 25 further first-class appearances for Sussex, the last of which came against Surrey in 1878. In his 26 first-class matches, he scored a total of 616 runs at an average of 14.00. An opening batsman, he only passed fifty once, narrowly missing out on a century when he scored 97 against Kent in 1872.

He died in England on 11 December 1909, though the exact place of his death is not known.
