= Samuel Spencer (North Carolina politician) =

Lawyer from North Carolina

- Born: January 21, 1734; East Haddam, Connecticut
- Died: March 20, 1793 (aged 59); Anson County, North Carolina
- Spouse: Philippa Peques (1766)
- Children: Mary, Nancy Anne, Claudius, and William Samuel
- Military career
- Allegiance: United States of America
- Branch: North Carolina militia
- Service years: 1775–1776
- Rank: Colonel
- Commands: Anson County Regiment

Samuel Spencer (January 21, 1734 – March 20, 1793) was an American judge, lawyer, and military officer from Anson County, North Carolina.

== Life story ==
Samuel Spencer was born in East Haddan, Connecticut on January 21, 1734. He was the son of Samuel Spencer and Jerusha Brainerd. He graduated from Nassau College (now Princeton University) in 1758. (He later received a LLD from Princeton in 1788.) After graduation in 1758, he moved to the Cheraws District in South Carolina where he married Phillipa Sybil Tisdale. His children were Mary, Nancy Anne, Claudius, and William Samuel Spencer.

He moved to Anson County before 1774 and acquired over 2,000 acres of land in Anson County. He was elected to represent Anson County in the 1st North Carolina Provincial Congress in New Bern in 1774. He was again elected to the 3rd Provincial Congress in August 1775 in Hillsborough and the 4th Provincial Congress in Halifax in April 1776. He was one of three judges appointed to the first North Carolina Supreme Court in 1777. He was on the board of trustees of the University of North Carolina in 1789 and 1790. He was a leader of the Anti-Federalists in the North Carolina Conventions in 1788 (in Hillsborough) and 1789 (in Fayetteville). He was one of three jurists to hear the first case before the North Carolina Superior Court in 1787.

=== Military service ===
Prior to the American Revolution, Samuel was a colonel in the local militia, probably the Anson County Regiment as colonial militia. He was at the Battle of Alamance in 1771 supporting the royal government but his loyalty changed as the time of the American Revolution approached. The North Carolina General Assembly appointed Samuel Spencer as the commandant and colonel of the Anson County Regiment on September 9, 1775. He served in this position until February 1776. He did not lead his soldiers in any known engagement. He was replaced by Colonel Thomas Wade, who took command on March 2, 1776 and remained in command throughout the war.

=== Death ===
Spencer died in 1793 while resting at his home on Smith's Creek in Anson County under unusual circumstances. "It is reported that he had not been well and between court sessions was resting at his home. While sitting on the porch, with a red cap on his head, he became sleepy and began to nod; a large turkey gobbler apparently regarded the moving cap as a challenge and attacked. The justice was thrown from his chair and suffered numerous scratches from which erysipelas developed."

Samuel Spencer's life is detailed as one of three leaders for the Bill of Rights in North Carolina by Albert Coates.
