= Anson County Regiment =

American colonial military unit

- Active: 1775-1783
- Allegiance: North Carolina
- Branch: North Carolina militia
- Type: Militia
- Part of: Salisbury District Brigade

Commanders
- Notable commanders: Col. Samuel Spencer; Col. Thomas Wade

The Anson County Regiment was authorized on September 9, 1775 by the Third North Carolina Provincial Congress. The regiment was engaged in battles and skirmishes against the British and Cherokee during the American Revolution in North Carolina, South Carolina and Georgia between 1776 and 1781. It was active until the end of the war.

== Known officers ==
The commanders/Colonels were:

- Colonel Samuel Spencer (September 9, 1775 to February 1776)
- Colonel Unknown Hicks
- Colonel Charles Medlocke (1776 to 1779, 2nd Colonel), (1775 to 1776, Lieutenant Colonel)
- Colonel Thomas Wade (March 2, 1776 to 1783)

When the British invaded North Carolina in September 1780 and February 1781, Colonel Thomas Wade went to Virginia to avoid capture. After Lord Cornwallis left North Carolina in May 1781, he returned to Anson County. There was a constant threat from Loyalist Colonel David Fanning in the county and very active until 1782.

== Known engagements ==
Known engagements of the Anson County Regiment include:

- February 27, 1776, Battle of Moore's Creek Bridge
- August 1 to November 1, 1776, Cherokee Expedition 1776
- March 3, 1779, Briar Creek, Georgia
- April 14, 1780, Battle of Monck's Corner #1, South Carolina
- March 28 to May 12, 1780, Siege of Charleston 1780. South Carolina
- July 21, 1780, Battle of Colson's Mill
- August 16, 1780, Battle of Camden, South Carolina
- September 9, 1780, Anson County
- September 26, 1780, Battle of Charlotte
- March 15, 1780, Battle of Guilford Court House
- March 31, 1781, Cole's Bridge #2
- August 3, 1781, Piney Bottom Creek
- August 4, 1781, Beatti's Bridge
- August 9, 1781, Richmond & Cumberland Counties
- August 28, 1781, Fanning's Mill
- September 1, 1781, Little Raft Swamp
- September 8, 1781, Battle of Eutaw Springs, South Carolina
- September 13, 1781, Battle of Lindley's Mill
- October 15, 1781, Raft Swamp
- November 15, 1781, Brick House

== See also ==
- List of American Revolutionary War battles
- Salisbury District Brigade
- Southern Campaigns: Pension Transactions for a description of the transcription effort by Will Graves
- Southern theater of the American Revolutionary War

== Bibliography ==
- "A return of the Anson County militia regiment". May 6, 1785.
- Arthur, John Preston, Western North Carolina; a history (1730-1913), National Society Daughters of the American Revolution of North Carolina. Edward Buncombe Chapter, Asheville, North Carolina, Publication date 1914, Link, accessed Jan 29, 2019
- Hunter, C.L.; Sketches of western North Carolina, historical and biographical : illustrating principally the Revolutionary period of Mecklenburg, Rowan, Lincoln, and adjoining counties, accompanied with miscellaneous information, much of it never before published, Raleigh : Raleigh News Steam Job Print, 1877; pages 166-183
- Medley, Mary Louise (1976). Anson County Historical Association (ed.). History of Anson County, North Carolina, 1750-1976. Heritage Printer, Inc., Charlotte, North Carolina. ISBN 9780806347554.
