= John Nisbet (North Carolina patriot) =

American revolutionary patriot

John Nisbet (1738–1817) was a merchant, patriot during the American Revolution, delegate from the newly formed Iredell County, North Carolina to the Fayetteville Convention in 1789 that ratified the Constitution of the United States for North Carolina, and first state senator from Iredell County.

== Early life ==
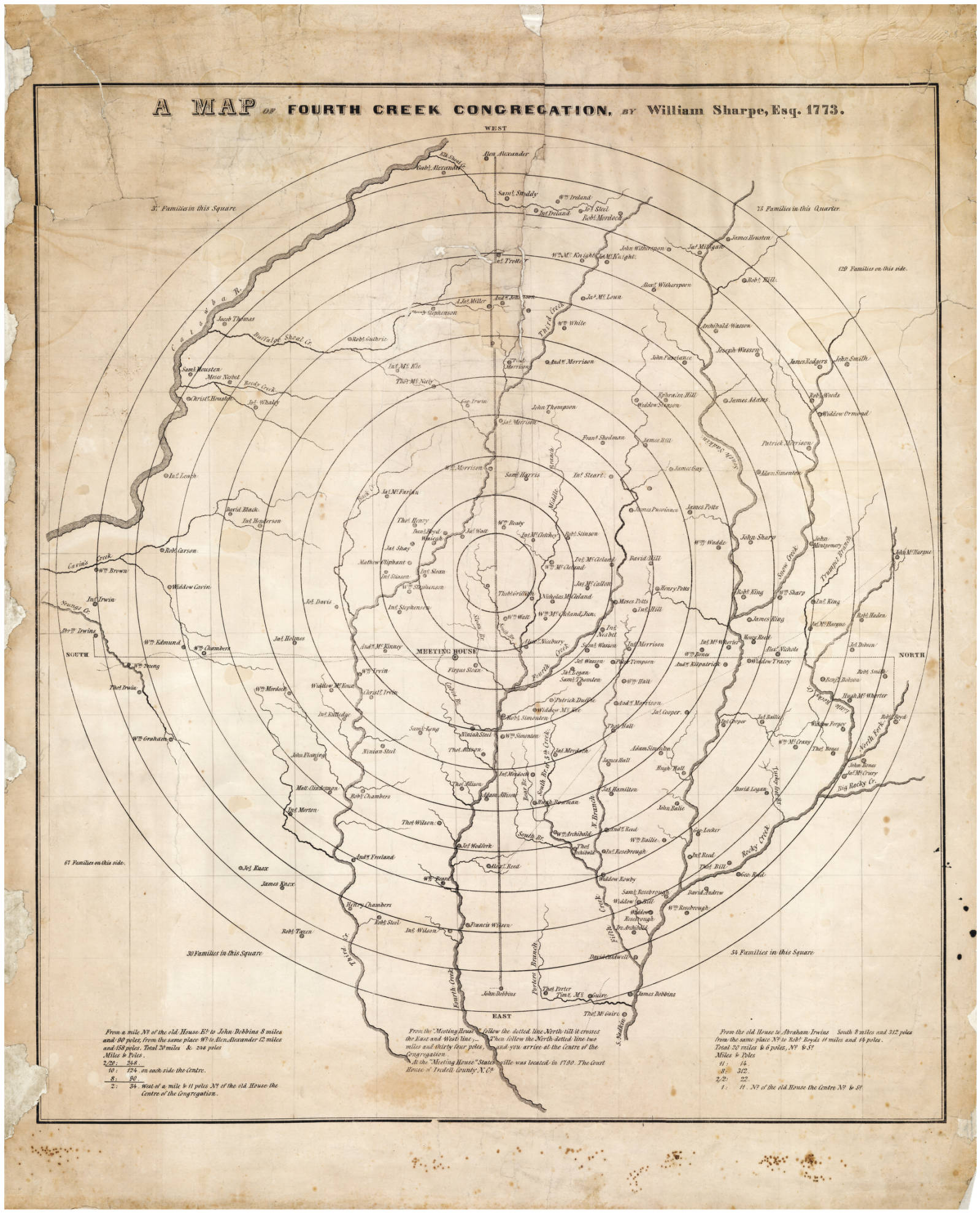
Fourth Creek Congregation showing Jno Nesbit's home along 4th Creek

John Nisbet (sometimes Nesbit) was born in New Jersey in 1738. He was one of six children of John and Sarah Nisbet. In 1759, his family moved from New Jersey to Rowan County, North Carolina (the part that became Iredell County in 1788). He married Mary Osborne, the daughter of Adlai Osborne. They had eight children: James, Nancy, Sarah, Elizabeth, Alexander, John, Milus, and Jane. John operated a store in Statesville, North Carolina and at his plantation four miles northwest of Statesville on Fourth Creek. He was a member of the Fourth Creek Congregation.

== Career ==
In 1774, John was a member of the Rowan County Committee of Safety along with others that became leaders in the North Carolina militia during the American Revolution. Soon after Iredell County was created in 1778, he was chosen as a delegate to the Fayetteville Convention of 1779 that ratified the Constitution of the United States for North Carolina. He served as the first member of the North Carolina Senate from Iredell County in 1789 and again in 1790. In 1790, he was chosen as one of the commissioners to lay out the county seat of Iredell County, Statesville.

He died in Iredell County in 1817.
