= Thomas Wade (North Carolina politician) =

American politician

- Born: 1720 possibly Craven County, North Carolina
- Died: 1786 (aged 65–66)
- Spouse: Jane Boggan (1743)
- Children: Holden, Capt Thomas Wade, Capt George Wade, Mary, and Sarah
- Military career
- Allegiance: United States of America
- Branch: North Carolina militia
- Service years: 1775-1783
- Rank: Colonel
- Commands: Salisbury District Minutemen (1775), Anson County Regiment (1776–1783)
- Conflicts: Battle of Brier Creek

Thomas Wade (1720–1786) was a merchant, commander of the Anson County Regiment of North Carolina militia during the American Revolution, and senator from Anson County in the North Carolina Provincial Congress and General Assembly. Wadesboro, North Carolina was named for him.

== Biography ==
Thomas Wade was born in 1729, possibly in Craven County, North Carolina. His father may have been John Wade, an English emigrant. He married Jane Boggan in 1743. Jane was a sister of Captain Patrick Boggan of Anson County, North Carolina. They had five children. He was a communicant of the Anglican Church.

He received a land grant in Surry County, Virginia in 1746 but returned to live in Granville County, North Carolina in 1747. He moved to Anson County in 1770, where he became a tavern keeper at the courthouse. He served for two two-year terms as justice of the Anson County Court of Pleas and Quarter Sessions. He was chairman of the Anson County Meeting of Freeholders in 1774 and also elected to the Anson County Committee of Correspondence. He was elected as a delegate to the North Carolina Provincial Congress in Hillsborough in August 1775 and in Halifax in November 1776. He was chosen as commissioner for Anson County to supervise prisoners, especially former Loyalists, and to take care of "unhappy women and children."

=== Military service ===
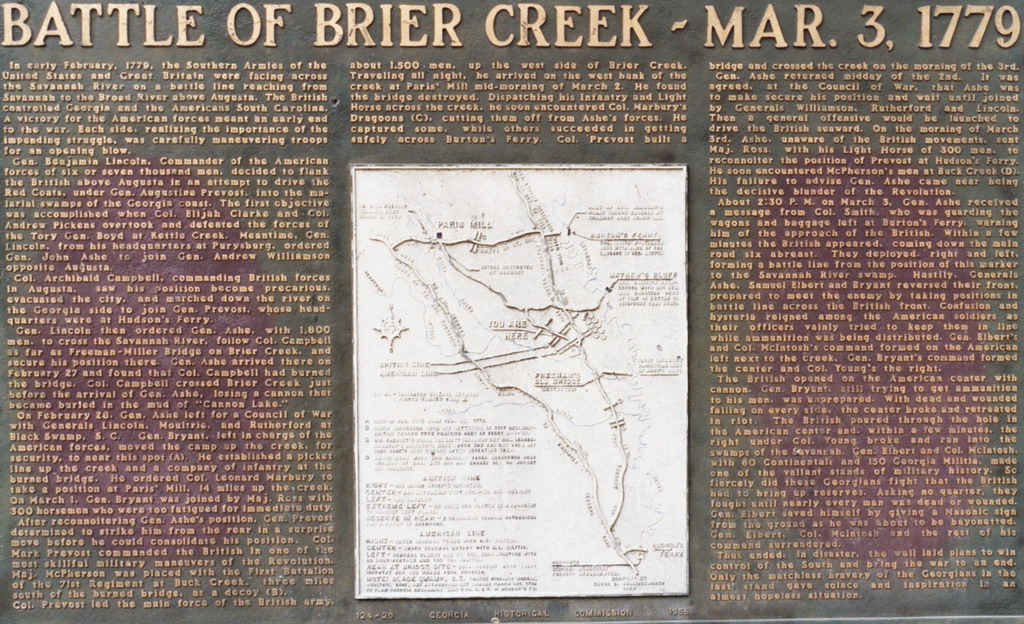
Marker commemorating the Battle of Brier Creek

On September 9, 1775, the North Carolina Provincial Congress appointed him as colonel and commandant of the Salisbury District Minutemen. When the Salisbury District force was split into two battalions on Dec 21, 1775, he was not selected commander of either battalion. The battalions were disbanded in April 1776 in favor of county and district militia. He was selected as colonel and commandant of the Anson County Regiment of the North Carolina militia on March 2, 1776. He retained this position through the end of the war.

He led the Anson County Regiment in the following battles and skirmishes:

- March 3, 1779, Battle of Brier Creek in Georgia
- March 31, 1781, Battle at Cole's Bridge #2 in Richmond County, North Carolina
- August 3, 1781, Massacre of Piney Bottom Creek in Cumberland County, North Carolina
- August 4, 1781, Battle of Beatti's Bridge in Richmond and Bladen Counties, North Carolina
- August 9, 1781, Skirmishes in search of Loyalists in Richmond and Cumberland Counties
- September 1, 1781, Battle of Little Raft Swamp in Bladen County against Colonel David Fanning Loyalists
- September 13, 1781, Battle of Lindley's Mill in Orange County against Colonel David Fanning Loyalists

When the British invaded North Carolina in September 1780 and February 1781, Colonel Thomas Wade went to Virginia to avoid capture. After Lord Cornwallis left North Carolina in May 1781, he returned to Anson County. There was a constant threat from Loyalist Colonel David Fanning in the county and very active until 1782.

== Civilian service ==
He was elected to represent Anson County in the senate of the North Carolina General Assembly in 1780, 1782, and 1783. During these sessions, he was chairman of the committee of State Papers and Petitions. He was on the committee that laid out the streets of Fayetteville in 1783. In 1785, he was the Sheriff of Anson County. He was elected to serve another term in the senate in 1786 but died before he could serve. He was buried in the family burial ground in Mount Pleasant in Anson County. In 1787, the General Assembly voted to change the name of the town of New Town to Wadesboro in his honor.
