= Georgia in the American Revolution =

The Province (and later State) of Georgia in the American Revolution was a significant battleground in the war for independence. Initially, Georgia's population was divided on how to respond to revolutionary activities and heightened tensions in other colonies. As the only colony not represented at the First Continental Congress in 1774, Georgia remained hesitant to join the revolutionary cause, owing to its prosperity under British rule and reliance on British protection against Native American attacks. However, after the outbreak of hostilities in 1775, radical Patriots (also known as Whigs) gained control of the provincial government, driving many Loyalists out and eventually joining the Second Continental Congress.

Georgia played a key role in the southern theater of the war, serving as a staging ground for Patriot raids into British-controlled Florida in 1776 and 1778. The British captured Savannah in 1778, and despite the American and French forces' combined efforts, the Siege of Savannah in 1779 failed to reclaim the city. Georgia remained under British control until their evacuation of Savannah in 1782. Throughout the war, the state witnessed significant battles and skirmishes, such as the Battle of the Rice Boats, the battles of Kettle Creek and Brier Creek, and two sieges of Augusta. The British withdrawal from Savannah marked the restoration of Georgian self-governance, and the state ultimately joined the United States as part of the newly independent nation.

== Beginning of the revolution ==
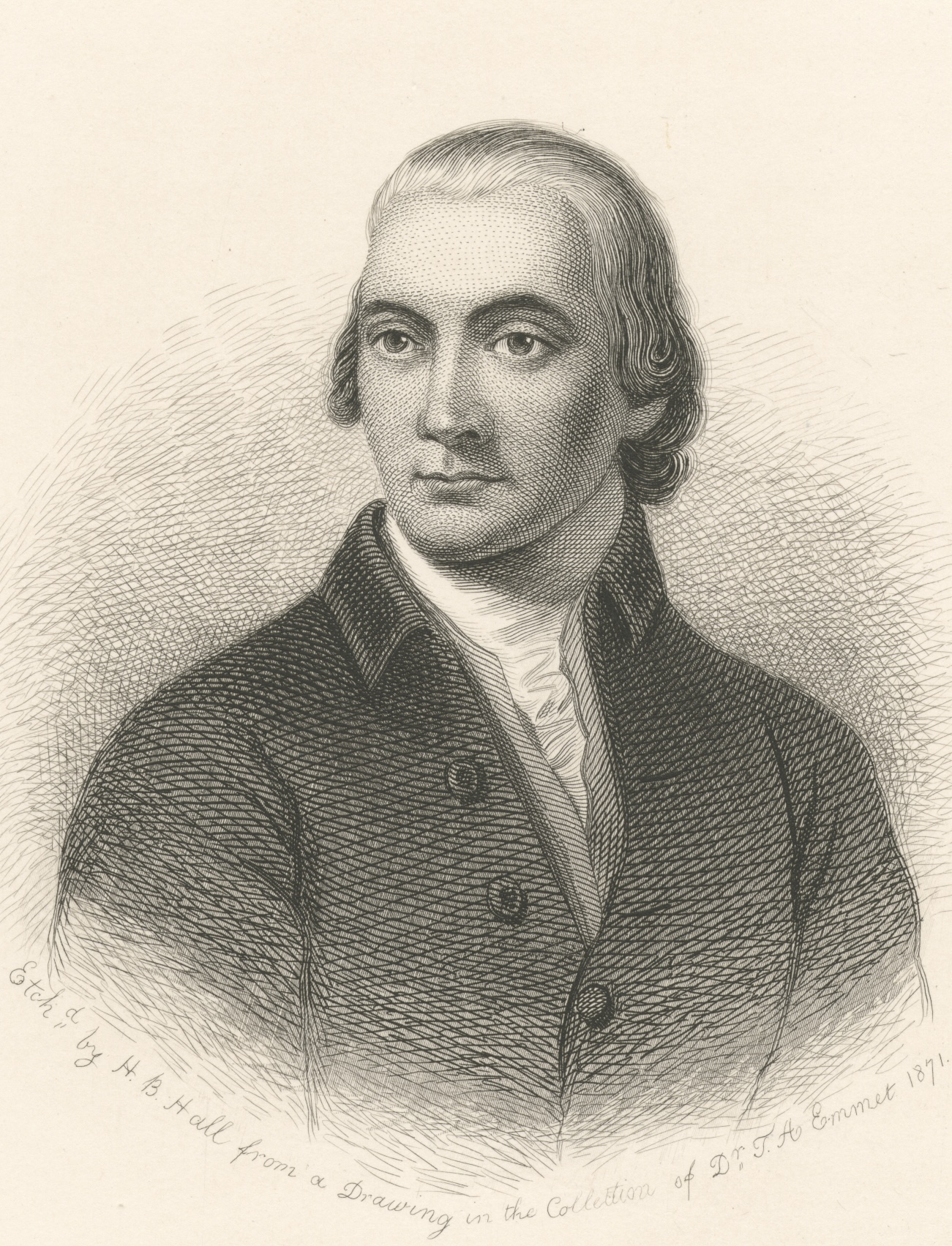
Lyman Hall was the sole Georgia delegate to attend the Continental Congress.

Though Georgians opposed British trade regulations, many hesitated to join the revolutionary movement that emerged in the American colonies in the early 1770s and resulted in the American Revolutionary War (1775–83). The colony had prospered under royal rule, and many Georgians thought that they needed the protection of British troops against a possible Indian attack. Georgia did not send representatives to the First Continental Congress that met in Philadelphia, Pennsylvania, in 1774. The Congress asked all colonies to form a group, called the Association, to ban trade with Great Britain. Georgia delegates gathered in a provincial congress at Tondee's Tavern in Savannah on January 18, 1775, to discuss whether to join the Association and to elect representatives to the Second Continental Congress. Those who were elected declined to go to Philadelphia, however, because the delegates were divided on the action to be taken. St. John Parish, acting alone, sent Lyman Hall to the Second Continental Congress.

News of the battles of Lexington and Concord in Massachusetts caused many Georgians who were wavering in their allegiance to join the radical movement. A group called the Sons of Liberty broke into the powder magazine in Savannah on May 11, 1775, and divided the powder with the South Carolina revolutionaries.

Though Georgians continued to drink to the health of the king, they took the government into their own hands when the Second Provincial Congress met in Savannah on July 4, 1775. The Congress named delegates to the Second Continental Congress, which was already sitting in Philadelphia, and adopted the Association's ban on trade with Britain. The single most important democratic action of the Congress was the establishment of local committees to enforce the Association's ban. Thus political power devolved upon artisans and farmers, considered by the royal governor James Wright to be the "wrong sort" to be allowed in government. The Congress adjourned, leaving executive authority in a standing Council of Safety.

== Violence in the backcountry ==
The heavy-handed tactics of the local committee in Augusta led to the first violence in the backcountry. On August 2, 1775, members of the committee confronted Thomas Brown at his residence on the South Carolina side of the Savannah River above Augusta. Brown had come to Georgia with seventy or so indentured servants in November 1774 in answer to Governor Wright's advertisement of the advantages of the newly Ceded Lands above Augusta and founded a settlement called Brownsborough. He attracted the anger of the Whigs by publicly denouncing the Association and summoning friends of the king to join a counterassociation. When he refused to swear to honor the Association, the crowd of Liberty men tortured him in various ways, scalping and fracturing his skull, burning his feet, and hauling him, unconscious, through the streets of Augusta as an object lesson to those who would denounce the Association.

When he recovered, Brown retired into the Carolina backcountry, where he and other leaders enlisted hundreds of Loyalists and threatened a march on Augusta. After much marching about and some skirmishing around the town of Ninety Six, Brown and his friends heeded South Carolina governor Sir William Campbell's advice to await the arrival of the British. Brown retreated to East Florida and persuaded its governor, Patrick Tonyn, to allow him to recruit a corps of rangers who would lead Indians to fight on the frontiers in conjunction with the expected landing on the coast. Meanwhile, rumors of a British-instigated plot to enlist slaves and Indians to help defeat the American patriots alarmed Georgians and Carolinians. Though false, the rumors were generally believed, and John Stuart, the Indian Commissioner, fled in fear for his life from Charleston, South Carolina, to Florida.

== Battle of the Rice Boats ==
Colonel (later General) Lachlan McIntosh

British warships that arrived in the Savannah River in January 1776 caused the first crisis in Savannah. The Council of Safety, convinced that Savannah was to be the object of a British attack, placed Governor Wright under house arrest and instructed Colonel Lachlan McIntosh to take charge of the defense of the city. There followed the so-called Battle of the Rice Boats on March 2–3, 1776, when British marines seized rice-laden merchant ships in the Savannah harbor, some of which the militia burned. In fact, the object of the British fleet was the acquisition of provisions for the beleaguered army besieged in Boston. The fleet sailed off with some of the rice, along with the fugitive Governor Wright and his chief councilors.

In the absence of the governor, the next provincial congress met in Augusta and proceeded to draft a simple framework of government called "Rules and Regulations" that went into effect on May 1, 1776. The congress elected Archibald Bulloch president and commander in chief of the militia. George Walton joined Lyman Hall and Button Gwinnett as Georgia delegates to the Philadelphia convention in time to sign the Declaration of Independence on July 4, 1776.

== Three invasions of Florida ==
By August, Major General Charles Lee, military commander in the South, allowed himself to be persuaded by Georgians to stage an invasion of British East Florida. Lee had little hope of conquest, but he thought the military demonstration might impress the Indians. Unfortunately, he was recalled to the North, taking his Virginia and North Carolina troops with him, and the expedition got no farther than Sunbury, just south of Savannah, when South Carolina ordered her militia to return. Georgians under Lachlan McIntosh, who was recently promoted to brigadier general, skirmished with the Florida Rangers and their Indian allies on the Satilla River and then abandoned the southern borderlands.

Congress recommended that the newly independent states adopt a permanent frame of government. Accordingly, Georgians elected delegates to a state constitutional convention that met on October 17, 1776, in Savannah. Radical leaders of local committees dominated the convention and produced one of the most democratic constitutions of any state. The electorate included all men over twenty-one who possessed property worth ten pounds or were employed as artisans. A one-house assembly enacted legislation, and elected the governor, judges, and other officials. Georgia's constitution, adopted on February 5, 1777, created the state's first counties: Burke, Camden, Chatham, Effingham, Glynn, Liberty, Richmond, and Wilkes, all named for friends of the colonies in British Parliament, except Liberty, a title that honored St. John Parish's early zeal for American rights.

Button Gwinnett acted as speaker of the convention. He and his fellow radical Whigs suspected many conservative Whigs of being secret Tories. Gwinnett's arrest of George McIntosh, the brother of General Lachlan McIntosh, fueled animosity between radical and conservative Georgians. At the height of the controversy, Gwinnett decided upon an invasion of Florida. Gwinnett considered himself commander in chief of the Georgia militia and refused to cooperate with General McIntosh, who commanded the brigade of Continental soldiers. After the failure of the expedition, the two principals quarreled about which one was to blame. They fought a duel, both were wounded, and Gwinnett died. The radical Whigs raised such a cry against McIntosh that Congress transferred him out of Georgia for service under General George Washington at Valley Forge, Pennsylvania.

The first two failures did not dissuade Georgians from a third attempt upon Florida in 1778. This time Governor John Houstoun commanded the Georgia militia, Major General Robert Howe the Continentals, and General Andrew Williamson the Carolina militia. The expedition suffered from the same lack of coordination that doomed the previous assault on the southern borderlands. Howe's regulars managed to drive Lieutenant Colonel Thomas Brown and his East Florida Rangers from Fort Tonyn on the St. Marys River. The Georgia militia skirmished with the Rangers and a company of Royal Americans on Alligator Creek. With that limited success, the invaders returned to Georgia.

Other than the three abortive invasions of Florida and the patrolling of the western frontier, the Whigs accomplished little during the first three years of independence except survival. However, they gained experience in self-government and a determination not to surrender their new independence, and that was no small achievement. The Indians would have created greater havoc in the backcountry as the result of the instigations of John Stuart and Thomas Brown, but for the efforts of Continental Indian Commissioner George Galphin. Galphin used his enormous influence to persuade many of the Lower Creeks to remain neutral.

== Return of the British Army ==
By 1778, the war in the North had reached a stalemate. The British high command decided to try a southern strategy. Southern governors like Sir James Wright had assured Lord George Germain, the American Secretary in Britain, that hundreds of Loyalists bided their time in the backcountry, waiting for the king's troops. General Sir Henry Clinton in New York ordered Lieutenant Colonel Archibald Campbell to invade Georgia with 3,000 troops and to restore the state to British rule, thus setting an example for the restoration of other former colonies.

Prior to Campbell's attack upon Georgia, General Augustine Prevost conducted a cattle raid into the lower Georgia counties. As a diversion, Lieutenant Colonel Lewis Fuser demonstrated against Fort Morris at Sunbury. When Fuser demanded the surrender of the fort, its commander, Lieutenant Colonel John McIntosh, bravely answered, "Come and take it!" Fuser withdrew and Georgia honored McIntosh as a hero.

On December 28, 1778, Campbell's army landed unopposed on a bluff below Savannah, advanced through the swamps by an unguarded path, and overwhelmed General Robert Howe's defenders of Savannah. Campbell waited until January 12 for the arrival of Prevost's Royal Americans and Brown's Rangers from Florida, and on January 24 began a march with Brown's Rangers to Augusta in the backcountry. Except for a skirmish at the Burke County courthouse involving Brown's Rangers, Campbell was unopposed. Some ninety of George Galphin's slaves sought their freedom from Campbell and were escorted to Savannah.

Campbell took possession of Augusta on January 31, 1779. The southern strategy seemed to be successful when 1,400 men came into Augusta to sign up in the royal militia. However, the British Indian allies were badly delayed, and on February 14 several hundred Loyalists were cut off at Kettle Creek in Wilkes County by South Carolinians under Andrew Pickens and Georgians under Elijah Clarke and John Dooly. Alarmed by the approach of 1,200 North Carolinians under General John Ashe, Campbell withdrew from Augusta on the same day as the Battle of Kettle Creek. Ashe's troops, Samuel Elbert's Georgia Continentals, and Andrew Williamson's South Carolina militia followed the retreating British. On March 3 the British, now commanded by Lieutenant Colonel James Mark Prevost, turned upon the Americans and routed them at the Battle of Brier Creek.

If Kettle Creek ensured the continued independence of upper Georgia, Brier Creek meant that the lower part of the state returned to British rule. Campbell named Prevost acting governor until Sir James Wright's arrival. Campbell then took passage for England, having succeeded in his pledge to remove a star from the American flag. With the regaining of military control, elected representative civil government was restored to the Georgia colonial Assembly through the British writs of 1779, and remained as a functioning body until the evacuation of Governor Sir James Wright in 1782.

General Benjamin Lincoln marched his Continentals to Augusta to support the organization of civil government there, whereupon General Augustine Prevost threatened an attack upon Charleston, drawing Lincoln down with all haste.

== Whig government in Augusta ==
On July 10, 1779, an ad hoc committee met in Augusta and appointed some of its members to a "Supreme Executive Council," whose purpose was to run the government until January, when a full assembly could meet. The Supreme Executive Council held its first meeting on July 24, and the following month the council elected John Wereat president. Wereat, a friend of the McIntoshes, had denounced Georgia's constitution as too radical. Militia colonel George Wells, who served on the committee that drafted the constitution and acted as Gwinnett's second in the fatal duel, refused to recognize Wereat's council and called for regular elections.

In October, Major General Benjamin Lincoln ordered George Walton to go to Augusta, hold an election, and create a constitutional government in order to qualify for a subsidy from the Continental Congress. Walton did so, thereby joining Wells and the radical faction. Elections were held and an assembly met in late November. They chose Walton as governor. Wereat's Supreme Executive Council refused to recognize Walton's administration, so war-ravaged Georgia endured two Whig governments in Augusta and one royal regime in Savannah at a time when it could hardly afford one government.

In the most controversial action of his short-lived administration, Governor Walton dispatched a letter to Congress asking for the second removal of General Lachlan McIntosh from Georgia. McIntosh had returned to the state during the summer to take charge of Georgia's Continental forces, but he resided at the house of a suspected Tory, Andrew McLean. The Assembly passed the resolution, but the Speaker, William Glascock, left Augusta before the clerk transcribed the letter. Walton never denied signing Glascock's name, and he sent another letter under his own name. However, Wereat and other friends of McIntosh's would later carry on an acrimonious investigation of the "forged letter" incident.

The radical faction dominated the new Assembly that met in January 1780. The delegates elected Richard Howley governor and delegate to Congress. The Assembly enacted legislation providing for the rapid growth of the backcountry, including a commission government for Augusta, a new town to be named Washington in Wilkes County, and generous land grants for entrepreneurs who would construct ironworks, grist mills, and sawmills. Howley and Walton traveled as delegates to Philadelphia, and George Wells, president of the executive council, acted as governor. The irascible Wells soon became embroiled in a quarrel with Major James Jackson, a friend of John Wereat's. They fought a duel, and Wells died. Thus, the two leaders of the radical faction in Georgia, Gwinnett and Wells, were killed in duels. They launched Georgia, however, on a democratic course that had lasting effects on the state's history.

== Siege of Savannah ==
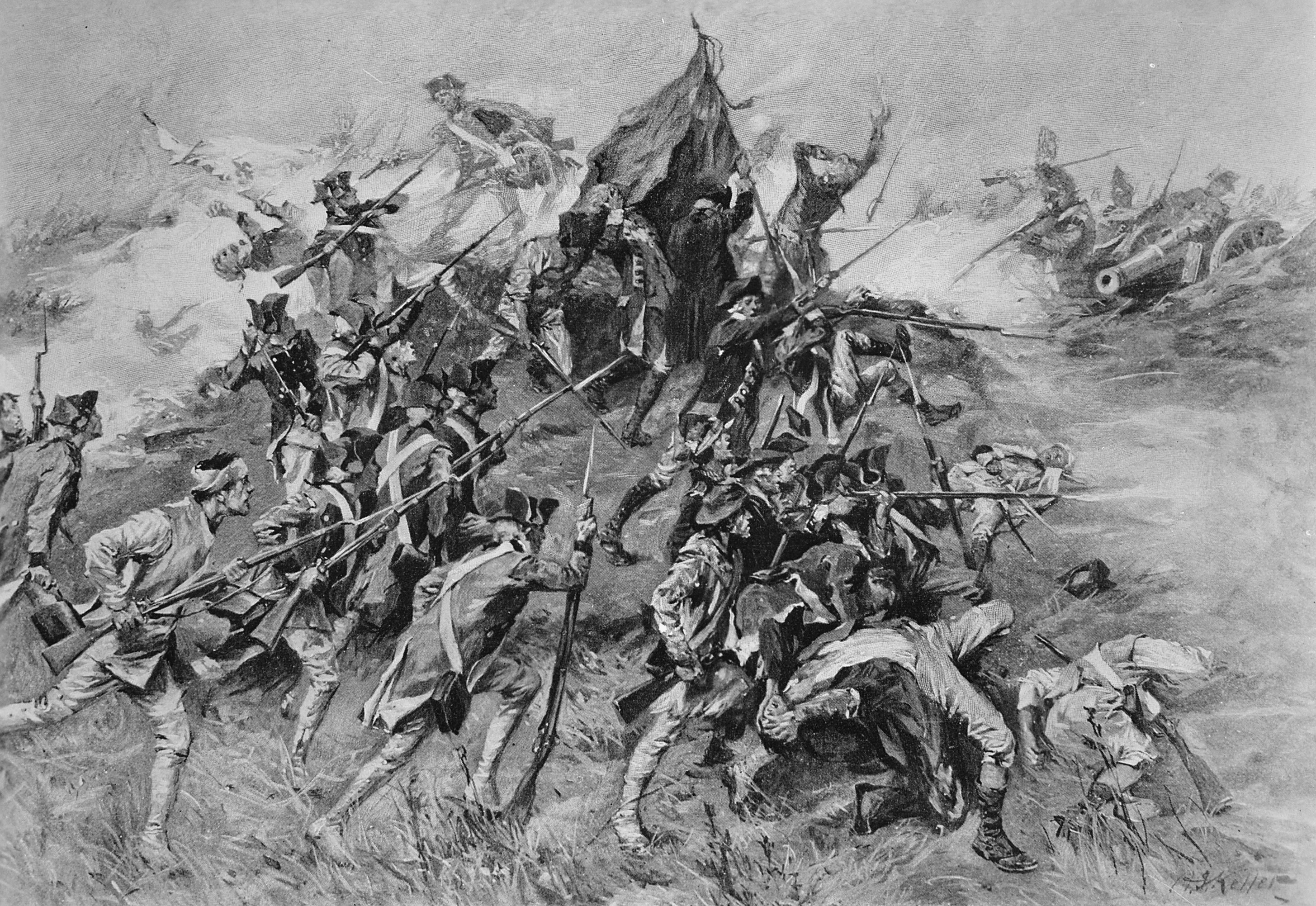
Attack on Savannah by A. I. Keller

Governor Sir James Wright returned to Georgia on July 14, 1779, and announced the restoration of Georgia to the crown, with the privilege of exemption from taxation. Thus, Georgia became the first, and ultimately the only one, of the thirteen states in rebellion to be restored to royal allegiance. Governor Wright had hardly settled into his duties when, on September 3, 1779, a French fleet of twenty-five ships appeared unexpectedly off the Georgia coast. Admiral Charles Henri Hector, Count of Estaing intended to oblige George Washington by stopping off on his way back to France to recapture Savannah. He disembarked his army of 4,000-5,000 men at Beaulieu on the Vernon River and proceeded to besiege Savannah. Major General Benjamin Lincoln hurried over from South Carolina with his army to join in the siege.

D'Estaing demanded the surrender of Savannah on September 16, but General Augustine Prevost asked for twenty-four hours to give an answer. During that day, Lieutenant Colonel John Maitland brought 800 British regulars in from Beaufort, South Carolina, to bolster the British defenses. Then Prevost declined to surrender.

On October 9, 1779, the allies launched a grand assault upon the British lines and suffered 752 casualties, while the British defenders lost only 18 killed and 39 wounded. Count Casimir Pulaski, a Polish nobleman who had volunteered to fight for the American cause, died at the head of the men he led. Sergeant William Jasper, a hero of the 1776 Battle of Sullivan's Island, also died. The battered French army withdrew to its ships, and Benjamin Lincoln's troops returned to Charleston.

== Fall of Charleston ==
Encouraged by the British defense of Savannah, General Sir Henry Clinton brought his army down from New York, made Tybee Island his base, and began the siege of Charleston. Lincoln failed to escape when he might have, and surrendered the city and its defenders on May 12, 1780. Clinton then returned to New York, leaving General Lord Cornwallis in charge of the subjugation of the South. Cornwallis sent units to take command of the backcountry posts, including Augusta, Camden, and Ninety Six. Lieutenant Colonel Thomas Brown assumed command in Augusta.

On July 10, 1780, the Royal Council in Savannah declared that peace had been restored in Georgia, and so it seemed, with a British garrison in Savannah under Lieutenant Colonel Alured Clarke, and British posts in the backcountry. Some Whigs refused to surrender, however, and sought refuge in the mountain country.

== Two battles of Augusta ==
Gangs of marauders roamed the region between Savannah and Augusta. More importantly, Lieutenant Colonel Elijah Clarke came down from his haven in North Carolina, rallied 600 men who had taken a recent oath of allegiance to the king, and attacked Augusta on September 14, 1780. In a desperate four-day battle Clarke besieged Brown and his Rangers and Indian allies at the Mackay House outside town. Lieutenant Colonel John Harris Cruger and his New York Loyalists from Ninety-Six came to the relief of Brown's garrison. Though tradition blames Brown for hanging thirteen prisoners, Cruger probably gave the order to carry out the punishment mandated by Cornwallis for those who took up arms after swearing allegiance to the king.

Clarke beat a hasty retreat to North Carolina, hounded by Indians and Loyalists. Cornwallis dispatched a force of Loyalists under Lieutenant Colonel Patrick Ferguson to cut off Clarke's band. Instead, Clarke's friends from the mountains swarmed down under their own leaders, caught Ferguson on Kings Mountain, and scored a decisive victory on October 7, 1780. Clarke's raid upon Augusta triggered the events that led to Kings Mountain.

Alarmed by the resurgence of the Whigs under leaders like Clarke, Benjamin Few, and John Twiggs, Brown constructed Fort Cornwallis on the grounds of St. Paul's Church. In April Clarke returned to the Georgia backcountry to harass Loyalists and threaten Augusta. Major General Nathanael Greene, the new Continental commander in the South, ordered General Andrew Pickens and his South Carolina militia, and Lieutenant Colonel Henry "Lighthorse Harry" Lee with his legion, to join Clarke in besieging Augusta. Lee captured valuable stores at Galphin's plantation at Silver Bluff and, with Pickens and Clark, began the siege of Augusta on May 22, 1781. In the course of a two-week battle, Lee's engineers constructed a wooden tower from which a cannon could reach the interior of Fort Cornwallis. Brown had no choice but to surrender on June 5, 1781. The capture of Augusta gave American peace negotiators in Paris reason to demand the independence of Georgia even though Savannah remained in British hands for the ensuing year.

== Whig government restored ==
For the first time in more than a year, the scattered members of the legislature reassembled in Augusta on August 17 and elected Nathan Brownson governor for the remainder of the year. General Greene authorized the creation of 100 horse and 100 foot under the title of the "Georgia State Legion" with Lieutenant Colonel James Jackson in command. On January 9, 1782, Greene dispatched Brigadier General Anthony Wayne to Georgia with a regiment of dragoons. General Wayne conducted a war of attrition against the British defenders of Savannah. Andrew Pickens carried the war to the Cherokees and John Twiggs's Georgians fought against the Creeks.

On January 2, 1782, the legislature elected John Martin governor. He issued a proclamation pardoning all loyalists who pledged to support independence by joining the Georgia Legion or the militia. On May 4, 1782, the legislature passed the Confiscation and Banishment Act, declaring 277 people guilty of treason, and seizing their property. The property of Loyalists who had left the state was also confiscated.

Governor Wright bitterly criticized the British military for not supporting the royal cause in Georgia. On June 4, 1782, he staged an elaborate celebration in Savannah to honor the king's birthday and to keep up the spirits of Georgia Loyalists. On June 14, 1782, however, Wright received orders from General Sir Guy Carleton to evacuate Savannah. Thomas Brown had recruited a new regiment of rangers, and on May 19, skirmished with Lieutenant Colonel James Jackson's Legion in the marshes outside Savannah. At Wright's request, Brown had sent a last, desperate appeal to the Upper Creeks to come to his aid. On June 23, the noted Creek leader Emistisiguo fought through the American lines to reach Savannah. Though most of his band joined Brown, Emistisiguo was killed.

== Evacuation of Savannah ==
The British evacuated Savannah on July 11, 1782. Lieutenant Colonel James Jackson had the honor of leading Wayne's victorious troops into the city. Governor Martin convened the Georgia Assembly in Savannah on July 13, 1782. As many as 2,000 white Georgians and twice that number of Blacks resettled in British East Florida. About 400 whites and 5,000 blacks migrated to Jamaica, where Sir Archibald Campbell, who had restored Georgia to the crown, served as governor. The Loyalists in Florida had hardly settled to their new life when they learned that the peace treaty of 1783 returned Florida to Spain. There occurred another mass migration to the Bahamas, Jamaica, and the other islands of the West Indies, as well as to Great Britain.

On January 7, 1783, the Georgia General Assembly elected Lyman Hall governor. John Twiggs, now raised to the rank of general in the Georgia militia, and Elijah Clarke continued to harass the Cherokee and Creek Indians to ensure the possession of land, the great object of the revolution for many Georgians. News of the signing of the preliminary peace treaty reached Savannah in late May 1783 and caused a general celebration. The newly independent state of Georgia, though poor in every other respect, claimed a virtual empire of territory reaching to the Mississippi River, which was disputed by the Creek Indians, who actually possessed the land.
