= King's Carolina Rangers =

Loyalist militia in the American Revolution

- Active: 1776-1783
- Country: Great Britain
- Allegiance: Great Britain
- Branch: British Provincial unit
- Type: Infantry
- Nickname: Brown's Rangers
- Engagements: Defence of Fort Tonyn, Battle of Kettle Creek, Battle of Brier Creek, Battle of Hanging Rock, Defence of Savannah, Siege of Augusta

Commanders
- Notable commanders: Lt. Col Thomas Brown

The King's Carolina Rangers (KCR) was a loyalist militia regiment active during the American War of Independence. The KCR was composed of nine infantry companies, of which one was converted into a troop of dragoons in 1782. The unit primarily saw action in the South Carolina and Georgia theatres of the conflict.

== Beginnings ==
After fleeing a particularly violent tarring and feathering by Patriots outside of Augusta, Georgia, Thomas Brown sought refuge among loyalists in East Florida in 1775. In June 1776, Brown received authorisation from Governor Patrick Tonyn to form and lead a loyalist unit to be named the East Florida Rangers. The East Florida Rangers were mounted on horseback, but were not a cavalry unit per se, using their horses not for fighting but for transportation over the great distances in the region.

Following their formation, the contributions of the East Florida Rangers primarily concerned scouting the woods, assisting refugees in reaching the safety of East Florida, defending frontier settlements, gathering provisions, plundering farms, and stealing cattle to feed refugees who had fled to the colony. William Henry Drayton, who served as a delegate for South Carolina to the Continental Congress, referred to the rangers as "splitshirt banditti" and a parcel of horse thieves and villains.

In June 1778, the East Florida Rangers partook in the effort to defend Fort Tonyn from a Continental invasion led by General Robert Howe. Seventy-six members of the East Florida Rangers, led by Lt. James Moore, attempted to flank the advancing American army. Moore's plans were however leaked and the East Florida Rangers were ambushed. Lt. Moore fell in the attack.

== 1779 ==
In 1779 the East Florida Rangers were reorganised into a regiment of infantry, becoming the King's Carolina Rangers on the orders of Brigadier-general Augustine Prevost. The unit continued to be led by Lt. Col. Thomas Brown.

In January 1779, The KCR formed part of the British force which took Augusta. Weeks later in February, they assisted during the Battle of Kettle Creek during the British retreat from Augusta. The KCR then partook in the decisive British victory at the Battle of Brier Creek.

In April, the KCR formed part of the vanguard of General Provost's advance on Charleston before being assigned to Ebenezer, Georgia in July.

In September, the KCR were deployed on the extreme right on the British line during the successful defence of Savannah.

== 1780 ==
In June 1780, the KCR led the British advance from Savannah to retake Augusta. With the city captured, the KCR became responsible for patrolling the surrounding area and suppressing patriot activity. In August, the unit partook in the defeat at the Battle of Hanging Rock.

Following the repelling of an attack on Augusta in September, the KCR fortified their position with the construction of Fort Cornwallis adjacent to Saint Paul's Church.

== 1781 ==
In April a patriot militia force led by Micajah Williamson set up camp in close proximity to Augusta. Lt. Col. Brown, commanding a force of approximately 300 militiamen and 200 African Americans, refused to engage due to exaggerated reports of the patriot's strength. In May, Williamson was joined by Elijah Clarke and Henry 'Light Horse Harry' Lee, bringing with them additional troops. General Andrew Pickens and 400 American troops managed to cut off relief forces sent to alleviate Fort Cornwallis at Ninety Six, allowing for the Siege of Augusta to begin.

On May 23 nearby Fort Grierson fell, leaving the KCR and Lt. Col. Thomas Brown isolated, albeit well defended, in Fort Cornwallis. The besieging army only had one cannon and proved ineffective against the forts walls. To counter this, the patriots constructed a 30 feet (9.1 m) high wooden tower in order to allow their singular cannon to fire down into the fort. The KCR made several sorties to prevent its construction however were repelled each time.

On June 1 the tower was high enough to prove effective, knocking the KCR's guns off of their mounts and destroying the barracks. On June 4 the patriots assault Fort Cornwallis and demanded surrender. Lt. Co. Brown refused due to it being the King's birthday.

On June 5 Lt. Col. Brown negotiated a surrender and was taken prisoner alongside the rest of the KCR. Brown was then paroled, alongside most of his troops, by Nathanael Green and escorted to Savannah on the agreement they would not re-enter the war.

== 1782 ==
Following defeat at Augusta, the KCR was again put on to active duty, partaking in a number of small skirmishes throughout Georgia. With the evacuation of Savannah in July, the KCR embarked for Charleston, where they remained until October. Then, with the Royal North Carolina Regiment and the South Carolina Royalists, they embarked for St. Augustine to garrison East Florida.

== 1783 ==
The KCR spent most of the year garrisoned in St. Augustine. The unit was then ‘decommissioned’ in late 1783 following the signing of the Treaty of Paris and the cessation of hostilities. Individuals serving in the KCR were unable to remain in Florida owing to the agreed transfer of the state to Spain by Britain. As a result, those who served sought to resettle elsewhere in the British Empire. A popular destination was Nova Scotia in British Canada where the unit had received a land grant outside of Country Harbour.
