= Daniel McGirt =

18th century outlaw gang leader in Florida & Georgia, USA

- Born: c. 1750; Camden District, Province of South Carolina
- Died: 1804
- Other names: McGirtt, McGirth
- Spouse(s): Mary, Susannah or Susana (Susan)
- Children: Daniel McGirt, Jr., John Robert McGirt
- Relatives: James McGirt, Sr. (father)
- Military career
- Allegiance: Patriot, then Loyalist
- Branch: Militia
- Rank: Colonel

Daniel McGirt, also given as McGirtt or McGirth, (c. 1750–1804), a native of the Camden District in South Carolina, was the leader of an outlaw gang that operated in northern Florida and southern Georgia during the latter 18th-century. Mostly uneducated, he made a living as a hunter and trapper until the American Revolutionary War broke out, whereupon he served for a while as a scout for the Continental Army, then switched sides, and became one of the more picturesque minor figures of the war.

== Early years ==
Daniel McGirt was born to James McGirt and Priscilla Davison; the family was respected and well-established in the Camden area. His father was a prosperous miller who had acquired a grant on the Wateree River of 400 acres of land five miles below Camden, at the horseshoe bend in the river then called the "Great Neck, near Mulberry. McGirt was probably born here at the plantation the family called the “Hermitage”, though most of his father's lands seem to have been lower downstream.

Wells' Register and Almanac for 1775 records that James McGirt held offices of trust and confidence, serving as a lieutenant-colonel in Richard Richardson's regiment of the provincial militia. It was probably he, and not his son Daniel as stated in the South Carolina Gazette of April, 1769, who, with Cols. Richardson and William Thompson, acted with such "great spirit, discretion and success" in suppressing the Schofield provocations on the Saluda River. The Gazette characterizes the three colonels as "gentlemen of great reputation and highly esteemed by the whole body of backsettlers." The elder McGirt later served as a court justice, and one of his daughters married Capt. John Cantey, the founder of the Camden branch of that family.

Dr. Joseph Johnson says in his book, Traditions and Reminiscences, Chiefly of the American Revolution in the South, that the elder McGirt supported the American cause throughout the war, but there is no evidence to confirm this. Kirkland and Kennedy, authors of Historic Camden: Colonial and Revolutionary, are inclined to believe that he remained true to the Crown, and retired with his family to East Florida around the beginning of the conflict. This might be inferred from a letter written by William Ancrum, who lived in Charleston but was one of the largest landowners in the Camden area, and who knew all the families thereabouts. It is directed to his agent at the Congarees, on May 9, 1778, and concerns the recent stealing of three slaves from his plantation at that location. He writes:

"It is suspected that some of the McGirts who were formerly settled near Camden and some time ago retired to East Florida and who, it seems, have given themselves up to these scandalous practices are the perpetrators of this villainy, who have also taken off with them a great many horses from the settlements on the Wateree River." It is unlikely that James McGirt, given his reputed character, would have participated in these thefts; it was almost certainly another son, James, Jr., who joined Daniel McGirt in his misdeeds.

== Scout for the Continental Army ==
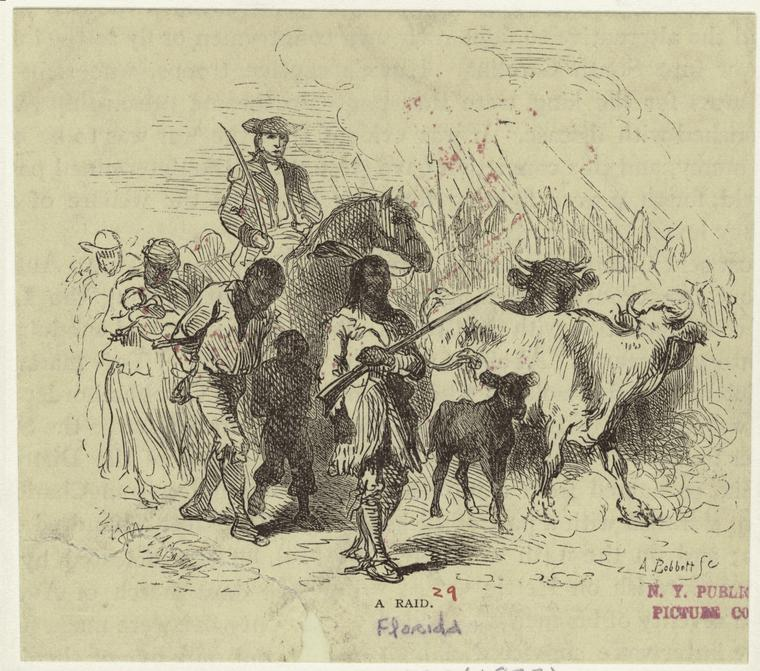
Wood engraving by Albert Bobbett, 1877, depicts a raid by the East Florida Rangers or "Florida Scout"

In the early days of the Revolutionary War, Charles and Jermyn Wright, brothers of Georgia's Governor Wright, built a fort at their plantation on the Florida side of the St. Marys River. This fort, which was named Fort Tonyn after the governor of East Florida, Patrick Tonyn, became a refuge for the Tories of Georgia, from which they made numerous raids on the southern settlements of that province. In mid-May 1776, Capt. John Baker marched against the fort with 70 mounted men. His plan was to wait until nightfall, surprise the fort by a sudden assault and then make a rapid retreat. His movements were conducted with great secrecy, but his approach was discovered by a slave, who alerted the fort's defenders.

Three cannon were fired from the fort and were answered by the schooner St. John of eight guns lying in the river a short distance below. Baker, surmising that this was a signal for reinforcements from the schooner, placed his men in ambush along the banks and fired on the boats as they came up the stream. Several of the British were killed, wounded or captured, and from one of the prisoners Baker learned that a large body of Indians was encamped near the fort. He then retreated eight or nine miles before making camp for the night. During the darkness two of his men, Daniel and James McGirth, stole nearly all the horses belonging to the company and deserted to the enemy. The loss of the horses caused the failure of the expedition and Baker returned north to Georgia. For his act of daring Daniel McGirth was later made a lieutenant colonel in the Florida Rangers.

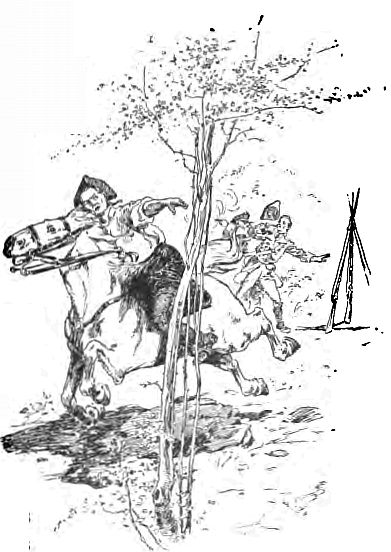
Illustration by A.B. Frost of Daniel McGirth escaping from jail on his fleet mare, "Grey Goose", from a Joel Chandler Harris book

Dr. Johnson recounts a tradition purporting to explain the reason for young McGirt's desertion of the patriot cause. He says that as a young man, Daniel McGirt was an accomplished hunter and rider, intimately familiar with the woods and trails from the Santee River to the lands of the Catawba Nation. He was a valuable scout to the Americans, as much for his courage as for his accurate knowledge of the countryside.

McGirt's driving passion before the war had been the breeding and racing of fine horses. His favorite mount was an iron-grey mare that he called “Grey Goose”. At Fort Mcintosh, a militia lieutenant, Clarke Christie, coveted the horse, and offered McGirt a lieutenant's commission in exchange for it, but he was refused. Not being able to get the horse by other means, Christie swore that he would have her by force. The threat led to a confrontation in which Daniel either struck the officer or threatened to do so. For this he was court-martialed and found guilty of striking an officer, a very serious offense, then publicly whipped with ten lashes and confined in the local jail. By the terms of his sentence, two more whippings were subsequently to be inflicted. Stung by this disgrace, McGirt determined to escape, and succeeded by dislodging the window bars of his cell with a broken trowel probably passed to him by a guard. Mounting “Grey Goose”, who happened to be tethered nearby, he dashed away, turning in his saddle as he rode off to hurl threats of vengeance. McGirt fled to St. Augustine, the capital of East Florida and a Loyalist haven, where he was made a lieutenant colonel in Thomas Brown's East Florida Rangers.

== Loyalist raider ==
Daniel McGirt was attached to Brig. Gen. Augustine Prevost's army on its devastating raid of 1779 through lower Carolina in which plantations were laid waste and robbed of all their valuables— live stock, silver plate, provisions, and enslaved blacks.

Commenting on this, the Gazette of July 7, 1779, says that with Prevost was:

" ... a large body of the most infamous banditti and horse thieves that perhaps ever were collected together anywhere, under the direction of McGirt (dignified with the title of colonel), a corps of Indians, with Negro and white savages disguised like them, and about 1,500 of the most savage disaffected poor people, seduced from the back settlements of this State and North Carolina."

Again, on July 28, 1779, the same journal remarks:

"A report prevailed that Brig.- Gen. Prevost was ordered to New York under an arrest for not having done more mischief in this State than he did. But, if it be true that he was in copartnership to share all plunder, whether in plate, horses, or Negroes, with the famous McGirt (as was confidently affirmed by most of the British officers while they were in this neighborhood), the general will have no cause to regret even a dismissal from their service, for McGirt himself has declared that his own share of what he has stolen amounting to his weight in gold, he is now satisfied and will immediately quit his thieving and settle in West Florida."

One of Daniel McGirt's alleged acts of daring was commonly believed to have given a name to a locality in his home province. It was said that with a companion he once ventured to make a secret reconnaissance in the swamps on the western side of the Wateree River. Some patriots of the area, learning of his presence, determined to entrap him. Suspecting that he would wish to cross a creek with very high banks, on the Bettyneck plantation ten miles below Camden, they removed the only bridge at that point and concealed themselves on either side of the way. McGirt and his comrade rode blindly into the ambuscade, but, putting spurs to their horses, passed unscathed by the musketry fire until they reached the chasm. Retreat was impossible, so both urged their horses to the leap, the distance from bank to bank being about twenty feet. McGirt passed safely over, but his attendant perished in the attempt. The stream has since been known as “Jumping Gully.” Despite this tradition, a plat of James McGirt's lands in the Fork of the Wateree, made May 4, 1756, shows that this stream was, even at that early date, already known as “Jumping Gully.” After the war, McGirt took his band of brigands to Florida, where they seem to have maintained themselves for a while by their wits and skillful use of their weapons.

The contemporary Charleston papers provide occasional glimpses of McGirt and his band. The South Carolina Gazette and Public Advertiser of April 3, 1784, says: “By a gentleman arrived this week from St. Augustine, we learn that the notorious McGirt, who came into this State with Prevost's army in 1779 and committed numberless depredations on the inhabitants, is confined in the castle of that place for several robberies committed by him and his party in that province.”

The historian David Ramsay summarizes McGirt's career thus:

“Mr. Tonyn, governor of the last-mentioned loyal province (East Florida), granted a commission to a horse-thief of the name of McGirt, who, at the head of a party, had for several years harassed the inhabitants of South Carolina and Georgia. By his frequent incursions, he had amassed a large property that he deposited in the vicinity of St. Augustine. After peace was proclaimed, he carried on the same practices against his former protectors in East Florida, until they were obliged, in self-defense, to raise the royal militia of the province to oppose him.”

After Gen. Cornwallis and Col. Tarleton defeated Gen. Gates and the Patriot forces at the Battle of Camden in 1780, McGirt and his fellow Loyalist Rangers Thomas Brown and William Cunningham returned to South Carolina from their exile in East Florida to exact revenge for the mistreatment they had suffered at the hands of their former neighbors.

During and after the war, McGirt led an interracial gang that relied on corrupt government, intimidation of local officials, and election fraud to avoid accountability for their thefts of livestock and other property, as well as the kidnapping of slaves, in Georgia. They terrorized the populace with rape and violence, using the international border between that state and East Florida to escape justice.

With the proclamation of Britain's return of Florida to Spain by terms of the Treaty of Paris in 1783, disorder and confusion were rampant in East Florida. Lawless men took advantage of the situation to raid plantations and houses along the lower St. Johns River, looting slaves, provisions, and livestock. The most notorious among them was the gang led by McGirt, who had assembled a band of mounted men, mostly refugees and vagrants, with the Loyalist John Linder from the South Carolina Lowcountry as his chief lieutenant. To protect the settlers from the "banditti", as he called them, Governor Tonyn raised two troops of light horse under the command of Lt. Col. William Young, and ordered him to bring the marauders to justice, characterizing them as "murderers and assassins".

When the bandits William Cunningham, Stephen Mayfield, and Daniel Cargill were implicated in the theft of silver and other valuables from houses at St. John's Towne (St. John's Bluff), Governor Zéspedes had them and McGirt arrested and thrown into the Castillo de San Marcos (St. Mark's Castle). The prisoners were transported to Havana in late April 1785, along with papers containing the petitions for leniency recommended by Tonyn and a decree of exile issued by Zéspedes. These were forwarded to Bernardo de Gálvez, the Captain General of Cuba, who had gone to Mexico to take office as the newly appointed Viceroy of New Spain. Gálvez approved their banishment, and ordered that the prisoners be permitted to emigrate to any non-Spanish territory and to take their families and property with them. A few weeks later the troublemakers left Havana with passports for New Providence in the Bahamas; Mayfield arrived, but McGirt and Cunningham had jumped ship and landed on the East Florida coast. They were soon caught and again put aboard a ship to New Providence.

== Later years ==
The history of McGirt's later years is uncertain. McGirt's confinement for several years in the damp dungeons of the fortress permanently damaged his health. Kirkland and Kennedy assert that he abandoned his life of adventure and outlawry, seeking asylum at the home of his brother-in-law, Col. John James, of Sumter District in South Carolina, where his wife, a sister of Colonel James, had lived in seclusion during the war, faithful to her husband. Supposedly McGirt passed the remaining years of his life peacefully in her company, his identity carefully concealed. Part of this time was passed under the protection of his nephews, Zachary and James Cantey, in Camden.

The Georgia historian Lucian Lamar Knight agrees that McGirt was ill and retired to Sumter District in South Carolina, where he soon died, while Joseph Johnson also gives the story that Daniel McGirt ended his checkered career at the home of Col. James, in misery but not in want, and that his widow long survived him. However, a land grant by Enrique White, the governor of East Florida, dated 20 November 1797, gives Daniel McGirt permission to return to Florida and settle on his father's lands. He was found living on those tracts in Nassau along the St. Marys River in the general survey made by the Spanish government in 1801. There is an entry in the baptismal records of the Catholic church at St. Augustine recording the birth of John Robert McGirt to Daniel McGirt and Susana Ashley in that city on 4 September 1798. In spite of his several arrests over the years for capital crimes, McGirth was able to use his political connections to such good effect that he had a peaceful death in 1804 as a free man in Camden County, Georgia.
