= Capture of Savannah =

1778 battle of the American Revolutionary War

- Part of the American Revolutionary War
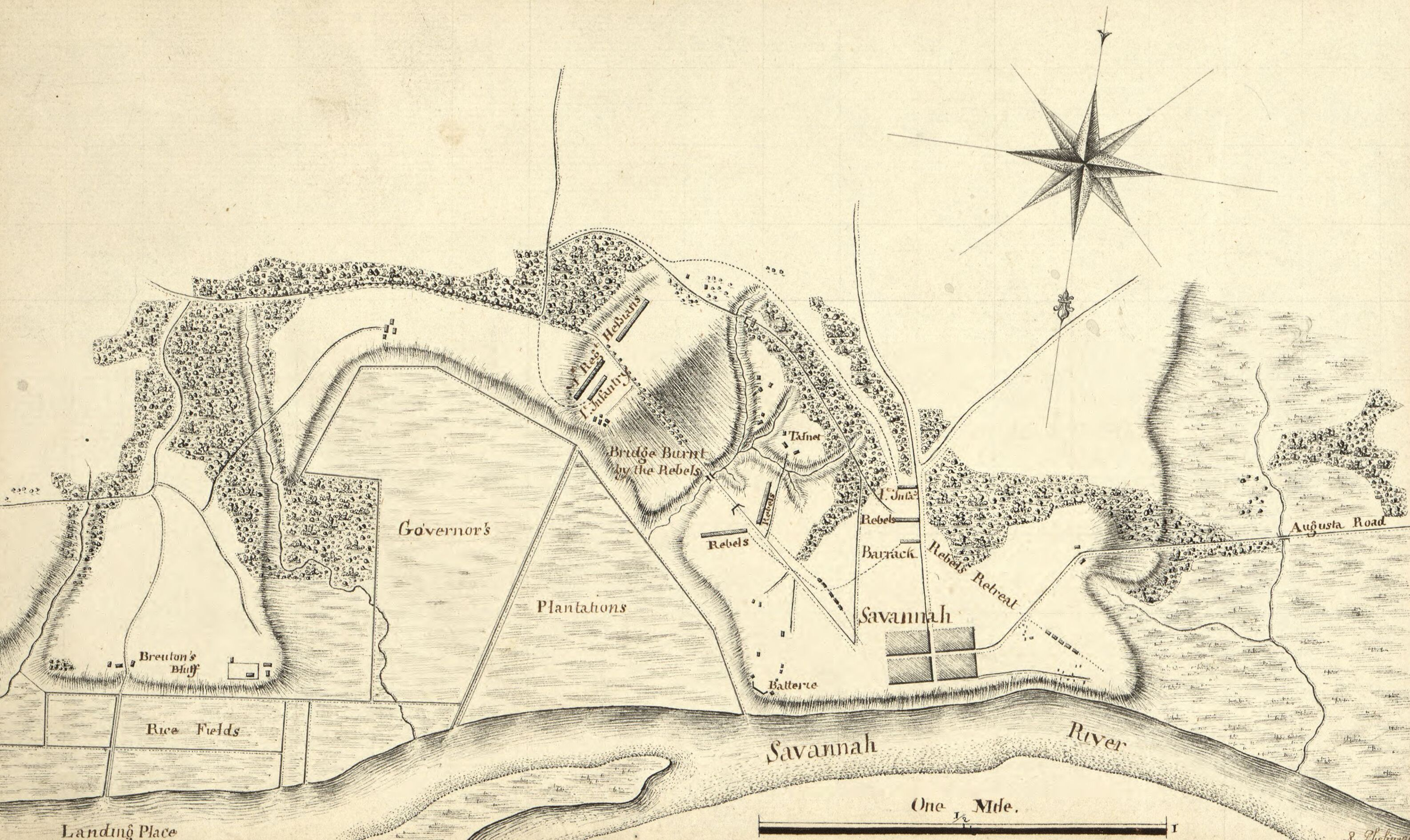
- Illustration of military movements during the battle
Date	December 29, 1778
Location	Savannah, Georgia 32°03′03″N 81°06′14″W
Result	British victory

Belligerents
Great Britain	United States

Commanders and leaders
Archibald Campbell	Robert Howe

Strength
3,500 regulars	850 regulars and militia

Casualties and losses
7 killed 17 wounded	83 killed 11 wounded 453 captured

The capture of Savannah (also known as the First Battle of Savannah and the Battle of Brewton Hill) was a battle of the American Revolutionary War fought on December 29, 1778. It pitted an American garrison of Continental Army and militia units against a British invasion force commanded by Lieutenant-colonel Archibald Campbell. The capture of the city led to an extended occupation and was the opening move in the British southern strategy to regain control of the rebellious Southern Colonies by appealing to the relatively strong Loyalist sentiment there.

General Sir Henry Clinton, the Commander-in-Chief, North America, dispatched Campbell and a 3,100-strong force from New York City to capture Savannah, and begin the process of returning Georgia to British control. He was to be assisted by troops under the command of Brigadier-General Augustine Prevost that were marching up from Saint Augustine, Florida. After landing near Savannah on December 23, Campbell assessed the American defenses, which were comparatively weak, and decided to attack without waiting for Prevost. Taking advantage of local assistance he flanked the American position outside the city, captured a large portion of Major-General Robert Howe's army, and drove the remnants to retreat into South Carolina.

Campbell and Prevost followed up the victory with the capture of Sunbury and an expedition to Augusta. The latter was occupied by Campbell only for a few weeks before he retreated to Savannah, citing insufficient Loyalist and Native American support and the threat of Patriot forces across the Savannah River in South Carolina. The British held off a Franco-American siege in 1779, and held the city until late in the war.

== Background ==
In March 1778, following the capture of a British army at Saratoga and the consequent entry of France into the American Revolutionary War on the American side, George Germain, the Secretary of State for the Colonies, wrote to General Sir Henry Clinton that capturing the Southern Colonies was "considered by the King as an object of great importance in the scale of the war". Germain's instructions to Clinton, framed as recommendations, were that he should abandon Philadelphia and then embark upon operations to recover Georgia and the Carolinas; whilst making diversionary attacks against Virginia and Maryland.

=== British preparations ===
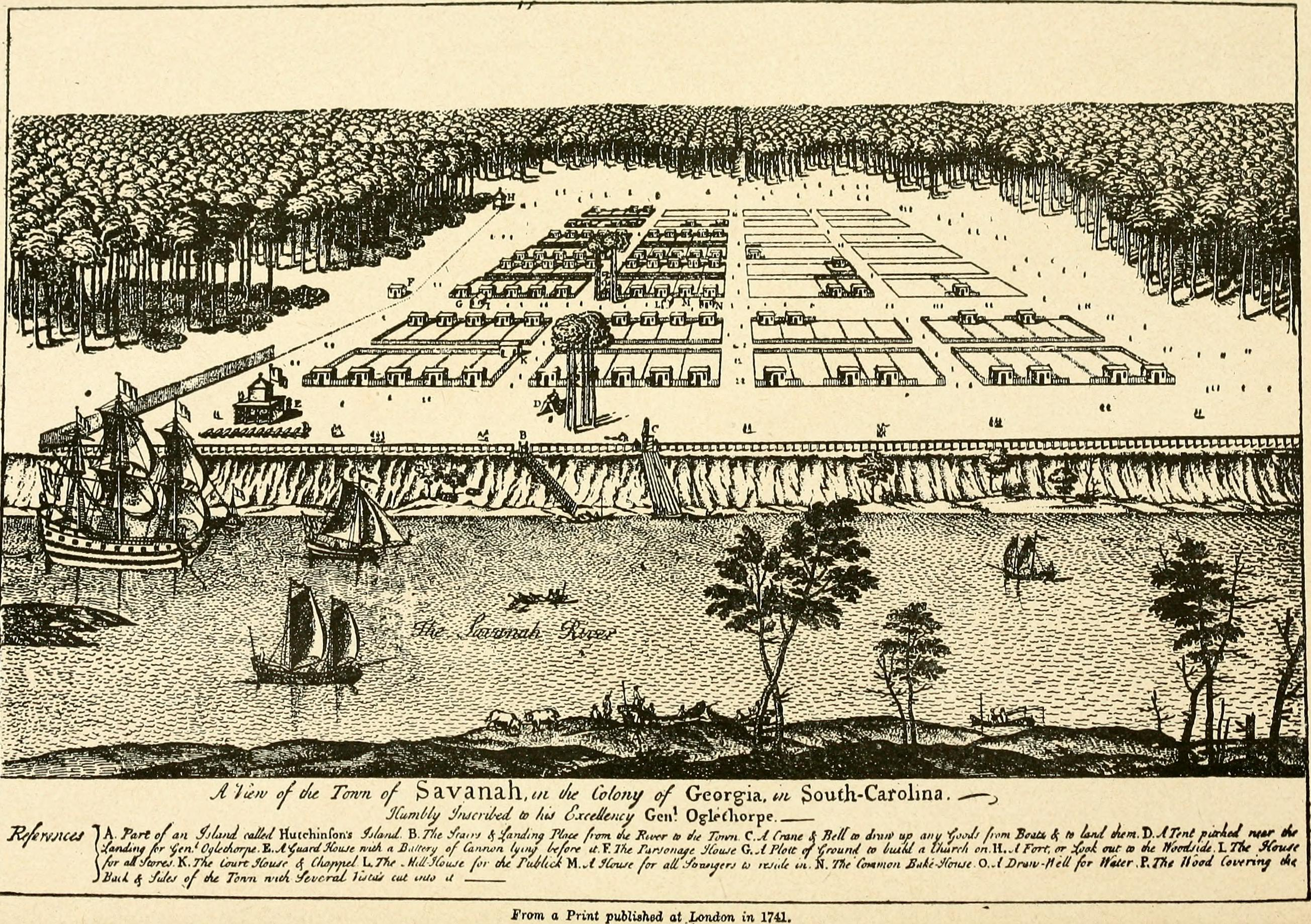
Savannah, Georgia in 1741

From June to July 1778, Clinton moved his troops from Philadelphia back to New York. In November, after dealing with the threat of a French fleet off New York and Newport, Rhode Island, Clinton turned his attention to the South. He organized a force of about 3,000 men in New York and sent orders to Saint Augustine, Florida, where Brigadier-General Augustine Prevost was to organize all available men and Indian agent John Stuart was to rally the local Muscogee and Cherokee warriors to assist in operations against Georgia. Clinton's basic plan, first proposed by Thomas Brown in 1776, began with the capture of the capital of Georgia, Savannah.

Clinton gave command of the detachment from New York to Lieutenant-colonel Archibald Campbell. The force consisted of the 1st and 2nd battalions of the 71st Regiment of Foot, Hessian troops of von Wöllwarth's Grenadier Regiment and von Wissenbach's Garrison Regiment, and several Loyalist units which included a battalion of New York Volunteers, two battalions of DeLancey's Brigade, and one battalion from the New Jersey Volunteers. Campbell sailed from New York on November 26 and arrived off Tybee Island, near the mouth of the Savannah River, on December 23.

=== American defenses ===
Georgia was defended by two separate forces. Local Continental Army troops were under the command of Major-General Robert Howe, who was responsible for the defense of the entire South, and the state's militiamen were under the overall command of Governor John Houstoun. Howe and Georgia officials had previously squabbled over control of military expeditions against East Florida, which had resulted in failure. These failures led the Continental Congress to decide in September 1778 to replace Howe with Major-General Benjamin Lincoln, who had been involved in militia participation in the Saratoga campaign. Lincoln had not yet arrived when word reached Howe that Clinton was sending troops to Georgia.

In November 1778, British incursions into Georgia became more and more threatening to the state's population centers. Despite the urgency of the situation, Houstoun refused to allow Howe to direct the movements of the Georgia Militia. On November 18, Howe began marching south from Charleston, South Carolina with 550 Continental Army troops, arriving in Savannah late that month. He learned that Campbell had sailed from New York on December 6. On December 23, sails were spotted off Tybee Island. On the next day, Houstoun assigned 100 militiamen to Howe.

A council of war decided to attempt a vigorous defense of Savannah although it was thought that they were likely to be significantly outnumbered by the British and hoped to last until Lincoln's troops arrived. The large number of potential landing points forced Howe to hold most of his army in reserve until the British had actually landed.

== Battle ==
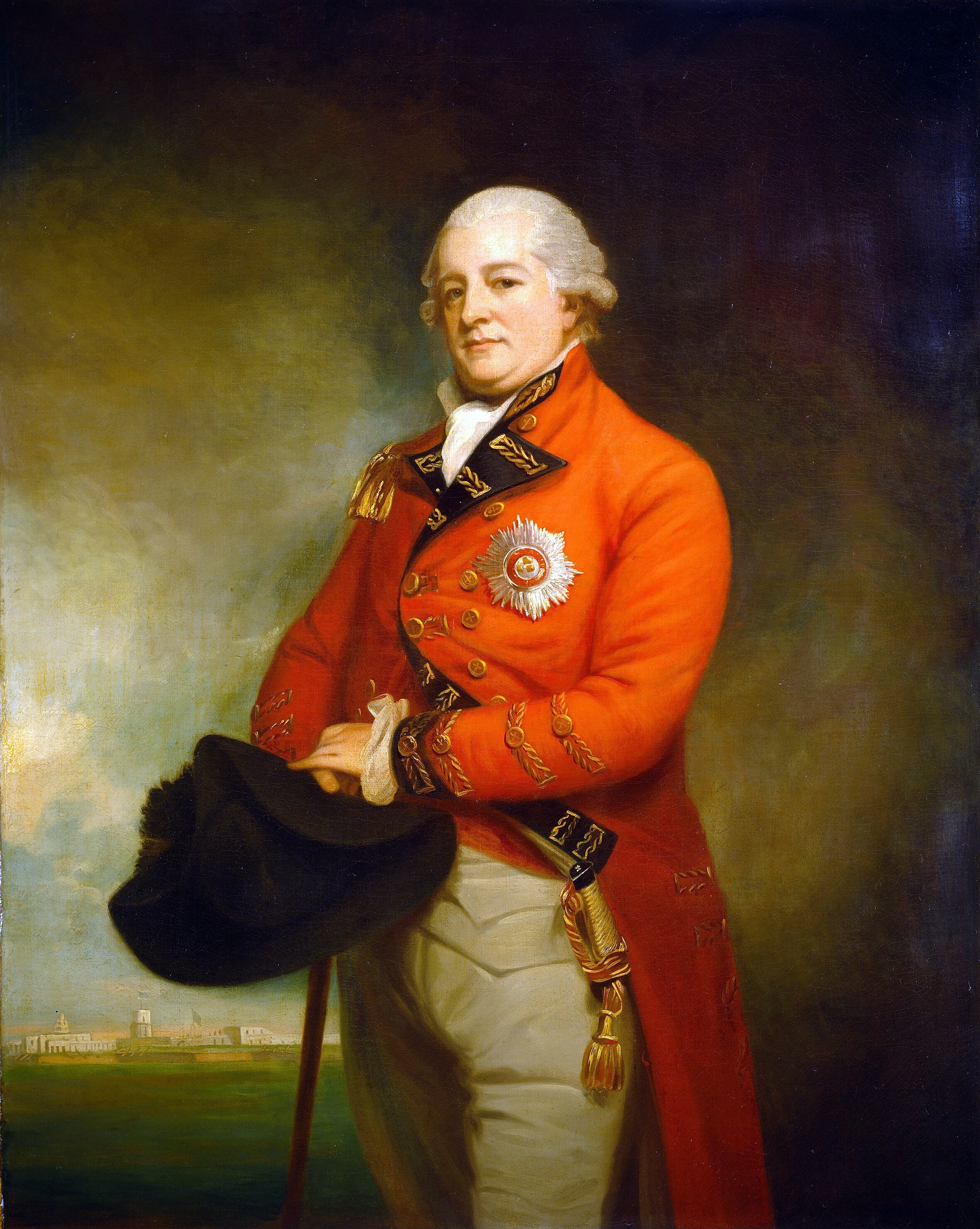
Archibald Campbell, the British commander at the battle

The place Campbell selected for landing was Girardeau's Plantation, located about 2 miles (3.2 km) below the city. When word reached Howe that the landing had started on December 29, he sent a Continental Army company to occupy the bluffs above the landing site. Campbell realized that the bluffs would need to be controlled before the majority of his forces could land, and dispatched two companies of the 71st Regiment to take control of them. American troops opened fire at about 100 yards (91 m). The British, rather than returning fire, advanced rapidly with bayonets fixed, denying the Americans a second shot, who retreated after they had killed four and wounded five at no cost to themselves. By noon, Campbell had landed his army and began to proceed cautiously toward the city.

Howe held a council that morning and ground was chosen at which to make a stand. About one-half-mile (0.7 km) south of the city he established a line of defense in the shape of an open V, with the ends anchored by swampy woods. On the left, Howe placed Georgia regulars and militia under Samuel Elbert, while on the right, he put South Carolina regulars and militia under Isaac Huger and William Thomson. The line was supported by four pieces of field artillery, and light infantry companies guarded the flanks. Most of Howe's troops, including his Continental Army soldiers, had seen little or no action in the war.

When Campbell's advance companies spotted Howe's line around 2:00 pm, the main body stopped short of the field and Campbell went to see what he was up against. He viewed Howe's defenses as essentially sound, but a local slave told him that there was a path through the swamp on Howe's right. Campbell ordered Sir James Baird to take 350 light infantrymen and 250 New York Volunteers and follow the slave through the swamp, while he arrayed his troops just out of view in a way that would give the impression he would attempt a flanking maneuver on Howe's left. One of his officers climbed a tree to observe Baird's progress. True to the slave's word, the trail came out near the Continental Army barracks, which had been left unguarded since the Americans were unaware they had been flanked. When they reached position, the man in the tree signaled by waving his hat, and Campbell ordered the British to charge.

The first sounds of battle Howe heard were musket fire from the barracks, but these were rapidly followed by cannon fire and the appearance of charging British and Hessian troops on his front. He ordered an immediate retreat, but it rapidly turned into a rout. His untried troops hardly bothered to return fire, some throwing down their weapons before attempting to run away through the swampy terrain. Campbell reported, "It was scarcely possible to come up with them, their retreat was rapid beyond Conception." British light infantry in the Continental rear cut off the road to Augusta, the only significant escape route, which forced a mad scramble of retreating troops into the city itself. Americans who did not immediately surrender were sometimes bayoneted. American soldiers on the right attempted to find a safe crossing of Musgrove Creek, but one did not exist, and many of them were taken prisoner. Huger managed to form a rear-guard to cover the escape of a number of Continental Army soldiers. Some of Howe's men managed to escape to the north before the British closed off the city, but others were forced to attempt swimming across Yamacraw Creek; an unknown number drowned in the attempt.

== Aftermath ==
Campbell gained control of the city at the cost to his forces of seven killed and seventeen wounded; including the four men killed and five wounded during preliminary skirmishing. Campbell took 453 prisoners, and there were at least 83 dead and 11 wounded from Howe's forces. The number of men who drowned during the retreat has been estimated at about 30. When Howe's retreat ended at Purrysburg, South Carolina he had 342 men left, less than half his original army. Howe would receive much of the blame for the disaster, with William Moultrie arguing that he should have either disputed the landing site in force or retreated without battle to keep his army intact. He was exonerated in a court martial that inquired into the event, but the tribunal pointed out that Howe should have made a stand at the bluffs or more directly opposed the landing.

Prevost arrived from East Florida in mid-January and soon sent Campbell with 1,000 men to take Augusta. Campbell occupied the frontier town against minimal opposition, but by then General Lincoln had begun to rally support in South Carolina to oppose the British. Campbell abandoned Augusta on February 14, the same day a Loyalist force en route to meet him was defeated in the Battle of Kettle Creek. Although American forces were defeated by the British at the Battle of Brier Creek on March 3, the Georgia backcountry remained in their hands.

Campbell wrote that he would be "the first British officer to [rend] a star and stripe from the flag of Congress." Savannah was used as a base to conduct coastal raids which targeted areas from Charleston, South Carolina to the Florida coast. In the fall of 1779, a combined French and American siege to recapture Savannah failed and suffered significant casualties. Control of Georgia was formally returned to its royal governor, James Wright, in July 1779, but the backcountry would not come under British control until after the 1780 Siege of Charleston. American forces recaptured Augusta in 1781, but Savannah remained in British hands until 11 July 1782.
