= John Harris Cruger =

- Born: December 25, 1737; Jamaica
- Died: June 3, 1807 (aged 69); Beverley, Yorkshire, England
- Burial place: St. James Chapel, London
- Relatives: Oliver De Lancey (father-in-law); John Cruger (grandfather); Henry Cruger (brother)
- Military career
- Allegiance: United Kingdom
- Branch: British Army
- Service years: 1776–1782
- Rank: Lieutenant Colonel
- Commands: 1 Battalion from De Lancey's Brigade (1776–1780),
- Conflicts: American Revolutionary War; Siege of Savannah (POW); Siege of Augusta; Siege of Charleston; Battle of Camden; Siege of Ninety Six; Battle of Eutaw Springs

John Harris Cruger (December 25, 1737 – June 3, 1807) was a Jamaican-born Loyalist British officer who led the 1st Battalion from De Lancey's Brigade during two sieges and aided General Charles Cornwallis until he was sent to South Carolina in 1780. He refused to surrender to General Nathaniel Greene and burned down the city of Ninety Six and fled into the wilderness. He saw combat for the last time at the Battle of Eutaw Springs. Following the battle, he returned to New York but left for London after he discovered that his belongings had been seized. He stayed in England until his death.

== Pre-war Life ==
Cruger was born in 1737, in Jamaica to Hendrick Cruger (1707–1780) and Elizabeth Harris (1712–1752). Hendrick was a wealthy New York merchant who owned trading centers in Bristol, and the West Indies and the son of John Cruger, a German immigrant and the 39th mayor of New York City. John Harris Cruger was educated at King's College (modern-day Columbia University) and married Anne De Lacy, the daughter of Oliver De Lancey, on November 25, 1762. In 1765, he was managing shipments of molasses, sugar, and rum between Jamaica and New York and later returned to New York to become governor of King's College in 1771. In 1773, he took his father's place in the Governor's Royal Council. In June 1776, Cruger fled from his home in Hanover Square when a group of rebels tried to seize him. Cruger hid in a Loyalist Quaker's barn until the British army recaptured the city in August 1776.

== American Revolutionary War ==
Though he had no previous experience, he was given command of the 1st battalion from De Lancey's Brigade and played a crucial role in both the sieges of Savannah with Lieutenant Colonel Archibald Campbell and Charleston. During the Si m, ege of Savannah, he was captured and at Belfast, Georgia, in June 1780, he was soon exchanged for John McIntosh. He then succeeded Nisbet Balfour around mid-August as commander of the Tory stronghold at Ninety-Six, and led the relief column from this place that relieved the siege of Augusta from August 14, to September 18, 1780. He then distinguished himself in commanding the defense of Ninety Six, May 22, to June 19, 1781, after refusing to surrender to General Nathaniel Greene's forces, he set Ninety-Six ablaze when defeat was eminent and fled into the woods. The operation for which he was justly praised for his vigilance and gallantry. Joining the main British army in the South, he was commended for his conduct and gallantry at Eutaw Springs, September 8, 1781. Speaking of the defenses of Charleston as organized the end of 1781.

== Post-War and Death ==
Following the end of his service in the summer of 1782, Cruger returned to New York only to realize that his property and personal possessions had looted and seized under the Confiscation Act of 1779. This forced Cruger to migrate to London where he settled in Beverley, Yorkshire with his wife and brother, Henry Cruger Jr. until his death in 1807. He was entombed in a vault beneath St. James Chapel in Hampstead, London.
