= War Hill (Georgia) =

Coordinates: 33.6920°N 82.8829°W

War Hill is a summit in the U.S. state of Georgia. The elevation is 518 feet (158 m).

War Hill was named for the fact the Battle of Kettle Creek (1779) was fought here.
