= Fort Tonyn =

Fort Tonyn, named for General Patrick Tonyn (East Florida's Royal Governor at the time of the American Revolution), was located in present-day Nassau County, Florida, near the hamlet of Mills's Ferry, about 25 miles up the St. Marys River. The fort was unremarkable in its day, seeing little action, and apparently was not even recognized as a fort by the British; the name appears to have been used by the Americans for this British outpost. It is remembered chiefly because it served as a way station in the only substantial campaign Florida saw during the Revolution. General Robert Howe camped near the fort with some 400 men on June 28, 1778, forcing the withdrawal of Lieutenant Thomas Brown and his loyalist East Florida Rangers, who were stationed there as the front line of defense for British East Florida. They burned the fort and retreated into Cabbage Swamp. These events occurred just prior to Colonel Elijah Clarke leading his Continental Army troops to defeat at the Battle of Alligator Creek Bridge on June 30, the only major engagement in an unsuccessful campaign to conquer British East Florida during the American Revolutionary War.

A fort is believed to have existed at the site as late as the War of 1812.
