= Isunigu =

Human settlement in South Carolina, United States of America

Coordinates: 34°40′N 82°51′W

Isunigu Seneca; Esseneca; Sinica
- Cherokee town
- Location in South Carolina
- Country: United States
- State: South Carolina
- County: Oconee

Isunigu (also called Seneca, Esseneca, and Sinica) was a Cherokee town on the Keowee River. It was on the west side of the Keowee River, near the mouth of Coneross Creek, in today's Oconee County, South Carolina. Present-day Clemson and Seneca, South Carolina later developed near here.

During the colonial period, Isunigu was classified by English traders and colonists as one of the Cherokee "Lower Towns", a geographical grouping that included Piedmont towns along the Keowee River in southwestern South Carolina and towns along the Tugaloo River in northeastern Georgia. The principal town of this grouping was considered to be Keowee, on the river of the same name. In the late 18th and early 19th centuries, the Cherokee ceded their land of the Lower Towns to South Carolina.

Andrew Pickens developed his "Hopewell" plantation on the east side of the Keowee River. Following the American Revolution and conflict between the Cherokee and European Americans, this was where the 1785 Treaty of Hopewell was signed by both parties.

The site of Isunigu, a settlement that likely had more than a thousand years of previous indigenous habitation, as did other towns in the area, was flooded by the creation in the 20th century of Lake Hartwell. It was formed as the reservoir behind Hartwell Dam on the Keowee River. The meaning of the name Isunigu is lost, along with the artifacts and other materials from prehistoric and historic years now submerged under Lake Hartwell.
