= Siege of Ninety Six =

Siege (1781) in the American Revolutionary War

Siege of Ninety-Six
- Part of the American Revolutionary War
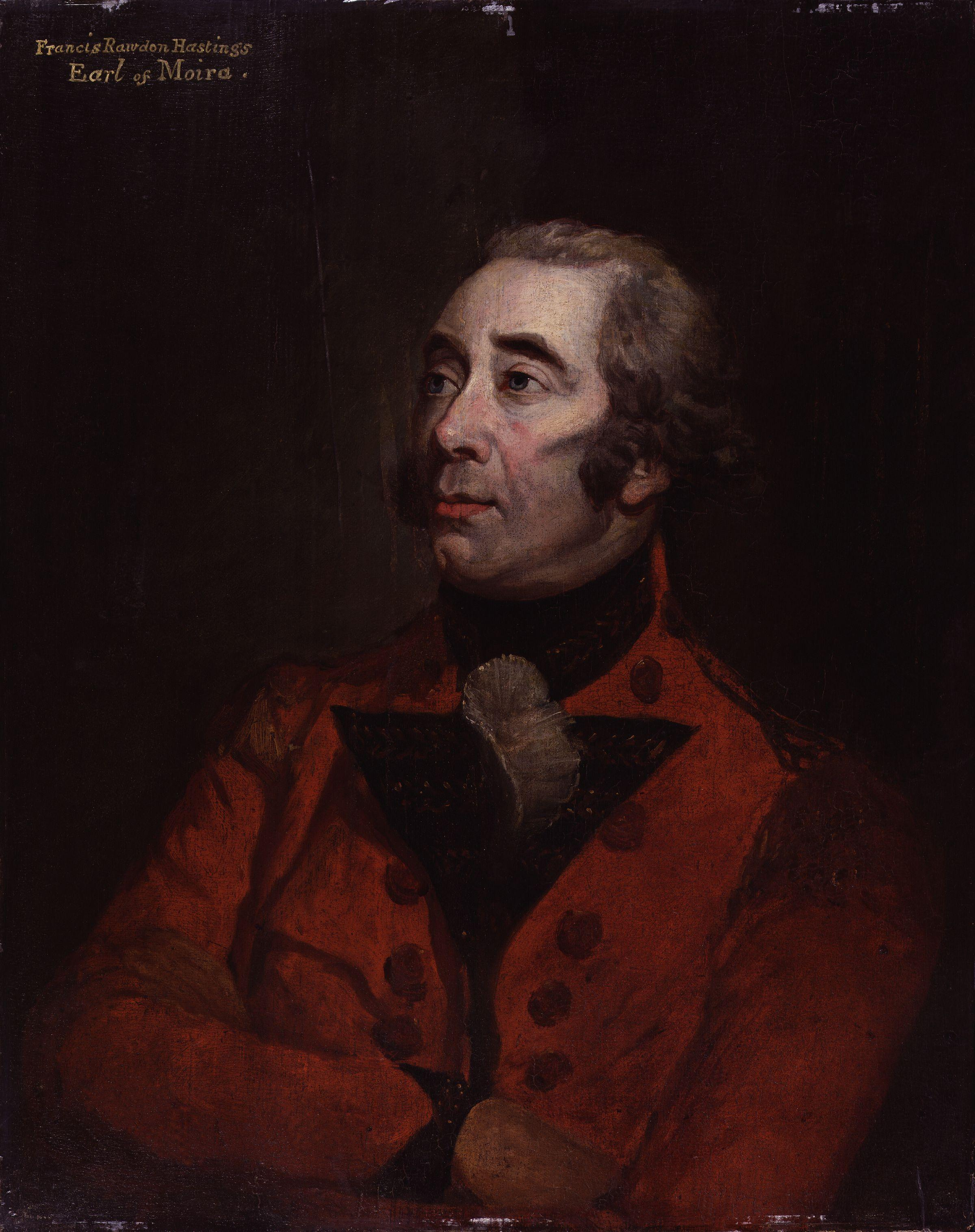
- Lord Rawdon – lifted the Siege so the Loyalists could escape
Date	May 22 – June 19, 1781 (4 weeks)
Location	Ninety Six, South Carolina 34°8′49″N 82°1′28″W
Result	British victory

Belligerents
United States	Great Britain

Commanders and leaders
(United States) Nathanael Greene (United States) Andrew Pickens (United States) Henry Lee (United States) Tadeusz Kosciuszko	(Loyalist (American Revolution)) John Cruger

Strength
1,000–1,500	550

Casualties and losses
57 killed 70 wounded 20 missing	27 killed 58 wounded

The siege of Ninety Six was a siege in western South Carolina late in the American Revolutionary War. From May 22 to June 18, 1781, Continental Army Major General Nathanael Greene led 1,000 troops in a siege against the 550 Loyalists in the fortified village of Ninety Six, South Carolina. The 28-day siege centered on an earthen fortification known as Star Fort. Despite having more troops, Greene was unsuccessful in taking the town, and was forced to lift the siege when Lord Rawdon approached from Charleston with British troops.

The area is now protected as Ninety Six National Historic Site and was designated a National Historic Landmark. Many of the surviving Loyalists were later relocated by the Crown and granted land in Nova Scotia, where they named their township Rawdon to commemorate their rescuer.

== Background ==
The British Army's "southern strategy" for winning the American Revolutionary War, which had been successful in taking Charleston and winning submission of much of South Carolina and Georgia, hit a stumbling block in March 1781, after General Lord Cornwallis defeated Continental Army General Nathanael Greene at the Battle of Guilford Courthouse in Greensboro, North Carolina. Cornwallis had suffered significant casualties and subsequently moved his army to Wilmington, North Carolina. Greene, whose army was still largely intact after that battle, took advantage of Cornwallis' move to march into South Carolina and begin operations to eliminate the British from that state.

With the assistance of militia commanders Thomas Sumter, Francis Marion, and Andrew Pickens, the Patriot forces took a number of British outposts in the backcountry of South Carolina; others were abandoned to them. By mid-May, the only places in the state with significant British garrisons were Ninety Six, in the northwestern part of the state, and the port of Charleston, nearly 200 miles southeast on the Atlantic coast.

== Order of Battle ==
The order of battle for the forces involved in the battle was:

=== Continentals ===
- Commanding Officer, Major General Nathanael Greene
- Lee's Legion (150 mounted & foot)
- 1 Company from the Delaware Regiment
- 4 6-pounder cannons
- South Carolina Militia commanded by Brigadier General Andrew Pickens
- North Carolina Militia
- Maryland Brigade, commanded by Colonel Otho Holland Williams
  - 1st Maryland Regiment
  - 2nd Maryland Regiment
- Virginia Brigade, commanded by Brigadier General Isaac Huger
  - 1st Virginia Regiment - Lt. Col. Richard Campbell
  - 2nd Virginia Regiment - Lt. Col. Samuel Hawes (resigned, May 30), Maj. Smith Snead

=== British ===
- Commanding Officer, Lieutenant Colonel John Harris Cruger
- 1st Battalion of De Lancey's Brigade
- 2nd Battalion of New Jersey Volunteers
- South Carolina Loyalist Militia from the Ninety Six District
- 3 3-pounder cannons, but no artillerists

== British Defenses ==
The British outpost at Ninety Six was garrisoned by 550 experienced Loyalists, such as De Lancey's Brigade, formed into Provincial regiments (regular army troops who had been recruited from Loyalists in New York, New Jersey, and South Carolina) under the command of Lieutenant Colonel John Cruger. Occupied by the British since 1780, the defenses consisted of a palisade surrounded by a deep ditch and abatis (felled trees with sharpened branches facing out). A large redoubt called the Star Fort provided a place for defenders to enfilade attackers on two of the stockade walls, and a smaller redoubt provided similar cover for the remaining walls and the water supply. Cruger had three small (three pound) field pieces.

== Siege ==
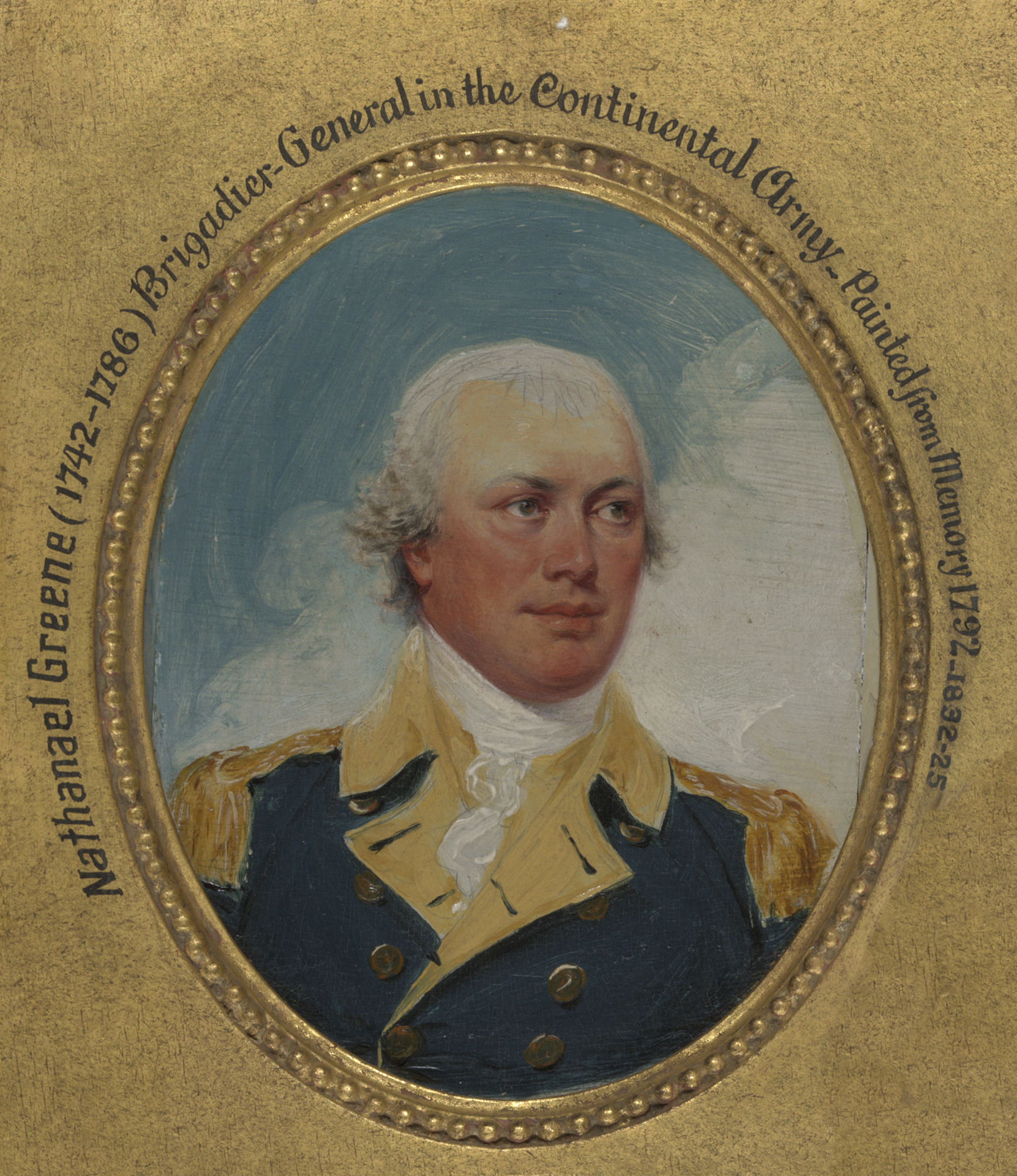
Nathanael Greene

Greene and about 1,000 men arrived outside Ninety Six on May 22, the same day that Andrew Pickens and Henry "Light-horse Harry" Lee began to besiege nearby Augusta, Georgia. They immediately began siege operations, targeting the Star Fort, under their chief engineer, Col. Thaddeus Kosciuszko of Poland. Cruger did what he could to interfere with the siege works, frequently sending out parties at night to harass the workers. In one notable incident, his forces drove the workers away and captured some of their digging tools.

By June 3 Greene's men had dug a trench within 30 yards (27 m) of the Star Fort. They used a tactic similar to one used by Gen. Marion to capture Fort Watson, whereby they constructed a wooden Maham Tower, about 30 feet (9.1 m) tall, with a protected platform at the top. Under this elevated cover, American sharpshooters would have a clear firing line into the fort. At first, the crack snipers in the tower were able to pick off a number of Cruger's artillerymen. Cruger quickly countered by using sandbags to raise the height of his parapet, giving enough cover so his own marksmen could fire on the tower through slats between the bags. He also tried to set the tower on fire with heated shot, but was unable to get the balls hot enough. The attackers fired flaming arrows into the fort (a tactic that had worked when Patriots captured Fort Motte), in order to set anything flammable within the fort on fire. Cruger had work crews remove the roofs from the buildings in the fort to prevent them from burning.

On June 7 Lord Rawdon left Charleston with 2,000 British forces to relieve the siege. The next day, Pickens and Lee arrived, having successfully captured Augusta on June 6. Greene did not learn of Rawdon's move until June 11. With the situation becoming critical, Greene decided to try an assault on the fort. (Cruger learned of Rawdon's approach the next day when the messenger, posing as a Patriot, got close enough to the fort to race the remaining distance on his horse.)

== Assault ==
Greene planned to have one party capture the smaller redoubt, while a larger attack force went after the Star Fort, where some men would pull down the sandbags to expose the defenders to fire from the tower. When the attack began on June 18, all went to plan at first—the smaller redoubt was taken, and men successfully penetrated the abatis and pulled down the sandbags. At this point, Cruger launched a counterstrike with a pair of sorties to strike at the flanks of the attacking party. In a fierce battle dominated by bayonets and the use of muskets as clubs, the leaders of the attack were killed and their men forced to retreat back to their trenches. With the failure of the attack, and Rawdon only 30 miles (48 km) away, Greene called off the assault and ordered a retreat.

== Aftermath ==
Greene's losses amounted to 150 men, while Cruger's casualties were under 100. Greene retreated toward Charlotte, North Carolina, allowing Rawdon to join forces with Cruger. Rawdon sent a sizable force after Greene, but heat and the toll of the long forced marches slowed them. The force was recalled to Ninety Six, which Rawdon then abandoned.

General Greene blamed the failure of the operations against Ninety Six in part on Sumter and Marion, who failed to act in support of his operations in a timely manner. Later, other officers blamed Greene and Lee for failing to cut off the defenders' water supply at the Spring Branch.

Writing in his memoirs, Lee singled out Col. Kosciuszko for much of the defeat. He believed the engineer began the first parallel too close to the Star Fort, as well as underestimating the lengthy amount of time his undermanned and ill-equipped sappers needed to excavate the rock-hard soil enough to make a trench to support the siege. Though these issues contributed to the failure of the operation as a whole, Greene commended Kosciuszko's efforts in carrying out his orders, noting that given more time, his chief engineer's plan might well have succeeded.

When Greene learned of Rawdon's retreat from Ninety Six, he tried to pull all of the elements of the Patriot military forces together to attack Rawdon before he reached Charleston. He failed because of Sumter's and Marion's apparently tardy movements. Greene rested his men for most of July and August in the High Hills of the Santee before engaging the British again outside Charleston at Eutaw Springs on September 8, 1781, in the last major battle in the South.

== Legacy ==
Ninety Six National Historic Site was declared a National Historic Landmark in 1973.

== General bibliography ==
- Morrill, Dan (1993). Southern campaigns of the American Revolution. Nautical & Aviation Publishing. ISBN 1-877853-21-6.
- Pancake, John (1985). This Destructive War. University of Alabama Press. ISBN 0-8173-0191-7.
- Reynolds, William R. Jr. (2012). Andrew Pickens: South Carolina Patriot in the Revolutionary War. Jefferson, NC: McFarland & Company. ISBN 978-0-7864-6694-8.
