= John Dooly =

American Revolutionary War hero

- Born: 1740; Georgia, Great Britain
- Died: 1780 (aged 39–40)
- Children: 2 sons and 1 daughter
- Military career
- Allegiance: United States
- Service years: 1779
- Conflicts: American Revolutionary War Battle of Kettle Creek

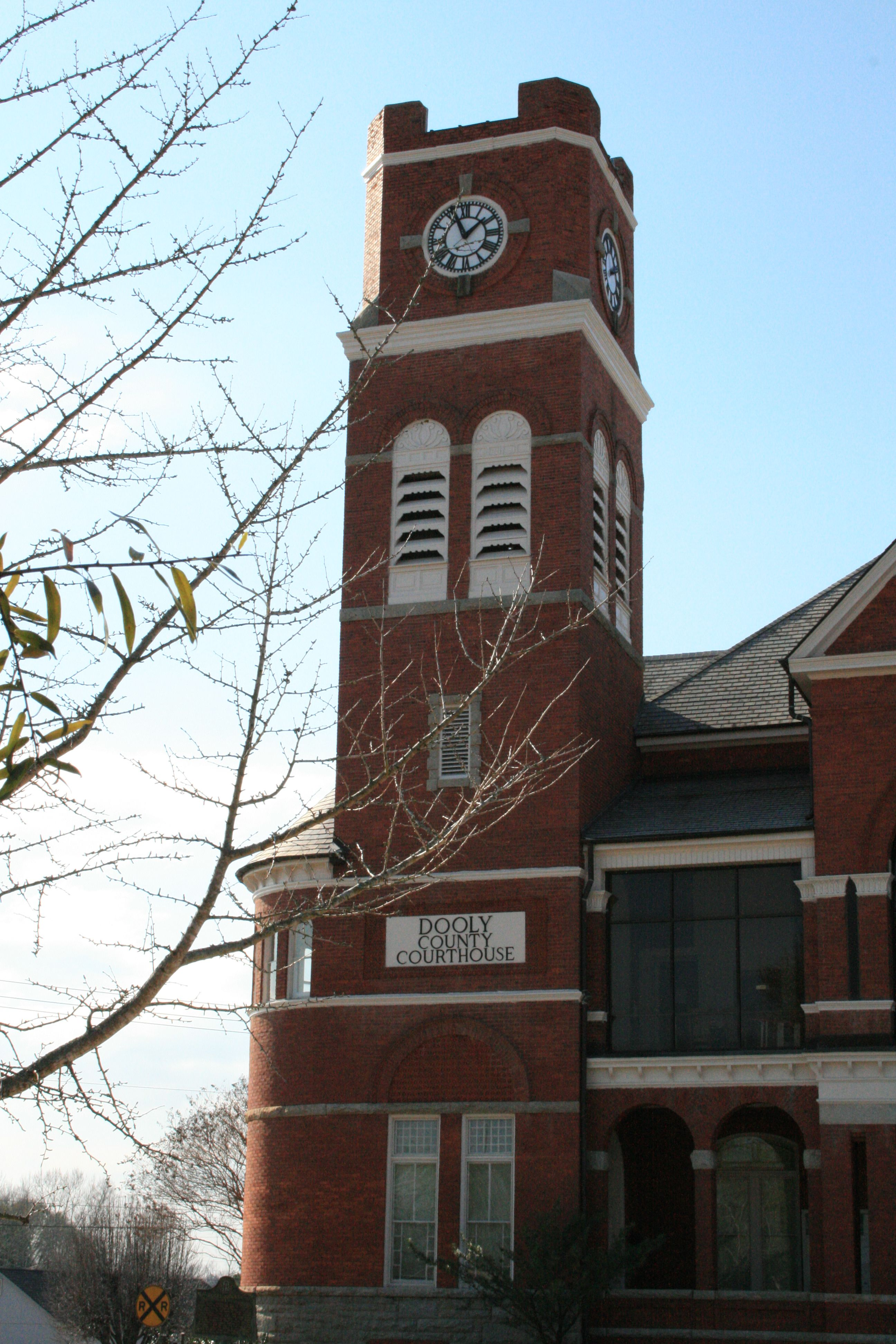
The Dooly County Courthouse in Vienna, Georgia. The county was named so in recognition of John Dooly's efforts

Colonel John Dooly (1740 – 1780) was an American Revolutionary War hero. He commanded a regiment at the Battle of Kettle Creek in 1779 and was killed at his home by Tories in 1780. He was born in Wilkes County, Georgia, of Irish parentage.

== Legacy ==
John Dooly is the namesake of Dooly County, Georgia.
