= Battle of Kettle Creek =

1779 American Revolutionary War battle

- Part of the American Revolutionary War
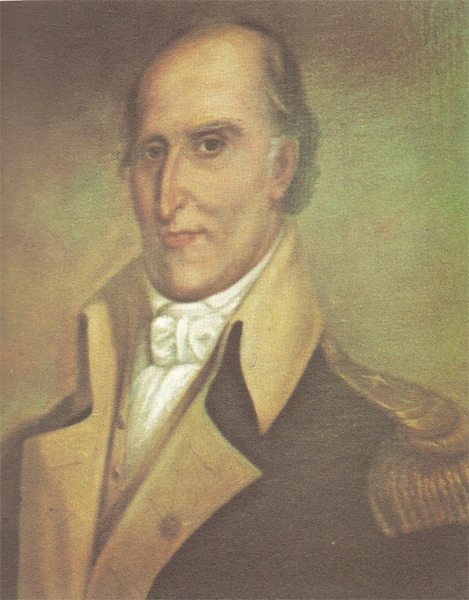
- Andrew Pickens, portrait by Thomas Sully
Date	February 14, 1779
Location	Near present-day Washington, Georgia 33.6908°N 82.8860°W
Result	United States victory

Belligerents
Great Britain	United States

Commanders and leaders
John Boyd †; William Spurgen	Andrew Pickens; John Dooly; Elijah Clarke; Col. James Little

Strength
600–700 militia	340–420 militia

Casualties and losses
40–70 killed 75 wounded or captured 5 POW hanged	7–9 killed 14–23 wounded or missing

The Battle of Kettle Creek was the first major victory for Patriots in the back country of Georgia during the American Revolutionary War that took place on February 14, 1779. It was fought in Wilkes County about eleven miles (18 km) from present-day Washington, Georgia. A militia force of Patriots defeated and scattered a Loyalist militia force that was on its way to British-controlled Augusta. Several Loyalist prisoners were subsequently hanged.

The victory illustrated the difficulty British forces faced in holding the interior of the state, or even protecting sizable numbers of Loyalist recruits outside their immediate area. The British, who had already decided to abandon Augusta, recovered some prestige a few weeks later, surprising a Patriot force in the Battle of Brier Creek. Georgia's back country would not come fully under British control until after the 1780 Siege of Charleston broke Patriot forces in the South.

== Background ==
The British began their Southern Strategy by sending expeditions from New York City and Saint Augustine, East Florida to capture the port of Savannah, Georgia in December 1778. The New York expedition, under the command of Lieutenant Colonel Archibald Campbell, arrived first and landed at Tybee Island on December 3, 1778, capturing Savannah on December 29, 1778.

=== British occupation of Augusta ===
When British Brigadier General Augustine Prevost arrived from Saint Augustine in mid-January, he assumed command of the garrison there and sent a force under Campbell to take control of Augusta and raise Loyalist forces.

Leaving Savannah on January 24, Campbell and more than 1,000 men arrived near Augusta a week later, with only minimal harassment from Georgia Patriot militia on the way. Augusta had been defended by South Carolina General Andrew Williamson leading about 1,000 militia from Georgia and South Carolina, but he withdrew most of his men when Campbell approached. His rear guard briefly skirmished with Campbell's men before it withdrew across the Savannah River into South Carolina.

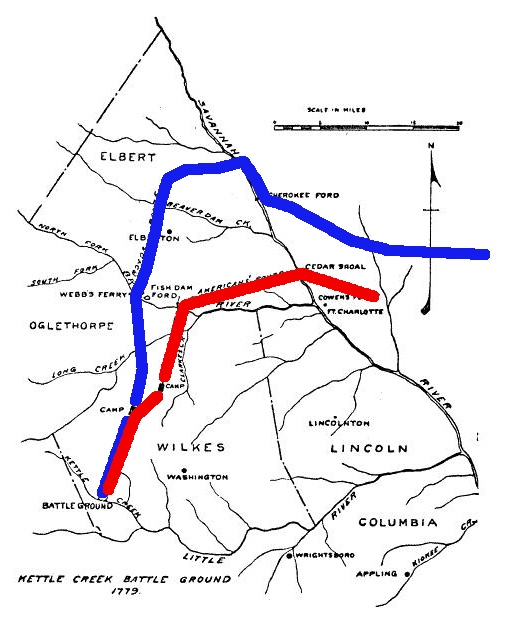
A 1926 map reconstructing the arrival routes of the forces at the battlefield. The British route is highlighted in blue, the Patriot route in red.

Campbell started recruiting Loyalists. By February 10, 1779, about 1,100 men signed up, but relatively few actually formed militia companies, forming only 20 companies of the British Army. Campbell then began requiring oaths of loyalty, on pain of forfeiture of property; many took the oath insincerely and quickly let Williamson know their true feelings. Early in his march, Campbell dispatched Major John Hamilton to recruit Loyalists in Wilkes County and Lt. Colonel John Boyd on an expedition to raise Loyalists in the backcountry of North and South Carolina. Boyd met with success and recruited several hundred men. As he traveled south back toward Augusta, more Loyalists joined his company until it numbered over 600 men in central South Carolina. As this column moved on, the men plundered and pillaged along the way, predictably drawing angered Patriots to take up arms.

=== American response ===
The Continental Army commander in the South, Major General Benjamin Lincoln, based in Charleston, South Carolina, had been unable to respond adequately to the capture of Savannah. With only limited resources (he was short of both men and funds), he was able to raise about 1,400 South Carolina militia, but did not have authorization to order them outside the state. On January 30, he was further reinforced at Charleston by the arrival of 1,100 North Carolina militia under General John Ashe. Then he immediately dispatched them to join Williamson on the South Carolina side of the Savannah River near Augusta.

The Georgia banks of the Savannah in the Augusta area were controlled by a Loyalist force led by Colonel Daniel McGirth, while the South Carolina banks were controlled by a Georgia Patriot militia led by Colonel John Dooly. Colonel John Dooly was a close associate and partner with Elijah Clarke. When about 250 South Carolina militia under Colonel Andrew Pickens arrived, Pickens and Dooly joined forces to conduct offensive operations into Georgia, with Pickens taking overall command. They were at some point joined by a few companies of North Carolina light horse militia.

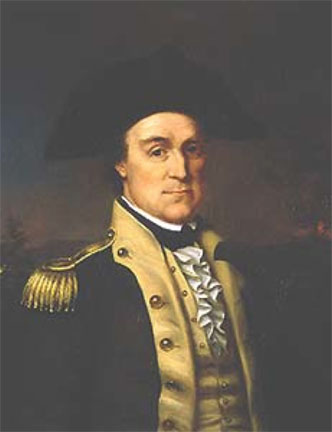
Lieutenant Colonel Elijah Clarke, portrait by Rembrandt Peale

On February 10, Pickens and Dooly crossed the Savannah River to attack a British Army camp southeast of Augusta. Finding the camp unoccupied, they learned that the company was out on an extended patrol. Suspecting they would head for a stockaded frontier post called Carr's Fort, Pickens sent men directly there while the main body chased after the British. The British made it into the fort, but were forced to abandon their horses and baggage outside its walls. Pickens then besieged the fort until he learned that Boyd was passing through the Ninety Six district of South Carolina with seven to eight hundred Loyalists, headed for Georgia. He reluctantly raised the siege and moved to intercept Boyd.

Pickens established a strong presence near the mouth of the Broad River, where he expected Boyd might try to cross. However, Boyd, his force grown by then to 800 men, chose to go to the north. He first tried Cherokee Ford, the southernmost fording of the Savannah River, where he was met with some resistance known as the Engagement at McGowen's Blockhouse. The encounter consisted of a detachment of eight Patriots commanded by Capt. Robert Anderson with two small swivel guns in an entrenched position, who thwarted Boyd's approach to Cherokee Ford. Boyd moved north upstream about 5 miles (8.0 km) and crossed the Savannah River there, skirmishing with a small Patriot force that had shadowed his movements on the Georgia side. Boyd reported losing 100 men, killed, wounded, or deserted, in the encounter.

By the time Pickens learned that Boyd had crossed the river, he had himself crossed into South Carolina in an attempt to intercept Boyd. He immediately recrossed into Georgia upon learning of Boyd's whereabouts. On February 14, Pickens caught up with Boyd when he paused to rest his troops near Kettle Creek, only a few miles from Colonel McGirth's Loyalist camp.

== Battle ==
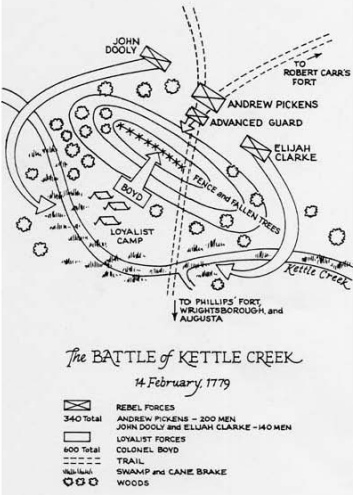
A 1926 map reconstructing the tactical movements in the battle. No contemporary maps of the battlefield have been found.

Boyd was apparently unaware that he was being followed so closely, and his camp, even though guards were posted, was not particularly alert. Pickens advanced, leading the center, with his right flank under Colonel Dooly and his left under Georgia Lieutenant Colonel Elijah Clarke. Gunfire between Patriot scouts and the camp guards alerted Boyd to the situation. Boyd formed a defensive line near the camp's rear and advanced with a force of 100 men to oppose Pickens at a crude breastwork made of fencing and fallen trees. Pickens, whose advance gave him the advantage of high ground, was able to flank this position, even though his own wings were slowed by the swampy conditions near the creek. In heavy fighting, Boyd went down with a mortal wound, and the small company retreated to the main Loyalist line.

The Patriot flanks then began to emerge from the swamps. The Loyalists, led by Boyd's second in command, Major William Spurgen, engaged the Patriots in battle for 90 minutes. Some of the Loyalists crossed the creek, abandoning horses and equipment. Clarke alertly noticed some high ground across the Kettle Creek that they seemed to be heading for and led some of his men there, having his horse shot from under him in the process. The Loyalist line was eventually broken, and its men were killed, captured, or dispersed.

== Aftermath ==
=== Treatment of prisoners ===
Pickens took 75 prisoners, including most of the wounded, and between 40 and 70 Loyalists were killed. He suffered 7 to 9 killed and 14–23 wounded or missing in the battle. Many of Boyd's men (including some who had escaped the battlefield and others that Pickens paroled) returned home. A significant number were either captured or surrendered themselves to Patriot authorities in the days following the battle, and the fate of some of his men is unknown. Lieutenant Colonel Campbell reported that 270 of Boyd's recruits eventually joined him, and he organized them into the Royal North Carolina Regiment. When Pickens approached the mortally wounded Boyd after the battle, the Loyalist leader, who had lived in South Carolina before the war and was known to Pickens, asked the Patriot leader to deliver a brooch to his wife and inform her of his fate. This Pickens eventually did.

Of the Loyalist prisoners, only about 20 survived their wounds. Pickens first took them to Augusta, and then Ninety Six, where they were held along with a large number of other Loyalists. Seeking to make an example of them, South Carolina authorities put a number of these Loyalists on trial for treason. About 50 of them were convicted, and five men, including some of the men captured at Kettle Creek, were hanged. British commanders were outraged over the American treatment of their prisoners of war, even before the trial was held. General Prevost threatened retaliation against Patriot prisoners he was holding, but did not act out of fear that other American-held British prisoners might be mistreated. His invasion of coastal South Carolina in April 1779, a counter-thrust against movements by General Lincoln to recover Georgia, prompted South Carolina officials to vacate most of the convictions.

=== British reaction ===
In a council held in Augusta on February 12, Campbell decided to abandon Augusta and began the withdrawal to Savannah on February 14 at 2AM, the morning of the battle. Contrary to opinions expressed by some historians, Campbell did not leave because of the battle's outcome. He did not learn of the battle until after he had already left Augusta; his departure was prompted by the arrival of 1,200 of Patriot General John Ashe's forces in General Andrew Williamson's camp across the Savannah River, a shortage of provisions, and uncertainty over whether Boyd would be successful in his mission. The success of Kettle Creek was undone to some extent by the subsequent British victory at the March 3 Battle of Brier Creek, which took place during Campbell's retreat in present-day Screven County.

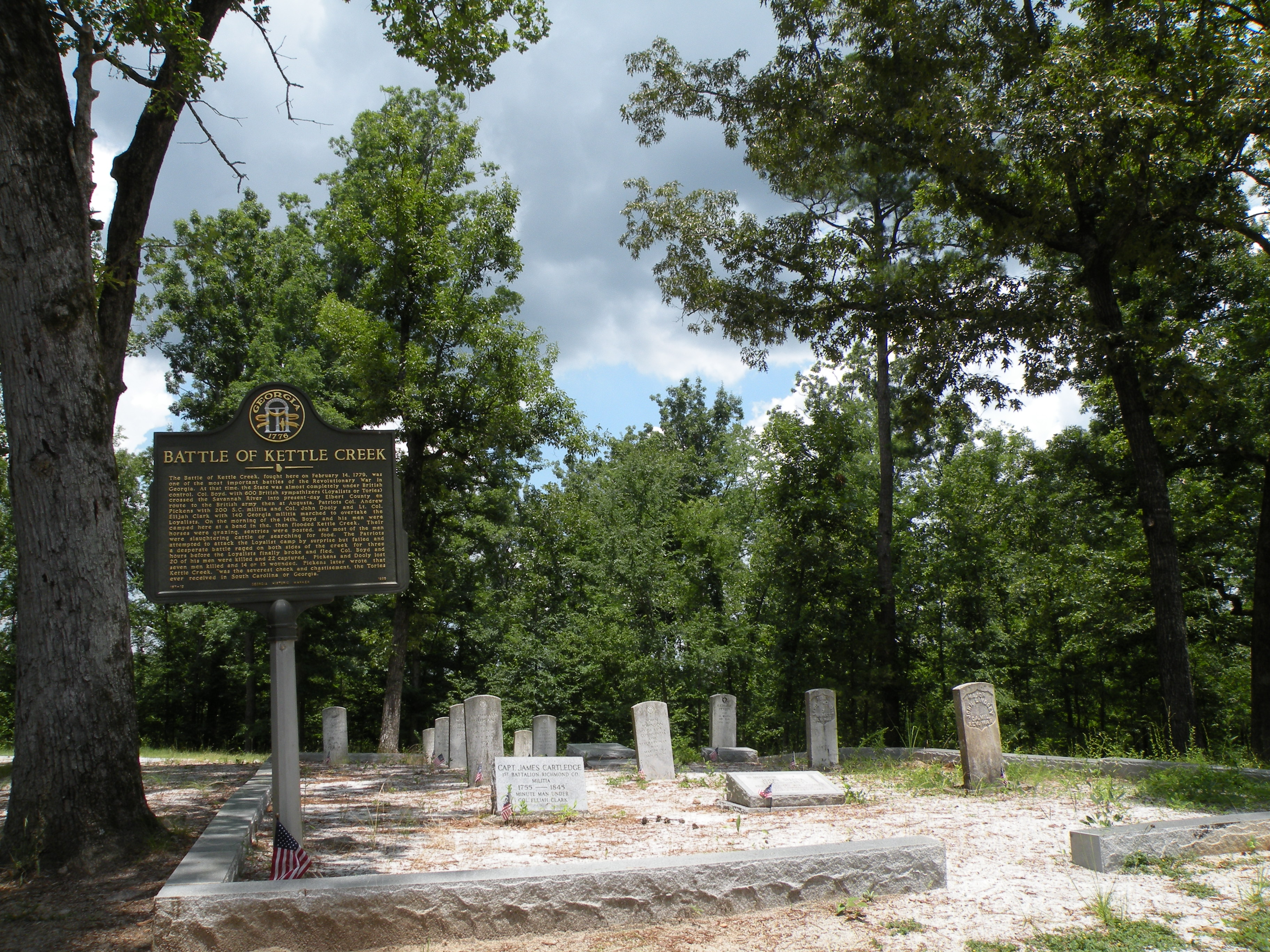
The Kettle Creek battlefield, 2010

Augusta was later recaptured by the British in June 1780 after Patriot forces collapsed in the aftermath of the Siege of Charleston. It was retaken by siege by Patriot forces on June 5, 1781.

== Legacy ==
The Kettle Creek Battlefield has been listed on the National Register of Historic Places. Most of the battlefield is owned by Wilkes County, and in 2008, an archeological survey conducted by Daniel Elliot of the Lamar Institute identified the original location of the place where the fight occurred. It is located off Tyrone Road in Wilkes County. In 2013, 60 acres of the battlefield area was purchased by the Kettle Creek Battlefield Association using donations from individuals and other heritage organization. Then, in 2018, the American Battlefield Trust and its partners acquired and preserved 180 acres at the battlefield.

The Kettle Creek Battlefield was awarded an "affiliated area" status of the National Park Service (NPS) in January 2021.

== See also ==
- American Revolutionary War § War in the South. Places 'Battle of Kettle Creek' in overall sequence and strategic context.

== Notes ==
- Ashmore, Otis; Olmstead, Charles (June 1926). "The Battles of Kettle Creek and Brier Creek". The Georgia Historical Quarterly. 10 (2): 85–125. JSTOR 40575848.
- Buchanan, John (2004). The Road to Valley Forge. Hoboken, NJ: John Wiley. ISBN 978-0-471-44156-4. OCLC 231991487.
- Davis, Jr, Robert Scott (April 1979). "The Loyalist Trials at Ninety Six in 1779". The South Carolina Historical Magazine. 80 (2): 172–181. JSTOR 27567552.
- Elliott, Daniel (2009). Stirring up a Hornet's Nest: The Kettle Creek Battlefield Survey (PDF). Savannah, GA: The Lamar Institute. Archived from the original (PDF) on June 12, 2010. Contains detailed archaeological and historiographic analysis, orders of battle; issued in 2009 for the town of Washington, GA.
- Hall, Leslie (2001). Land and Allegiance in Revolutionary Georgia. Athens, GA: University of Georgia Press. ISBN 978-0-8203-2262-9. OCLC 247101654.
- Mattern, David (1998). Benjamin Lincoln and the American Revolution (paperback ed.). Columbia, SC: University of South Carolina Press. ISBN 978-1-57003-260-8. OCLC 39401358.
- Piecuch, Jim (2008). Three Peoples, One King : Loyalists, Indians, and Slaves in the Revolutionary South, 1775–1782. Columbia, SC: University of South Carolina Press. ISBN 978-1-57003-737-5. OCLC 185031351.
- Russell, David Lee (2000). The American Revolution in the Southern Colonies. Jefferson, NC: McFarland. ISBN 978-0-7864-0783-5. OCLC 248087936.
- Wilson, David K (2005). The Southern Strategy: Britain's Conquest of South Carolina and Georgia, 1775–1780. Columbia, SC: University of South Carolina Press. ISBN 1-57003-573-3. OCLC 232001108.
