= Andrew Pickens (congressman) =

Revolutionary War militia general in South Carolina (1739–1817)

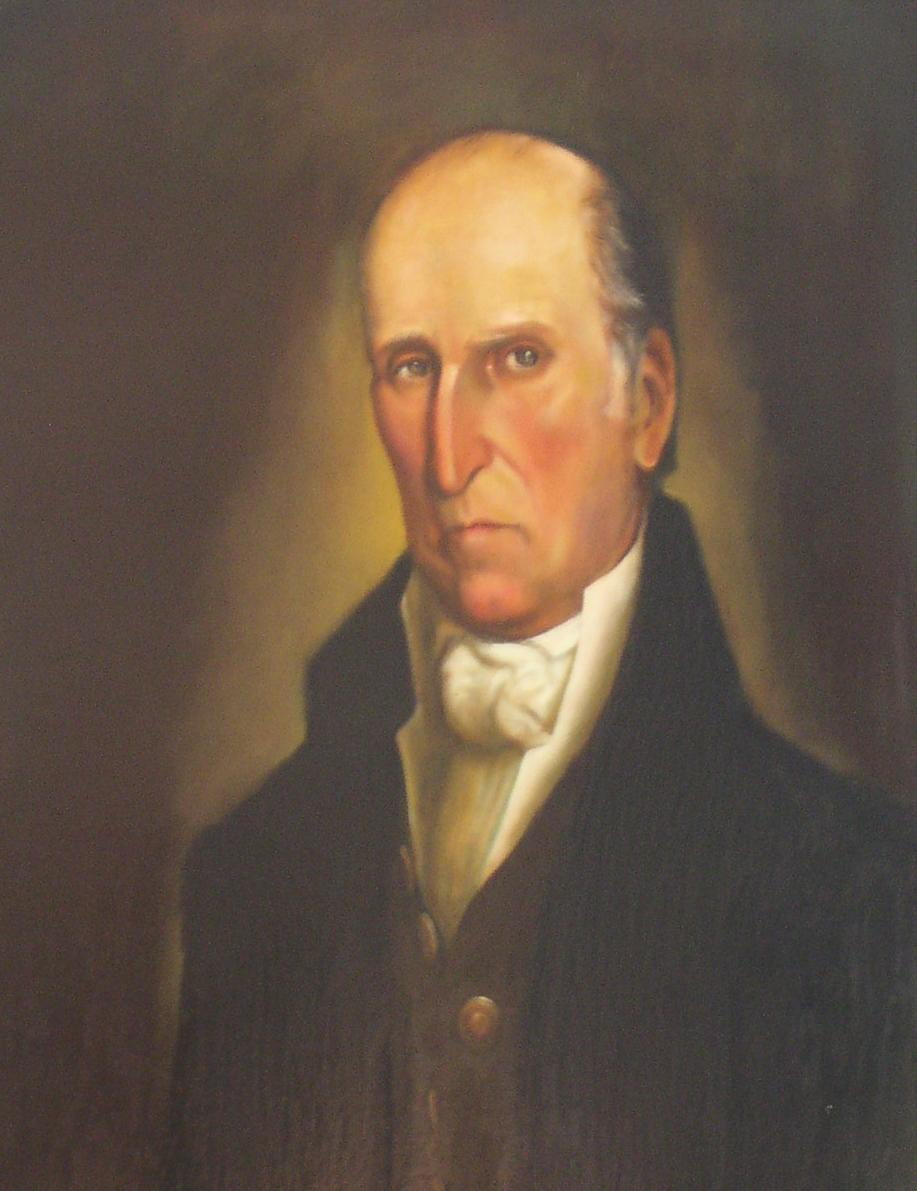

Member of the U.S. House of Representatives from South Carolina's 6th district
- In office March 4, 1793 – March 3, 1795
- Preceded by: District established
- Succeeded by: Samuel Earle

Personal details
- Born: September 13, 1739 Bucks County, Pennsylvania, British America
- Died: August 11, 1817 (aged 77) Tamassee, South Carolina, U.S.
- Party: Anti-Administration
- Spouse: Rebecca Calhoun (m. 1765)
- Profession: Military officer, surveyor, slave-owner, planter
- Nickname: "The Wizard Owl" "The Fighting Elder"

Military service
- Allegiance: Great Britain; United States
- Branch/service: South Carolina Militia
- Years of service: 1760–1761 (Britain); 1775–1783 (United States)
- Rank: Brigadier general
- Commands: Salisbury District Brigade (North Carolina militia), Upper Ninety-Six District Regiment (South Carolina Militia)
- Battles/wars: Anglo-Cherokee War; American Revolutionary War; Battle of Kettle Creek; Siege of Charleston; Battle of Cowpens; Pyle's Massacre; Siege of Augusta; Siege of Ninety Six; Battle of Eutaw Springs

Andrew Pickens (September 13, 1739 – August 11, 1817) was a militia leader in the American Revolution. A planter and slaveowner, he developed his Hopewell plantation on the east side of the Keowee River across from the Cherokee town of Isunigu (Seneca) in western South Carolina. He was elected as a member of the United States House of Representatives from western South Carolina. Several treaties with the Cherokee were negotiated and signed at his plantation of Hopewell.

== Early life ==
Pickens was born in 1739 in Bucks County in the Province of Pennsylvania. He was the son of Scots-Irish immigrants, Presbyterians of primarily Scottish ancestry from Carrickfergus in County Antrim, Ireland (in what is today Northern Ireland.) His parents were Andrew Pickens Sr. and Anne (née Davis). But his paternal great-grandparents were ethnic French Huguenots: Robert Andrew Pickens (Robert André Picon) had migrated to England and Northern Ireland; his wife Esther-Jeanne, widow Bonneau, was from La Rochelle, France and had settled in South Carolina along with other Huguenot refugees fleeing religious persecution as Protestants.

His family traveled the Great Wagon Road in the Shenandoah Valley in hopes of finding a new home. Records show they first settled in the Shenandoah Valley in Virginia. In 1752, his family moved to the Waxhaws on the South Carolina frontier.

== Move to frontier South Carolina ==
Pickens sold his farm there in 1764 and bought land in Abbeville County, South Carolina, near the Georgia border. He married Rebecca Calhoun there and they started a family. In addition to meeting other ethnic Scots-Irish and new immigrants to the area, he became acquainted with his Cherokee neighbors. He built a blockhouse as a base for training.

He established the Hopewell Plantation on the east side of the Keowee River. Several treaty negotiating sessions were held here with the Cherokee. Each resulted in a Treaty of Hopewell. Just across the river was the Cherokee town of Isunigu, also known as "Seneca".

A religious man, Pickens was known as the "Fighting Elder" because of his strong Presbyterian faith.

== Military career ==
Pickens served in the Anglo-Cherokee War in 1760–1761. When the Revolutionary War started, he sided with the rebel militia and was made a captain. He rose to the rank of brigadier general in the South Carolina militia during the war.

He emerged as a military leader in Long Cane, fighting against the Cherokee who had allied with the Loyalists. In 1779, Henry Clinton deployed British soldiers to both South Carolina and North Carolina to encourage Loyalist support. On February 14, 1779, Colonel Pickens and his 300-man militia overtook the larger British force of 700–800 men under Colonel Boyd at the Battle of Kettle Creek in Wilkes County, Georgia, just south of the Long Canes. His victory at Kettle Creek slowed the recruitment of the Loyalists. However, when the British defeated the Southern Continental Army in 1780 in the Siege of Charleston, Pickens surrendered a fort in the Ninety-Six District. He, along with his 300 militia men, on parole oath, agreed to sit out the war.

Pickens's parole did not last, however. After Tory raiders destroyed most of his property and frightened his family, he informed the British that they had violated the terms of parole. He rejoined the war. During this period, Pickens joined Francis Marion (known as the Swamp Fox) and Thomas Sumter as the most well-known partisan leaders in the Carolinas. Sumter also resumed fighting under similar circumstances. He saw action at the Battle of Cowpens, Siege of Augusta, Siege of Ninety-Six, and the Battle of Eutaw Springs.

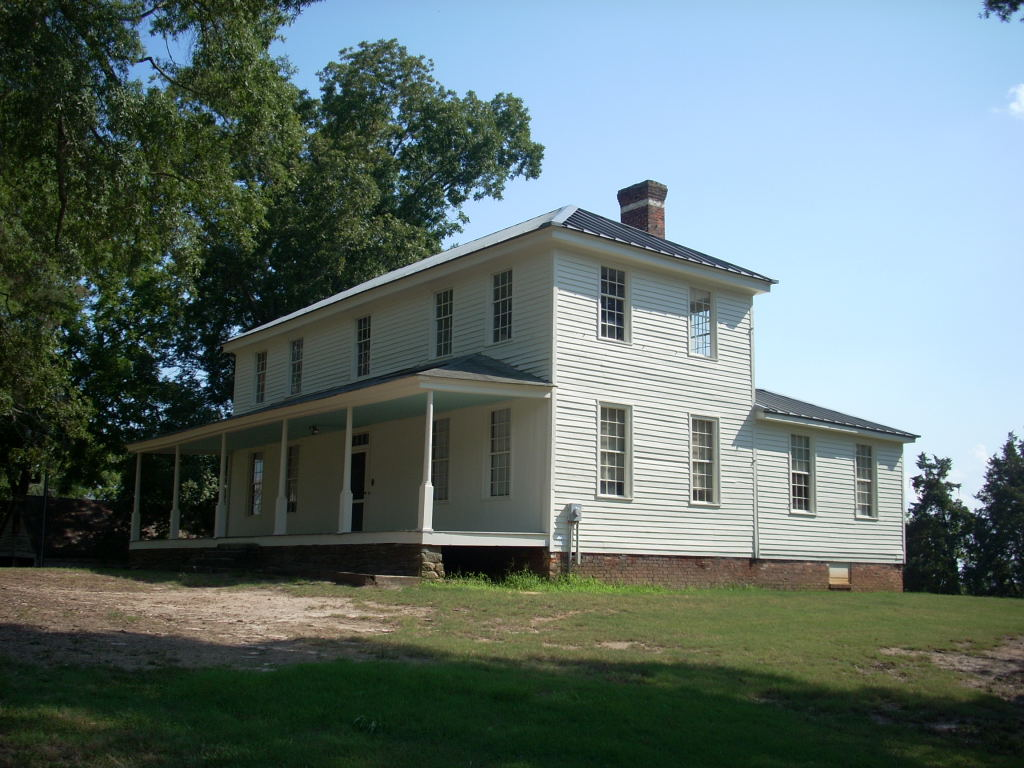
Hopewell, Clemson (Pickens County, South Carolina)

Pickens also led a campaign in north Georgia against the Cherokee late in the war; they had allied with the British in an effort to expel European Americans from their territory. His victorious campaign resulted in the Cherokee ceding significant portions of land between the Savannah and Chattahoochee rivers in the Long Swamp Treaty, signed in what is currently Pickens County, Georgia. Pickens led a detached militia of 25 men to battle against a Cherokee force of an estimated 150 men in what came to be called the "Ring Fight." Pickens gained the respect of these Natives. After the war, he was well-regarded by Native Americans that he dealt with; he was given the name Skyagunsta, "The Wizard Owl," which is reportedly a name based on a well-regarded previous chief of the Cherokee.

- Cowpens, South Carolina: January 17, 1781:

At the Battle of Cowpens, Brig. General Daniel Morgan gave Pickens command of the militia, which played a pivotal role in the battle. On the evening of January 16, Morgan personally instructed the militia to hold its ground and then retreat. On the morning of January 17, Pickens and the militia carried out the plan perfectly. The militia fired two rounds before retreating, something not done in previous battles and untypical of a militia. After the second round, they led Lt. Colonel Banastre Tarleton and the British to blindly charge, drawing them into a double envelopment where they were soundly defeated. This battle proved to be a turning point in the war in the South, and following Cowpens, South Carolina Governor John Rutledge promoted Pickens to brigadier general. He was also awarded a sword by Congress.

- February to March 1781:

After the death of Brig. Gen. (Pro Tempore) William Lee Davidson on February 1, 1781, the colonels of the Salisbury District Brigade of North Carolina "elected" Pickens to lead them since he was a recently appointed brigadier general in South Carolina with no men to lead. He was active in February and very early March only.

- Augusta, Georgia: May 22 – June 5, 1781:

Pickens's militia was soon recalled to defend their own homes, and so he missed the Battle of Guilford Courthouse on March 15, 1781. In April, he raised a regiment of state regulars. In May 1781, Maj. General Nathanael Greene sent Pickens and Lt. Colonel Henry Lee to support Elijah Clarke in operations against Augusta, Georgia. The siege began on May 22 and, after maneuvering, securing outposts and the cutting off of reinforcements by the Patriots, Colonel Thomas Brown surrendered Augusta on June 5, 1781.

- Ninety Six, South Carolina: May 22 – June 19, 1781:

Following the surrender of Augusta, Pickens and Lt. Colonel Lee joined General Greene in his siege at Ninety Six, South Carolina. Greene had begun his siege on May 22, 1781, the same day that Augusta had been besieged. On June 11, Greene ordered Pickens and Lt. Colonel William Washington to aid Thomas Sumter in blocking a relief column led by Lord Rawdon. However, Sumter instead moved to Fort Granby, South Carolina, allowing Rawdon to make his way to Ninety Six. On June 19, Greene had to give up the siege and retreat after a failed assault.

- Eutaw Springs, Charleston, South Carolina: September 8, 1781:

Under the command of General Nathanael Greene, Pickens led his militia in one of the final major battles in the South. With the aid of Henry Lee and Francis Marion, the Patriots fought the British at the Battle of Eutaw Springs. Although more Patriots died than Loyalists and British, the efforts made by the Patriots forced the British to lose control of the South for the rest of the war.

== Political career ==
At the end of the war, Pickens was elected to public office in the South Carolina House of Representatives from 1781 to 1794. He was a South Carolina delegate to the Constitutional Convention. Pickens was later elected to the Third Congress, served from 1793 to 1795 as an Anti-Administration member, opposing the policies of US Secretary of the Treasury Alexander Hamilton. He was one of nine representatives, and the only representative of the Anti-Administration party, to vote against the Eleventh Amendment to the United States Constitution.

== Family ==
Pickens married Rebecca Floride Calhoun in 1765. They had 12 children: Mary Pickens (1766–1836); Ezekiel Pickens (1768–1813), Ann Pickens (1770–1846), son (1772), Jane Pickens (1773–1816); Margaret Pickens (1777–1830); Andrew Pickens Jr. (1779–1838), son (1782); Rebecca Pickens (1784–1831); Catherine Pickens (1786–1871) and Joseph Pickens (1791–1853). Ezekiel Pickens was elected as lieutenant governor of South Carolina, serving from 1802 to 1804. His younger brother Andrew Pickens Jr. also went into politics; he was elected as governor of South Carolina, serving 1817–1819. A grandson was Francis Wilkinson Pickens, who was also elected as governor of South Carolina, serving from 1860 to 1862.

Pickens died near Tamassee, South Carolina, in Oconee County, on August 11, 1817. He is buried at Old Stone Church Cemetery in Clemson, South Carolina.

Pickens was an uncle (through his marriage to Rebecca Florida Calhoun) to John C. Calhoun (1782–1850), who was a leading American politician and political theorist from South Carolina during the first half of the 19th century. Calhoun's home, Fort Hill, is now located on the campus of Clemson University in Pickens County, South Carolina. It is a noted historic landmark in the state of South Carolina.

== Legacy and memorials ==
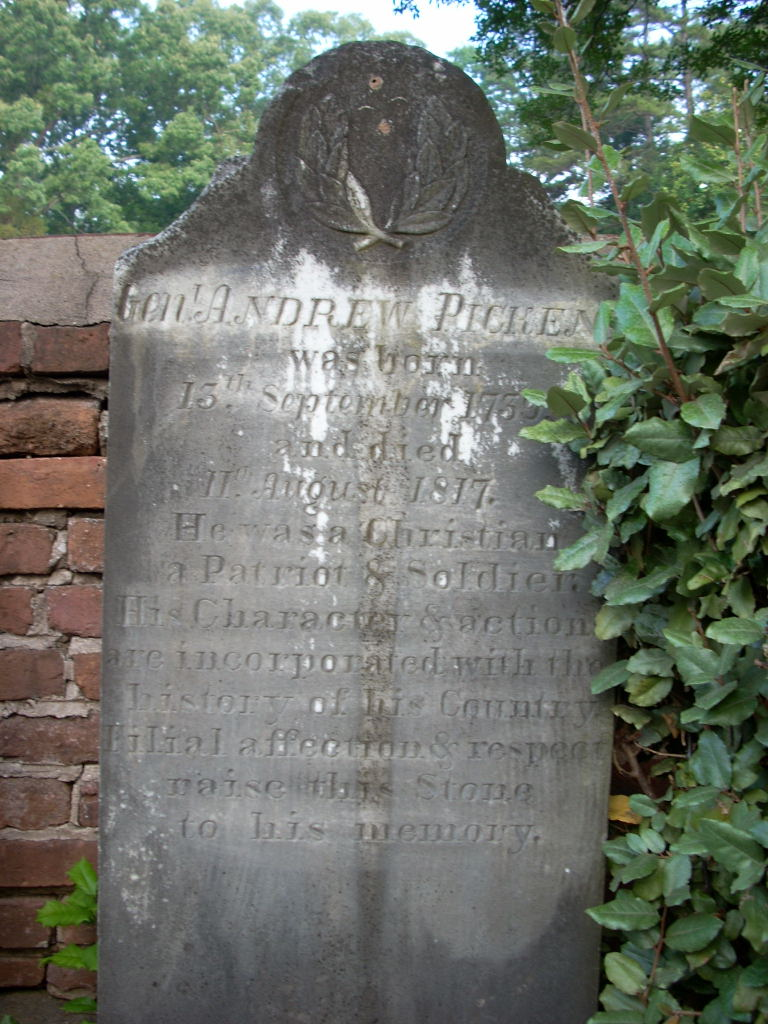
Andrew Pickens's grave marker at Old Stone Church cemetery

Fort Pickens in Florida is named in his honor. Also named after him are Pickens County in Alabama; Georgia; and South Carolina. There is also a city of Pickens, South Carolina. He is the namesake of Pickens High School.

His Hopewell plantation is now owned and maintained by Clemson University.

Pickens was a 7th great-grandfather of former US senator and 2004 presidential candidate John Edwards.

Pickens and his actions served as one of the models for the fictional character of Benjamin Martin in The Patriot, a motion picture released in 2000. In a scene prior to the Battle of Cowpens, Benjamin Martin (character) asks the militia for two rounds before they retreat, reminiscent of Daniel Morgan in the Battle of Cowpens.

U.S. House of Representatives
Preceded by District established	Member of the U.S. House of Representatives from South Carolina's 6th congressional district 1793–1795	Succeeded by Samuel Earle
