= Thomas Brown (loyalist) =

British planter and military officer (1750–1825)

- Born: May 27, 1750; Whitby, Yorkshire, England
- Died: 3 August 1825 (aged 75); Grand Sable Plantation, Saint Vincent
- Military career
- Allegiance: Great Britain
- Service years: 1776–1781
- Rank: Lieutenant-Colonel
- Unit: King's Carolina Rangers
- Conflicts: American Revolutionary War: Siege of Savannah; Second Battle of Augusta

Lieutenant-Colonel Thomas Brown (27 May 1750 – 3 August 1825) was a British planter and military officer. Intending to become a quiet colonial landowner, instead he lived a turbulent and combative career. During the American War of Independence, he was a prominent Loyalist in the Province of Georgia and served as an officer in the King's Carolina Rangers. Following the American victory in the war, Brown was exiled first to East Florida, and later to Saint Vincent in the Caribbean.

== Early life ==
Thomas Brown was born in Whitby, Yorkshire, on 27 May 1750 into a prosperous merchant family; his father Jonas owned a successful shipping company and claimed descent from Anthony Browne, 1st Viscount Montagu. In 1774, aged 24, Thomas recruited colonists and indentured servants from Whitby and the Orkney Islands, and emigrated with them to the Province of Georgia. Financed by £3,000 of family capital, he established the community of Brownsborough and a 5,600 acre plantation northeast of present-day Augusta, anticipating life as a gentleman planter.

== Revolution ==
Brown soon found himself embroiled in the coming revolution. On 2 August 1775 a crowd of 130 Sons of Liberty confronted him at his house and demanded he pledge himself to the Patriot cause. Brown requested the liberty to hold his own opinions, saying that he could "never enter into an Engagement to take up arms against the Country which gave him being", and finally met their demands with pistol and sword. The crowd seized him and struck him with the butt of a musket, fracturing his skull. Taken prisoner, he was tied to a tree where he was roasted by fire and scalped before being tarred and feathered. Brown was then carted through a number of nearby settlements and forced to verbally pledge himself to the Patriot cause before being released. This mistreatment resulted in the loss of two toes and lifelong headaches.

The enraged Brown quickly recanted his pledge and assumed leadership of backcountry Georgia loyalists, developing a plan to support Augusta area Tories with Indian allies from the West and a landing of British soldiers from the East. He helped bring the plan about by living with the Creeks in 1776 and 1777, gaining their confidence, and establishing a network spreading from Florida to the Carolinas. In 1779 he was appointed Superintendent of Creek and Cherokee Indians and continued his efforts to engage them in the conflict.

== The King's Rangers ==
Brown came to lead a mounted Loyalist company styled as the King's (Carolina) Rangers, which over time developed into a uniformed and disciplined unit. Becoming a skilled commander himself, Brown was appointed the rank of provincial Lieutenant Colonel by Major General Augustine Prevost in July 1779. His Rangers fought in Lt-Col. Archibald Campbell's 1778 invasion of Georgia, the 1779 Siege of Savannah, and the Loyalist occupation of Augusta in 1780 and 1781, as well as minor backcountry clashes. In September 1780, Brown maintained a stout defence against Elijah Clarke's surprise attack at the First Battle of Augusta, holding the fortified Mackay House until arrival of a relief force. On June 5, 1781, he was compelled to yield Fort Cornwallis in the Second Battle of Augusta after a spirited and creative defence. Nathanael Greene arranged to have him paroled and escorted to Savannah with his regular troops with the promise they would not re-enter war. Greene was afraid Brown would be killed by his troops in captivity.

Brown's campaign plan achieved temporary success, but ultimately failed due to tardy or insufficient support from local Tories and his Indian allies. His war career was later vilified, but Cashin's research found no historical evidence that he did anything beyond his duty according to the recognized rules of war. It is unlikely that he hanged thirteen prisoners at the Mackay House with savage relish, rather he imposed (or condoned) a widely approved penalty against parole breakers. Brown angrily denied that he ever encouraged Indians to barbarous behaviour.

== Exile to Florida and the Caribbean ==
In late 1782, Thomas Brown with several thousand Tory refugees from Charleston and Savannah relocated to British territory at St. Augustine, Florida. Fully expecting to settle permanently, the newcomers were shocked in 1783 by news that East Florida was ceded to Spain, and British citizens had eighteen months to depart. Even here Brown struck a blow by encouraging his Creek friends to cooperate with the new Spanish authorities in controlling American westward expansion.

The British government continued to provide compensation for dispossessed Tories. In recognition of his loyalism and wartime service, Brown was awarded with extensive tracts of land on the Caribbean islands of North and Middle Caicos. Scattered over 8,000 acres and encompassing thirteen different plantations, Brown raised cattle and cotton through the forced labour of more than 600 enslaved people.

Brown's next destination was Abaco Island in the Bahamas. Brown led Abaco Loyalists in protesting lack of representation in the local Assembly, but the point became moot as the Abaco and later Caicos Islands lands proved unprofitable.

In 1802 Brown returned to Britain and began petitioning for a substitute grant on St. Vincent Island. His status as a former colonizer entitled him to a grant of 6,000 acres in November 1804. Between 1805 and 1806, Brown moved over 600 enslaved people from the Bahamas to his Grand Sable Plantation. In 1815 Brown used slave labour to construct the 360 foot long Black Point Tunnel to enable faster transport of sugar from the mills of Grand Sable Plantation to the wharf at Byrea.

Brown resided on St. Vincent Island until his death at Grand Sable Plantation in 1825.

== In popular culture ==
Thomas Brown appears as a prominent character in The Hornet's Nest, a novel written by former United States President and Georgia governor, Jimmy Carter.
