= Siege of Augusta =

1781 siege of the American Revolutionary War

Coordinates: 33°28′12.00″N 81°58′30.00″W

- Part of the American Revolutionary War
Date	May 22 – June 6, 1781
Location	Augusta, Georgia
Result	American victory

Belligerents
United States	Great Britain

Commanders and leaders
Andrew Pickens; Henry Lee; Elijah Clarke	Thomas Brown (surrendered)

Strength
1,600	630

Casualties and losses
16 killed; 35 wounded	52 killed; 334 captured

The siege of Augusta took place between May 22 and June 6, 1781, during the American Revolutionary War. 1,600 Patriot troops, led by Brigadier General Andrew Pickens and Lieutenant Colonel Henry Lee III successfully besieged Augusta, Georgia, which was defended by 600 Loyalist troops under Thomas Brown. Fort Cornwallis, the primary Loyalist defence, was successfully exposed to cannon fire by the construction of a tower 30 feet (9.1 m) high on which the Patriots mounted a small cannon, resulting in Brown surrendering on June 6.

== Background ==
The arrival of the British regular army in Georgia in 1778 was shortly followed by the occupation of Augusta by loyalist Lieutenant Colonel Thomas Brown, leading the East Florida Rangers on January 31, 1779. Brown and the East Florida Rangers retreated from Augusta following the American victory at the Battle of Kettle Creek in February 1779.

Brown and his unit, renamed the King's Carolina Rangers retook Augusta on June 8, 1780. On 14 September 1780 Elijah Clarke and Patriot forces launched a surprise assault on British-held Augusta. The four day siege was unsuccessful and Clarke raised the siege, retreating on 18 September.

Clarke's militia re-entered Wilkes County in April 1781. Joined by Brigadier General Andrew Pickens' militia and Lieutenant Colonel Henry Lee's continentals, they arrived outside Augusta on May 21, 1781.

== Siege ==
On April 16, Patriot militia companies under the command of Micajah Williamson arrived on the outskirts of Augusta, Georgia and established a fortified camp. The garrison of the town's primary fortification, Fort Cornwallis, was held by the King's Carolina Rangers commanded by Loyalist Thomas Brown, and did not immediately confront Williamson due to exaggerated reports of his troop strength. Pickens maneuvered a force of 400 men between Augusta and Ninety Six, South Carolina to prevent the British outpost there from reinforcing Brown. On May 15, Williamson was joined by his commander, Elijah Clarke and another 100 men, effectively cutting British supply lines.

Major General Nathanael Greene had sent Lee to attempt the capture of Ninety Six, but when Lee neared he learned that the town had been fortified in anticipation of Greene's arrival. Greene then ordered Lee to assist Pickens at Augusta. Pressing on, Lee reached Augusta after traveling 75 miles (121 km) in three days. On May 21, the stockaded house of George Galphin, an Indian agent, located 12 miles (19 km) south of Augusta, was attacked by forces under Clarke and Lee. After a brief exchange, in which one American died of heatstroke and eight to ten were wounded, the garrison there surrendered after three or four men were killed. A total of 126 men, mostly regulars, surrendered. The prize (and the reason for the Patriot attack) was much-needed supplies and military equipment which had been intended for distribution to the local Indians.

Fort Grierson was a secondary fortified outpost located about half a mile (0.8 km) from Fort Cornwallis. This fort was defended by about 80 men under Colonel Grierson. On May 23 the Patriot forces began to encircle the fort in a manner intended to draw Grierson out in an attempt to reach Fort Cornwallis. Brown, aware of the danger to Grierson, sallied forth from Cornwallis, but when faced with Lee's strength, limited his support attempt to an ineffective cannonade. Grierson, desperate to escape the trap, attempted to flee along the riverbank but his entire company was captured. Clarke's men then took their revenge for Brown's alleged atrocities and refused quarter, summarily executing Grierson and all of his men.

The forces defending Cornwallis numbered about 300 Loyalist troops, who were assisted in defensive works by about 200 Black Americans. The fort was well-constructed and the Patriots could not find a ready means of attack, since they only had a single cannon. At Lee's suggestion they decided to use a stratagem that had met with success at the siege of Fort Watson. Under cover of a nearby house, they constructed a wooden tower about 30 feet (9.1 m) high. During its construction Brown made several further sorties, but Lee's men fought them off each time. The tower was high enough to top the fort's walls on June 1 and the Patriots began firing into the fort. That night Brown led most of the garrison out and a pitched battle ensued in which Brown was once again forced to retreat behind his defenses. He then sent out one of his men, pretending to be a deserter, to gain access to the tower with a view to setting it on fire. He suggested to Lee that he could direct the cannon at the fort's magazine, and had very nearly succeeded in his quest when Lee somehow became suspicious and had him placed under guard.

The cannon atop the tower continued to rake the interior of the fort, knocking guns off their mounts and destroying the barracks. The Patriot leaders then began planning an attack on the fort, exploring places to position sharpshooters in the few remaining houses near the fort. On the night of June 3 the last remaining house exploded. Brown had sent sappers to undermine the house, expecting it to be used for such purposes, and the explosive charge had gone off before the building was occupied. Patriot forces lined up for assault on the morning of June 4, and Pickens and Lee sent in a surrender demand, which Brown turned down. In deference to the fact that it was the George III's birthday, the attack was delayed one day. On June 5, Brown offered to negotiate terms of surrender. To avoid a repeat of Grierson's fate, he was specifically surrendered to a detachment of Continental Army troops from North Carolina, as a number of the local militia were interested in seeing him dead over Patriot allegations of his brutality.

== Aftermath ==
Brown survived the war, moving first to Florida and then the Bahamas.
