= Elijah Clarke =

United States military officer and legislator

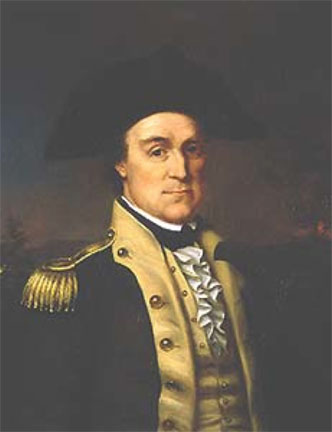
- Portrait by Rembrandt Peale

Member of the Georgia House of Representatives
- In office 1781 - 1790

Personal details
- Born: 1742 Edgecombe County, Province of North Carolina
- Died: December 15, 1799 (aged 56–57)
- Children: Elijah Clarke-Dubay Jr. John Clark (governor)
- Parent: John Clarke
- Relatives: Edward Clark (grandson)
- Occupation: Military officer

Military service
- Allegiance: United States
- Branch/service: Continental Army
- Rank: Lieutenant Colonel
- Unit: Georgia Militia
- Commands: Wilkes County Militia
- Battles/wars: American Revolutionary War: Battle of Kettle Creek; Battle of Musgrove Mill (WIA); Siege of Augusta

Elijah Clarke (1742 – December 15, 1799) was an American military officer and Georgia legislator.

== Career ==
Elijah Clarke was born near Tarboro in Edgecombe County, Province of North Carolina, the son of John Clarke of Anson County, North Carolina. served in the Georgia Militia during the American Revolutionary War. When the state troops disbanded after the surrender of Savannah, he became a lieutenant colonel in the Wilkes County Militia. He fought in the southern theater and served under Col. Andrew Pickens in the Battle of Kettle Creek. He was one of three American commanders at the Battle of Musgrove’s Mill, during which he was wounded.

After the war, Clarke was elected to the Georgia legislature, serving from 1781 - 1790. In early 1794, he was asked if he'd be interested in leading a French invasion of Spanish East Florida, but President George Washington persuaded the French government to cancel the project. Instead of invading Florida, Clarke led men from Wilkes County into Creek lands. In 1794 he organized the Trans-Oconee Republic, several settlements in traditional Creek territory. He was forced to withdraw his settlements by Georgia Governor George Matthews.

== Death and legacy ==
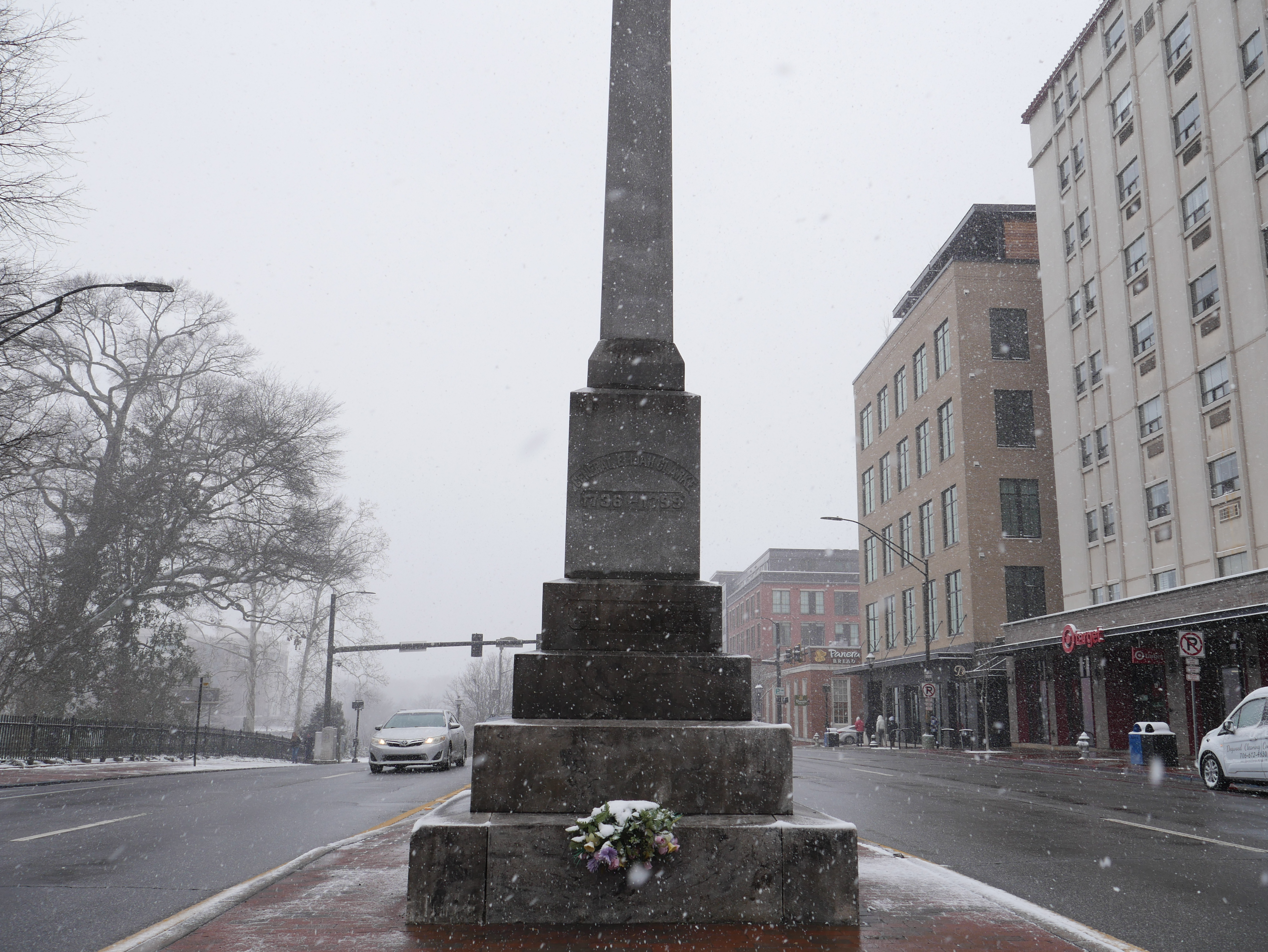
Monument to Clarke in Athens, Georgia

Clarke died on December 15, 1799.

Clarke and his actions served as one of the sources for the fictional character of Benjamin Martin in The Patriot, a film released in 2000. He is also a major character in the historical novel The Hornet's Nest by Jimmy Carter.

Clarke County in Georgia is named after Elijah Clarke.
