= Augustine Prevost =

Genevan army officer

Major-General Augustine Prevost
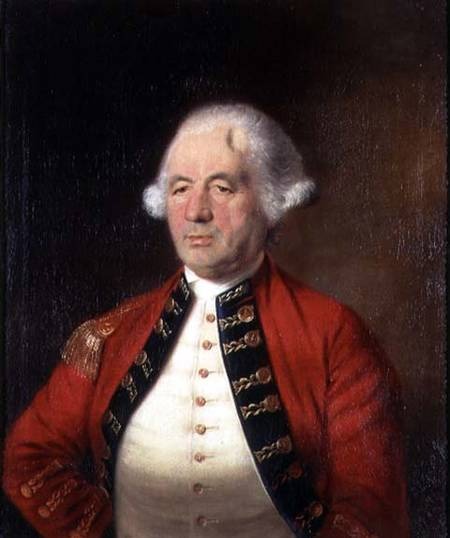
- Portrait by Mather Brown
- Born: Augustin Prevost; 22 August 1723; Geneva, Republic of Geneva
- Died: 5 May 1786 (aged 62); London, England
- Relatives: Jacques Marcus Prevost (brother); George Prevost (son); James Charles Prevost (grandson)
- Military career
- Allegiance: Sardinia; Dutch Republic; Great Britain
- Branch: Royal Sardinian Army; Dutch States Army; British Army
- Rank: Major-General (British Army)
- Nickname: Old Bullet Head
- Unit: 60th Regiment of Foot
- Conflicts: French and Indian War (WIA); American War of Independence; Siege of Savannah

Major-General Augustine Prevost (born Augustin Prevost; 22 August 1723 – 5/6 May 1786) was a Genevan army officer best known for his service in the British Army during the Seven Years' War and American War of Independence.

== Early life and career ==
Prevost was born on 22 August 1723 in Geneva. He was the son of Augustin Prevost, a member of Geneva's Council of Two Hundred, and Louise Martine. He began his military career in the Royal Sardinian Army, and later served as an officer in Dutch States Army.

== Career in the British Army ==
Like his younger brothers Jacques-Marc (1736–1781) and Jacques (1725–1776), Prevost entered British service as a major in the 60th Regiment of Foot (Royal American Regiment) at the regiment's establishment in 1756. He fought and was wounded during the North American phase of the Seven Years' War, known in the United States as the 'French and Indian War.'

In 1763 he briefly acted as the interim military Governor of West Florida. After the war, Prevost was posted to the West Indies, where he served as deputy inspector general at Kingston, Jamaica. He was promoted to colonel in 1774.

=== American War of Independence ===
By the summer of 1776, Prevost was in charge of a contingent of the 60th stationed in St. Augustine, the capital of British East Florida. In the winter of 1778, following a proposal of Lord George Germain, Prevost, now a brigadier general, was given orders by General Sir Henry Clinton to invade Georgia. Prevost dispatched two units north: one under the command of lieutenant-colonel Lewis V. Fuser and the other under his brother Jacques-Marc.

Prevost arrived at Savannah, Georgia on 17 January 1779 which was protected by British Lieutenant Colonel Archibald Campbell. Prevost assumed command but also sent the message to General Clinton that he wished to resign, believing that a younger man should take his place. In May 1779, his troops launched an unsuccessful raid against Charles Town, South Carolina, and looted the countryside during their retreat. The major engagement of the affair was the Battle of Stono Creek, a British victory. In September 1779, Brigadier General George Garth was sent to replace him, travelling from New York on HMS Experiment. Garth was, however, captured before he could reach Savannah and Prevost remained to defend the town from a combined French and Continental force in an action that came to be known as the siege of Savannah.

Prevost retired to England in 1780. He died in East Barnet, London on 5 or 6 May 1786.

== Personal life ==
In 1765, Prevost married Anne Grand, daughter of Swiss banker Georges Grand, who managed loans granted by France to the United States during the Independence War. He was the father of Governor-General of Canada Sir George Prevost. He was a member of the Albany Masonic Temple after 1768.

Some of Prevost's descendants settled in New York state and New Jersey in the United States, and in Peru, South America.

== Bibliography ==
- A regimental chronicle and list of officers of the 60th, or the King's, royal rifle corps by Nesbit Willoughby Wallace
- Notices généalogiques sur les familles-genevoises by Jacques Augustin Galiffe, Eugène Ritter, Louis Dufour-Vernes, 1833, p. 277.
- "The American Revolution in the Southern Colonies" by David Lee Russell
- O'Byrne, William Richard (1849). "Prevost, James Charles" . A Naval Biographical Dictionary. p. 925.

Military offices
Preceded by Gabriel Christie	Colonel-Commandant of the 2nd Battalion, 60th Regiment of Foot; 1779–1786	Succeeded by Gabriel Christie
