= Abraham Alexander =

Public figure in North Carolina (1718–1786)

- Born: December 9, 1717; Cecil County, Maryland, U.S.
- Died: April 23, 1786 (aged 68); Charlotte, Mecklenburg County, North Carolina, U.S.
- Resting place: Sugar Creek Presbyterian Church Cemetery, Charlotte, Mecklenburg County, North Carolina, U.S.
- Occupation: statesman
- Known for: he signed the Mecklenburg Declaration of Independence
- Father: Francis Alexander

Abraham Alexander (December 9, 1717 – April 23, 1786) was a public figure in Mecklenburg County, North Carolina, during the American Revolution. He chaired the meetings that produced the radical Mecklenburg Resolves and, allegedly, the Mecklenburg Declaration of Independence.

== Early life ==
Alexander was born probably in Cecil County, Maryland, on December 9, 1717, the son of Francis Alexander (mother’s name unknown). He migrated to the frontier of the province of North Carolina with many other Scots-Irish colonists, and became a leader in the Scots-Irish community. He was one of the Presbyterian leaders who obtained a charter for Queen's College (subsequently known as Queen's Museum), which was a forerunner of Queens University of Charlotte. The college was permanently closed in 1780 during the American Revolutionary War, when British troops invaded the area.

When Mecklenburg County was created in 1762, Alexander was appointed as one of the county's first justices of the peace. That same year he became an officer in the local militia. In 1768 he was among the trustees who founded the town of Charlotte, and the following year he was elected to the North Carolina General Assembly.

Before the American Revolution, the Scots-Irish of North Carolina were generally supportive of the British royal governors of the province, which often put them at odds with other colonists. In 1765, Alexander was beaten by squatters while he was attempting to survey land for royal officials. In 1771, Alexander and his militiamen responded to Governor Tryon's call for support in putting down the Regulators, but the Mecklenburg men arrived too late to participate in the Battle of Alamance.

== American Revolution ==
This support for the royal governors ended in the early stages of the American Revolution. After Governor Josiah Martin dissolved the North Carolina Assembly in 1774, Alexander was elected to the first North Carolina Provincial Congress.

He was a member of the colonial legislature before 1775, and when that year the royalist governor attempted to oppose the people in their right to free speech, he was elected president of an indignation meeting held in the court house at Charlotte, at the call of Col. Thomas Polk. He was made permanent chairman of the subsequent meeting held May 31, 1775, that issued the Mecklenburg Declaration of Independence, providing for a republican form of government, and renouncing allegiance to Great Britain, then this document was transmitted to Philadelphia by a special messenger in August, 1775, after having been read in mass meetings to the people in different parts of the state.

According to testimony first published many years after the event, the delegates adopted and signed the Mecklenburg Declaration of Independence on May 20. If the story is true, the Mecklenburg Declaration preceded the United States Declaration of Independence by more than a year, but the authenticity of the Mecklenburg Declaration is discounted by most modern historians. The meeting also produced (on May 31) the radical Mecklenburg Resolves, the authenticity of which is not questioned, which effectively ended British authority in Mecklenburg County.

== Last years ==
Whether Alexander helped draft either of these documents is not known. Based on the traditions surrounding the Mecklenburg Declaration, older histories of North Carolina in the American Revolution portrayed Alexander as a major figure in the local revolutionary movement. According to Converse D. Clowse, modern academic historians find little documentary evidence to support this traditional view. Alexander's public service clearly indicates that he was trusted by the community, but the degree to which he made major decisions and helped shape public opinion cannot be determined from the surviving contemporary evidence.

Alexander was known to have served as a private, then as a sergeant in 1780 for the Mecklenburg County Regiment under Capt. Samuel Givens, and back again to private. He fought at the Battle of Camden in South Carolina on August 16, 1780.

Alexander died in Charlotte, Mecklenburg County, North Carolina, on April 23, 1786. He is buried with his wife Dorcas in the graveyard at Sugar Creek Presbyterian Church in Charlotte.

== Sources ==
- Clowse, Converse D. (1999). "Alexander, Abraham". American National Biography Online. Oxford University Press.
- Lewis, J. D. (2012). "Abram Alexander, Sergeants". The American Revolution in North Carolina – via carolana.com.

Attribution
