= Mecklenburg Declaration of Independence =

Purported and unproven colonial declaration of independence document

The flag of North Carolina bears the date of the Mecklenburg Declaration: May 20, 1775.

The Mecklenburg Declaration of Independence is a text published in 1819 with the now disputed claim that it was the first declaration of independence made in the Thirteen Colonies during the American Revolution. It was supposedly signed on May 20, 1775, in Charlotte, North Carolina, by a committee of citizens of Mecklenburg County, who declared independence from Great Britain after hearing of the battle of Concord. If true, the Mecklenburg Declaration preceded the United States Declaration of Independence by more than a year.

Professional historians have maintained that the Mecklenburg Declaration of Independence is an inaccurate rendering of an authentic document known as the Mecklenburg Resolves, an argument first made by Peter Force. The Resolves, a set of radical resolutions passed on May 31, 1775, fell short of an actual declaration of independence. Although published in newspapers in 1775, the text of the Mecklenburg Resolves was lost after the American Revolution and not rediscovered until 1838. Defenders of the Mecklenburg Declaration have argued that both the Mecklenburg Declaration and the Mecklenburg Resolves are authentic.

North Carolinians, convinced that the Mecklenburg Declaration was genuine, and also because of the Halifax Resolves passed by the North Carolina Provincial Congress on April 12, 1776, maintained that they were the first Americans to declare independence from Great Britain. The official seal and the flag of North Carolina display the dates of both the declaration and the Halifax vote. A holiday commemorating the Mecklenburg Declaration, "Meck Dec Day," is celebrated on May 20 in North Carolina, although it is no longer an official holiday and does not attract the attention that it once did.

== Initial publication ==
The Mecklenburg Declaration of Independence was published on April 30, 1819, in an article written by Joseph McKnitt Alexander in the Raleigh Register and North Carolina Gazette, of Raleigh, North Carolina. "It is not probably known to many of our readers," wrote the editor of the Raleigh Register in an introduction to the article, "that the citizens of Mecklenburg County, in this State made a Declaration of Independence more than a year before Congress made theirs."

According to Alexander, his father, John McKnitt Alexander, had been the clerk at a meeting convened in Charlotte on May 19, 1775. Each militia company in Mecklenburg County had sent two delegates to the meeting, where measures were to be discussed regarding the ongoing dispute between the British Empire and the American colonies. Relations between the colonies and British leaders had reached a crisis in Boston, Massachusetts following the 1774 passage of the Coercive Acts by the British Parliament. During the meeting in Mecklenburg County, the delegates received official news that the battle of Lexington had been fought in Massachusetts one month earlier. Outraged by this turn of events, wrote Alexander, the delegates unanimously passed the following resolutions at about 2:00 a.m. on May 20:

1. Resolved, That whosoever directly or indirectly abetted, or in any way, form, or manner, countenanced the uncharted and dangerous invasion of our rights, as claimed by Great Britain, is an enemy to this County, to America, and to the inherent and inalienable rights of man.

2. Resolved, That we the citizens of Mecklenburg County, do hereby dissolve the political bands which have connected us to the Mother Country, and hereby absolve ourselves from all allegiance to the British Crown, and abjure all political connection, contract, or association, with that Nation, who have wantonly trampled on our rights and liberties and inhumanly shed the innocent blood of American patriots at Lexington.

3. Resolved, That we do hereby declare ourselves a free and independent people, are, and of right ought to be, a sovereign and self-governing Association, under the control of no power other than that of our God and the General Government of the Congress; to the maintenance of which independence, we solemnly pledge to each other, our mutual cooperation, our lives, our fortunes, and our most sacred honor.

4. Resolved, That as we now acknowledge the existence and control of no law or legal officer, civil or military, within this County, we do hereby ordain and adopt, as a rule of life, all, each and every of our former laws - where, nevertheless, the Crown of Great Britain never can be considered as holding rights, privileges, immunities, or authority therein.

5. Resolved, That it is also further decreed, that all, each and every military officer in this County, is hereby reinstated to his former command and authority, he acting conformably to these regulations, and that every member present of this delegation shall henceforth be a civil officer, viz. a Justice of the Peace, in the character of a 'Committee-man,' to issue process, hear and determine all matters of controversy, according to said adopted laws, and to preserve peace, and union, and harmony, in said County, and to use every exertion to spread the love of country and fire of freedom throughout America, until a more general and organized government be established in this province.

A few days later, wrote Alexander, Captain James Jack of Charlotte was sent to the Continental Congress in Philadelphia. Jack carried a copy of the resolves and a letter asking North Carolina's congressmen to have the Mecklenburg proceedings approved by Congress. The North Carolina congressional delegation—Richard Caswell, William Hooper, and Joseph Hewes—told Jack that although they supported what had been done, it was premature to discuss a declaration of independence in Congress.

Alexander concluded by writing that although the original documents relating to the Mecklenburg Declaration were destroyed in a fire in 1800, the article was written from a true copy of the papers left to him by his father, who was now deceased.

== Thomas Jefferson's skepticism ==
"Either these resolutions are a plagiarism from Mr. Jefferson's Declaration of Independence, or Mr. Jefferson's Declaration of Independence is a plagiarism from those resolutions."

— John Adams, August 21, 1819

The 1819 article about the Mecklenburg Declaration of Independence was reprinted in many newspapers across the United States. People immediately noticed that, even though the Mecklenburg Declaration was supposedly written more than a year before the 1776 United States Declaration of Independence, the two declarations had some very similar phrases, including "dissolve the political bands which have connected", "absolve ourselves from all allegiance to the British Crown", "are, and of right ought to be", and "pledge to each other, our mutual cooperation, our lives, our fortunes, and our most sacred honor". This raised an obvious question: did Thomas Jefferson, the principal author of the American Declaration of Independence, use the Mecklenburg Declaration as a source?

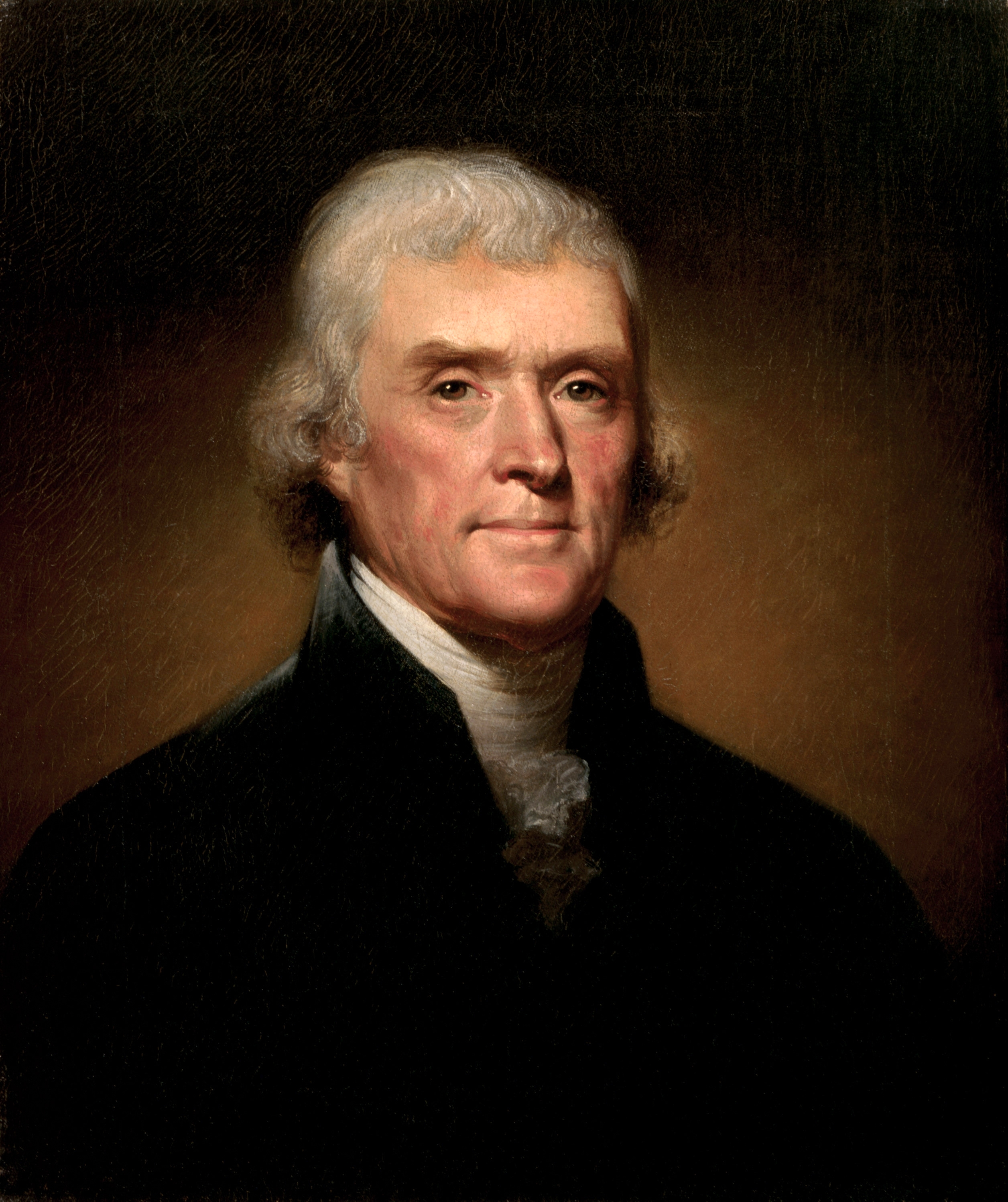
Former President Thomas Jefferson, principal author of the United States Declaration of Independence, suspected that the Mecklenburg Declaration was a hoax.

One person who thought so was John Adams, who like Jefferson was elderly and in retirement when the Mecklenburg Declaration was published in 1819. When Adams read Dr. Alexander's article in a Massachusetts newspaper, he was astonished because he had never previously heard of the Mecklenburg Declaration. He immediately assumed, as he wrote a friend, that Jefferson had "copied the spirit, the sense, and the expressions of it verbatim into his Declaration of the 4th of July, 1776." Adams, who had played a major role in getting the Continental Congress to declare independence in 1776, had become somewhat resentful that Jefferson now received most of the praise for independence just because he had written the now-revered document announcing it. Adams was therefore privately delighted with the emergence of the Mecklenburg Declaration, since it clearly undercut Jefferson's claim to originality and precedence. Adams sent a copy of the article to Jefferson to get his reaction.

Jefferson replied that, like Adams, he had never heard of the Mecklenburg Declaration before. Jefferson found it curious that historians of the American Revolution, even those from North Carolina and nearby Virginia, had never previously mentioned it. He also found it suspicious that the original was lost in a fire and that most of the eyewitnesses were now dead. Jefferson wrote that while he could not claim for certain that the Mecklenburg Declaration was a fabrication, "I shall believe it such until positive and solemn proof of its authenticity shall be produced."

Jefferson's argument, Adams wrote in reply, "has entirely convinced me that the Mecklengburg [sic] Resolutions are a fiction". Adams forwarded Jefferson's letter to the editor of the Massachusetts newspaper, who wrote an article expressing reservations about the Mecklenburg Declaration without mentioning Jefferson or Adams by name. In response to this skepticism, North Carolina senator Nathaniel Macon and others collected eyewitness testimony to the events described in the article. The now elderly witnesses did not agree in every detail, but they generally corroborated the story that a declaration of independence had been read in public in Charlotte, although they were not all certain about the date. Perhaps most importantly, eighty-eight-year-old Captain James Jack was still living, and he confirmed that he had delivered to the Continental Congress a declaration of independence that had been adopted in May 1775. For many, the authenticity of the Mecklenburg Declaration had been firmly established.

== Possible signers ==
After the Mecklenburg Declaration was published in 1819, supporters compiled a list of men who they believed had signed the document. William Polk, who said that he had heard his father Thomas Polk read the Declaration to the public, listed the names of fifteen delegates present when the Declaration was adopted; other testimony produced other names. A pamphlet issued in 1831 by the government of North Carolina listed the names of twenty-six delegates. Eventually, supporters of the Declaration settled on a list of twenty-seven or twenty-eight men who they claimed had signed the document. In alphabetical order, they are:

1. Abraham Alexander
2. Adam Alexander
3. Charles Alexander
4. Ezra Alexander
5. Hezekiah Alexander
6. John McKnitt Alexander
7. Waightstill Avery
8. Hezekiah J. Balch
9. Richard Barry
10. Ephraim Brevard
11. John Davidson
12. Henry Downs
13. John Flenniken
14. John Foard
15. William Graham
16. James Harris
17. Robert Harris
18. Robert Irwin
19. William Kennon
20. Matthew McClure
21. Neil Morrison
22. Duncan Ochiltree
23. Benjamin Patton
24. John Phifer
25. Thomas Polk
26. John Queary
27. David Reese
28. Zacheus Wilson, Sr.

Modern historians have emphasized that the story of the 1775 signing of the Mecklenburg Declaration can be dated no earlier than 1819. There is no contemporaneous evidence of a signing, nor did John McKnitt Alexander mention such an event in his notes. As far as it is known, none of the "signers" ever claimed to have signed the Mecklenburg Declaration.

Most of the listed signers were Scotch-Irish Presbyterians, as were many of the early promoters of the authenticity of the Declaration. Many of the reputed signers were kinsmen, and their descendants were among the staunchest defenders of the Declaration.

Eyewitnesses who provided testimony about the 1775 meeting disagreed about the roles played by some of the signers. John McKnitt Alexander wrote that he had been the secretary at the meeting, but others recalled that Ephraim Brevard had been the secretary. Alexander wrote that his kinsman Adam Alexander had issued the order for the meeting to be convened, but William Polk and other eyewitnesses insisted that Thomas Polk had called the meeting. Abraham Alexander is said to have chaired the meeting.

== Celebration and controversy ==
After 1819, people in North Carolina (and Tennessee, which shared an early history) began to take pride in the previously unheralded Mecklenburg Declaration of Independence. Before then, Virginia and Massachusetts had been given much of the credit for leading the American Revolution. The Mecklenburg Declaration of Independence clearly enhanced North Carolina's role—already notable because of the Halifax Resolves of April 1776—in establishing American independence. The first celebration of the anniversary of the supposed adoption of the Mecklenburg Declaration took place in Charlotte on May 20, 1825.

Many North Carolinians were offended when Thomas Jefferson's skeptical letter about the Mecklenburg Declaration was posthumously published in 1829. In questioning the authenticity of the Mecklenburg Declaration, Jefferson, a Virginian, had impolitically referred to William Hooper, one of North Carolina's signers of the American Declaration of Independence, as a "tory". According to author Hoyt, Jefferson used the term to mean that Hooper had been conservative on declaring independence, not to imply that he had been a Loyalist, but North Carolinians felt their honored Patriots had been slighted.

The state of North Carolina responded to Jefferson's letter in 1831 with an official pamphlet that reprinted the previously published accounts with some additional testimony in support of the Mecklenburg Declaration. This was followed in 1834 with a book by a leading North Carolina historian, Joseph Seawell Jones, entitled A Defence of the Revolutionary History of the State of North Carolina from the Aspersions of Mr. Jefferson. Jones defended the patriotism of William Hooper and accused Jefferson of being envious that a little county in North Carolina had declared independence at a time when the "Sage of Monticello" was still hoping for reconciliation with Great Britain. On May 20, 1835, more than five thousand people gathered in Charlotte to celebrate the Mecklenburg Declaration. In the many toasts celebrating "the first declaration of American independence", Jefferson was never mentioned.

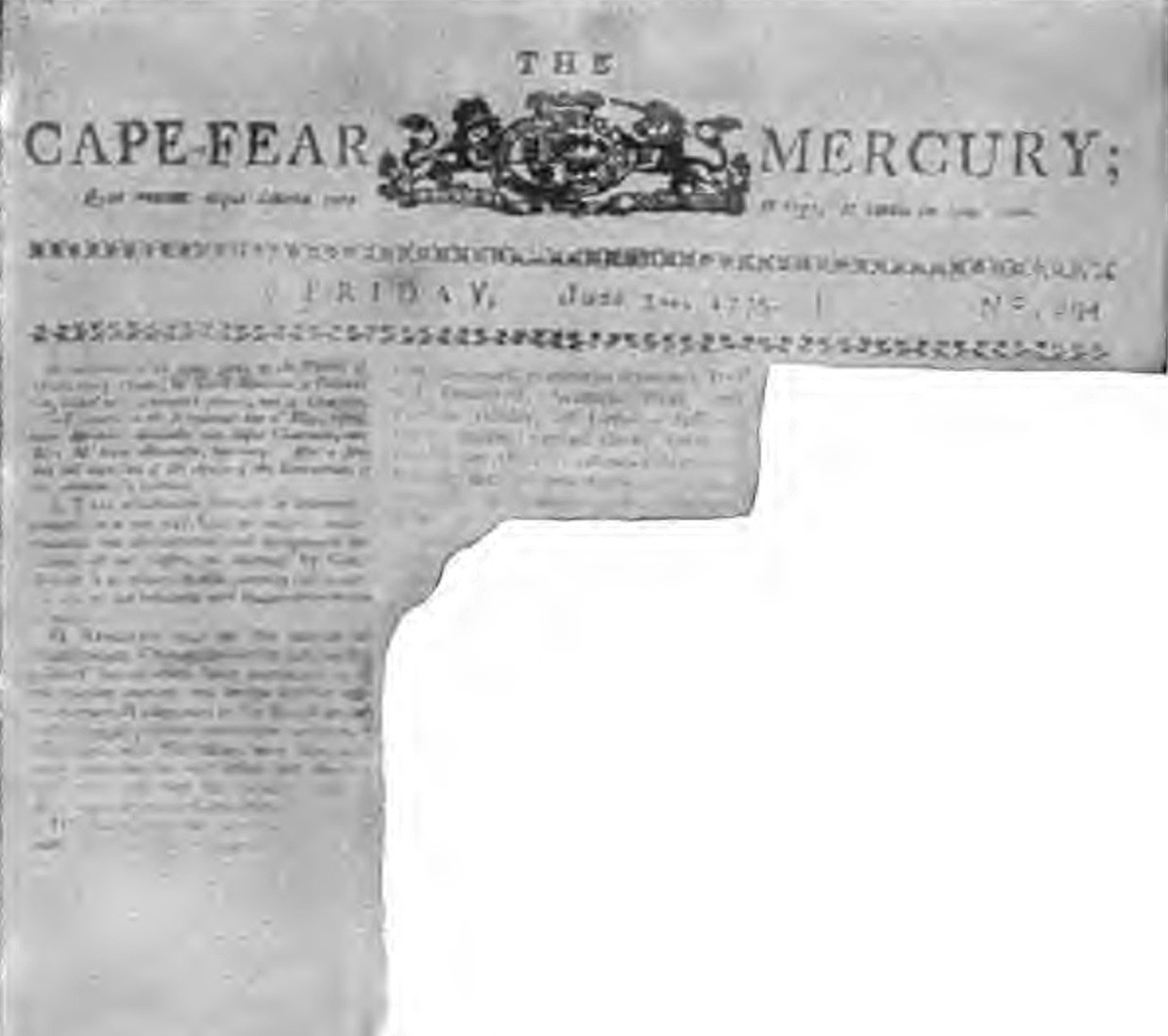
A fraudulent recreation of a page from the June 3, 1775, issue of the Cape Fear Mercury, which supposedly printed the text of the Mecklenburg Declaration of Independence. Published in Collier's Magazine in 1905, the reproduction was quickly shown to be a hoax.

In 1837, Jefferson's first biographer, George Tucker, came to Jefferson's defense. In The Life of Thomas Jefferson, Tucker argued that Jefferson's Declaration of Independence had been fraudulently interpolated into the Mecklenburg Declaration. North Carolina native Francis L. Hawks, a New York Anglican clergyman, responded that Jefferson had instead plagiarized the Mecklenburg Declaration. Hawks's position was apparently supported by the discovery of a proclamation by Josiah Martin, the last royal governor of North Carolina, which seemed to confirm the authenticity of the Mecklenburg Declaration. In August 1775, Governor Martin had written that he had:

seen a most infamous publication in the Cape Fear Mercury importing to be resolves of a set of people styling themselves a committee for the county of Mecklenburg, most traitorously declaring the entire dissolution of the laws, government, and constitution of this country, and setting up a system of rule and regulation repugnant to the laws and subversive of his majesty's government....

Here, at last, was contemporaneous confirmation that radical resolves had been adopted in Mecklenburg County in 1775. Unfortunately, the issue of the Cape Fear Mercury that Martin referred to could not be found. Throughout the 19th century, supporters of the Mecklenburg Declaration hoped that the missing paper would be discovered, proving their case. In 1905, Collier's Magazine published what was said to be a clipping from the missing issue, but advocates and opponents of the Mecklenburg Declaration agreed that the document was a hoax. It was later confirmed that the "traitorous" document referred to by Governor Martin was not the Mecklenburg Declaration of Independence, but was instead a radical set of resolutions known as the Mecklenburg Resolves.

== Discovery alters the debate ==
In 1838, the case for the authenticity of the Mecklenburg Declaration of Independence suffered a setback from which it has not recovered. That year, while examining newspapers published in 1775, archivist Peter Force discovered an abbreviated list of resolutions adopted in Mecklenburg County on May 31, 1775, that were different from the Mecklenburg Declaration of May 20. In 1847, the complete text of these Mecklenburg Resolves was found in a South Carolina newspaper published in June 1775. Unlike the Mecklenburg Declaration that had appeared in the Raleigh Register in 1819, the Mecklenburg Resolves fell short of an outright declaration of independence, and did not contain language that was parallel to Jefferson's 1776 Declaration of Independence. The Resolves, though comparatively radical, were similar to other local resolutions that were adopted in the colonies in 1774 and 1775.

The controversy over the Mecklenburg Declaration entered a new phase with the discovery of the Mecklenburg Resolves. The focus shifted from Thomas Jefferson to the question of how to account for two very different sets of resolutions supposedly adopted in Charlotte only eleven days apart. How was it possible that citizens of Mecklenburg County declared independence on May 20, and then met again on May 31 to pass less revolutionary resolutions? For skeptics of the Mecklenburg Declaration, the answer was that the Declaration was a misdated, inaccurate recreation of the authentic Resolves. Supporters of the Declaration maintained that both documents were genuine, and were adopted to serve different purposes.

=== Argument against ===
The argument that the Mecklenburg Declaration is a flawed version of the Mecklenburg Resolves was first made in 1853 by Charles Phillips, a professor at the University of North Carolina at Chapel Hill. In an influential article in the North Carolina University Magazine, Dr. Phillips concluded that John McKnitt Alexander had admitted to having reconstructed the text of the Mecklenburg Declaration from memory in 1800. In 1906, William Henry Hoyt published a scholarly work that many historians have regarded as the conclusive refutation of the Mecklenburg Declaration.

Hoyt's argument is briefly as follows: After the original documents relating to the Mecklenburg Resolves were destroyed by fire in 1800, John McKnitt Alexander attempted to recreate them from memory. Alexander made some rough notes, which still survive, and internal evidence indicates that these notes were written after the 1800 fire. Like some of his contemporaries, Alexander mistakenly remembered the radical Mecklenburg Resolves as being an actual declaration of independence. This misconception led Alexander, or perhaps another unknown writer, to borrow language from Jefferson's well-known Declaration of Independence when the Mecklenburg Declaration was written from Alexander's rough notes. The eleven-day discrepancy between the two sets of resolutions—May 20 and May 31—may result from some confusion of Old Style and New Style dates.

According to this argument, when the elderly eyewitnesses were interviewed after 1819, they naturally could not be expected to verify the wording of a document that they had heard read nearly fifty years earlier, nor remember the exact date of the public reading. The eyewitnesses were misled into accepting the text of the Mecklenburg Declaration as authentic because it had been published in 1819 with the claim that it was a true copy of the original resolutions. Because the actual resolutions had been radical, and British authority in Mecklenburg County had effectively ended in 1775, the eyewitnesses were able to believe that the Mecklenburg Resolves had been an outright declaration of independence. While they undoubtedly told the truth about the events of May 1775 as they remembered them, their testimony was given in response to leading questions, and their answers actually referred to the lost Mecklenburg Resolves. Unfortunately, by the time the authentic text of the Resolves had been rediscovered, all of the eyewitnesses were dead, and so no one could be asked to explain the existence of two different sets of resolutions.

=== Argument for ===
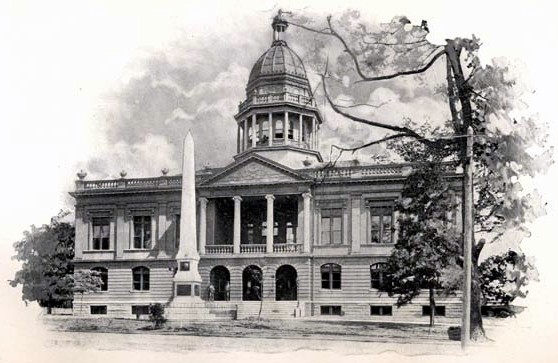
In 1898, this monument was erected in front of the Mecklenburg County Court House to honor the signers of the Mecklenburg Declaration. The building no longer exists, but the monument now stands behind another old court building.

Advocates of the Mecklenburg Declaration have argued that both the Declaration and the Resolves are authentic. This argument was developed in the 20th century by Professor Archibald Henderson of the University of North Carolina, who, beginning in 1916, wrote numerous articles on the subject. Henderson believed that the evidence showed that Mecklenburg County had adopted two sets of resolutions, that the text of the Mecklenburg Declaration was not recreated from memory, and that the events as described in Alexander's 1819 article were substantially correct. His work was supplemented in 1960 by journalist V. V. McNitt's book Chain of Error and the Mecklenburg Declarations of Independence.

One of the strongest pieces of nearly contemporaneous evidence in support of the Mecklenburg Declaration is a diary entry discovered in 1904. The entry is unsigned and undated, but internal evidence suggests that it was written in 1783 in Salem, North Carolina, by a merchant named Traugott Bagge. The English translation of the German entry reads:

I cannot leave unmentioned at the end of the 1775th year that already in the summer of this year, that is in May, June, or July, the County of Mecklenburg in North Carolina declared itself free and independent of England, and made such arrangements for the administration of the laws among themselves, as later the Continental Congress made for all. This Congress, however, considered these proceedings premature.

Skeptics of the Mecklenburg Declaration argued that the diary entry merely suggests that Bagge, writing eight years after the event, misinterpreted the Mecklenburg Resolves as having been an actual declaration of independence. Archibald Henderson, however, argued that the entry attested to both the Declaration ("declared itself free and independent") and the Resolves ("arrangements for the administration of the laws").

== Current status of the debate ==
The Mecklenburg Declaration of Independence no longer attracts much attention from professional historians, who generally regard the document as spurious. If the declaration is mentioned in scholarly works, it is usually to discount it. Professor William S. Powell, in his standard history North Carolina through Four Centuries (1989) relegates the Mecklenburg Declaration to a skeptical footnote; Professor H.G. Jones, in his North Carolina Illustrated (Chapel Hill: University of N.C. Press, 1983), pointedly places ironic quotation marks around the name of the declaration. The Harvard Guide to American History (1954) lists the Mecklenburg Declaration under the heading of "spurious declarations." Pulitzer Prize-winning historian Allan Nevins wrote in 1938 "Legends often become a point of faith. At one time the State of North Carolina made it compulsory for the public schools to teach that Mecklenburg County had adopted a Declaration of Independence on May 20, 1775—to teach what had been clearly demonstrated an untruth."

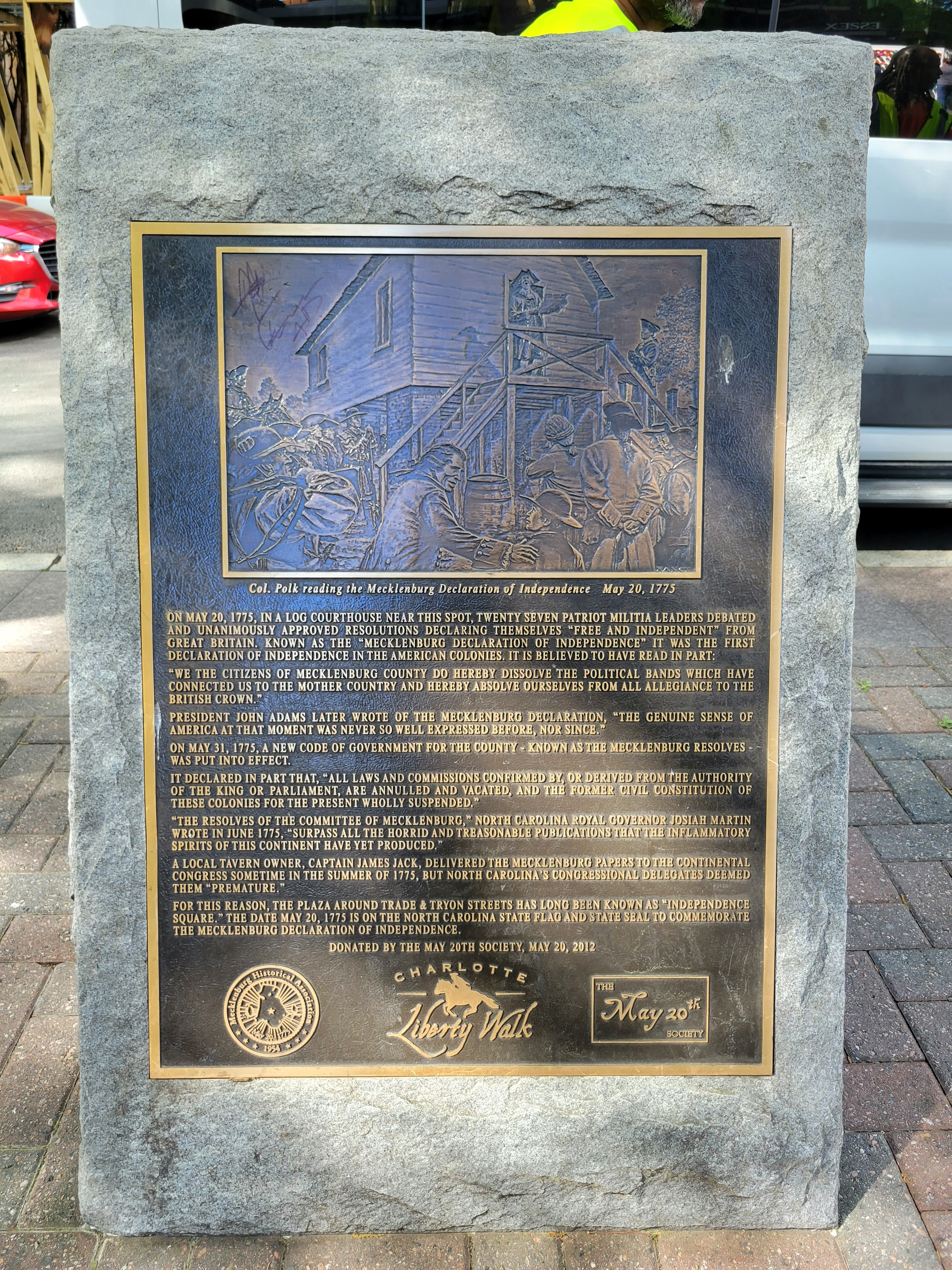
Commemorative plaque in Uptown Charlotte, North Carolina.

In 1997 historian Pauline Maier wrote:

When compared to other documents of the time, the "Mecklenburg Declaration of Independence" supposedly adopted on May 20, 1775, is simply incredible. It makes the reaction of North Carolinians to Lexington and Concord more extreme than that of the Massachusetts people who received the blow. The resolutions of May 31, 1775, of which there is contemporary evidence, were also radical, but remain believable.

Despite much scholarly opinion against the authenticity of the Mecklenburg Declaration, belief in the document remains important to some North Carolinians, says historian Dan L. Morrill, who notes that the possibility that it is genuine cannot be entirely discounted. Morrill writes, "Let's make one thing clear. One cannot demonstrate conclusively that the Mecklenburg Declaration of Independence is a fake. The dramatic events of May nineteenth and May twentieth could have happened. Ultimately, it is a matter of faith, not proof. You believe it or you don't believe it."

Initially in 1975–1979 and then starting again from 2015, North Carolina released a license plate with the words "First in Freedom" and the date of the Declaration of Independence preceded by the date of North Carolina's supposed declaration.

== Commemoration ==
The seal of North Carolina bears the date of the Mecklenburg Declaration.

The early government of North Carolina, convinced that the Mecklenburg Declaration was authentic, maintained that North Carolinians were the first Americans to declare independence from Britain. As a result, both the seal and the flag of North Carolina bear the date of the declaration. Coins have been minted that celebrate the Mecklenburg Declaration, and the story was printed in elementary school textbooks. A monument to the reputed signers of the declaration was unveiled in Charlotte on May 20, 1898, and a commemorative tablet was placed in the rotunda of the North Carolina State Capitol building on May 20, 1912. In 1881, the state legislature made May 20 a legal holiday to commemorate the Mecklenburg Declaration. Sometimes known as "Meck Dec Day", it is no longer an official holiday and does not attract the attention that it once did.

Four United States presidents visited Charlotte to participate in the Mecklenburg Day celebration: William Howard Taft (1909), Woodrow Wilson (1916), Dwight D. Eisenhower (1954), and Gerald Ford (1975). Aware of the controversy, the presidents generally praised the revolutionary patriots of Mecklenburg County without specifically endorsing the authenticity of the disputed document.

The Mecklenburg Declaration is referenced in the motto for Davidson College, located in Davidson in Mecklenburg and Iredell counties: Alenda Lux Ubi Orta Libertas ("Let Knowledge Be Cherished Where Liberty Has Arisen").

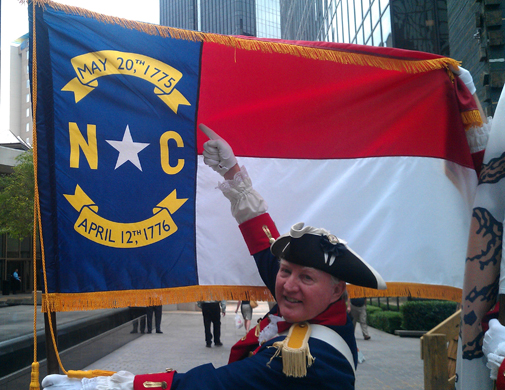
A Mecklenburg Declaration reenactor points to the May 20th, 1775 date on the North Carolina State Flag at the May 20, 2011 commemoration ceremony.

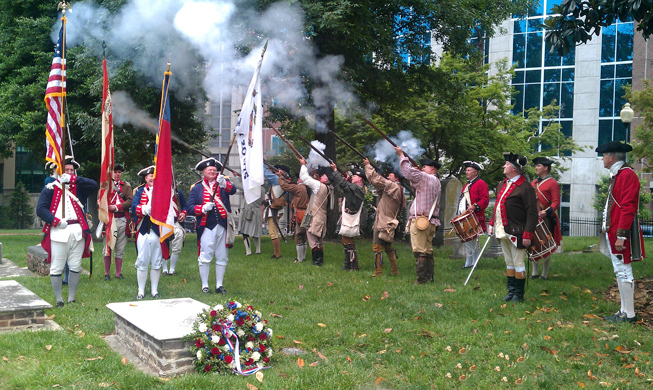
Reenactors fire a gun salute on May 20, 2011 after laying a wreath at the grave of General Thomas Polk, one of the reputed signers of the Mecklenburg Declaration

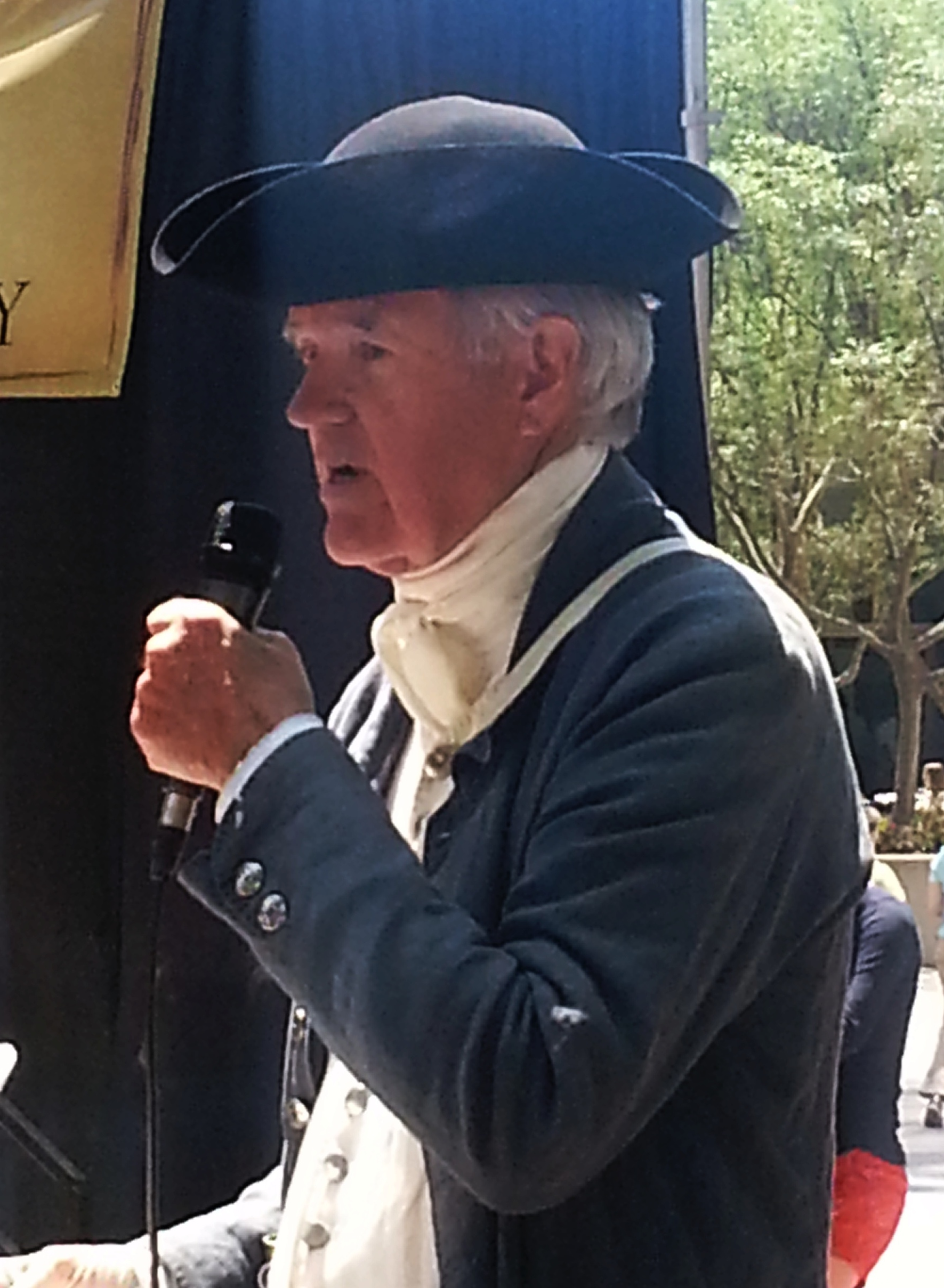
Reenactor Jim Williams portraying Thomas Polk at the 20 May 2014 Mecklenburg Declaration of Independence Commemoration at Founder's Square, Charlotte, North Carolina.

== See also ==
- Halifax Resolves
