= Seal of North Carolina =

Official government emblem of the U.S. state of North Carolina

The Great Seal of North Carolina

Versions
- Variant
- Armiger: State of North Carolina
- Adopted: 1794 (232 years ago)
- Motto: Latin: Esse quam videri, lit. 'To be rather than to seem'
- Earlier version(s): 1779–1794, the State of North Carolina; 1730–1776, the Province of North Carolina

The Great Seal of North Carolina is used to authenticate certain official documents issued by the government of North Carolina. The great seal depicts Libertas and Abundantia. It was adopted in 1794, standardized in 1971, and modified in 1983.

== Design ==
According to the Act of 1971, as amended in 1983, the Great Seal of the State is defined as such:

The Governor shall procure of the state a seal, which shall be called the Great Seal of the State of North Carolina, and shall be two and one-quarter inches in diameter, and its design shall be a representation of the figures of Liberty and Plenty, looking toward each other, but not more than half-fronting each other and other-wise disposed as follows: Liberty, the first figure, standing, her pole with a cap on it in her left hand and a scroll with the word "Constitution" inscribed thereon in her right hand. Plenty, the second figure, sitting down, her right arm half extended toward Liberty, three heads of grain in her right hand, and in her left, the small end of her horn, the mouth of which is resting at her feet, and the contents of the horn rolling out.

The background on the seal shall contain a depiction of mountains running from the left to the right to the middle of the seal. A side view of a three-masted ship shall be located on the ocean and to the right of Plenty. The date "May 20, 1775" shall appear within the seal and across the top of the seal and the words "Esse quam videri" shall appear at the bottom around the perimeter. No other words, figures or other embellishments shall appear on the seal.

== History ==
=== Carolinian seals ===
When the Province of Carolina was chartered as a English colony in 1663, the Lords Proprietors of the Province of Carolina adopted a double-sided seal. The obverse side depicts a crest with two crossed cornucopias on a shield flanked by two Indians with a deer atop a knight's helmet above the shield. The reverse side depicts the cross of England surrounded by the arms of the Lords Proprietors of the Province of Carolina.

When the County of Albemarle was organized within the Province of Carolina in 1665, it adopted the reverse side of the provincial seal as its official county seal. The Government of Albemarle modified the provincial seal by adding the word "A-L-BE-M-A-R-L-E" to the outside edge of the seal.

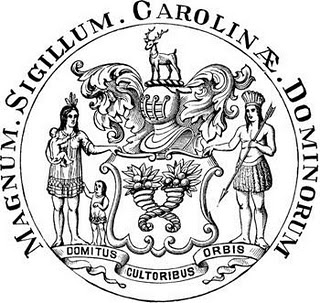
Great Seal of the Province of Carolina (obverse)

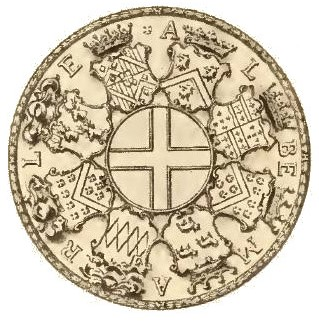
Seal of the County of Albemarle, Carolina and de facto seal of the Province of North Carolina until 1730

=== Provincial seals ===
When the Province of Carolina was partitioned into two different colonies, the Northern part was left without a seal. On February 3, 1730; the Board of Trade recommended to the King of Great Britain that he order for the creation of a seal for the North Carolina Colony. Later that same month, the King of Great Britain would approve of a seal design. The obverse depicts the coastline of North Carolina. To the left is King George II on his throne with two women facing him. The first woman, representing liberty, is holding a liberty pole with a Phrygian cap. The second woman, representing prosperity, is holding a cornucopia. To the right is a ship sailing towards the coastline. The bottom of the seal has the phrase "QUÆ SERA TAMEN RESPEXIT", meaning "which though late, looked upon me". The reverse side of the seal depicts the Coat of arms of the United Kingdom.

In 1767, it was updated when the seated figure was changed to be King George III, the woman representing liberty was relocated behind the king, and the woman with the cornucopia was placed in a kneeling position. The reverse was updated to reflect the redesigned arms of Great Britain.

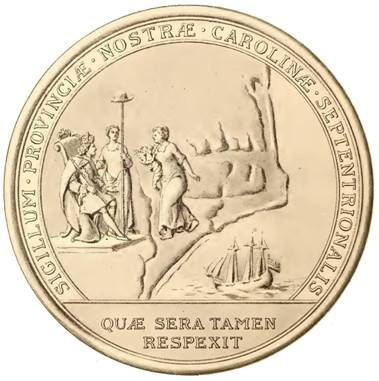
Seal of the Province of North Carolina (1730 design, obverse)

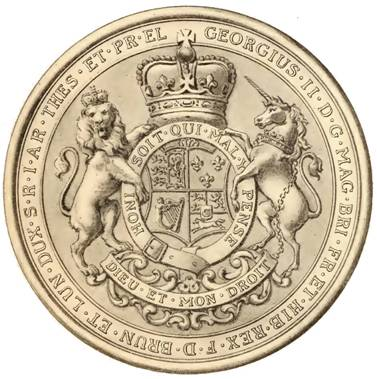
Seal of the Province of North Carolina (1730 design, reverse)

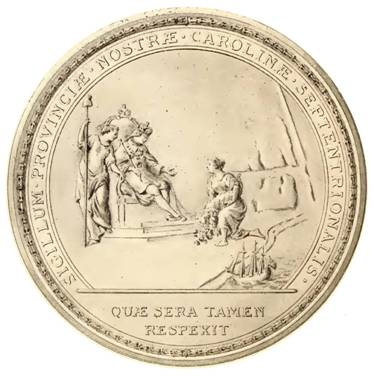
Seal of the Province of North Carolina (1767 design, obverse)

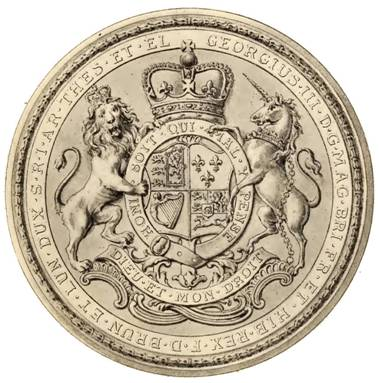
Seal of the Province of North Carolina (1767 design, reverse)

=== Great Seal ===
The Great Seal of the State of North Carolina was adopted in 1779. Prior to its adoption, William Hooper, Joseph Hewes, and Thomas Burke were assigned to commission a seal. In 1778, William Tisdale, a silversmith, began work on the seal. The governor of North Carolina used a private seal until the official state seal was finished. The obverse side of the seal depicts a woman wearing a Roman helmet holding a stick with a Phrygian cap. In her other hand is a paper that has CONSTITUTION inscribed on it. Below the woman is the phrase "IN LEGIBUS SALUS", meaning "in laws there is safety". The seal's reverse side depicts a woman herding cattle. Below the woman is inscribed "INDEPENDENCE MDCCLXXVI".

The 1793 design was authorized by the General Assembly in January 1792. It was further modified in 1971 after the Chief Deputy Attorney General discovered there was more than one version then in use. In 1983, state senator Julian R. Allsbrook proposed adding "April 12, 1776" onto the Great Seal, the date of the Halifax Resolves. This proposal was approved by the General Assembly and is the design presently in use.

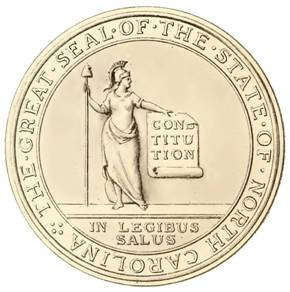
Great Seal of North Carolina (1779 design, obverse)

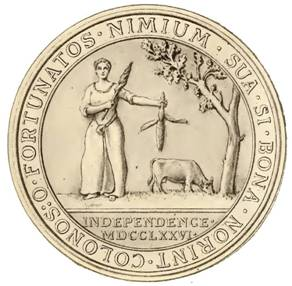
Great Seal of North Carolina (1779 design, reverse)

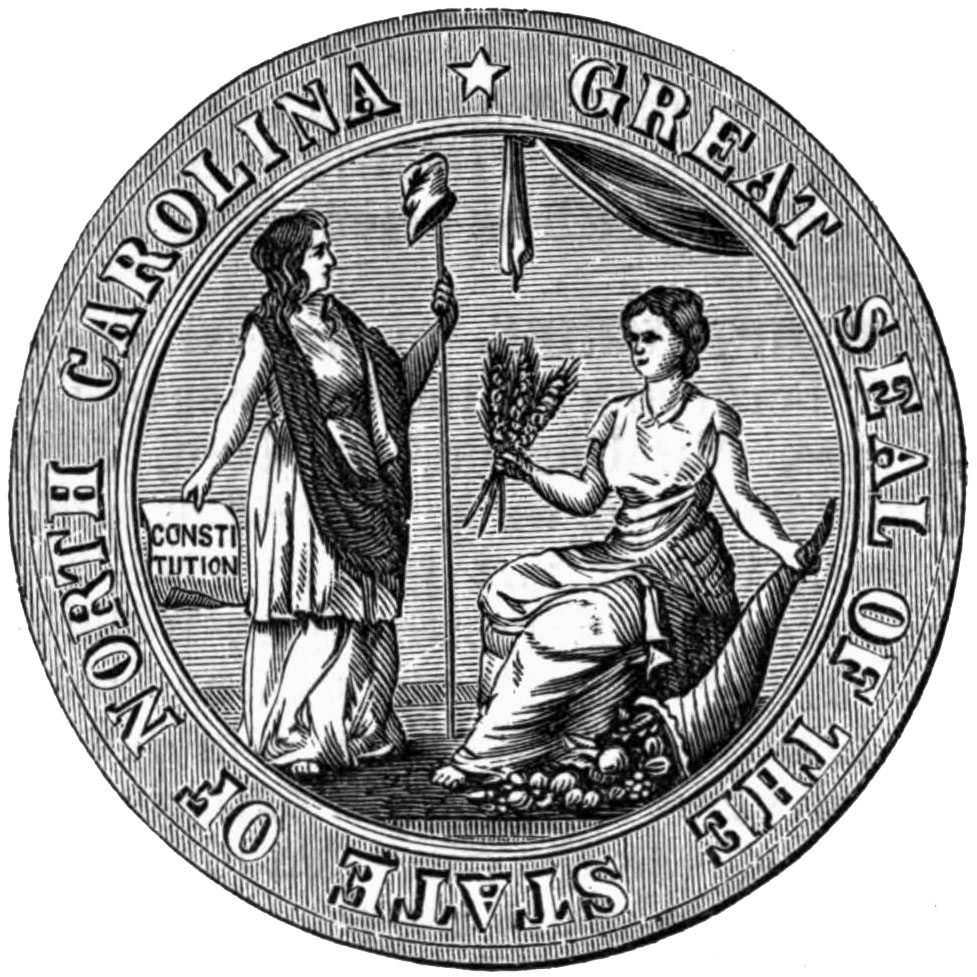
Great Seal of North Carolina (1836 design)

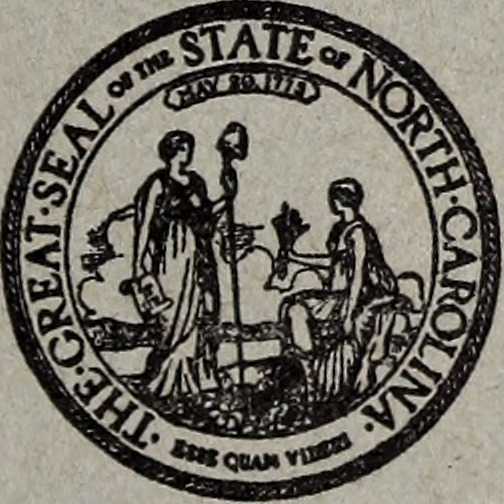
Great Seal of North Carolina (1893 design)

Great Seal of North Carolina (1971 design)

Great Seal of North Carolina (1983 design)

== State seals ==
Seal of the Office of the Governor of North Carolina

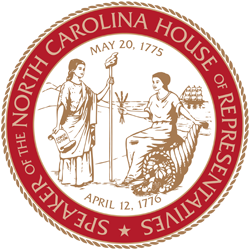
Seal of the Speaker of the North Carolina House of Representatives

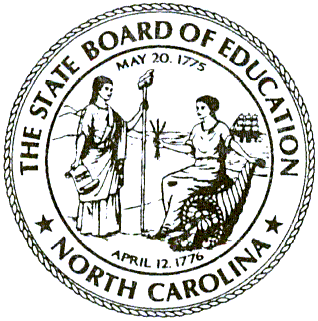
Seal of the North Carolina State Board of Education

Seal of the North Carolina Department of Correction

Seal of the North Carolina Department of Transportation

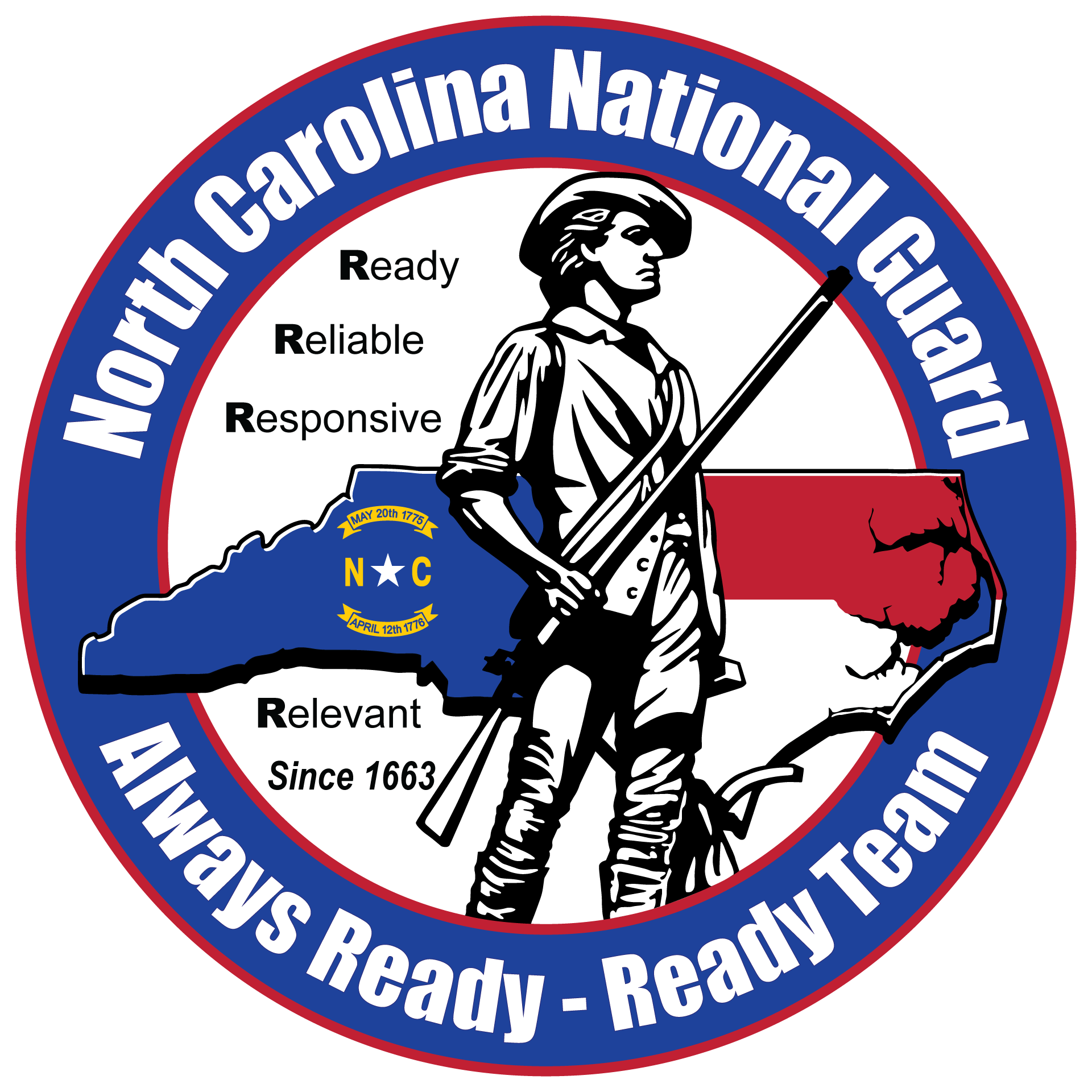
Seal of the North Carolina National Guard

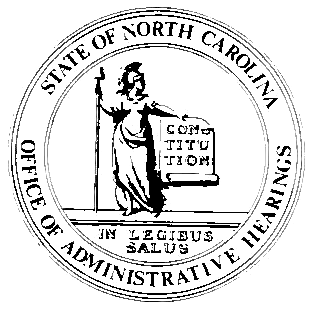
Seal of the North Carolina Office of Administrative Hearings

== See also ==
- Flag of North Carolina
- List of North Carolina state symbols
