= Greene Washington Caldwell =

American politician (1806–1864)

G.W. Caldwell

Member of the U.S. House of Representatives from North Carolina's 11th district
- In office March 4, 1841 – March 3, 1843
- Preceded by: Henry William Connor
- Succeeded by: District inactive

Personal details
- Born: Greene Washington Caldwell; April 13, 1806 Belmont, North Carolina, U.S.
- Died: July 10, 1864 (aged 58) Charlotte, North Carolina, U.S.
- Resting place: Old Settlers' Cemetery, Charlotte, North Carolina, U.S.
- Party: Democratic
- Education: Medical Department of University of Pennsylvania
- Occupation: Politician, lawyer, physician

Military service
- Allegiance: United States
- Branch/service: United States Army
- Battles/wars: Mexican–American War

Greene Washington Caldwell (April 13, 1806 – July 10, 1864) was a U.S. representative from North Carolina. He was born in Belmont, North Carolina in 1806.

== Education and career ==
In 1831, Greene Washington Caldwell graduated from the Medical Department of University of Pennsylvania. The following year, he served for several months as an assistant surgeon in the United States Army before deciding to leave the medical field to study law. After studying law, he was admitted to the bar and practiced in Charlotte, North Carolina.

=== Politics ===
Caldwell began his career representing North Carolinians in 1836 when he was elected to the North Carolina House of Commons. Caldwell stayed in this deleted position until 1841 when he was elected to the 27th U.S. Congress as a member of the Democratic Party. Caldwell remained a representative until 1843, serving a single term. He was not a candidate for renomination. The following year in 1844, Caldwell was appointed as Superintendent of the United States Mint in Charlotte.

=== Mexican-American War ===
Caldwell's government service was interrupted by the Mexican-American War where he served as a commissioned captain of the Third Dragoons on April 9, 1847. He was mustered out the following year on July 20, 1848.

=== Return to politics ===
Caldwell returned to political life and was elected to the North Carolina Senate in 1849. Two of his lieutenants, Davidson and Harrison, were also elected to the House of Commons. Caldwell was unsuccessful in a bid for Congress in 1851 and resumed his medical practice in Charlotte.

== Death ==
Caldwell died in Charlotte, North Carolina, on July 10, 1864, and was buried in Old Settlers' Cemetery in Charlotte.

U.S. House of Representatives
| Preceded by Henry W. Connor | Member of the U.S. House of Representatives from North Carolina's 11th congressional district 1841–1843 | Succeeded by District inactive |
