= Old Settlers' Cemetery (Charlotte, North Carolina) =

Historic municipal burial ground

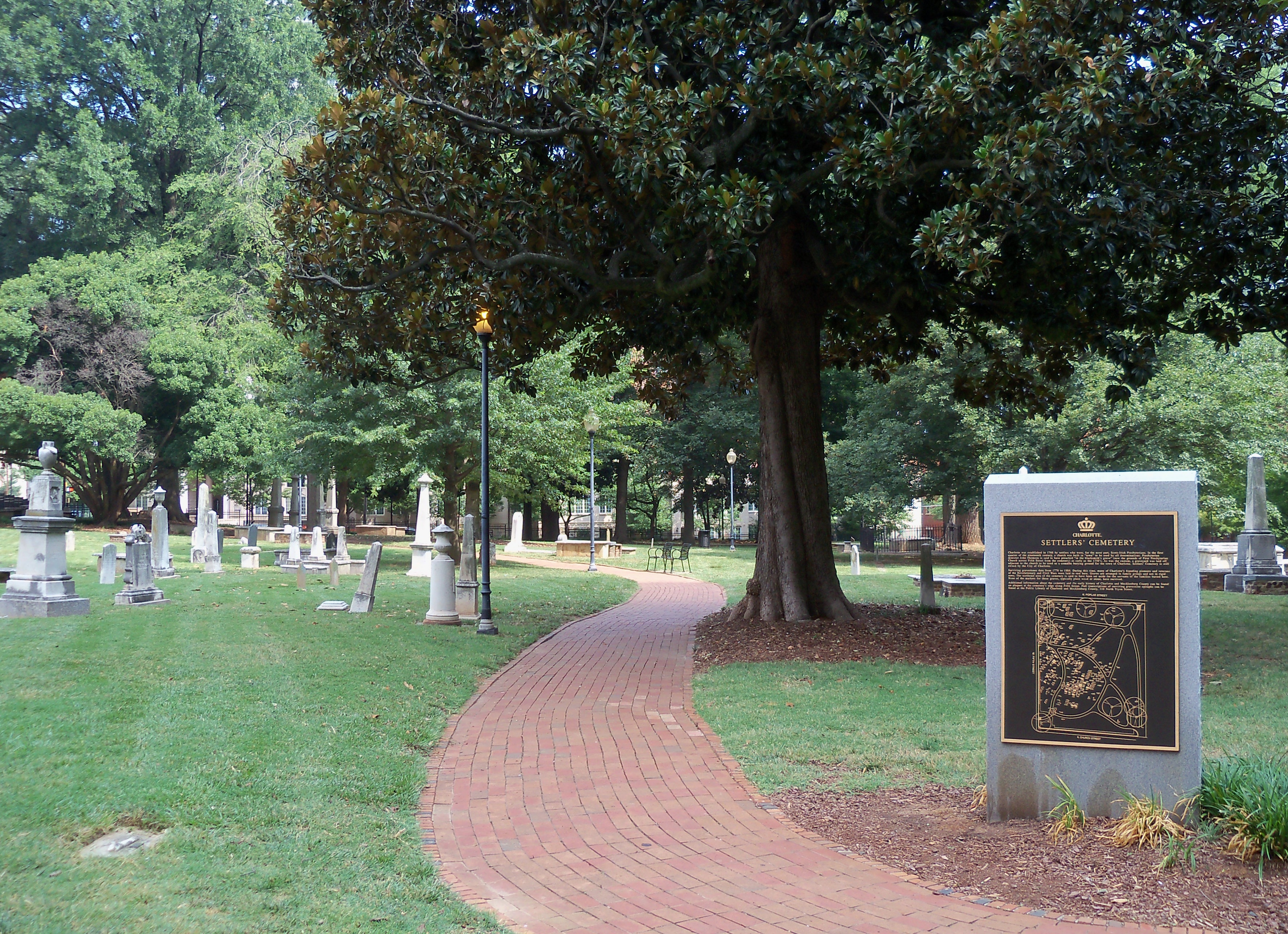
- Old Settlers' Cemetery, main entrance
- Interactive map of Old Settlers' Cemetery
- Type: former city cemetery
- Location: Charlotte, North Carolina
- Coordinates: 35.2296°N 80.8431°W
- Area: 1.6 acres (0.65 ha)
- Operator: City of Charlotte

Old Settlers' Cemetery is a city-owned cemetery located at 200 West 5th Street, right in the middle of Charlotte, North Carolina. It was the first municipal burial ground in Charlotte and contains the graves of many early settlers, with gravesites dating from 1776 through 1884. Prominent people buried in Old Settlers' include Nathaniel Alexander, Greene Washington Caldwell, and Thomas Polk, Charlotte founding father and great-uncle of United States President James K. Polk. Also contained in the cemetery is an obelisk honoring North Carolina planter and politician William Davidson.

Old Settlers' was Charlotte's only city operated cemetery until 1854, when—due to space limitations—it was closed, and the City opened Elmwood/Pinewood Cemetery. By the 1940s the cemetery was in poor condition and was only preserved through the efforts of Charlotte historian and legislator Julia McGehee Alexander.

Old Settlers' Cemetery recently had a $500,000 restoration. With its majestic old oaks and brick lined pathways, it is more park than cemetery and is a centerpiece of Charlotte's Fourth Ward Historic District.
