= William Davidson (North Carolina politician) =

American politician (1778–1857)

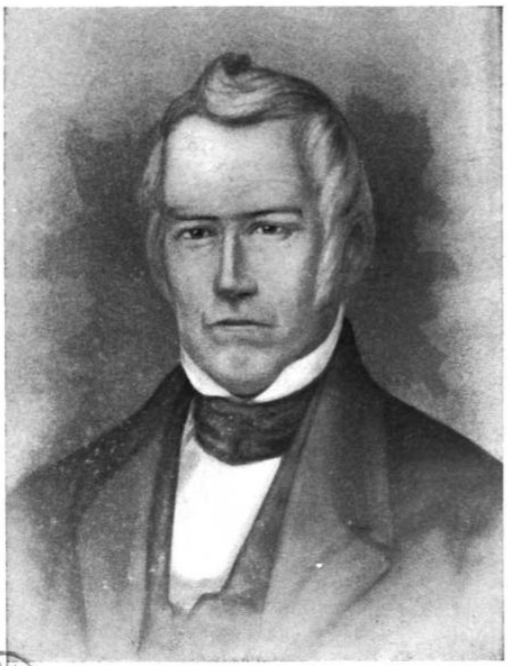

Member of the U.S. House of Representatives from North Carolina's 11th district
- In office December 2, 1818 – March 3, 1821
- Preceded by: Daniel Munroe Forney
- Succeeded by: Henry William Connor

Member of the North Carolina Senate
- In office 1813; 1815; 1819; 1825; 1827–1830

Personal details
- Born: September 12, 1778 Charleston, South Carolina, U.S.
- Died: September 16, 1857 (aged 79) Charlotte, North Carolina, U.S.
- Resting place: Old Settlers' Cemetery, Charlotte, North Carolina, U.S.
- Party: Federalist
- Children: Sarah Frew Davidson
- Occupation: Politician

William Davidson (September 12, 1778 – September 16, 1857) was a U.S. representative from North Carolina.

Born in Charleston, South Carolina, Davidson completed preparatory studies. He moved with his parents to North Carolina in early youth and settled in Mecklenburg County. He was the father of Sarah Frew Davidson.

Davidson owned a plantation. He served as member of the state senate in 1813 from 1815 to 1819, and 1825. He moved to Charlotte, North Carolina, in 1820.

Davidson was elected as a Federalist to the Fifteenth Congress to fill the vacancy caused by the resignation of Daniel M. Forney. He was reelected to the Sixteenth Congress and served from December 2, 1818, to March 3, 1821. He was an unsuccessful candidate for reelection in 1820 to the Seventeenth Congress.

Davidson was again elected a member of the state senate and served from 1827 to 1830. He resumed his business pursuits. He died in Charlotte, North Carolina, on September 16, 1857, and is interred in Old Settlers' Cemetery in that city.

== Sources ==
- United States Congress. "William Davidson (id: D000087)". Biographical Directory of the United States Congress.

U.S. House of Representatives
Preceded by Daniel M. Forney	Member of the U.S. House of Representatives from North Carolina's 11th congressional district 1818–1821	Succeeded by Henry W. Connor
