= Sarah Frew Davidson =

- Born: July 20, 1804; Mecklenburg County, North Carolina
- Died: March 2, 1889 (aged 84); Charlotte, Mecklenburg County, North Carolina
- Resting place: Elmwood Cemetery, Charlotte, Mecklenburg County, North Carolina
- Parent(s): William Davidson and Sarah Frew Davidson

Sarah Frew Davidson (July 20, 1804 – March 2, 1889) was an educator in nineteenth-century Charlotte, North Carolina, United States. Her teaching of music was much praised. She kept a journal about life on the plantation where she lived.

== Biography ==
Sarah was born to William Davidson, North Carolina state senator and United States congressman, and Sarah Davidson in 1804. Her siblings were Margaret A. Davidson, Harriet Elizabeth Davidson, and William Archibald Frew Davidson. Davidson was active as a music teacher in the Charlotte Mecklenburg area during her later years. According to a local history, Davidson "taught music for a number of years, and gave such satisfaction that she held a high place as a teacher of music in the opinions of eminent people."

== Personal journal ==
Davidson's 1837 journal is held by the Atkins Library at the University of North Carolina at Charlotte. A transcribed and annotated version of the journal has been compiled by volunteers at the Historic Rosedale Plantation and was published in 2005. The journal includes information about the rural plantation on which Sarah lived, the slaves her father owned, the small village of Charlotte, and the religious climate of the 1830s in North Carolina, among other topics.
