= Henry William Connor =

American politician (1793–1866)

Henry William Connor (1793–1866) was a U.S. representative from North Carolina; born near Amelia Courthouse, Prince George County, Virginia, August 5, 1793. He graduated from South Carolina College (now the University of South Carolina) at Columbia in 1812. He served as aide-de-camp to Brig. Gen. Joseph Graham with rank of Major in the expedition against the Muscogee in 1814. After he war he settled in Falls Town, North Carolina where he became a plantation owner. He was elected as a Democratic-Republican to the Seventeenth Congress; elected as a Jackson Republican to the Eighteenth Congress; elected as a Jacksonian to the Nineteenth through the Twenty-fourth Congresses, and elected as a Democrat to the Twenty-fifth and Twenty-sixth Congresses (March 4, 1821 – March 3, 1841); chairman, Committee on the Post Office and Post Roads (Twenty-second through Twenty-fifth Congresses); was not a candidate for renomination in 1840; member of the State senate 1848–1850; died at Beatties Ford, North Carolina, January 6, 1866; interment in Rehobeth Methodist Church Cemetery, near Sherrills Ford, North Carolina

== See also ==
- Seventeenth United States Congress
- Eighteenth United States Congress
- Nineteenth United States Congress
- Twentieth United States Congress
- Twenty-first United States Congress
- Twenty-second United States Congress
- Twenty-third United States Congress
- Twenty-fourth United States Congress
- Twenty-fifth United States Congress
- Twenty-sixth United States Congress
- Entry in US Congress Biographical database

U.S. House of Representatives
Preceded by William Davidson	Member of the U.S. House of Representatives from North Carolina's 11th congressional district 1821–1841	Succeeded by Greene W. Caldwell
