= Flag of North Carolina =

U.S. state flag

North Carolina
- Use: Civil and state flag
- Proportion: 2:3
- Adopted: March 9, 1885; 141 years ago (modified June 24, 1991)
- Design: A blue union, containing in the center thereof a white star with the letter "N" in gilt on the left and the letter "C" in gilt on the right of said star, the circle containing the same to be one-third the width of the union.
- Designed by: William G. Browne; Johnston Jones

The flag of the state of North Carolina, often referred to as the North Carolina flag, N.C. flag, or North Star, is the state flag of the U.S. state of North Carolina.

== Statute ==
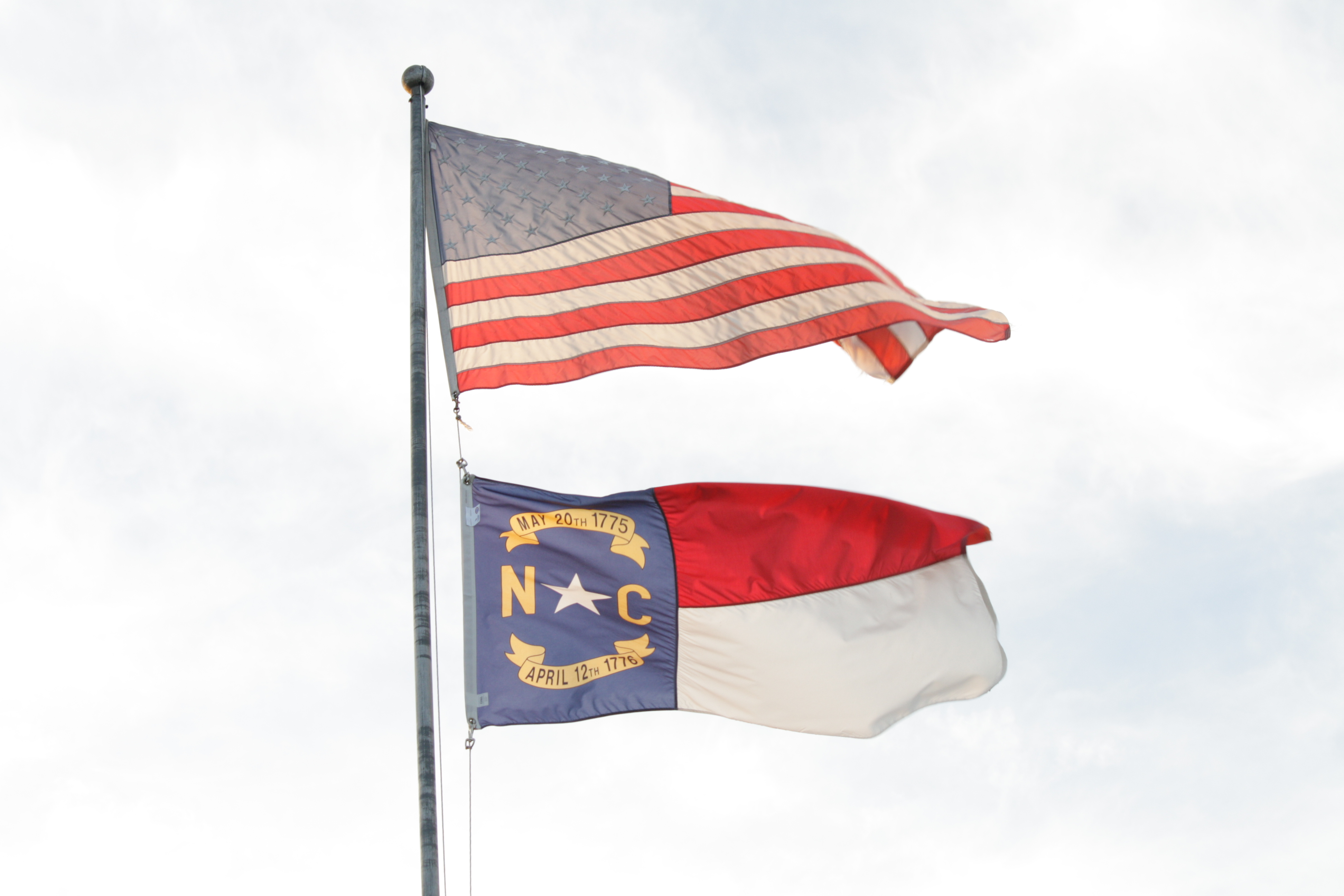
An American flag above a North Carolina flag

The 2024 North Carolina General Statutes, Chapter 144, § 144-1, defines the state flag as follows:

...a blue union, containing in the center thereof a white star with the letter "N" in gilt on the left and the letter "C" in gilt on the right of said star, the circle containing the same to be one third the width of said union. The fly of the flag shall consist of two equally proportioned bars, the upper bar to be red, the lower bar to be white; the length of the bars horizontally shall be equal to the perpendicular length of the union, and the total length of the flag shall be one half more than its width. Above the star in the center of the union there shall be a gilt scroll in semicircular form, containing in black letters this inscription: "May 20th 1775" and below the star there shall be a similar scroll containing in black letters the inscription: "April 12th 1776".

== Symbolism ==
The flag bears the dates of the Mecklenburg Declaration of Independence (May 20, 1775) and of the Halifax Resolves (April 12, 1776), documents that place North Carolina at the forefront of the American independence movement. Both dates also appear on the seal of North Carolina.

== History ==
=== First flag (1861–1865) ===
State flag (1861–1865)

North Carolina did not have an official state flag until the North Carolinian state constitutional convention of 1861. During this convention, delegates voted to join the Confederacy. They established a committee to come up with a flag. This flag was ratified by the convention on June 22, 1861. The flag consisted of a red field with a white star in the center. Inscribed above the star was the date May 20, 1775, the controversial date of the Mecklenburg Declaration of Independence. Inscribed below the star in a semi-circular form was the date May 20, 1861, which was the date North Carolina declared it had seceded from the Union. The flag also contained two horizontal bars of equal width, one in blue and one in white. The design is similar to one suggested by Raleigh artist William G. Browne.

During the American Civil War, secessionist leaders spoke of the Mecklenburg Declaration with reverence, attempting to connect it with the state's joining the Confederacy. Confederate leader Jefferson Davis spoke to a Charlotte crowd in September 1864, saying "people of this section were the first to defy British authority and declare themselves free" encouraging them to continue backing the Confederacy's civil war effort.

In 1880, The Raleigh papers ask Governor Jarvis for a state flag to be displayed at the Battle of Kings Mountain Centennial in South Carolina.

=== Current flag (1885–present) ===
==== Flag statute of 1885 ====
State flag before modification (1885–1991)

A former Confederate soldier and adjutant general of North Carolina (1877–1888), Johnston Jones, introduced the bill which led the state legislature to adopt a new flag in March 1885, to replace the flag that had been adopted on June 22, 1861. The red field of the old flag was replaced by a blue field. This was the first and only flag formally representing the State of North Carolina as a part of the United States.

The flag of the state of North Carolina was adopted by statute of the North Carolina General Assembly in 1885 and was defined as follows:

That the flag of North Carolina shall consist of a blue union, containing in the center thereof a white star with the letter "N" in gilt on the left and the letter "C" in gilt on the right of said star, the circle containing the same to be one-third the width of the union. The fly of the flag shall consist of two equally proportioned bars; the upper bar to be red, the lower bar to be white; that the length of the bars horizontally shall be equal to the perpendicular length of the union, and the total length of the flag shall be one-third more than its width. That above the star in the center of the union there shall be a gilt scroll in semi-circular form, containing in black letters this inscription "May 20th 1775," and that below the star there shall be a similar scroll containing in black letters the inscription: "April 12th 1776".

During the Spanish-American War the state organized the 1st North Carolina Regiment, which carried the state flag.

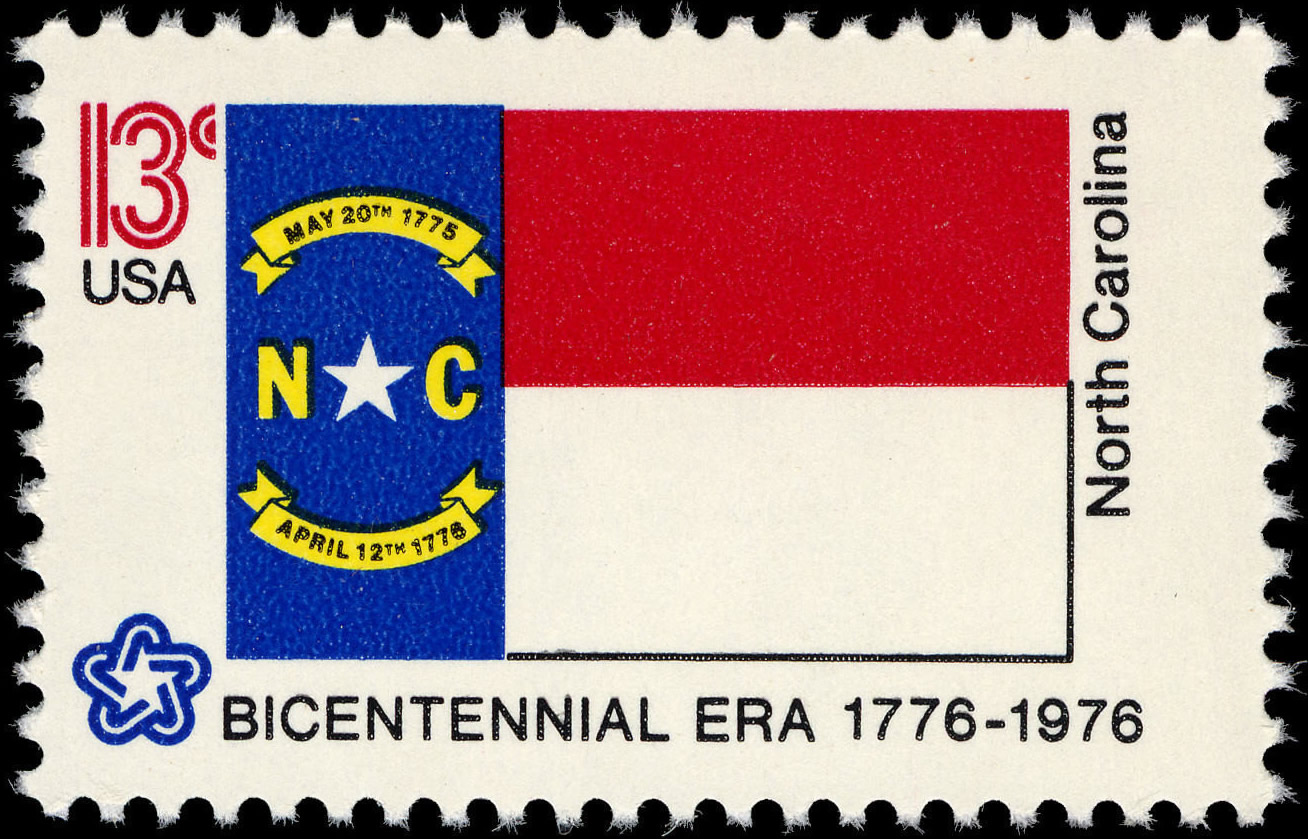
The North Carolina state flag as depicted in the 1976 bicentennial postage stamp series.

==== Flag modification of 1991 ====
On June 24, 1991, a bill was passed by the North Carolina Senate that changed the official proportions of the state flag. It changed from "… the total length of the flag shall be one-third more than its width" as written in the 1885 act to "… the total length of the flag shall be one-half more than its width."

=== Proposed flags ===
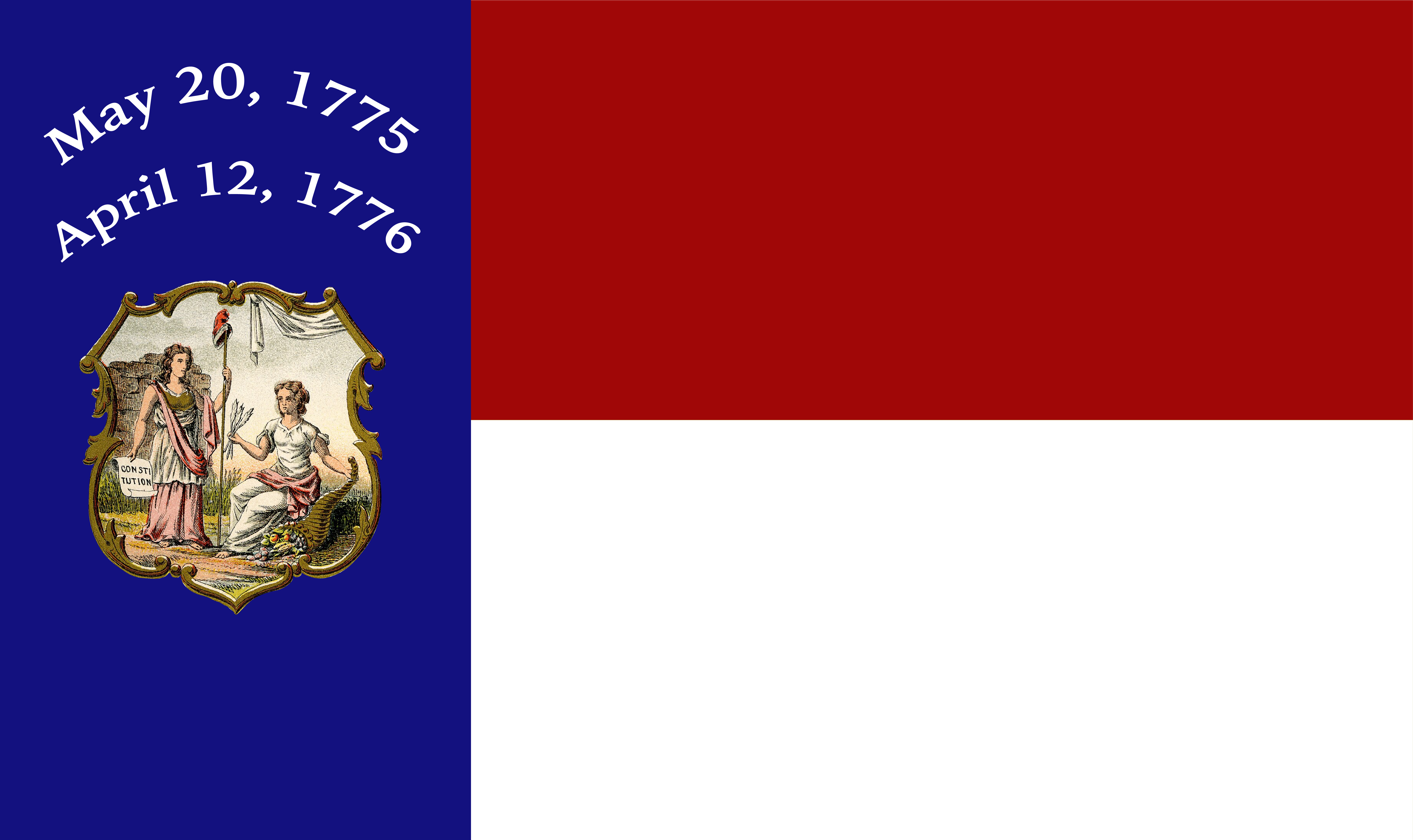
A state flag proposal, per description

According to Fairfield Weekly Journal, an earlier state flag was adopted by the state House of Representatives. The design was described as:

A white bar and a red bar run horizontally, the red bar is above the white. Near the staff the color is blue to a depth of one-third of the flag. In the center of this blue portion is the coat of arms of the state in gold.

— Fairfield Weekly Journal, April 9th, 1885

In 1893, a bill was introduced to replaced the star with the state seal, as the star was not seen as a symbol of the state.

In 1902, Senator Glenn proposed to remove the star and "N. C." and replaced them with the coat of arms of the state.

In 1908, Professor Robertson proposed that the flag should have 2 stars with the new date "May 26, 1908"

=== Other flags ===
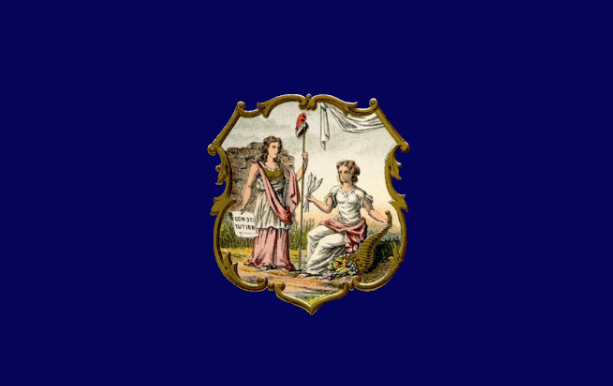
The Coat of Arms of North Carolina centered on a blue field.

Before the state flag was adopted in 1885 many unofficial flags were used, most had a blue field with the state's coat of arms in the middle.

A blue flag with the inscription "All hail North Carolina," in white was raised in Lexington in 1840.

In 1845, the state legislature approved funds to the Governor too purchased the American flag, also a state flag described as bearing the state's coat of arms.

In 1847, the state organized the 1st North Carolina Infantry Volunteers for the Mexican-American War. In February the state legislature bought a flag for the regiment. It was an American flag with no stars instead the canton bore the state coat of arms while the backside contain the national coat of arms.

During the 1856 Whig National Convention, state delegates carried with them a white banner with an eagle and the state's coat of arms in the middle with the words "Rip Van Winkle Wide Awake."

In 1872, a flag bearing the words "North Carolina" was displayed in a political rally in Alexandria, Virginia.

On May 25, 1881 Governor Jarvis procured a National flag and a state flag. It was flown over the state house during the state's 160th anniversary. It design is not known.

In 1884, at the Messrs. Alfred Williams & Eugene Harrell office in Raleigh there was a state flag displayed. It had a blue field with the state's coat of arms in the middle.

In August of 1885, Governor Scales' flag was raised in over R. A. Shotwell funeral. It was described as having a blue field with the state coat of arms in the middle.

In 1892, Lieutenant Cramer of the state's Naval Militia received a Naval Battalion flag. It was 5 feet (1.5m) wide and 6 feet (1.8 m) long, the field was navy blue and in the center was the state's coat of arms. Above the arms was two red scrolls with the top one saying "1st Battalion," in gold, and the bottom one "Naval Artillery." On the left side of state's arms are the letters "N. C." and to the right is "S. G" In each corner of the banner is their insignia, two crossed cannons with and anchor in the middle. The whole thing costed $80 ($3,560 adjusted for inflation) and was made in Columbus, Ohio.

In 1893, a banner containing the state's coat of arms was displayed Carroll institute in Washington D.C.

In 1901, a large memorial was held in Henderson for President Mckinley ten days after he was shot. In the city hall was a stage an on it was portrait of the man flanked by the American flag and state flag with a blue field bearing the coat of arms of the state. The flags belonging to the Vance Guards militia.

In 1905, Governor Glenn was given his own flag. It was described as being the same as the state flag but with inscription: "General Headquarters, State of North Carolina," across the red and white bars in gold

In 1920, a unique state flag was flown bearing the words: "States Rights Defense League." The banner was raised to protest the new state laws about flag desecration.

== Salute to the flag ==
The General Assembly of North Carolina adopted an official salute to the flag in 2007. It reads:

I salute the flag of North Carolina and pledge to the Old North State love, loyalty, and faith.
