= Mecklenburg County Regiment =

American colonial regiment

- Active: 1775-1783
- Allegiance: North Carolina
- Branch: North Carolina militia
- Type: Militia
- Role: Infantry
- Part of: Brigade
- Engagements: see Salisbury District Brigade

Commanders
- Notable commanders: Col. Thomas Polk; Col. Adam Alexander; Col. George Alexander; Col. William Lee Davidson; Col. Robert Irwin; Col. Caleb Phifer

The Mecklenburg County Regiment was authorized on May 31, 1775 by the Province of North Carolina Congress. From November 7, 1779 until the 3rd Quarter of 1780, it was called the 1st Mecklenburg County Regiment when a 2nd Mecklenburg County Regiment existed. The 1st Mecklenburg County regiment was engaged in 39 known battles and skirmishes against the British during the American Revolution in North Carolina, South Carolina and Georgia between 1776 and 1781. It was active until the end of the war.

== Officers ==
The Mecklenburg County Regiments (both 1st and 2nd) were under the command of Salisbury District Brigade and General Griffith Rutherford when it was established on May 4, 1776 through the end of the war. Officers of the Mecklenburg County Regiment included:

Colonels:

- Colonel Thomas Polk (1775, original officer)
- Colonel Adam Alexander (1775, Lt. Col.; 1776-1778, Colonel)
- Colonel George Alexander (1776-1778, Major; 1778-1780, Colonel)
- Colonel William Lee Davidson (early 1780)
- Colonel Robert Irwin (1775, 1776-1777, Captain; 1777-1778, Lt. Col; 1778-1783, Colonel)
- Colonel Caleb Phifer (1775, 1776-1778, Captain; 1778-1779, Lt. Col; 1779-1780, 2nd, Colonel; 1780-1783, Colonel)

Miscellaneous staff:

- James R. Alexander, Surgeon
- William Lemmond, Clerk and Surgeon
- Thomas Grier, Commissary
- John Huggins, Wagon Master
- James Maxwell, Quartermaster
- Andrew Walker, Quartermaster

Other notable officers:

- Lt. Col. William Polk (also Major)
- Major James Rutherford (also Captain, son of General Griffith Rutherford)
- Captain James Knox (Presidential ancestor of James K. Polk)
- Captain John Polk
- Captain Charles Polk

== Engagements ==
The Mecklenburg County regiment was active from its original authorization until the end of the war. It was subordinated to the Salisbury District Brigade under Brigadier General Griffith Rutherford.

The Mecklenburg County regiment was involved in 39 known battles, sieges, and skirmishes in North Carolina, South Carolina, and Georgia. See Salisbury Districgt Brigade Engagements for a complete, chronological list of engagements.

== 2nd Mecklenburg County Regiment ==
When the North Carolina General Assembly of 1779 approved the creation of a 2nd Mecklenburg County Regiment on November 7. 1779, the name of the original regiment became the 1st Mecklenburg County Regiment. Colonel Caleb Phifer became the commander of the 2nd Mecklenburg County Regiment. The 2nd Mecklenburg County Regiment was short lived and it was disbanded in the third quarter of 1780, about the time of the Battle of Camden.

== Polk's regiment of light dragoons ==
In September 1780, Lt. Col. William Polk of the Mecklenburg County Regiment was authorized to create a regiment of Light Dragoons, which was subordinated to the Mecklenburg County Regiment. On April 1, 1781, this regiment of light dragoons was placed under Brig. Gen. Thomas Sumter's South Carolina State Troops.

== Independent corps of light horse ==
The Independent Corps of Light Horse was established in June of 1780, mostly from men in the Mecklenburg County Regiment. The unit was commanded by Major William Richardson Davie. The unit saw some action at Hanging Rock, South Carolina in June 1780. The unit arrived too late for the fighting at the Battle of Ramseur's Mill. It was disbanded in August 1780.

== See also ==
- List of American Revolutionary War battles
- Mecklenburg Resolves
- Salisbury District Brigade
- Southern Campaigns: Pension Transactions for a description of the transcription effort by Will Graves
- Southern theater of the American Revolutionary War

== Bibliography ==
- "Mecklenburg Militia"., Facebook page for Revolutionary war reenacting unit that represents the Mecklenburg Militia from the Hopewell area of Mecklenburg county North Carolina
