= Robert Irwin (North Carolina politician) =

Early American politician

Colonel Robert Irwin (August 26, 1738-December 23, 1800) of Steele Creek Township, Mecklenburg County, North Carolina was a long term North Carolina State Senator. The first state senator ever elected from Mecklenburg County, he served as the North Carolina senator from Mecklenburg County in the years 1778-1783, and again, in the years 1787 and 1795, and, finally, from 1797 to 1800, dying in office.

Prior to entering the senate, Irwin commanded the Mecklenburg County Regiment of the Salisbury District, North Carolina militia, rising to the rank of a colonel and commandant of the 1st Mecklenburg County Regiment (Est. 1775, split into 1st & 2nd regiments 1780, and disestablished in 1783). He commanded the regiment while fighting strategically against Loyalists militia forces beside South Carolina patriot militia General Thomas Sumter at the Battle of Rocky Mount. Later, the two again fought to victory together against loyalist provisional units and militia (while heavily outnumbered) at the Battle of Hanging Rock. Irwin is reported (Note: See Mecklenburg Declaration of Independence#Signers for a discussion of who is reported to have signed this document. There is no copy of the document and recollections were only compiled in 1819) to have been a signer of the Mecklenburg Declaration of Independence. Colonel Irwin was of the Presbyterian faith.

== Revolutionary War service ==
Robert Irwin held several positions in the North Carolina militia during the American Revolutionary War:

- Captain in the Mecklenburg County Regiment of the North Carolina militia (1775, 1776-1777)
- Captain in the 2nd Salisbury District Minutemen (1775-1776)
- Lt. colonel in the Mecklenburg County Regiment of the North Carolina militia (1777-1778)
- Colonel in the Mecklenburg County Regiment of the North Carolina militia (1778-1783)

== See also ==
- Battle of Hanging Rock Historic Site
