= Thomas Polk =

Revolutionary War officer and politician

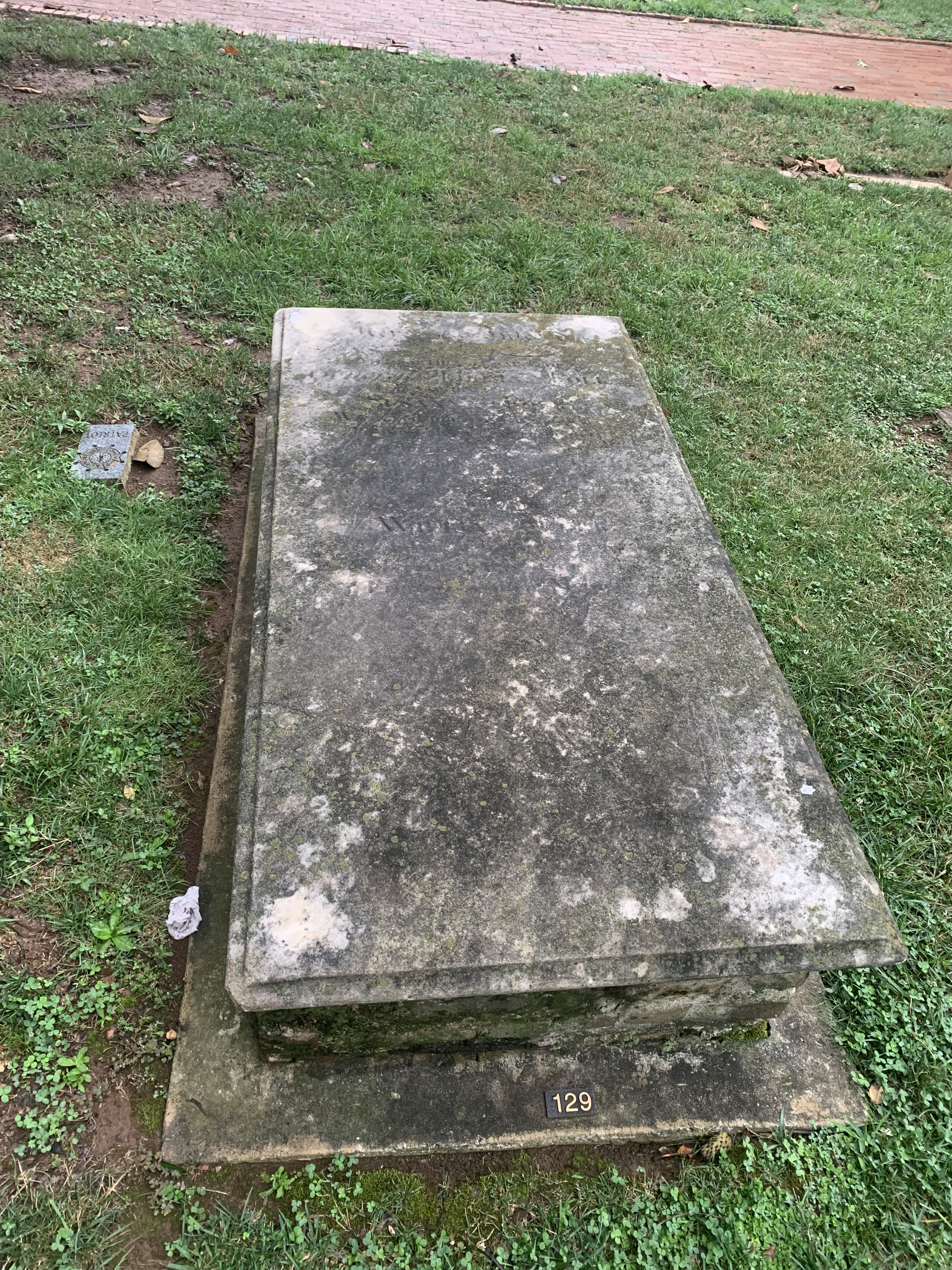
- Grave of Thomas Polk in Old Settlers' Cemetery
- Born: 1732; Cumberland County, Pennsylvania, British America
- Died: 1794 (aged 61–62); Charlotte, North Carolina, U.S.
- Burial place: Old Settlers' Cemetery, Charlotte, North Carolina; 35.2296°N 80.8431°W
- Spouse: Susanna Spratt
- Relatives: James K. Polk (Great-nephew); William Polk (son)
- Military career
- Allegiance: Kingdom of Great Britain; Continental Congress; United States of America
- Branch: North Carolina militia Continental Army
- Service years: 1775–1778, 1780–1781
- Rank: Colonel
- Unit: Commissary General for the North Carolina Line
- Commands: Mecklenburg County Regiment, 2nd Salisbury District Minuteman Battalion, 4th North Carolina Regiment
- Conflicts: War of the Regulation; American Revolutionary War: Snow Campaign; Battle of Brandywine

Thomas Polk (c. 1732 – January 25, 1794) was a planter, military officer in the Continental Army during the American Revolutionary War from 1775 to 1781, and a politician who served in the North Carolina House of Commons, North Carolina Provincial Congress, and Council of State. Polk commanded the 4th North Carolina Regiment in the Battle of Brandywine. In 1786, Polk was elected by the North Carolina General Assembly to the Congress of the Confederation, but did not attend any of its sessions. Polk was a great-uncle of the 11th President of the United States, James K. Polk.

== Early life and War of the Regulation ==
Polk was born in Cumberland County, Province of Pennsylvania around 1732 to William and Margaret Taylor Polk. His father was of Scotch-Irish descent, and had been born in the Province of Maryland. In 1753, Polk moved to Anson County, North Carolina. In 1755, he married Susanna Spratt, with whom he would have eight children, including William Polk. In 1765, Polk participated in the War of Sugar Creek, in which local settlers took up arms against large private landholders who were speculating on real estate in the area of what is now Charlotte. During that conflict, speculator Henry McCulloh attempted to have a large tract of land that had been granted to him by the Crown surveyed and subdivided. The settlers in Anson County objected, as McCulloh sought to interfere with what they considered their established rights in the land.

During the confrontation into the settlers and the land agents, McCulloh attempted to evict Polk from his home. Polk and his supporters intimidated McCulloh's land officers and surveyors to the point that McCulloh allowed the rights to a portion of his lands to revert to the Crown by 1767. The settlers were not, however, ultimately successful, and many, including Polk himself, purchased land from McCulloh or were otherwise bribed into cooperation. Polk was also given a position as a commissioner for the new town of Charlotte due to McCulloh's influence, and served as McCulloh's land agent in the newly created Mecklenburg County. Charlotte had been founded at the crossroad of a small trail with the Indian Trading Path near where that great thoroughfare entered the lands occupied by the Catawba people. Polk's homeplace sat near the center of that community.

Polk served in the North Carolina House of Commons from 1766 to 1771. During the War of the Regulation, Polk was appointed a captain of militia by Governor William Tryon as part of the governor's strategy to recruit prominent Presbyterians to his side against the Regulators, many of whom had backgrounds in Presbyterian congregations. Polk's position as an assemblyman allowed him to take advantage of financial rewards after the defeat of the Regulator movement. In 1772, Polk surveyed the border between North and South Carolina.

== American Revolutionary War ==
Polk was among the residents and officials of Mecklenburg County who drafted and adopted the Mecklenburg Resolves on May 31, 1775, which called for a reorganization of colonial government and declared laws enforced by the Crown null and void. Polk was then elected a member of the Third North Carolina Provincial Congress, which established a government in the absence of Royal Governor Josiah Martin. In late 1775 Polk participated as a colonel of Patriot militia in the Snow Campaign, which sought to suppress Loyalist recruiting in the South Carolina Upcountry.

Polk was then appointed colonel of the 4th North Carolina Regiment of Continental Line and marched north in early 1777. Polk and his unit fought at the Battle of Brandywine and wintered at Valley Forge with General Washington's main army. In September 1777, with British forces about to occupy Philadelphia, Polk was assigned to escort a baggage train containing the city's bells, including the Liberty Bell, from Philadelphia to safety in Allentown.

By February 1778 Polk returned to North Carolina to recruit more soldiers for the Continental Army, but by June 26 he had resigned his commission, aggrieved at being passed over for promotion to brigadier general after the death of General Francis Nash. He lost his command of the 4th North Carolina Regiment when, in a reduction of forces, it was combined with the 2nd North Carolina Regiment. In mid–1780 Polk again accepted a commission with the Continental Army, this time serving as commissary general of purchases for both the state of North Carolina and the Continental Army in the southern theater. When Nathanael Greene assumed command of the Continental Army in the southern theater, he met with Polk for an extended time on the general's first night in the army's camp in order to become familiar with the region's resources.

Polk also acted as commissary for the Salisbury district, one of North Carolina's militia recruiting divisions, often using his personal assets and credit to provide supplies for the Patriot cause. When controversy arose over the propriety of his practices in obtaining supplies and credit, he again resigned, but continued to work with General Greene, who appointed him a brigadier general in early 1781. The North Carolina General Assembly refused to approve the commission and appointed him a "colonel commandant" instead. Polk declined the appointment, citing his age and family responsibilities.

Summary of service record:

- Colonel over the Mecklenburg County Regiment of the North Carolina militia (1775)
- Colonel over the 2nd Battalion of Salisbury District Minutemen, North Carolina State troops (1775–1776)
- Colonel over the 4th North Carolina Regiment, Continental Line (1776–1778)
- Commissary General for the North Carolina Line (1780)

== Political life after the Revolution ==
In 1783 and 1784, Polk was elected to the North Carolina Council of State, which assisted the governors in performing their executive duties. In 1786, the General Assembly elected Polk as a delegate to the Third Continental Congress, by that time known as the Congress of the Confederation, but Polk did not attend any of that body's sessions. Polk's home accommodated President George Washington overnight during his 1791 tour of the southern states.

== Death and legacy ==
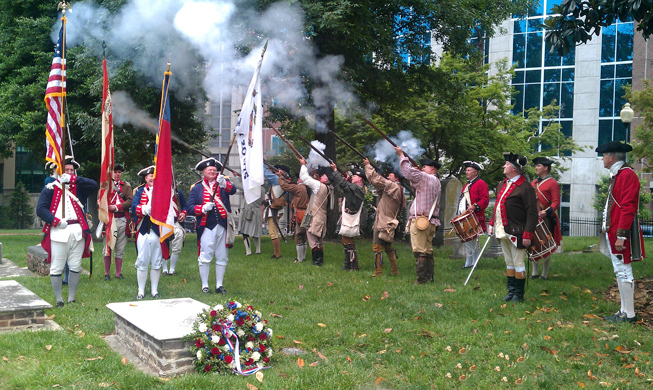
Mecklenburg Declaration reenactors firing a gun salute after laying a wreath at the grave of Thomas Polk on May 20, 2011

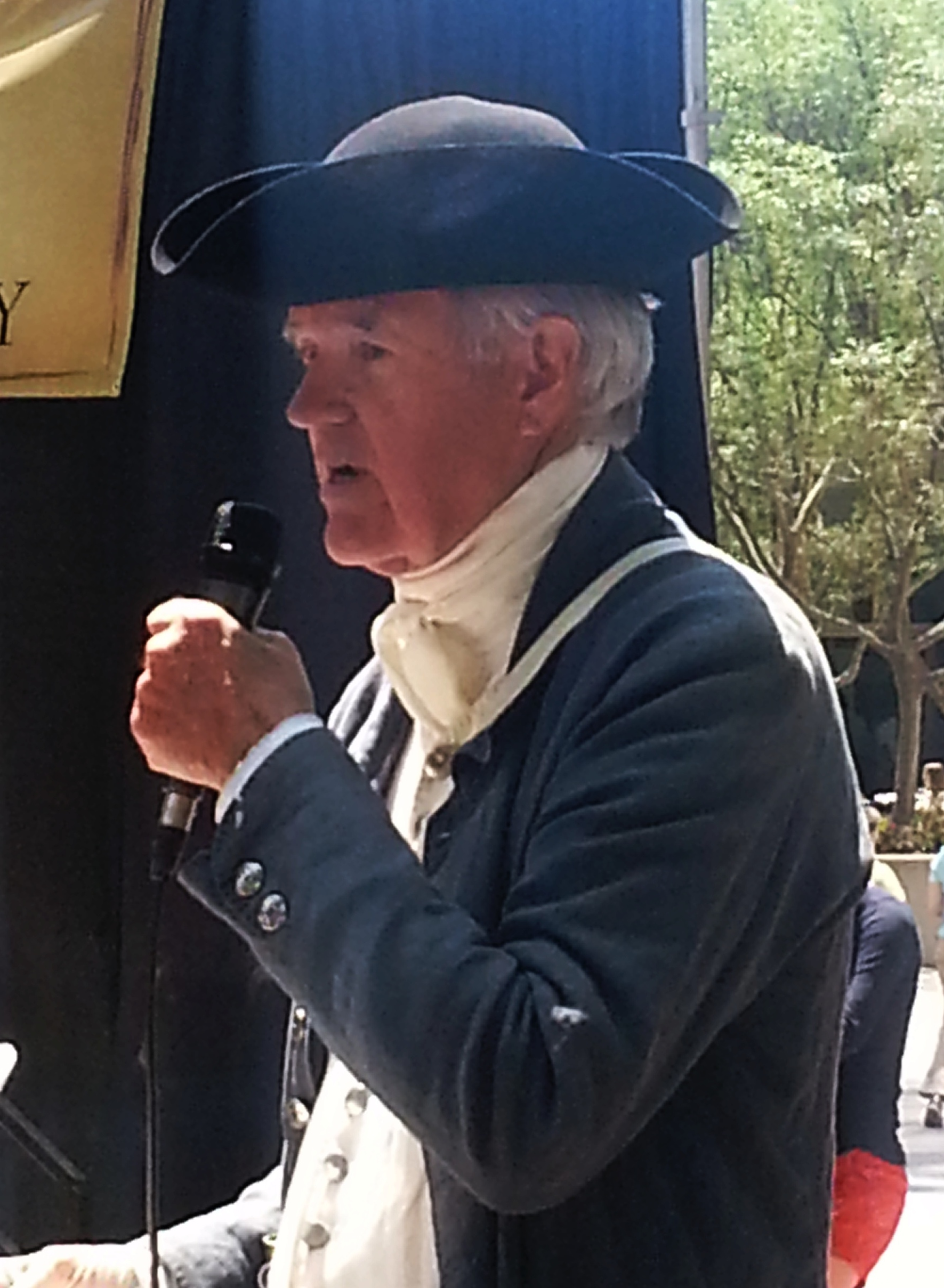
Reenactor Jim Williams portraying Thomas Polk at the 20 May 2014 Mecklenburg Declaration of Independence Commemoration at Founder's Square, Charlotte, North Carolina

Polk died at his Charlotte home on January 25, 1794, and was buried in what is now known as the Old Settlers' Cemetery in Charlotte.

=== Notable relatives ===
- Polk was a nephew of David Reese of the Mecklenburg Declaration of Independence
- Polk was a great-uncle of the 11th President of the United States, James K. Polk.
- Polk's son William Polk was also an officer during the American Revolution and would go on to be prominent citizen of the state. Polk County, North Carolina is named for him.
- Polk's brother Ezekiel Polk was also a soldier during the Revolution. He was the grandfather of James. K. Polk.
- Polk's grandson Leonidas Polk (son of William) was an Episcopal Bishop and a Confederate General During the American Civil War. Until 2023, Fort Johnson in Louisiana was named Fort Polk for Leonidas.
