= Mecklenburg Resolves =

List of statements adopted at Charlotte, in Mecklenburg County, North Carolina

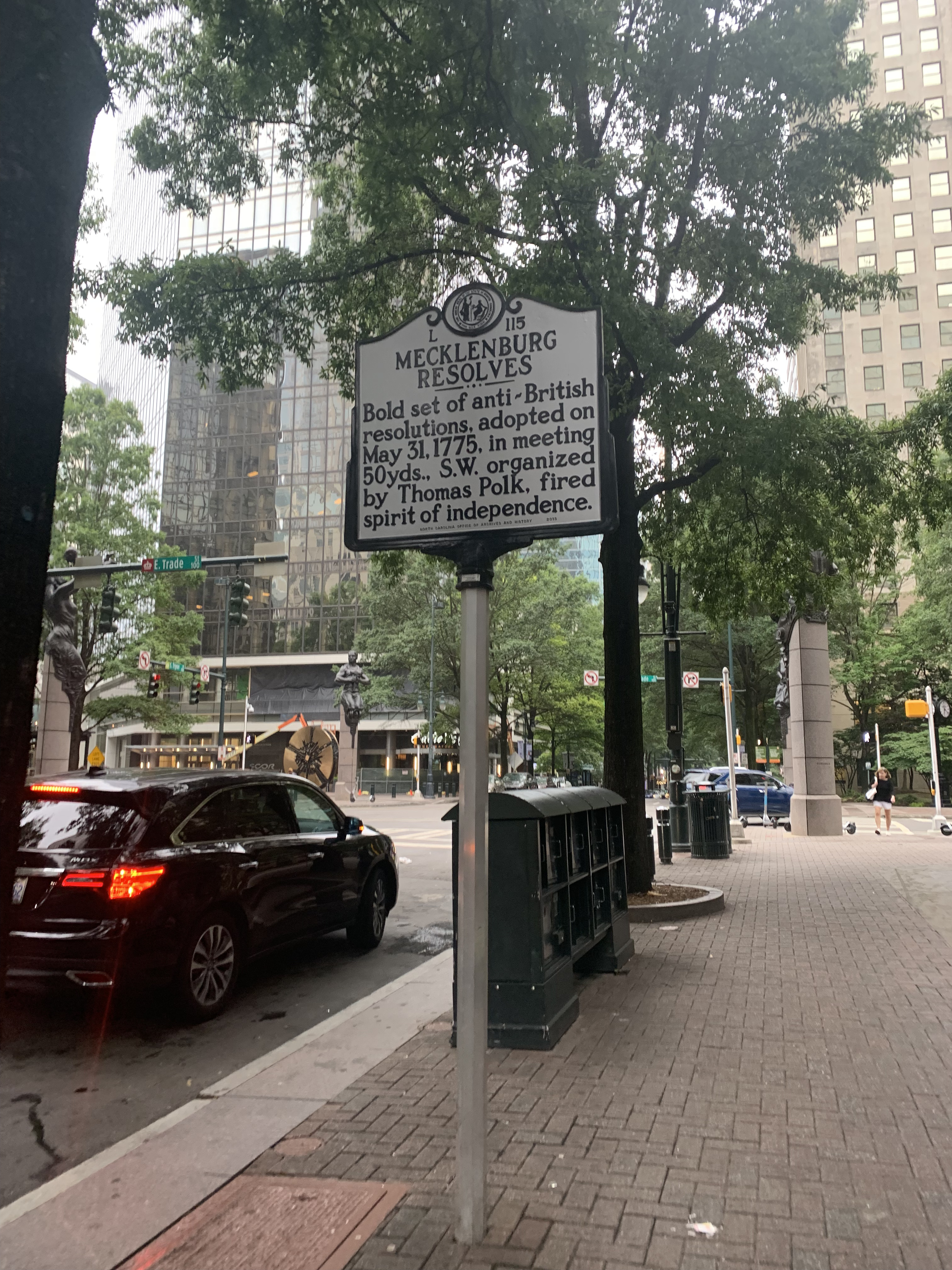
Plaque commemorating the Mecklenburg Resolves located in Charlotte, North Carolina

The Mecklenburg Resolves, or Charlotte Town Resolves, were a list of statements adopted at Charlotte, in Mecklenburg County, North Carolina on May 31, 1775; drafted in the month following the fighting at Lexington and Concord. Similar lists of resolves were issued by other local colonial governments at that time, none of which called for independence from Great Britain. The Mecklenburg Resolves are thought to be the basis for the unproven "Mecklenburg Declaration of Independence". While not a declaration, the Resolves annulled and vacated all laws originating from the authority of the King or Parliament, and ended recognition of the Crown's power in the colony of North Carolina and all other American colonies. It became the first colony to formally do so, taking place about a year before the Halifax Resolves were passed by the Fourth North Carolina Provincial Congress.

== Creating the "Resolves" ==
The Mecklenburg Resolves document was created by the Mecklenburg County Committee of Safety on or after May 20, 1775, and adopted by that same committee on May 31, 1775. This was just weeks after what is now considered the first battles in the American Revolutionary War at Lexington and Concord, Massachusetts.

The Resolves proclaimed that "all Laws...derived from the Authority of the King or Parliament, are annulled and vacated," and that the Provincial government "under the Great Continental Congress is invested with all legislative and executive Powers...and that no other Legislative or Executive does or can exist, at this time, in any of these Colonies."

Captain James Jack is reputed to have relayed the Resolves document to the North Carolina delegation made up of Richard Caswell, William Hooper, and Joseph Hewes meeting at the Continental Congress. There, the delegates received it but decided not to present it at that time to the Congress as a whole. These resolves were drafted only a month following the outbreak of civil unrest at Lexington and Concord. Similar lists of resolves were issued by other localities at the time and throughout the next 14 months (such as the Tryon Resolves in the neighboring Tryon County). None of these actually called for independence.

=== Intent ===
The Mecklenburg Resolves left the door open to reconciliation if Parliament were to "resign its unjust and arbitrary Pretentions [sic] with respect to America", in which case the resolutions would no longer be in force. Although a display of defiance, the Mecklenburg Resolves were not, by any means, a declaration that the people of Mecklenburg County were free and independent of The Crown.

== Reported loss ==
The original ratified document of the "Mecklenburg Resolves" (or alleged "Mecklenburg Declaration") was said to have burned in an 1800 fire at a private residence where it was being kept. (Note: Six additional official copies of the document that the state was keeping in storage along with the original version of The Resolves also reportedly burned along with the originals.) There are no independently published contemporaneous accounts of the wording of the document.

=== Signatories ===
There are no published contemporaneous accounts of who signed the Mecklenburg Resolves.

== Resolves text found ==
Proof that the Mecklenburg Resolves existed was found in 1838. The case for the authenticity of the Mecklenburg Resolves, but not a declaration of independence was bolstered with the discovery by historian Peter Force of an abbreviated list of resolutions that were adopted in Mecklenburg County on May 31, 1775. These differed widely from the purported text of the declaration of May 20. Then, in 1847, the complete text of The Resolves was found in the archives of the South Carolina Gazette. The newspaper had reported the committee's result and published the text, on June 13, 1775. The article gave the date of adoption of the Mecklenburg Resolves as May 31, 1775. It did not list any signatories.

== Controversy surrounding a "declaration" ==
According to North Carolinian folklore, citizens of Mecklenburg County assembled in Charlotte on May 20, 1775, and wrote a declaration of independence from Britain, known as the "Mecklenburg Declaration of Independence". Some claim it to be the first 'declaration of independence' in America. Such a declaration would have antedated the less freedom-seeking Resolves by eleven days (a contradiction in logic); and would have preceded the Declaration of Independence by over a year.

=== Conjecture and missing evidence ===
Seal of North Carolina showing date of the supposed Declaration

The date of a Mecklenburg Declaration is immortalized on the flag of North Carolina

Conclusive evidence of an independence-seeking document has not been found, even in extant newspapers of the time.

Following the 1800 fire, several reported attempts at that time to re-create the text of the burned document added to the confusion and controversy. This is especially true because some of the "re-created text" now borrowed actual passages from the United States Declaration of Independence. The text of the supposed declaration was created not only from an attempted reconstruction cobbled together decades after the events of 1775 from the memories of the few surviving signers (including John McKnitt Alexander) but also from the descendants of the May 1775 drafting committee relying on passed-down family lore. (Note: After the original documents relating to the Mecklenburg Resolves were destroyed by fire in 1800, Alexander attempted to recreate them from memory. Alexander made some rough notes which still survive (internal evidence indicates that these notes were written after the 1800 fire). Like some of his contemporaries, Alexander mistakenly remembered the radical Mecklenburg Resolves as being an actual declaration of independence. This misconception led Alexander (or perhaps another unknown writer), to borrow language from Jefferson's well-known Declaration of Independence when attempting to recreate the Mecklenburg Declaration as was written in his rough notes. Also, the eleven-day discrepancy between the two documents (May 20 and May 31) may be the result from some confusion in reconciling Old Style and New Style dates.)

Many historians believe the story of a declaration of independence was created by surviving document signers many years after the event, who mistakenly remembered the actual events surrounding the adoption of the Mecklenburg Resolves. Following the fire that destroyed the originals, references to the Resolves and the Declaration were used increasingly more interchangeably, until the time of the Massachusetts Essex Register News publication (1819) of the purported text of a "Declaration". The background information for that article was supplied by McKnitt's son—two years after his death. Each statement printed in the Essex Register article begins with the word, 'Resolved'. The article was judged a hoax at the time by Thomas Jefferson and John Adams.

The controversy over the Mecklenburg Declaration entered a new phase with the discovery of the text of Mecklenburg Resolves. It was then asked how can one account for two very different sets of resolutions supposedly adopted only eleven days apart by the same committee? How was it possible that citizens of Mecklenburg County declared independence on May 20, and then met again on May 31, to pass less revolutionary resolutions? For skeptics of the Mecklenburg Declaration, the answer was that the Declaration was a misdated, inaccurate recreation of the authentic Resolves. Supporters of the Declaration maintain that both documents are genuine, and were adopted to serve different purposes.

=== North Carolina's official acceptance ===
Nonetheless, the North Carolina government has endorsed the story, and the date of the unverified Mecklenburg Declaration, rather than the verified "Mecklenburg Resolves," is memorialized on the State Seal and the North Carolina state flag (see illustrations).

== See also ==
- Halifax Resolves
