= List of Continental Army units (1776) =

The Continental Army was the army raised by the Second Continental Congress to oppose the British Army during the American Revolutionary War. The army went through three major establishments: the first in 1775, the second in 1776, and the third from 1777 until after the end of the war. The 1776 differed in some significant ways from both the 1775 establishment and the 1777 establishment.

== Second establishment ==
The Continental Army was established by the Continental Congress on June 14, 1775, which is also recognized as the founding date of its successor, the United States Army. On that day, the Continental Congress assumed responsibility for militia regiments that had been raised by the colonies of New Hampshire, Massachusetts, Rhode Island, and Connecticut. These units and others authorized by Congress served in the Siege of Boston and the invasion of Quebec launched in September 1775. With these operations ongoing, Congress voted to authorize a second establishment of the army for 1776.

The enlistments of most soldiers in the Continental Army of 1775 expired on the last day of the year. On January 1, 1776, a new army was established. General George Washington had submitted recommendations for reorganization to the Continental Congress almost immediately after accepting the position of Commander-in-Chief, but these took time to consider and implement. Despite attempts to broaden the recruiting base beyond New England, the 1776 army remained skewed toward the Northeast both in terms of its composition and geographical focus.

=== Main Army units ===
Numbered infantry regiments

The bulk of the newly organized Main Army (that was commanded by General Washington) consisted of 27 infantry regiments, which were numbered in order of the seniority of the colonel of each regiment, and styled as "Continental Regiments". This differed from the regiments in the Southern Department, which retained state designations, some of which were assigned in the 1775 establishment. The Main Army regiments were created by reorganizing existing units and by encouraging soldiers to reenlist for another year. Each new regiment comprised eight companies, which at full strength fielded a total of 728 men. Of these, 640 provided the firepower (privates and corporals with muskets); the remaining were officers and staff, including three field officers (a colonel, lieutenant colonel, and major), a captain for each company, a surgeon, a quartermaster, drummers, etc. Other units were also authorized.

| # | State | Colonels | 1775 establishment predecessor | 1777 establishment successor |
|---|---|---|---|---|
| 1st | Pennsylvania | William Thompson; Edward Hand (March 7, 1776) | 1st Pennsylvania Regiment | 1st Pennsylvania Regiment |
| 2nd | New Hampshire | James Reed | 3rd New Hampshire Regiment | 3rd New Hampshire Regiment |
| 3rd | Massachusetts | Ebenezer Learned | 4th Massachusetts Regiment | 4th Massachusetts Regiment |
| 4th | Massachusetts | John Nixon | 6th Massachusetts Regiment | 6th Massachusetts Regiment |
| 5th | New Hampshire | John Stark | 1st New Hampshire Regiment | 1st New Hampshire Regiment |
| 6th | Massachusetts | Edward Wigglesworth; Asa Whitcomb | None; raised July 11, 1776 | 13th Massachusetts Regiment |
| 7th | Massachusetts | William Prescott | 9th Massachusetts Regiment (not to be confused with the 1777 9th Massachusetts Regiment) | Disbanded; remnants joined the 2nd Massachusetts Regiment |
| 8th | New Hampshire | Enoch Poor | 2nd New Hampshire Regiment | 2nd New Hampshire Regiment |
| 9th | Rhode Island | James Mitchell Varnum | 1st Rhode Island Regiment | 1st Rhode Island Regiment |
| 10th | Connecticut | Samuel Holden Parsons; John Tyler | 6th Connecticut Regiment | 6th Connecticut Regiment |
| 11th | Rhode Island | Daniel Hitchcock | 2nd Rhode Island Regiment | 2nd Rhode Island Regiment |
| 12th | Massachusetts | Moses Little | 24th Massachusetts Regiment | Disbanded. |
| 13th | Massachusetts | Joseph Read | | |
| 14th | Massachusetts | John Glover | 23rd Massachusetts Regiment | Disbanded. |
| 15th | Massachusetts | John Paterson | | 1st Massachusetts Regiment |
| 16th | Massachusetts | Paul Dudley Sargent | | 8th Massachusetts Regiment |
| 17th | Connecticut | Jedediah Huntington | | |
| 18th | Massachusetts | Edmund Phinney | | 12th Massachusetts Regiment |
| 19th | Connecticut | Charles Webb | | |
| 20th | Connecticut | John Durkee | | |
| 21st | Massachusetts | Jonathan Ward | | |
| 22nd | Connecticut | Samuel Wyllys | | |
| 23rd | Massachusetts | John Bailey | | 2nd Massachusetts Regiment |
| 24th | Massachusetts | John Greaton | | 3rd Massachusetts Regiment |
| 25th | Massachusetts | William Bond | | |
| 26th | Massachusetts | Loammi Baldwin | Gerrish's Regiment | 9th Massachusetts Regiment |
| 27th | Massachusetts | Israel Hutchinson | | 5th Massachusetts Regiment |

Other infantry units

- Commander-in-Chief's Guard.
- Rawlings' Independent Maryland Rifle Company. Captain Moses Rawlings. (Consolidated with the Maryland and Virginia Rifle Regiment, June 14, 1776).
- Williams' Independent Maryland Rifle Company. Captain Thomas Price continued from 1775; Captain Otho Holland Williams, January 14, 1776. (Consolidated with the Maryland and Virginia Rifle Regiment, June 14, 1776).
- Stephenson's Independent Virginia Rifle Company. Captain Hugh Stephenson. (Consolidated with the Maryland and Virginia Rifle Regiment, June 14, 1776).
- Maryland and Virginia Rifle Regiment. Colonel Hugh Stephenson, Lieutenant Colonel Moses Rawlings, Major Otho Holland Williams. (Formed June 14, 1776).

Artillery

- Continental Artillery Regiment (Massachusetts). Colonel Henry Knox.

=== Canadian Department units ===
Initial infantry units

- Wooster's Provisional Regiment. Brigadier General David Wooster; field commander, Lieutenant Colonel Andrew Ward. (Formed in Canada in December 1775 by consolidation of the remnants of the disbanded 4th and 5th Connecticut Regiments (1775) with the 1st Connecticut Regiment (1775); disbanded April 15, 1776).
- Van Schaick's Regiment (New York). Colonel Goose Van Schaick. (Raised from the 2nd New York Regiment of 1775; designated the 1st New York Regiment in 1777).
- 2nd Pennsylvania Battalion. Colonel Arthur St. Clair. (Assigned to the Canadian Department, January 8, 1776; designated the 3rd Pennsylvania Regiment in 1777).
- 1st Canadian Regiment. Colonel James Livingston.
- 2nd Canadian Regiment. Colonel Moses Hazen.

Continental Regiments authorized by Washington on January 19, 1776 after Montgomery's defeat at the Battle of Quebec (December 31, 1775)

- Bedel's Regiment (New Hampshire). Colonel Timothy Bedel. (Most of Bedel's command was captured at the Battle of The Cedars in May 1776, and was released shortly afterwards).
- Porter's Regiment (Massachusetts). Colonel Elisha Porter.
- Burrall's Regiment (Connecticut). Colonel Charles Burrall.

Reinforcements dispatched from New York City on April 15, 1776 under Brigadier General William Thompson

- 8th Continental Regiment (New Hampshire). Colonel Enoch Poor.
- 15th Continental Regiment (Massachusetts). Colonel John Paterson.
- 24th Continental Regiment (Massachusetts). Colonel John Greaton.
- 25th Continental Regiment (Massachusetts) Colonel William Bond.

Reinforcements dispatched from New York City on April 27, 1776 under Brigadier General John Sullivan

- 2nd Continental Regiment (New Hampshire). Colonel James Reed.
- 5th Continental Regiment (New Hampshire). Colonel John Stark.
- 2nd New Jersey Regiment. Colonel William Maxwell.
- 4th Pennsylvania Battalion. Colonel Anthony Wayne. (Redesignated the 5th Pennsylvania Regiment in 1777).
- 6th Pennsylvania Battalion. Colonel William Irvine. (Redesignated the 7th Pennsylvania Regiment in 1777).

Additional units raised later in the year

- Dubois' Regiment (New York). Colonel Lewis Dubois. (Redesignated the 5th New York Regiment in 1777).
- Nicholson's Regiment (New York). Colonel John Nicholson. (Disbanded December 31, 1776).
- Warner's Regiment (Vermont). Colonel Seth Warner. (Reraised and expanded from the Green Mountain Boys).

=== Northern Department units ===
- Elmore's Regiment (Connecticut). Colonel Samuel Elmore.
- 1st New York Regiment (1775–1776). Colonel Alexander McDougall. (Reorganized February 24-May 21, 1776; assigned to the Main Army, April 24, 1776).
- 2nd New York Regiment (1776). Colonel James Clinton. (Raised from the 3rd New York Regiment of 1775; designated the 4th New York Regiment in 1777).
- 3rd New York Regiment (1776). Colonel Rudolphus Ritzema. (Raised from the 4th New York Regiment of 1775; designated the 2nd New York Regiment in 1777).
- 4th New York Regiment (1776). Colonel Cornelius D. Wynkoop. (Consolidated with Van Schaick's Regiment to form 1st New York Regiment in 1777).
- 1st New Jersey Regiment (1776). (Assigned to various departments in 1776).
- 3rd New Jersey Regiment (1776). (Assigned to various departments in 1776).
- 1st Pennsylvania Battalion. Colonel John Philip De Haas. (Assigned to the Main Army in November; designated the 2nd Pennsylvania Regiment in 1777).
- Mackay's Battalion (Pennsylvania). Colonel Aeneas Mackay. (Assigned to the Main Army in November; designated the 8th Pennsylvania Regiment in 1777).

Artillery units

- Wool's Artillery Detachment (New York). Captain Lieutenant Isaiah Wool. (Remnant of Lamb's Artillery Company of 1775; assigned to the 2d Continental Artillery Regiment in 1777).
- Bauman's Continental Artillery Company. Captain Sebastian Bauman. (Assigned to the Main Army, April 13, 1776; later part of the 2nd Continental Artillery Regiment).
- Romans' Continental Artillery Company. Captain Bernard Romans.

=== Eastern Department units ===
- 6th Continental Regiment (Massachusetts). Colonel Asa Whitcomb. (Assigned to the Northern Department August 8, 1776).
- 14th Continental Regiment (Massachusetts). Colonel John Glover. (Stationed at Beverly, Massachusetts; assigned to the Main Army in New York on July 20, 1776).
- 16th Continental Regiment (Massachusetts). Colonel Paul Dudley Sargent. (Assigned to the Main Army in New York on July 11, 1776).
- 18th Continental Regiment (Massachusetts). Colonel Edmund Phinney. (Assigned to the Northern Department on August 3, 1776).
- 27th Continental Regiment (Massachusetts). Colonel Israel Hutchinson. (Assigned to the Main Army in New York on July 11, 1776).
- Long's Regiment (New Hampshire). Colonel Pierse Long. (Assigned to the Northern Department, November 22, 1776).
- Ward's Regiment (Connecticut). Colonel Andrew Ward. (Assigned to the Main Army, August 1, 1776).

Rhode Island Garrison Regiments.

Two regiments of Rhode Island state troops which served with the Continental Army in 1776, but were not placed on the Continental establishment.

- Richmond's Regiment (Rhode Island). Colonel William Richmond. (Assigned to the Eastern Department, November 1775).
- Babcock's/Lippitt's Regiment (Rhode Island). Colonel Henry Babcock: January 15, 1776; Colonel Christopher Lippitt: May 1776. (Assigned to the Main Army, May 11, 1776).

=== Middle Department units ===
The Middle Department was created on February 27, 1776, as a military administrative district embracing New York, New Jersey, Pennsylvania, Delaware, and Maryland. When the Main Army moved from Boston to New York in April 1776 and Washington opened his headquarters in New York City, he assumed direct command of the department. As a result the Main Army became, for the remainder of the war, the field army associated with the Middle Department. At the same time New York and the Northern Department became practically coextensive; only the Hudson Highlands and parts of New York to the south remained in the Middle Department. These changes left Washington holding three posts at once: Commander-in-Chief of the Continental Army, Commanding General of the field army under his immediate command, the Main Army, and Commanding General of the Middle Department.

Infantry units

- 3rd Pennsylvania Battalion. Colonel John Shee. (Assigned to the Middle Department, February 27, 1776; assigned to the Main Army, June 11, 1776; captured at Fort Washington, New York, on November 16, 1776; reconstituted and designated the 4th Pennsylvania Regiment in 1777).
- 5th Pennsylvania Battalion. Colonel Robert Magaw. (Assigned to the Middle Department, February 27, 1776; assigned to the Main Army, June 11, 1776; captured at Fort Washington, New York, on November 16, 1776; reconstituted and designated the 6th Pennsylvania Regiment in 1777).
- Delaware Regiment. Colonel John Haslet: January 19, 1776; Colonel David Hall: April 5, 1777. (Assigned to the Main Army, August 5, 1776. Colonel Haslet was killed at the Battle of Princeton, January 3, 1777).
- 1st Maryland Regiment. Colonel William Smallwood. (State regiment assigned to the Main Army, July 6, 1776; placed on the Continental establishment, August 17, 1776).
- 2nd Maryland Regiment (Separate state companies assigned to the Main Army, July 6-August 15, 1776; placed on the Continental establishment, August 17, 1776).
- German Battalion (8th Maryland). Colonel Nicholas Haussegger. (Assigned to the Main Army, September 23, 1776).
- Westmoreland Independent Companies (Westmoreland County, Connecticut). Captains Samuel Ransom and Robert Durkee. (Assigned to the Main Army, December 12, 1776).

=== Southern Department units ===
The Continental Congress established the Southern Department on February 27, 1776. The department was the organizing unit for regiments raised in Virginia, North and South Carolina, and Georgia.

Virginia infantry

- 1st Virginia Regiment (1776). Colonel James Read. (Assigned to the Main Army on July 20, 1776).
- 2nd Virginia Regiment (1776). Colonel William Woodford. (assigned to the Main Army on December 27, 1776).
- 3rd Virginia Regiment (1776). Colonel Hugh Mercer: February 13, 1776; Colonel George Weedon: August 13, 1776. (Assigned to the Main Army on July 20, 1776).
- 4th Virginia Regiment (1776). Colonel Adam Stephen: February 13, 1776; Colonel Thomas Elliott: September 3, 1776. (Assigned to the Main Army on September 3, 1776).
- 5th Virginia Regiment (1776). Colonel William Peachy: February 13, 1776; Colonel Charles Scott: May 7, 1776. (Assigned to the Main Army on September 3, 1776).
- 6th Virginia Regiment (1776). Colonel Mordecai Buckner. (Assigned to the Main Army on September 3, 1776).
- 7th Virginia Regiment (1776). Colonel William Dangerfield: February 20, 1776; Colonel William Crawford: August 14, 1776. (Assigned to the Main Army on December 27, 1776).
- 8th Virginia Regiment (1776). Colonel Peter Muhlenberg. (Assigned to the Main Army on January 21, 1777).
- 9th Virginia Regiment (1776). Colonel Charles Fleming: March 2, 1776; Colonel Isaac Read: August 13, 1776. (Assigned to the Main Army on November 23, 1776).

North Carolina infantry

- 1st North Carolina Regiment (1776). Colonel Francis Nash. (Assigned to the Main Army on February 5, 1777).
- 2nd North Carolina Regiment (1776). Colonel Alexander Martin. (Assigned to the Main Army on February 5, 1777).
- 3rd North Carolina Regiment (1776). Colonel Jethro Sumner. (Assigned to the Main Army on February 5, 1777).
- 4th North Carolina Regiment (1776). Colonel Thomas Polk. (Assigned to the Main Army on February 5, 1777).
- 5th North Carolina Regiment (1776). Colonel Edward Buncombe. (Assigned to the Main Army on February 5, 1777).
- 6th North Carolina Regiment (1776). Colonel John Alexander Lillington; field commander, Lieutenant Colonel William Taylor, from May 6, 1776. (Assigned to the Main Army on February 5, 1777).

South Carolina infantry

- 1st South Carolina Regiment (1775). Colonel Christopher Gadsden: June 17, 1775; Colonel Charles Cotesworth Pinckney: September 16, 1776.
- 2nd South Carolina Regiment (1775). Colonel William Moultrie: June 17, 1775; Colonel Isaac Motte: September 16, 1776.
- 5th South Carolina Regiment (1st South Carolina Rifle Regiment). Colonel Isaac Huger.
- 6th South Carolina Regiment (2d South Carolina Rifle Regiment). Colonel Thomas Sumter.

Georgia infantry

- 1st Georgia Regiment. Colonel Lachlan McIntosh: January 7, 1776; Colonel Joseph Habersham: September 16, 1776.

Cavalry units

- 3rd South Carolina Regiment (1775), (South Carolina Ranger Regiment). Colonel William Thompson: June 17, 1775. (Converted to infantry in 1777).
- Georgia Regiment of Horse Rangers.
- North Carolina Corps of Light Dragoons.

Artillery units

- 4th South Carolina Regiment (South Carolina Artillery Regiment). Colonel Owen Roberts.
- Virginia State Artillery Company. Captain James Innis.
- Virginia Continental Artillery Company. Captain Dohickey Arundel.
