= List of Continental Army units =

The Continental Army was the national army of first the Thirteen Colonies, and then the independent United States, during the American Revolutionary War, established by a resolution of the Congress on June 14, 1775, three days before the Battle of Bunker Hill, where it saw its first action under that title. The Continental Congress took a number of steps in the spring of 1775 to create the army in response to the Battles of Lexington and Concord in April and the seizure of Fort Ticonderoga in May. The units composing the Continental Army changed frequently, especially in the first two years of the war. From 1777 to the close of the war, the organization of the Continental Army became progressively more systematic and sophisticated. The Continental Army that served at Yorktown in 1781 bore very little resemblance to the Continental Army that blockaded Boston in 1775.

The Continental Congress was hostile to maintaining standing armies. Under the Articles of Confederation the Congress did not have the power to raise national troops by means of a draft. Enlistment in the Continental Army was voluntary; and throughout the war there were Americans who elected to fight for King George III rather than for Congress. Further, under the Articles of Confederation, the Continental Congress could not raise its own revenue directly. Because of the resulting shortages in money and manpower, the Continental Army was often expected to work in conjunction with state-controlled militia units. These units were called out as needed for short periods. On several occasions the militia performed well, but Washington frequently noted the inefficiency of the militia in his correspondence.

== First establishment, 1775 ==
On June 14, 1775, the Continental Congress assumed responsibility for the regular troops that had been raised by the colonies of New Hampshire, Massachusetts, Rhode Island, and Connecticut in response to the Battles of Lexington and Concord. This date is considered to be the founding date of the United States Army. Most of these troops were besieging the British garrison in Boston. The force adopted by the Continental Congress amounted to 39 regiments of infantry, and 1 regiment and 1 separate company of artillery.

On the same date the Continental Congress for the first time ordered troops to be raised for national defense. It ordered that ten companies of "expert riflemen" be raised in Pennsylvania, Maryland, and Virginia, specifying their organization, pay, and term of enlistment. Before this date, the Congress had merely adopted units already raised by the states or, as in New York, simply promised financial support for a stated number of troops, leaving further action to the state.

In July 1775, a second force in New York under Major General Philip Schuyler was designated the New York Department, which would later be called the Northern Department. Schuyler's smaller army was created to defend New York, but he was authorized by the Continental Congress to launch a preemptive (and ultimately disastrous) invasion of Canada, which began on August 31, 1775.

The Continental regiments in the Southern colonies saw active service before the year ended, fighting forces raised by Virginia's royal governor, Lord Dunmore, at Great Bridge in December. In this action the 2nd Virginia Regiment was commanded by William Woodford, who later became a brigadier general in the Continental Army.

== Second establishment, 1776 ==
At the end of 1775 the Siege of Boston was no nearer to resolution than it had been in April, and the attempt to capture Quebec had received a significant setback with the loss of the Battle of Quebec. To continue the war the Continental Congress voted to reraise the army at Boston and to maintain Continental units elsewhere. Before the Siege of Boston ended in March 1776 the Continental Congress was supporting troops from every colony except Maryland. The new units were to serve from January 1 to December 31, 1776. British troops withdrew from Boston in March 1776, after which commander in chief George Washington sent most of them to New York City where the British were expected to attack. The invasion of Quebec ended with an ignominious retreat to Fort Ticonderoga in July, and Continental troops participated in the defense of Charleston, South Carolina in the Battle of Sullivan's Island, and in North Carolina at the Battle of Moore's Creek Bridge.

Washington commanded forces moved from Boston and Ticonderoga in the failed defense of New York, losing at Long Island, White Plains and most seriously at Fort Washington, where nearly 3,000 soldiers were captured. Forced to retreat all the way across New Jersey to Pennsylvania, Washington closed the campaign season with major victories in the battles of Trenton and Princeton at the close of the year and early in 1777. The fact that his army was disbanding at the critical moment between Trenton and Princeton was the result of the unfortunate fact that its one-year term of service was then expiring, but Washington convinced a significant number of soldiers to overstay their enlistments.

=== Main Army ===
The bulk of the newly organized Main Army consisted of 27 infantry regiments, numbered in order of the seniority of the colonel of each regiment. These regiments were created by reorganizing existing units and by encouraging soldiers to reenlist for another year. Each new regiment comprised eight companies, which at full strength fielded a total of 728 men. Of these, 640 provided the firepower (privates and corporals with muskets); the remaining were officers and staff, including three field officers (a colonel, lieutenant colonel, and major), a captain for each company, a surgeon, a quartermaster, drummers, etc.

Washington announced a new organization of the Main Army in General Orders, January 24, 1776. The organization was similar to the organization of 1775, but with new regiments.

=== Canadian Department ===
Established January 17, 1776. Discontinued July 8, 1776.

In January 1776, Congress reorganized the New York Department, designating the force that had invaded Canada as the Canadian Department. Units were consolidated, and a second regiment of Canadians was recruited. After Washington learned of Brigadier General Richard Montgomery's death and defeat at the Battle of Quebec, three New England units originally intended as militia were instead raised as Continental regiments, commanded by Colonels Bedel, Porter, and Burrall, and sent to Canada.

At Quebec, Major General John Thomas took command of Canadian Department in May 1776. Additional reinforcements from the Main Army led by Brigadier General William Thompson arrived in mid-May, but were immediately disabled by an outbreak of smallpox. After General Thomas succumbed on June 2, Brigadier General John Sullivan, who had arrived with a second group of reinforcements on May 31, took command of the department. When British Major General John Burgoyne arrived in Quebec with reinforcements, the Americans withdrew to Fort Ticonderoga by July 1776. Major General Horatio Gates arrived to take command of the Canadian Department, but with no troops in Canada, the department ceased to exist. Gates, under Schuyler's Northern Department, organized 15 Continental units as the "Northern Army" in the Fort Ticonderoga area. The remaining units, some of them in poor shape after service in Canada, were retained by Schuyler as a rear echelon guarding the Mohawk River valley.

=== Northern Department ===
Established from Middle Department, April 14, 1776. Continued to January 15, 1783.

=== Eastern Department ===
Established April 4, 1776. Discontinued November 1779.

Following the British evacuation of Boston, Massachusetts, on March 17, 1776, Washington led the Continental Army (the Main Army) to New York City. He left a Continental garrison at Boston, under Major General Artemas Ward, in case the British should return. In the summer of 1776 it became clear to Washington that the main British effort would be directed against New York City and northern New York, and he reached the conclusion that the Continental regiments at Boston were more urgently needed elsewhere. He therefore ordered them to reinforce either his own army or the Northern Army under Major General Philip Schuyler. The Eastern Department became a secondary theater until the Battle of Rhode Island in 1778.

Rhode Island Garrison Regiments

Two regiments of Rhode Island state troops served with the Continental Army in 1776, but were not placed on the Continental establishment.

=== Middle Department ===
Established February 27, 1776. Continued to close of war.

The Middle Department was originally created as a military administrative district embracing New York, New Jersey, Pennsylvania, Delaware, and Maryland. When the Main Army moved from Boston to New York in April 1776 and Washington opened his headquarters in New York City, he assumed direct command of the department. As a result, the Main Army became, for the remainder of the war, the field army associated with the Middle Department. At the same time New York and the Northern Department became practically coextensive; only the Hudson Highlands and parts of New York to the south remained in the Middle Department. These changes left Washington holding three posts at once: Commander-in-Chief of the Continental Army, Commanding General of the field army under his immediate command, the Main Army, and Commanding General of the Middle Department.

=== Southern Department ===
Established February 27, 1776. Continued to close of war.

The Continental Congress raised troops in the southern colonies before the Southern Department was created. It had called for troops from the Southern colonies eight months before the department was established. On the date that the Southern Department came into existence the Continental Congress had accepted or authorized a dozen Southern infantry regiments, a number that would double within the next six months.

North Carolina Continentals

As early as June 26, 1775, some eight weeks after the Battles of Lexington and Concord, the Continental Congress voted to support 1,000 men in North Carolina. These were organized as the 1st and 2d North Carolina Regiments of 1775. A third North Carolina regiment was raised in January 1776 and two more regiments were raised in March. A sixth North Carolina regiment was authorized in April. All six of these regiments had become a part of the Continental Army by the summer of 1776.

Virginia Continentals

The Continental Congress assumed responsibility for the two existing Virginia provincial regiments on November 1, 1775. These were the 1st and 2d Virginia Regiments of 1775. On December 28, 1775, the Continental Congress requested four more regiments from Virginia. In January 1776 the colony authorized these six regiments for the Continental Army and authorized three more regiments as state troops. All nine of these regiments had become a part of the Continental Army by the summer of 1776. A separate company of artillery was authorized by Virginia on December 1, 1775. In March the Continental Congress adopted this company and authorized one more.

South Carolina and Georgia Continentals

On November 4, 1775 – the same date on which it authorized the 27 numbered Continental regiments of 1776 – the Congress authorized two battalions from South Carolina and one battalion from Georgia for the Continental Army. South Carolina then transferred the 1st and 2d South Carolina Regiments to the Continental Army. Two more South Carolina provincial regiments (5th and 6th regiments of rifles) were adopted by the Continental Army on March 25, 1776, followed by the 4th Regiment of Artillery on June 18, 1776. The 3rd Regiment of mounted rangers was adopted on July 24, 1776.

Establishment of the department

In February 1776 a superior headquarters was urgently needed to administer the rapidly growing number of Continental regiments being raised in the South. The Southern Army, as the troops in the Southern Department were known, met its first major test successfully when it repulsed the British attack on Charleston, South Carolina, on June 28, 1776.

== Third establishment, 1777–1784 ==
Despite its antipathy to standing armies the Continental Congress was forced by the loss of New York and the prospect of a permanent British presence there to raise a standing army of its own. Congress created the third establishment on September 16, 1776, voting to raise an army of 88 regiments of infantry. Each of the thirteen states was assigned a quota based on its population. Enlistments in this army were to be for either three years or the duration of the war. This program was augmented in December 1776 when Washington was given authority to raise an additional 16 regiments of infantry (see "Additional" regiments). The army of 1777 was also a better-balanced force than the two which preceded it. Besides the infantry, the artillery was increased to a brigade under Henry Knox, a cavalry brigade was organized, originally under Casimir Pulaski, and eventually the Continental Army included partisan units, engineer troops, military police, and invalids. In 1777, 119 regiments were fielded. On paper these regiments contained over 90,000 officers and men. In later years this ambitious program was reduced to one that was more sustainable, through consolidation or elimination of surplus units.

The Continental Army of 1777 was a result of several critical reforms and political decisions that came about when it was apparent that the British were sending massive forces to put an end to the Revolution. In order to create a more stable, better trained army that would not cease to exist at the end of each year — the army had nearly collapsed at the end of 1776 — men were now enlisted for the duration of the war. Because many men were reluctant to enlist for such an indefinite period, Congress also offered the alternative of a three–year enlistment.

=== Eighty-Eight Battalion Resolve ===
On September 16, 1776, the Continental Congress passed the "eighty-eight battalion resolve," which called for each state to contribute regiments in proportion to their population. (The terms regiment and battalion were virtually interchangeable at that time since nearly every Continental Army regiment consisted of a single battalion). The quota of infantry regiments was fixed at 15 each from Massachusetts and Virginia, 12 from Pennsylvania, 9 from North Carolina, 8 each from Connecticut and Maryland, 6 from South Carolina, 4 each from New York and New Jersey, 3 from New Hampshire, 2 from Rhode Island, and 1 each from Delaware and Georgia. Each state was expected to arm, clothe, and equip its regiments. A state's quota of infantry regiments was collectively known as that state's "line", such as the Pennsylvania Line. A state "line" was an administrative designation and not a tactical formation like a brigade or division.

=== Washington's "Dictatorial Powers" ===
Washington and his generals believed that 88 regiments were insufficient to challenge the British Army, and so on December 27, 1776, Congress gave Washington the authority to raise additional regiments which were placed directly under his control and not under any state. These additional units consisted of 16 infantry regiments, three artillery regiments, a corps of engineers, and 3,000 light horsemen. Including three other regiments previously authorized by Congress (the two Canadian regiments and Seth Warner's regiment of Green Mountain Boys), 110 regiments were authorized for the Continental Army of 1777. Some states exceeded their quotas, and so 119 regiments were actually fielded in 1777.

The decisions implemented in 1777 determined the basic organizational structure of the Continental Army for the duration of the war. Although the army raised in 1777 was the army which served until the close of the war, the Continental Army of 1777 underwent a general reorganization on three important occasions.

=== Reorganizations ===
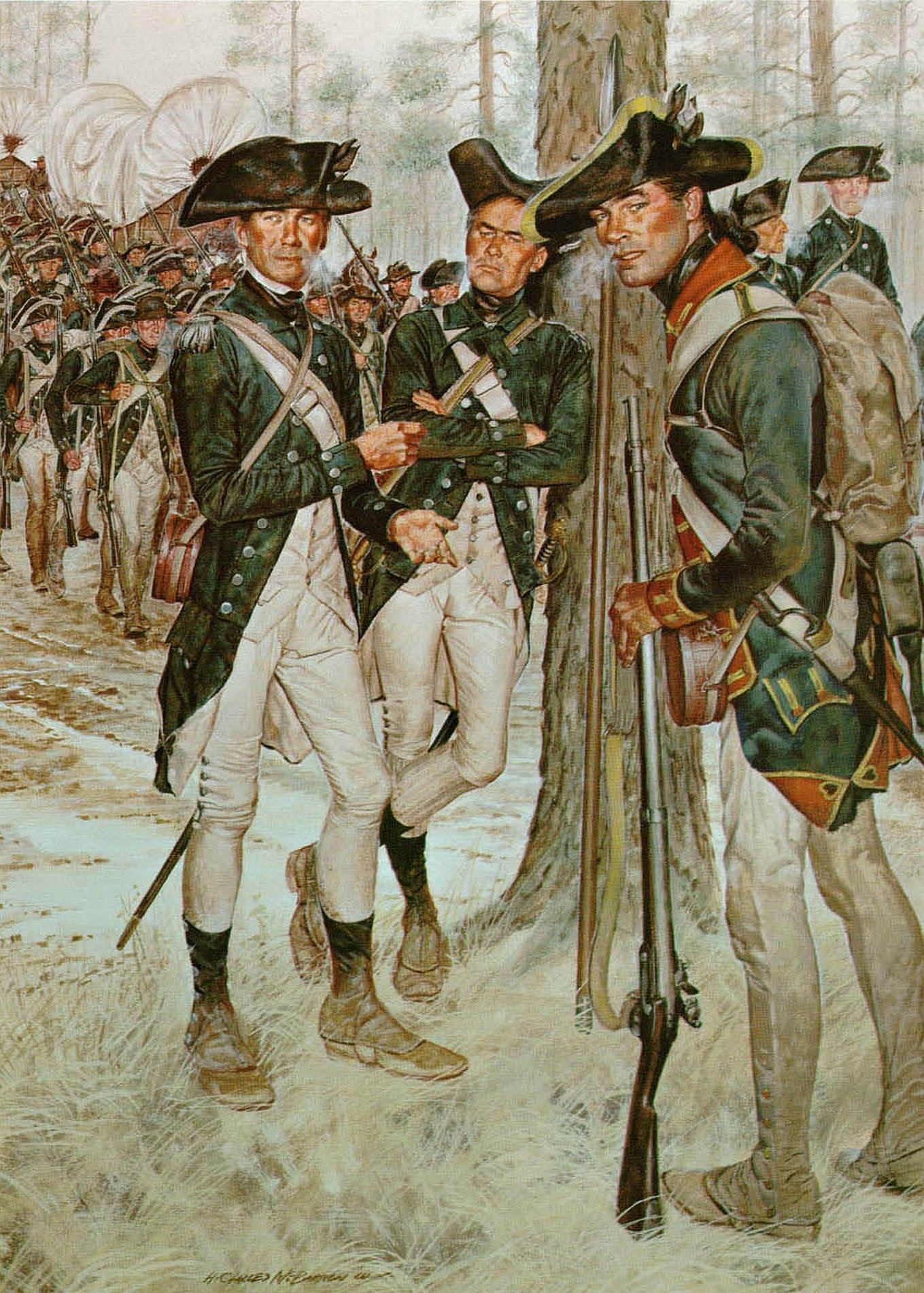
Continental Army soldiers 1782. In the right foreground is an enlisted artilleryman. In the left and center foreground are shown a captain and a lieutenant.

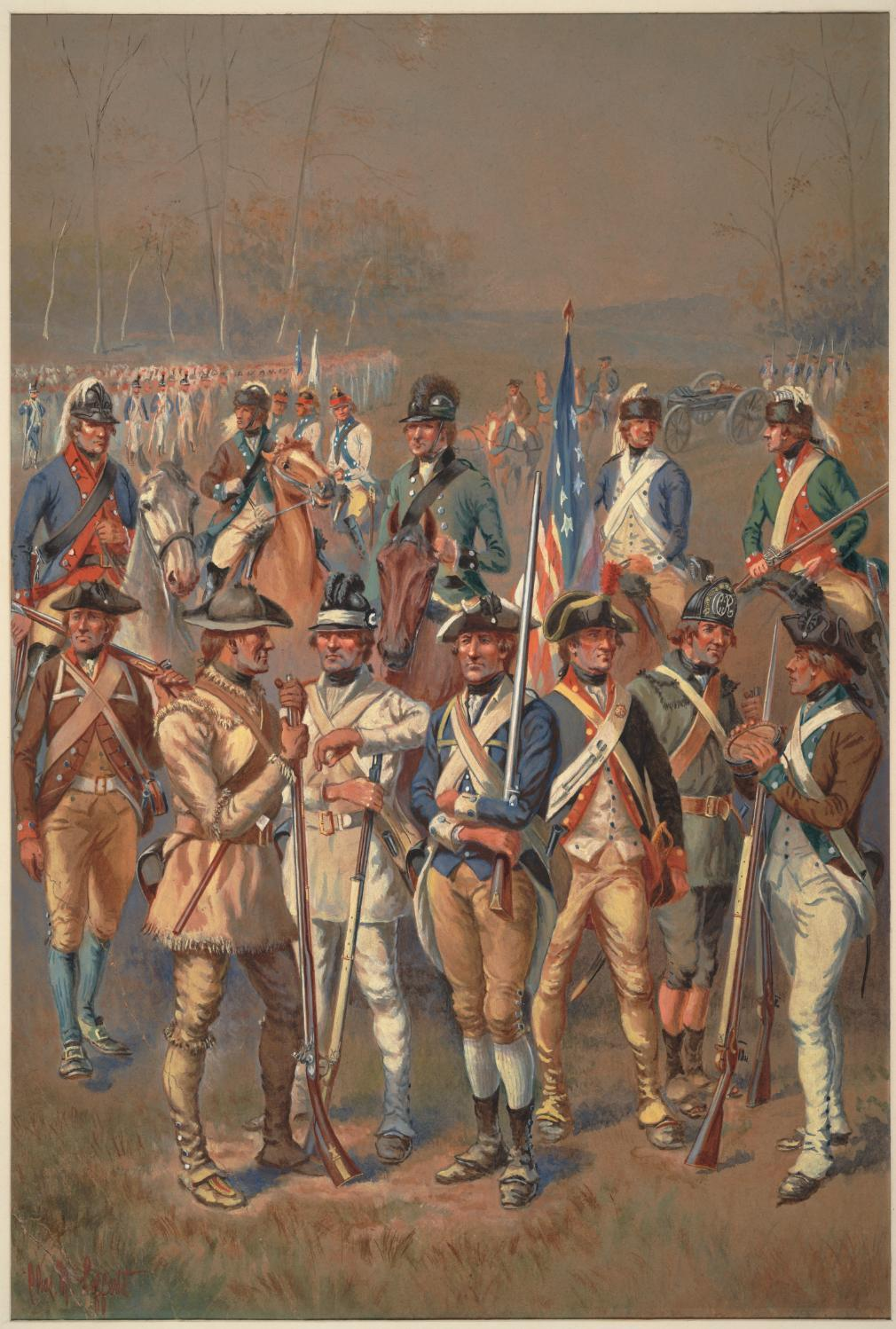
A watercolor painting by Charles M. Lefferts depicting a variety of Continental Army uniforms

On 27 May 1778 Congress reduced the quota of infantry regiments in the state lines to 80. The new regiments were smaller by one-third to cut expenses, and for the first time included a permanent light infantry company. The light infantry companies were organized collectively into a Corps of Light Infantry modeled on that of the British Army, to replace provisional light infantry units drafted from line companies for the 1777 and 1778 campaigns. The quota of infantry regiments was so adjusted that Massachusetts provided 15, Pennsylvania and Virginia each provided 11, Connecticut and Maryland each provided 8, North Carolina and South Carolina each provided 6, New York provided 5, New Hampshire and New Jersey each provided 3, Rhode Island provided 2, and Delaware and Georgia each provided 1. Congress also consolidated some of the weaker Additional Continental Regiments. Because this reorganization was proposed just as the campaign of 1778 was about to begin, it was implemented gradually over the next ten months, and finalized on March 9, 1779.

In October 1780, with the three-year enlistments of 1777 soon to expire, the Continental Congress ordered a new organization of the Continental Army, to become effective on January 1, 1781. The number of infantry regiments was reduced to 50 (including Hazen's 2d Canadian Regiment, which was retained as the Canadian Regiment). The new regiments were larger, and for the first time they included a regimental depot. The quota of infantry regiments was fixed at 10 from Massachusetts, 8 from Virginia, 6 from Pennsylvania, 5 each from Connecticut and Maryland, 4 from North Carolina, 2 each from New Hampshire, New York, New Jersey, and South Carolina, and 1 each from Rhode Island, Delaware, and Georgia. The few Additional Continental Regiments that had survived to this late date were either allotted to a state line or disbanded. The support of the Continental Army's cavalry and artillery regiments was also made the responsibility of a definite state for the first time, but they retained their status as separate branches of the Continental Army.

As of January 1, 1781, the states were made responsible for regiments in other branches as follows: 1st and 3rd Legionary Corps (formerly 1st and 3d Light Dragoons): Virginia; 2d Legionary Corps (2nd Light Dragoons): Connecticut; and 4th Legionary Corps (4th Light Dragoons): Pennsylvania — 1st Artillery: Virginia; 2d Artillery: New York; 3d Artillery: Massachusetts; and 4th Artillery: Pennsylvania.

Thus the total number of regimental equivalents was reduced to 61. This number included 50 infantry regiments, 4 legionary corps (which were partly dismounted light dragoons), 4 artillery regiments, 2 partisan corps, and 1 artificer regiment.

Finally, on August 7, 1782, the Continental Congress resolved that the Continental Army should be so reduced that, if possible, all its units should contain at least 500 rank and file. This reorganization was to become effective on January 1, 1783. Under this resolve, the infantry of the Continental Army was reorganized to consist of 1 regiment and 1 battalion (4 companies) from New Hampshire (effected March 1, 1783), 8 regiments from Massachusetts, 1 battalion (6 companies) from Rhode Island, 3 regiments from Connecticut, 2 regiments from New York, 1 regiment and 1 battalion (4 companies) from New Jersey (effected March 1, 1783), 3 regiments from Pennsylvania, 1 regiment (2 companies) from Delaware, 2 regiments from Maryland, 2 regiments from Virginia, 1 regiment and 1 battalion from North Carolina, 2 regiments from South Carolina, and 1 regiment (3 companies) from Georgia. In this instance, with some exceptions, the term "battalion" was used to designate a unit with less than the regulation nine companies.

== Demobilization ==
When the Continental Army was demobilized in 1783, a single regiment, the 1st American Regiment remained, under the command of Colonel Henry Jackson. In 1784 this regiment was disbanded. A single company of artillery was reassigned to a new regiment, the First American Regiment, the predecessor to the United States Army's 3rd US Infantry Regiment.

== See also ==
- List of American Revolutionary War battles
- List of George Washington articles
- List of British Forces in the American Revolutionary War
- Bibliography of George Washington
- Bibliography of Thomas Jefferson
