= List of South Carolina militia units in the American Revolution =

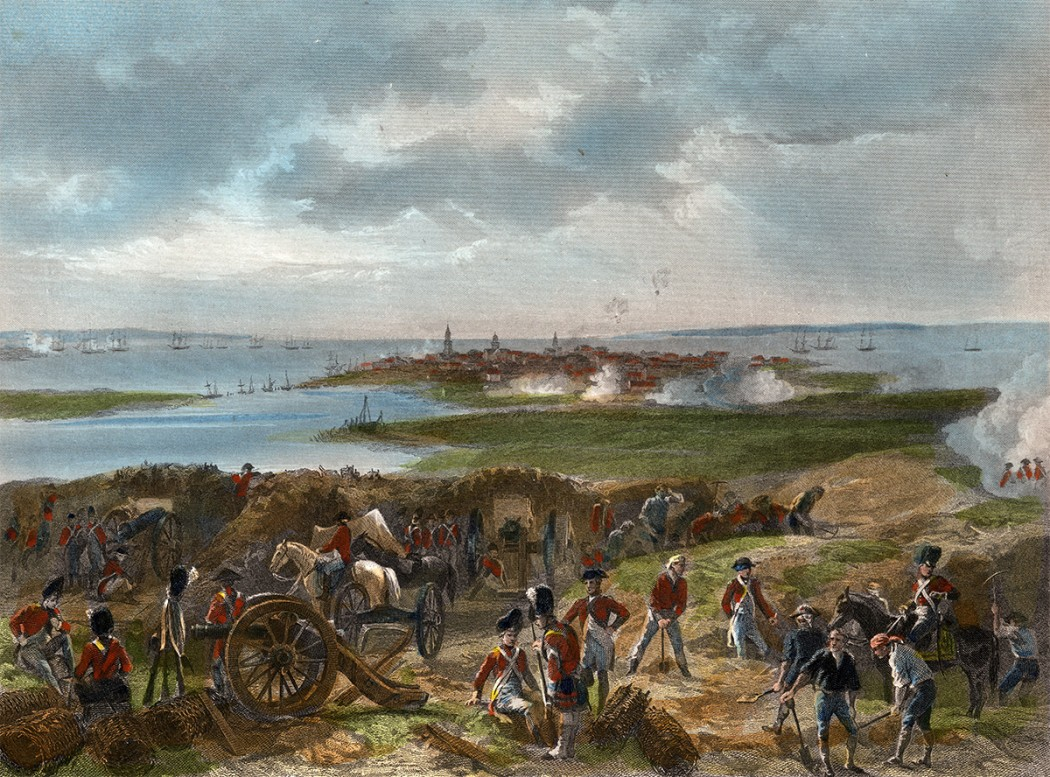
Siege of Charleston

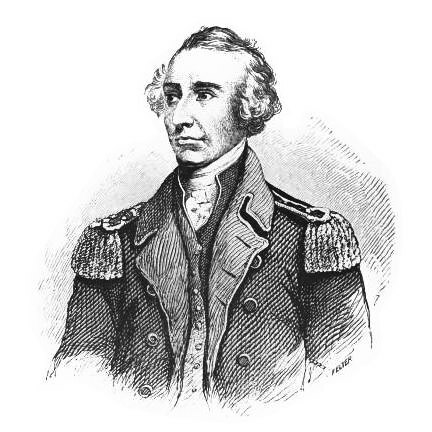
BG Francis Marion, 2nd Brigade commander

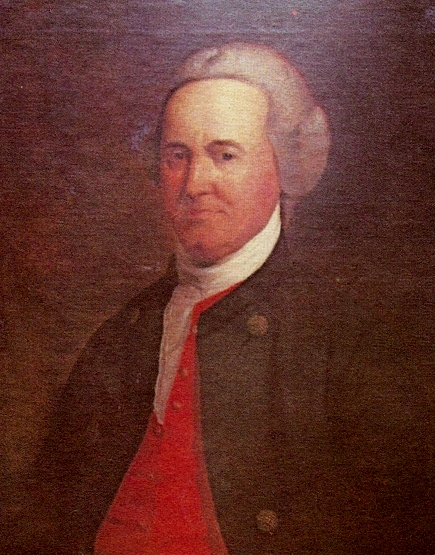
BG Richard Richardson, 2nd Brigade commander

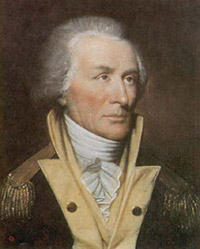
BG Thomas Sumter, 1st and 6th Brigade commander

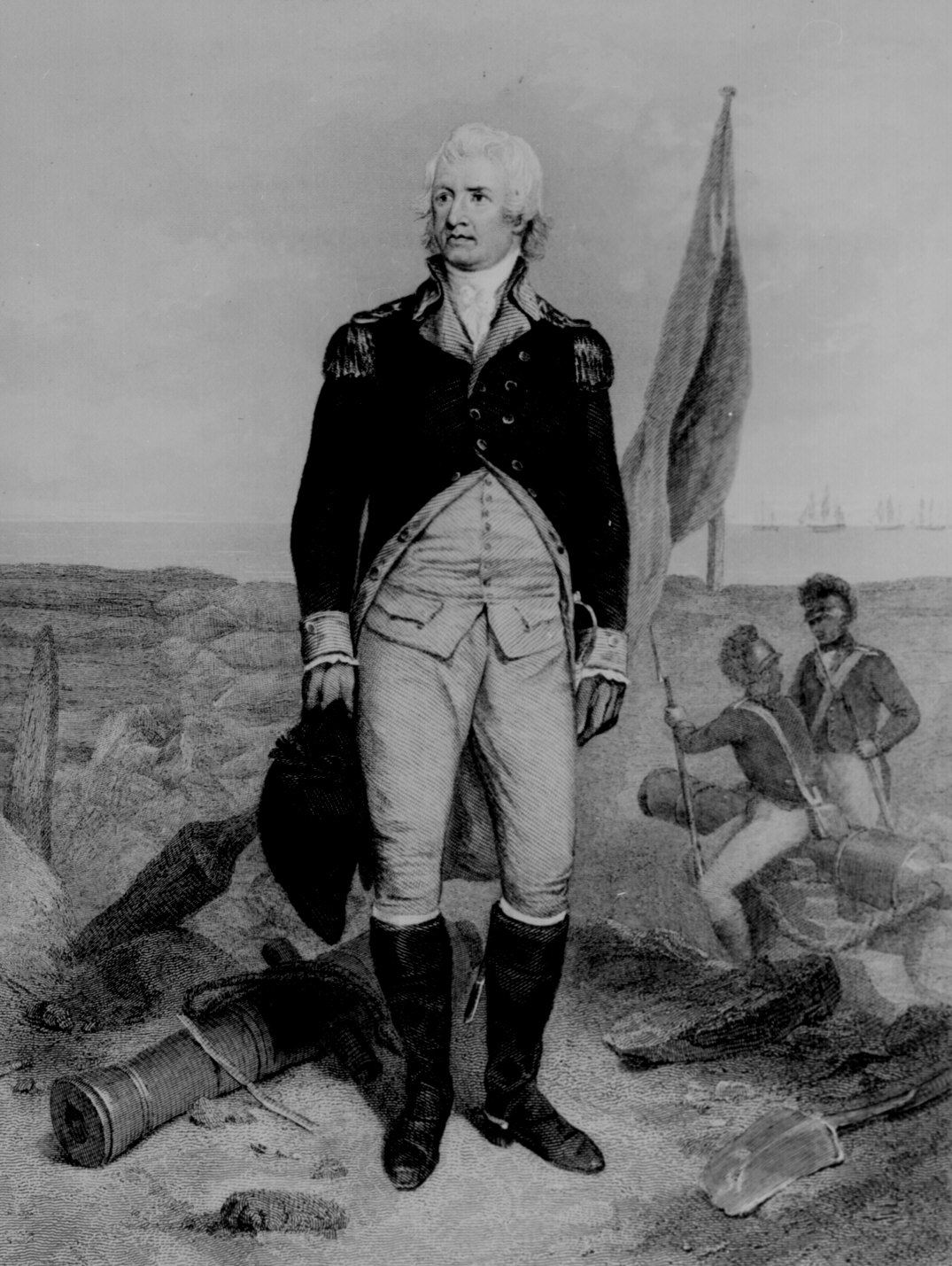
Col William Moultrie, Charles Town District Regiment commander

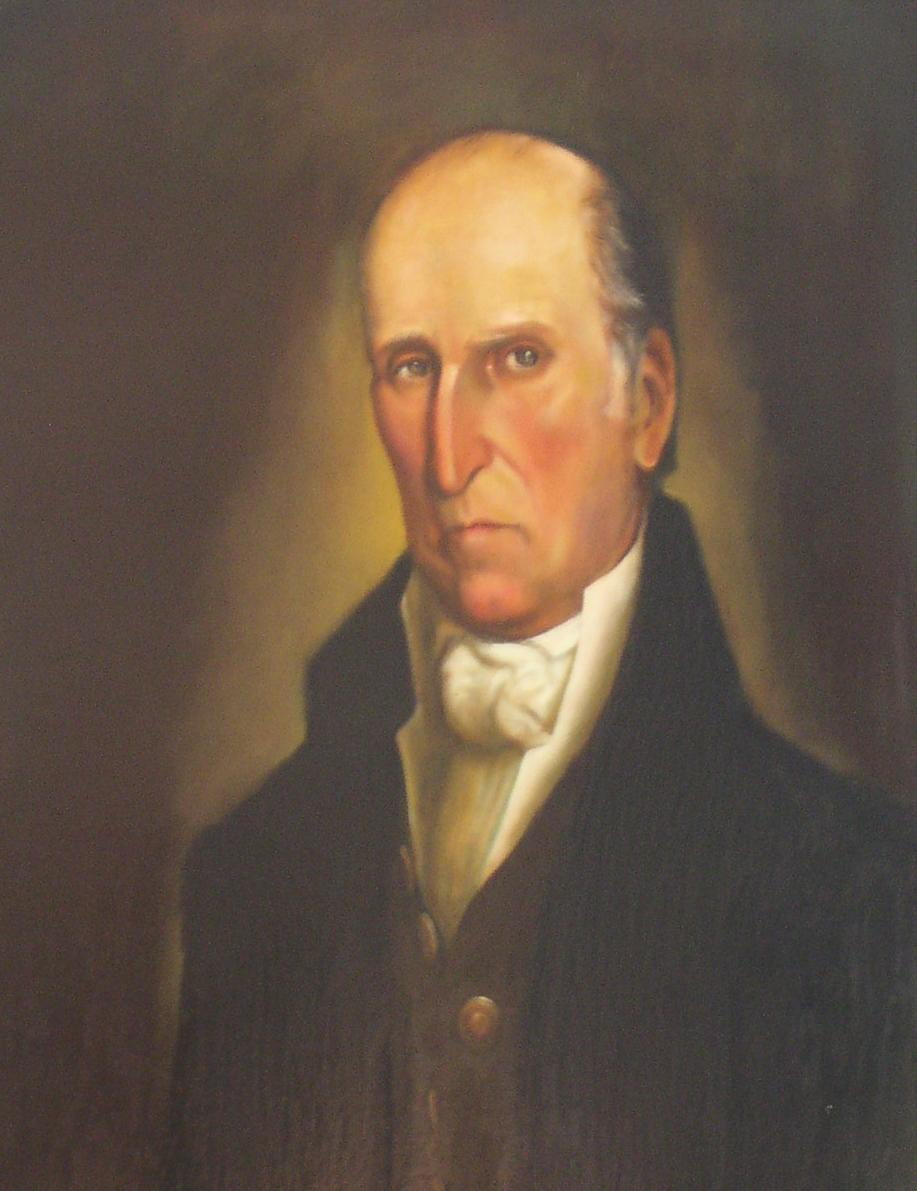
Col Andrew Pickens, Ninety-Six Regiment commander

The South Carolina militia units in the American Revolution were established on January 17, 1775, by the South Carolina Provincial Congress. These militia units were subordinate to the South Carolina Council of Safety. Officers were selected by February 1775. In November 1775, the militia units were renamed regiments. On March 28, 1778, the South Carolina General Assembly consolidated the regiments into four brigades, each led by a Brigadier General.

== Militia units ==
The first sixteen militia were established in February 1775. While initially called just militia, they were renamed as regiments in November 1775. When Charlestown fell on May 12, 1780, most of the generals were taken as prisoners by the British and the regiments were left to fend for themselves. Most new regiments were Light Dragoons vice infantry.

The known regiments, brigades, and independent units included:

South Carolina militia units in the American Revolution
| Unit Name | Subordination | Date established | Disbanded | Original Commander, Rank | Refs |
|---|---|---|---|---|---|
| 1st Brigade | Council of Safety | March 25, 1778 | May 12, 1780 | Stephen Bull, BG | |
| 2nd Brigade | Council of Safety | March 25, 1778 | May 12, 1780 | Richard Richardson, BG | |
| 3rd Brigade | Council of Safety | March 25, 1778 | May 12, 1780 | Andrew Williamson, BG | |
| 4th Brigade | Council of Safety | March 25, 1778 | May 12, 1780 | Alexander McIntosh, BG | |
| Beaufort District Militia/ Regiment | 1st Brigade (1778–1780) | February 1775 | | Stephen Bull, Col | |
| Forks of Saluda District Militia/ Regiment (Note: The Forks of Saluda District Regiment was renamed the Lower District Regiment in November 1775. It was also referred to as the Dutch Forks Regiment) | 3rd Brigade | February 1775 | | Robert Starke, Col | |
| Camden District Militia/ Regiment | 2nd Brigade (1778–1780); Col Sumter (backcountry) (1780) | February 1775 | | Richard Richardson, Col | |
| Little River District Militia/ Regiment | 3rd Brigade (1778–1780) | February 1775 | | John Lindsay, Col | |
| Charles Town District Militia/ Regiment | 1st Brigade (1778–1780) | February 1775 | | William Moultrie, Col | |
| New Acquisition District Militia/ Regiment | 2nd Brigade (1778–1780); Col Sumter (backcountry) (1780) | February 1775 | | Thomas Neel, Col | |
| Cheraws District Militia/ Regiment | 4th Brigade (1778–1780); Marion's Brigade (1781) | February 1775 | | George Gabriel Powell, Col | |
| Upper Saluda District Militia/ Regiment (Note: The Upper Saluda District militia was renamed the Spartan Regiment in September 1775. In November 1775, the Spartan Regiment was split into 1st Spartan Regiment and 2nd Spartan Regiment in February 1777) | 2nd Brigade | February 1775 | September 1775 | Thomas Fletchall, Col | |
| 1st Spartan Regiment | 2nd Brigade (1778–1780) | February 1777 | | John Thomas, Sr., Col | |
| 2nd Spartan Regiment | 2nd Brigade (1778–1780); Col Sumter (backcountry) (1780) | February 1777 | | Thomas Brandon, Col | |
| Georgetown District Militia/ Regiment | 4th Brigade (1778–1780) | February 1775 | | Thomas Screven, Col | |
| Berkeley County Militia/ Regiment | 1st Brigade (1778–1780); Marion's Brigade (1781) | February 1775 | | Richard Singleton, Col | |
| Ninety-Six District Militia/ Regiment (Note: The Ninety-Six District militia was split into Upper Ninety-Six Regiment and Lower Ninety-Six Regiment on March 28, 1778.) | 3rd Brigade | February 1775 | | John Savage, Col | |
| Upper Ninety-Six Regiment | 3rd Brigade (1778–1780) | March 28, 1778 | | Andrew Pickens, Col | |
| Lower Ninety-Six Regiment | 3rd Brigade (1778–1780) | March 28, 1778 | | LeRoy Hammond, Col | |
| Colleton County Militia/ Regiment | 1st Brigade (1778–1780) | February 1775 | | Joseph Glover, Col | |
| Orangeburgh District Militia/ Regiment | 3rd Brigade (1778–1780); Col Sumter (backcountry) (1780) | February 1775 | | William Thomson, Col | |
| Craven County Militia/ Regiment (Note: The Craven County militia was split into Upper Craven County Regiment and Lower Craven County Regiment in November 1775.) | Council of Safety | February 1775 | November 1775 | Job Rotmahler, Col | |
| Upper Craven County Regiment | 4th Brigade (1778–1780); Marion's Brigade | November 1775 | | George Hicks, Col | |
| Lower Craven County Regiment | 4th Brigade (1778–1780); Marion's Brigade (1781) | November 1775 | | Job Rothmahler, Col | |
| Fairfield Regiment | 2nd Brigade (1778–1780); Col Sumter (backcountry) (1780) | February 1775 | | Joseph Kershaw, Col | |
| Granville County Militia/ Regiment | 1st Brigade | February 1775 | June 1780 | Benjamin Garden, Col | |
| Upper Granville County Regiment | 2nd Brigade | June 1780 | | William Harden, LTC, Col | |
| Lower Granville County Regiment | 2nd Brigade | June 1780 | | William Stafford, LTC | |
| Kingstree Regiment (Note: The Kingstree Regiment was established in late 1779 or 1780.) | 4th Brigade (1780); Marion's Brigade (1781) | December 1779, January 1780 | | Archibald McDonald | |
| Kershaw Regiment | Col Sumter (backcountry) (1780) | June 1780 | | James Postell, Col | |
| Turkey Creek Regiment | Col Sumter (backcountry) (1780) | May 1780 | | Edward Lacey, Col | |
| Polk's Regiment of Light Dragoons | North Carolina's Mecklenburg County Regiment; South Carolina State Troops (Note: Polk's Regiment of Light Dragoons was a subset of the North Carolina's Mecklenburg County Regiment of militia until in became part of the South Carolina State troops in April 1781) | July 1780 | | William Polk, Col | |
| Hampton's Regiment of Light Dragoons | Col Sumter (backcountry) (1780) (Note: Hampton's Regiment of Light Dragoons became part of the South Carolina State Troops in April 1781) | July 1780 | | Henry/Wade Hampton, Col | |
| Hill's Regiment of Light Dragoons | Col Sumter (backcountry) (1780) (Note: Hill's Regiment of Light Dragoons became part of the South Carolina State Troops in April 1781) | July 1780 | | William Hill, Col | |
| 1st Brigade (after fall of Charleston) | Council of Safety | Aug 1780 | | Thomas Sumter, Col/BG | |
| 2nd Brigade (after fall of Charleston) | Council of Safety | Aug 1780 | | Francis Marion, Col/BG | |
| 3rd Brigade (after fall of Charleston) | Council of Safety | July 1781 | | Andrew Pickens, BG | |
| Horry's Light Dragoons | 2nd Brigade | February 16, 1781 | | Peter Horry, LTC | |
| Maham's Light Dragoons (Note: Maham's Light Dragoons became the 3rd Regiment of State Dragoons in October 1781.) | 2nd Brigade | Mar 1781 | | Hezekiah Maham, Maj | |
| Hammond's Light Dragoons Regiment | 3rd Brigade (Note: Hammond's Light Dragoons Regiment became part of the South Carolina State Troops in September 1781) | April 1781 | | Samuel Hammond LTC/Col | |
| 4th Brigade (after fall of Charleston) | Council of Safety | September 1781 | | John Barnwell BG | |
| Independent Company of Rangers | Independent | 1775 | 1776 | John Bowie, CPT | |
| Independent Company of Rangers | Independent | 1775 | | Robert Ellison, CPT | |
| Independent Company of Rangers | Independent | 1775 | 1776 | Benjamin Tutt, CPT | |
| Independent Company of Rangers | Independent | 1775 | 1780 | Ezekiel Polk, CPT | |
| Indian Field Company | Independent | 1775 | | John Fullerton, CPT | |
| Catawba Indian Company of Rovers | Independent | 1775 | 1776 | Samuel Boykin, CPT | |
| Charles Town Artillery Company | Independent | 1775 | | Owen Robert, CPT | |
| Racoon Company | Independent | 1776 | 1780 | John Allston, CPT | |
| Indian Company of Rovers | Independent | 1776 | | John Withers, LT/CPT | |
| Charles Town Artillery Company | Independent | 1778 | 1780 | Sims White, CPT | |
| Independent Company | Independent | 1781 | 1781 | William Clay Snipes, Maj | |

== Provincial and state units ==
For clarification and comparison purposes, the South Carolina provincial and state troop units are listed below:

| Unit | Date established | Disbanded | Continental Line, Date | Original Commander, Rank | Ref |
|---|---|---|---|---|---|
| 1st Regiment (Infantry) | June 6, 1775 | May 12, 1780 | Yes, November 4, 1775 | Christopher Gadsden, Col | |
| 2nd Regiment (Infantry) | June 6, 1775 | May 12, 1780 | Yes, November 4, 1775 | William Moultrie, Col | |
| 3rd Regiment (Rangers) | June 6, 1775 | May 12, 1780 | Yes, July 24, 1776 | William Thomson, LTC | |
| 4th Regiment (Artillery) | November 14, 1775 | May 12, 1780 | Yes, June 18, 1776 | Owen Roberts, LTC | |
| 5th Regiment (Rifles) | February 22, 1776 | Feb. 1780 | Yes, March 25, 1776 | Isaac Huger, Col | |
| 6th Regiment (Rifles) | February 28, 1776 | Feb. 1780 | Yes, March 25, 1776 | Thomas Sumter, LTC | |
| Light Dragoons | February 1779 | May 12, 1780 | No | Daniel Horry, Col | |
| 1st Regiment of State Dragoons | April 1781 | 1783 | No | Wade Hampton, I, Col | |
| 2nd Regiment of State Dragoons | April 1781 | 1783 | No | Charles Myddleton, Col | |
| Hampton's Regiment of Light Dragoons | April 1781 | 1783 | No | Henry Hampton, LTC | |
| Polk's Regiment of Light Dragoons | April 1781 | February 1782 | No | William Polk, LTC | |
| Hill's Regiment of Light Dragoons | April 1781 | 1782 | No | William Hill, Col | |
| Hammond's Regiment of Light Dragoons | September 1781 | 1782 | No | Samuel Hammond, Col | |
| 3rd Regiment of State Dragoons | October 1781 | 1783 | No | Hezekiah Maham, LTC | |
| 4th Regiment of State Dragoons | October 1781 | 1782 | No | Peter Horry, LTC | |

== See also ==
- South Carolina in the American Revolution
- Southern Campaigns: Pension Transactions for a description of the transcription effort by Will Graves
- Southern theater of the American Revolutionary War
- South Carolina Line: 1st, 2nd, 3rd, 4th, 5th, 6th Regiments
- List of North Carolina militia units in the American Revolution
- List of United States militia units in the American Revolutionary War

== Bibliography ==
- Buchanan, John (1997). The Road to Guilford Courthouse: The American Revolution in the Carolinas. New York: Wiley.
- Edgar, Walter (2001). Partisans and Redcoats: The Southern Conflict That Turned the Tide of the American Revolution. New York: Morrow. ISBN 9780380977604.
- Edgar, Walter (2016). "South Carolina Encyclopedia, Revolutionary War". scencyclopedia.org. University of South Carolina, Institute for Southern Studies.
- Graves, William T. (2012). Backcountry Revolutionary James Williams (1740-1780), With Source Documents. Southern Campaigns of the American Revolution Press, Lugoff, South Carolina.
- James, William Dobein (1948). A Sketch of the Life of Brig. Gen. Francis Marion and a History of His Brigade From its Rise in June 1780 until Disbanded in December 1782. Continental Book Company.
- Lossing, Benson J. (1852). The Pictorial Field-Book of The Revolution. Vol. 2. Harper and Brothers.
- McCrady, Edward (1901–1902). The History of South Carolina in the Revolution. 2 vols. New York: Macmillan. ISBN 9780722245897.
- Moultrie, William (1802). Memoirs of the American Revoloution. David Longworth.
- Russel, David Lee (2000). The American Revolution in the Southern Colonies. McFarland. ISBN 9780786407835.
