= Hezekiah Maham =

Hezekiah Maham (June 26, 1739 - 1789) was a legislator in South Carolina and a soldier in the South Carolina State Troops. He was a member of the first Provincial Congress of South Carolina. During the American Revolution, he commanded the South Carolina 3rd Regiment of State Dragoons.

== Early life ==
Hezekiah Maham was born on June 26, 1739, in St. Stephens Parish, South Carolina, where he became a successful planter by 1772. His plantation was in what is now Berkeley County, South Carolina. He was elected to several terms in the South Carolina General assembly both before and after the Revolutionary War as a representative and senator. He was known for his temper and once made a deputy sheriff eat the summons that he was trying to serve on him.

== Military service ==
He was elected a Captain in the 5th South Carolina Regiment (Rifles) under Colonel Isaac Huger in the Spring of 1776. He fought with this unit at the Siege of Savannah and the Battle of Stono Ferry. As a Lieutenant Colonel, he commanded the South Carolina 3rd Regiment of State Dragoons from October 1781, which was originally Maham's Light Dragoons since March 1781. He became ill in 1782 and was arrested by the British but paroled. He died in 1789 and was buried at the Maham Plantation Cemetery in Berkeley County, South Carolina.

Engagements in which the South Carolina 3rd Regiment of State Dragoons participated in during the American Revolution included:

- Nov. 17, 1781, Fair Lawn Plantation
- Nov. 19, 1781, Wappetaw Church
- Jan. 3, 1782, Battle of Videau's Bridge
- Feb. 24, 1782, Wambaw Bridge
- Feb. 25, 1782, Tidyman's Plantation
- Aug. 1782, White Hall
- Aug. 29, 1782, Caper's Scout

Engagements in which Maham's Light Dargoons participated in during the American Revolution included:

- Apr. 15, 1781, Siege of Fort Watson
- Jul. 17, 1781, Quinby's Bridge
- Jul. 17, 1781, Wadboo Bridge
- Jul. 17, 1781, Shubrick's Plantation
- Aug. 24, 1781, Well's Plantation
- Sep. 8, 1781, Battle of Eutaw Springs
- Oct. 16, 1781, Battle of Monck's Corner

== Tombstone ==
The inscription on his tombstone reads:

FRONT SIDE - "Within this Cemetery, and in the bosom of the homestead which he cultivated and embellished while on earth, lie the mortal remains of COLONEL HEZEKIAH MAHAM. He was born in the parish of St. Stephens, and died A.D. 1789, at fifty years; leaving a name unsullied in social and domestic life, and eminent for devotion to the liberties of his country, and for achievements in arms, in the Revolution which established her independence."

RIGHT SIDE - "Impelled by the spirit of freedom which animated his countrymen, he devoted himself to its support, and promoted the cause of American Independence, by his service in the state committees, instituted by recommendation of the General Congress, in the Jacksonborough Assembly, and in various other civil capacities."

LEFT SIDE - "Successively a captain of the first rifle regiment, a commander of horse in Marion's brigade, and lieutenant colonel of an independent corps of cavalry, raised by authority of General Greene, he bore an efficient and conspicuous part in the capture of the British posts, and in the series of skillful maneuvers and gallant actions, which resulted in the final extinction of the British dominion in South Carolina, and secured to her and to the confederacy the blessings of Peace, Liberty, and Independence."

ON THE BACK - "His relative, Joshua John Ward, of Waccamaw, unwilling that the last abode of an honest man, a faithful patriot, and a brave and successful soldier, should be forgotten and unknown, has erected this memorial, A.D. 1845."

== See also ==
- List of South Carolina militia units in the American Revolution#Provincial and State units
