= Ezekiel Polk =

American soldier and pioneer (1747–1824)

- Born: December 7, 1747; Cumberland County, Province of Pennsylvania
- Died: August 31, 1824 (aged 76); Hardeman County, Tennessee, U.S.
- Resting place: Polk Cemetery, Bolivar, Tennessee
- Occupations: Soldier, Pioneer
- Known for: Revolutionary War service, grandfather of President James K. Polk
- Spouse: Mary Wilson (m. 1769; died 1791) Bessie Campbell Davis (m. 1792; died 1793) Sofia Neely Lennard (m. 1810)
- Children: 12, including Samuel
- Parent(s): William Polk; Margaret Taylor Polk
- Relatives: Thomas Polk (brother); William Polk (nephew); Leonidas Polk (grandnephew); James K. Polk (grandson); William Polk Hardeman (grandson); Joseph Knox Walker (great-grandson); Lucius M. Walker (great-grandson)
- Military Service
- Allegiance: South Carolina
- Branch: South Carolina militia, South Carolina Line
- Service years: 1775, 1780-1782
- Rank: Lieutenant Colonel
- Units: New Acquisition District Regiment, 3rd South Carolina Regiment
- Commands: Independent Company of Rangers

Ezekiel Polk (December 7, 1747 – August 31, 1824) was an American soldier, pioneer and the paternal grandfather of President James K. Polk.

== Early life ==
Ezekiel Polk was born on December 7, 1747, the seventh of eight children born to William Polk and Margaret Taylor Polk of Cumberland County, Pennsylvania, near present-day Carlisle. Around 1753, the family moved southwestward to the southern boundary of North Carolina in what would become Mecklenburg County. His parents appear to have died shortly afterward, and Ezekiel probably was brought up by his older brother Thomas, the senior member of the family, a leader of the local militia and a member of the first and subsequent North Carolina provincial assemblies.

At age 20 Ezekiel, recently married, was named clerk of court in the new county of Tryon across the Catawba River, where he and his bride established themselves on a 100-acre (0.40 km^{2}) farm just south of Kings Mountain. In 1772, however, the provincial boundary was surveyed, and Polk's property was discovered to lie in South Carolina.

== Career ==
Military service record:

- New Acquisition District Regiment of the South Carolina militia (1775, 1780–1782): First a Lt. Colonel under Col. Thomas Neel in early 1775.
- Then he chose to have an independent company of Rangers prior to 3rd South Carolina Regiment of Rangers being formed on June 6, 1775
- Resigned from South Carolina 3rd Regiment on July 29, 1775. Authorized to reform his independent Ranger Company again in the New Acquisition District, but he was to remain under command of Col. William Thomson. His unit was disbanded at the fall of Charleston.
- Later, he was a Lt. Colonel again in the New Acquisition District Regiment.

Polk adapted with increasing difficulty to the shifting boundary and consequent loss of his position as clerk of court. At first, he was chosen lieutenant colonel of the district militia. In 1775, he was elected a delegate to the South Carolina Provincial Congress held in June and was commissioned a captain in the Third South Carolina Regiment of Horse Rangers, assigned to the interior, where Whigs and Loyalists were competing for control of the province. But when the regiment was ordered to the coast, Polk balked, marching his men home rather than sacrifice their health, as he put it, for the protection of Lowcountry aristocrats and rice plantation nabobs. He subsequently relented, apologized for his insubordination, and was restored to command. He led his company against Loyalist forces in the battle at Reedy River in December 1775 and the following summer commanded 300 militia in a successful expedition against pro-Loyalist Cherokees.

On July 24, 1776, Polk's regiment was adopted into the Continental Army and assigned to the Southern Department. "Captain Ezekiel Polk's Independent Company," according to the U.S. Army's regimental history, was "concurrently redesignated as the 10th Company, 3rd South Carolina Regiment."

Polk may never have been entirely comfortable in South Carolina, and waning popularity and political enmities appear have left him increasingly disgruntled. After being passed over initially as delegate to a provincial congress held in November 1775, he had with great difficulty forced a second election and kept his seat. Probably this aborted rejection continued to rankle. In late 1776 Polk surrendered his commission in the 3rd Regiment and returned to North Carolina, settling down on a 260-acre (1.1 km^{2}) farm about 10 miles (16 km) below Charlotte, the Mecklenburg County seat. Two years later he opened a tavern in town and the following year was named justice of the peace. This period of tranquility was not to last. With the fall of Charleston in 1780 and the subsequent defeat of Horatio Gates at Camden, Lord Charles Cornwallis's triumphant Redcoats marched into North Carolina, the main body encamping a few miles from Polk's farm. The following day, September 26, Cornwallis commandeered the Charlotte home of Ezekiel's brother Thomas and established his headquarters there. Fearing the loss of crops, slaves and his tavern, Ezekiel rode to town and "took protection" from Cornwallis in exchange for peaceful cooperation with the British.

Such an action was not without precedent, and Polk's neighbors evidently did not judge him too harshly, for toward the end of the war the Mecklenburg magistrates, with only two dissenters, elected him sheriff. At the conclusion of the war, he received a generous acreage of western land for his services during the Revolution and in 1790 was appointed deputy surveyor in the Western District (then-Tennessee) and moved with his family to a tract north of the Cumberland River. Indian raids and the prolonged illness and death of his wife in 1791 led to his return to Mecklenburg County. He did not make Tennessee his permanent home until the fall of 1803, when he established himself on a 2,500-acre (10 km^{2}) tract on the Duck River in what is now Maury County.

Polk was a militant Jeffersonian and a Deist (some said an atheist), which put him at loggerheads with much of the family, especially his nephew William Polk's three sons, who were Ezekiel's close Tennessee neighbors, ardent Federalists and orthodox churchmen. The inscription composed for his first wife's tombstone spoke of "a glorious Resurrection to eternal life," but her painful illness and the death of all the children of his second marriage seem to have dampened if not extinguished the bereaved husband's faith.

== Marriages ==
He was married three times. His first wife, Mary Wilson Polk, bore him eight children, including Samuel Polk, the father of James K. Polk, 11th president of the United States. No children of his second wife, Bessie Davis Polk, survived infancy. Some sources identify his second wife as a Polly Campbell. By his third wife, Sofia Neely Lennard Polk, he had four children. He died near Bolivar, Tennessee, August 31, 1824, and was buried in the Polk Cemetery at Bolivar.

== Death ==
Polk composed his own epitaph and left instructions that it be painted on durable wood "as there is no rock in this country fit for grave stones." In its original version, it reads:

Here lies the dust of old E.P.
One instance of mortality
Pennsylvania born, Car'lina bred,
In Tennessee died on his bed
His youthful days he spent in pleasure,
His latter days in gath'ring treasure;
From superstition liv'd quite free
And practiced strict morality.
To holy cheats was never willing
To give one solitary shilling,
He can foresee, and in foreseeing
He equals most of men in being
That church and state will join their pow'r
And mis'ry on this country show'r.
And Methodists with their camp bawling,
Will be the cause of this down falling.
An era not destined to see,
It waits for poor posterity
First fruits and tithes are odious things
And so are Bishops, Priests and Kings

== Ancestry ==
The ancestry of Ezekiel Polk is largely unknown. It has been claimed that his father William Polk is descended from Robert Bruce Polk (1625–1703), a member of Clan Pollock migrated to Maryland; and his mother is a daughter of James Taylor, grandfather of Richard Taylor and great-grandfather of presidents Zachary Taylor and James Madison. Both ancestries are disproved by newer research.
