= 1st South Carolina Infantry Regiment =

1st South Carolina Infantry Regiment may refer to:

- 1st South Carolina Rifle Regiment, a Confederate regiment
- 1st South Carolina Colored Infantry Regiment, a Union regiment
- 1st South Carolina Regiment, a Continental Army regiment that served during the Revolutionary War
