= South Carolina Line =

State-specific military contingency of the Continental Line

The South Carolina Line was a formation within the Continental Army. The term "South Carolina Line" referred to the quota of numbered infantry regiments assigned to South Carolina at various times by the Continental Congress. These, together with similar contingents from the other twelve states, formed the Continental Line. The concept was particularly important in relation to the promotion of commissioned officers. Officers of the Continental Army below the rank of brigadier general were ordinarily ineligible for promotion except in the line of their own state.

== Units belonging to the State Line ==
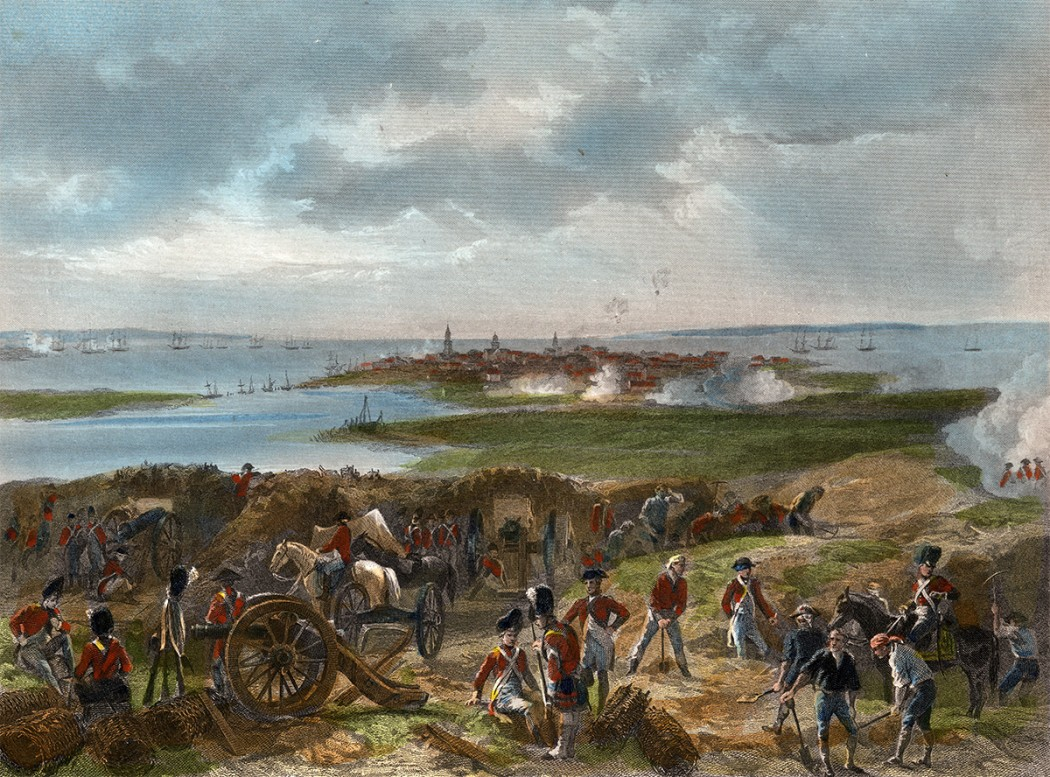
Siege of Charleston

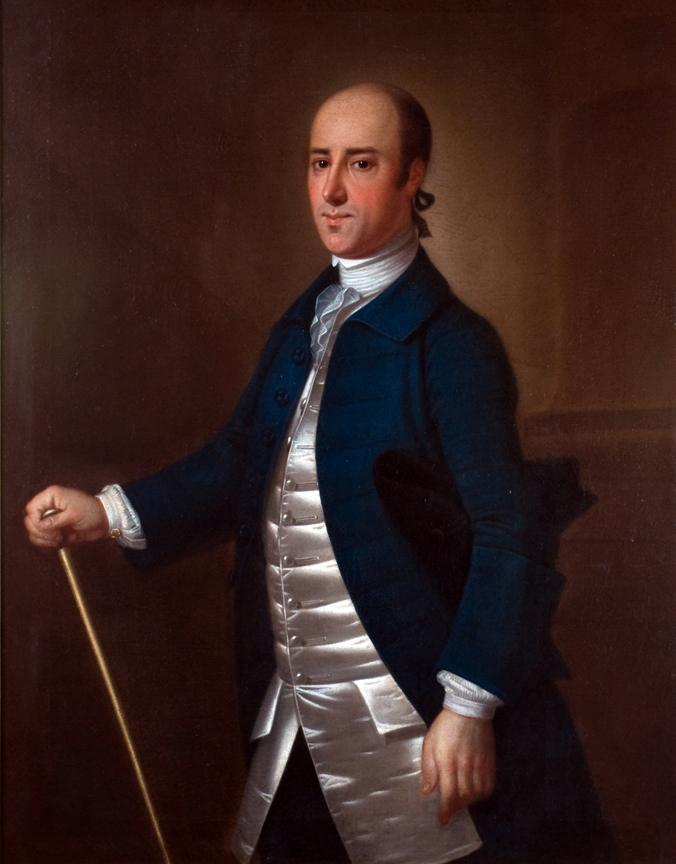
Christopher Gadsden

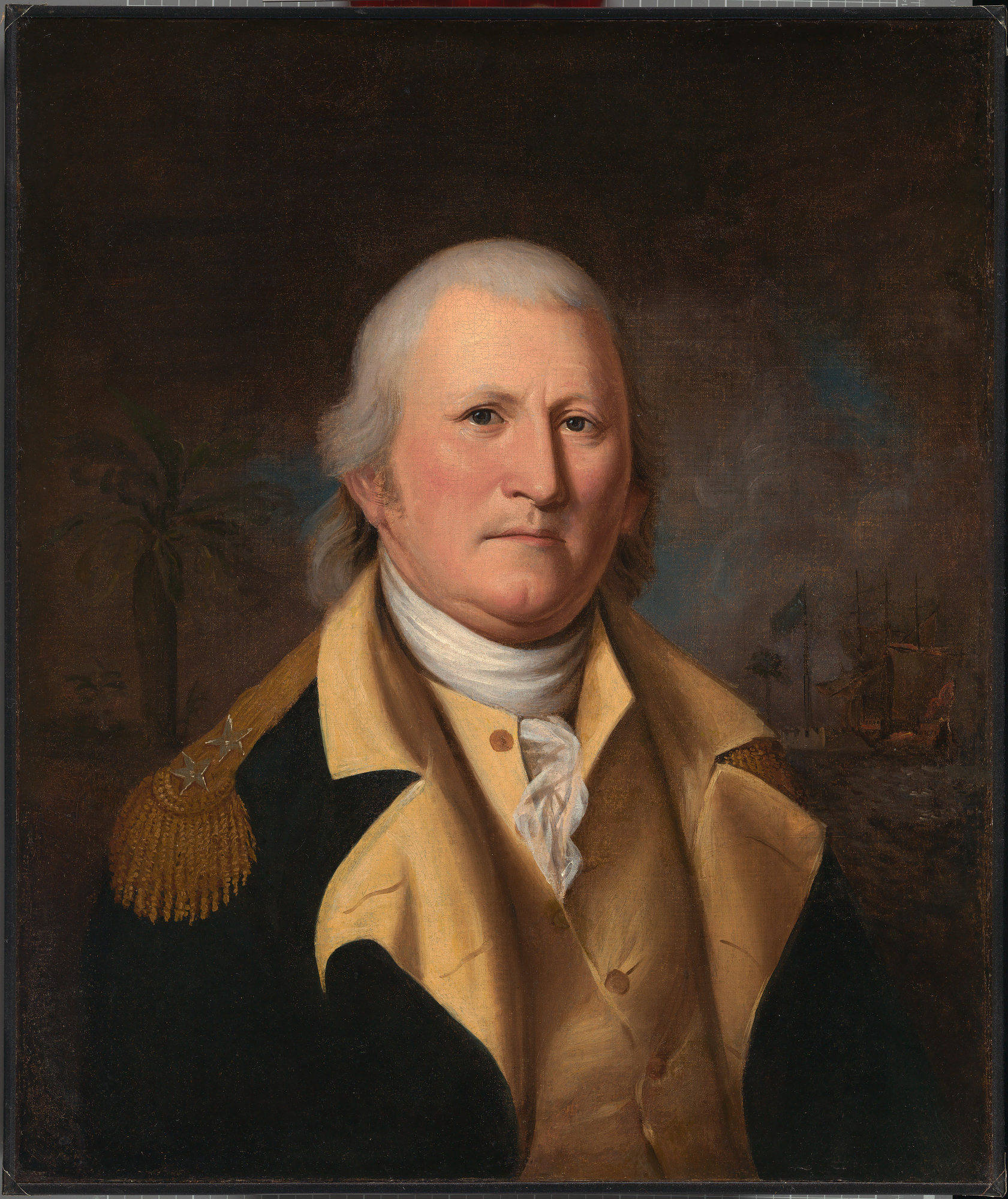
William Moultrie

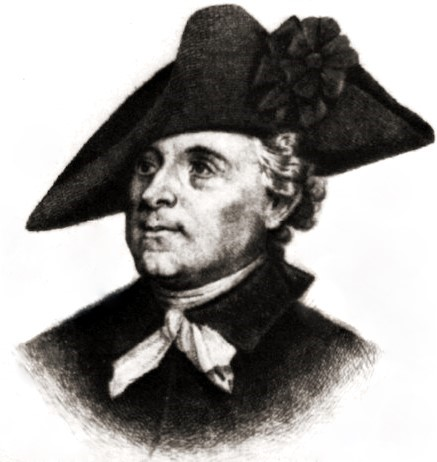
Isaac Huger

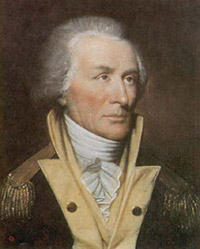
Thomas Sumter

The following units belonged to the South Carolina State troops initially and were transferred to the Continental Army on the dates indicated. The original commanders, their ranks, and the dates the units were established and disbanded are included.

Unit	Date established	Disbanded	Continental Line, Date	Original Commander, Rank	Ref
1st Regiment (Infantry)	June 6, 1775	May 12, 1780	Yes, November 4, 1775	Christopher Gadsden, Col	
2nd Regiment (Infantry)	June 6, 1775	May 12, 1780	November 4, 1775	William Moultrie, Col	
3rd Regiment (Rangers)	June 6, 1775	May 12, 1780	July 24, 1776	William Thomson, LTC	
4th Regiment (Artillery)	November 14, 1775	May 12, 1780	June 18, 1776	Owen Roberts, LTC	
5th Regiment (Rifles)	February 22, 1776	Feb. 1780	March 25, 1776	Isaac Huger, Col	
6th Regiment (Rifles)	February 28, 1776	Feb. 1780	March 25, 1776	Thomas Sumter, LTC	

All of the State Troops that became Continental Line were effectively decimated during the Siege of Charleston—either by action or by surrender on May 12, 1780.

== Engagements ==
Between July 1775 and May 1780, the six regiments participated in engagements in South Carolina, North Carolina, Georgia, and Florida.

South Carolina Line Engagements by Regiment
Date	Battle/Skirmish	State	1st	2nd	3rd	4th	5th	6th
Jul. 9, 1775	Bloody Point	SC	x					
Jul. 12, 1775	Fort Charlotte	SC			x			
Sep. 15, 1775	Fort Johnson	SC	x	x				
Sep. 18, 1775	Battle of Sullivan's Island	SC		x	x			
Oct. 31, 1775	Congaree River	SC			x			
Nov. 3, 1775	Mine Creek	SC			x			
Nov. 11-12, 1775	Hog Island Channel	SC	x					
Nov. 19-21, 1775	Ninety-Six	SC			x			
Dec. 22, 1775	Battle of Great Cane Brake	SC			x			
Dec. 23-30, 1775	Snow Campaign	SC			x			
Jun. 26, 1776	Cherokee Indian Towns	SC			x			
Jun. 28, 1776	Breach Inlet Naval Battle	SC			x			
Jun. 28, 1776	Fort Moultrie	SC	x					
Jun. 28, 1776	Battle of Fort Moultrie/Sullivan's Island	SC		x	x	x	x	x
Jul. 15, 1776	Lyndley's Fort	SC			x			
Jul. 21, 1776	Spencer's Inlet	SC		x				
Aug. 1, 1776	Seneca Town	SC			x		x	x
Aug. 8-11, 1776	Cherokee Towns	SC			x		x	x
Aug. 10, 1776	Tugaloo River	SC			x			
Aug. 12, 1776	Tamassee	SC			x			x
Aug. 12, 1776	The Ring Fight	SC			x			
Sep. 1776	St. Augustine Expedition	FL			x			x
Sep. 19, 1776	Coweecho River	NC						x
Oct. 14, 1776	Altamaha River	GA			x			
Feb. 23 - Mar. 15, 1777	Fort McIntosh	GA			x			
Mar. 7, 1778	Barbados	SC	x					
May - July 1778	Florida Expedition	SC						x
Dec. 29, 1778	Savannah	GA			x	x	x	x
Jan. 6-10, 1779	Fort Morris	GA			x	x		
Feb. 1, 1779	Fort Lyttelton	SC				x		
Feb. 3, 1779	Battle of Beaufort/Port Royal Island	SC	x	x	x	x	x	
Feb. 21, 1779	Georgetown	SC				x		
Mar. 3, 1779	Battle of Brier/Briar Creek	GA	x		x	x		x
Mar. 6, 1779	Georgetown	SC				x		
Apr. - Jul. 1779	Prevost's March	SC			x			
Apr. - May, 1779	Prevost's March on Charleston	SC		x				
Apr. 19, 1779	Savannah	GA		x				
Apr. 29, 1779	Purrysburg	SC				x		
May 1779	Prevost's March on Charleston	SC	x					
May 3, 1779	Coosawhatchie	SC			x		x	x
May 11–13, 1779	Charleston Neck	SC		x		x	x	
Jun. 20, 1779	Battle of Stono Ferry	SC	x		x	x	x	x
Jul. 21, 1779	Ebenezer	GA		x				
Jul. 23, 1779	Savannah River	SC		x				
Sep. 16 - Oct. 18, 1779	Siege of Savannah	GA	x	x	x	x	x	x
Mar. 12, 1780	Two Sisters' Ferry	SC			x			
Mar. 28 - May 12, 1780	Siege of Charleston	SC	x	x	x	x		
Mar. 29-30, 1780	Gibbes' Plantation	SC	x					
Apr. 8, 1780	Sullivan's Island	SC	x					
Apr. 12, 1780	Sullivan's Island	SC	x					
Apr. 25, 1780	Sullivan's Island	SC	x					
May 2, 1780	Haddrell's Point	SC	x					
May 7, 1780	Fort Moultrie	SC	x					

== See also ==
- List of South Carolina militia units in the American Revolution for a list of South Carolina militia and State troops.
