= 6th South Carolina Regiment =

6th South Carolina Regiment (Rifles)
- Active: 1776–1780
- Allegiance: South Carolina, Continental Congress of the United States
- Branch: State Troops, Continental Army
- Type: Infantry (riflemen ?)
- Part of: Regiment

Commanders
- Notable commanders: Lt. Col. Thomas Sumter

The 6th South Carolina Regiment (2nd Rifle Regiment) was authorized on 28 February 1776 in the South Carolina State Troops and was organized during the spring of 1776 as five companies of volunteers from the northwestern region of the colony of South Carolina. It may have been composed exclusively of expert riflemen from the colony.

== History ==
Listed below are the key events in the history of this unit, the commanders, and known engagements as a unit:

- 28 February 1776, authorized as South Carolina Provincial Troops
- Spring 1776, organized at Charleston to consist of five companies from northwestern South Carolina.
- 25 March 1776, adopted into the Continental Army and assigned to the Southern Department
- 18 October 1776, reorganized to consist of six companies (Captain Richbourg's Independent Company, organized in spring 1776 at Charleston with personnel from northwestern South Carolina, concurrently redesignated as the 6th Company, 6th South Carolina Regiment).
- 23 November 1776, assigned to the 1st South Carolina Brigade, an element of the Southern Department.
- 3 January 1779, relieved from the 1st South Carolina Brigade
- 1 February 1779, assigned to the South Carolina Brigade, an element of the Southern Department
- 11 February 1780, consolidated with the 2nd South Carolina Regiment

Commanders:

- Major William Henderson (original officer, 1776), as Lt. Col (1778–1780)
- Lt. Col./Col. Thomas Sumter (1776–1778)

Known Engagements:

- 28 June 1776, Battle of Sullivan's Island/Fort Moultrie, South Carolina
- 1 August 1776, Seneca Town, South Carolina
- 8–11 August 1776, Cherokee Towns, South Carolina
- 12 August 1776, Tamassee, South Carolina
- September 1776, St. Augustine, Florida
- 19 September 1776, Coweecho River, North Carolina
- May–July 1778, Florida Expedition
- 29 December 1778, Capture of Savannah, Georgia
- 3 March 1779, Battle of Briar/Brier Creek, Georgia
- 3 May 1779, Coosawhatchie, South Carolina
- 20 June 1779, Battle of Stono Ferry, South Carolina
- 16 September – 18 October 1779, Siege of Savannah, Georgia

== See also ==
- South Carolina Line: 1st, 2nd, 3rd, 4th, 5th, 6th Regiments
- List of South Carolina militia units in the American Revolution
