= François Malmédy =

18th-century French soldier

François Lellorquis de Malmédy
- Born: c. 1750; France
- Died: November 1781; Sumter County, South Carolina
- Military career
- Allegiance: Kingdom of France; United States
- Branch: Royal French Army; Continental Army
- Service years: –1776 (France); 1776–1783 (US)
- Rank: sous lieutenant Brigadier general
- Nickname: Marquis de Malmédy
- Units: Rhode Island Line; North Carolina Light Dragoons Regiment
- Conflicts: American Revolutionary War; Battle of Stono Ferry; Battle of Eutaw Springs

François Lellorquis de Malmédy (c. 1750–November 1781), the Marquis de Malmédy, (also known as François Malmédy-Gray), possibly a son of Charles-François de Gray de Malmédy and his wife Marie Charlotte Sébastienne Le Masson de Vandelincourt, was a sous lieutenant of cavalry in the French Army prior to 1776 and a Continental Army officer during the American Revolution after he arrived in the American colonies in 1776. He was reported to be descended from a Scottish family named Gray that settled in France.

== Revolutionary War service ==
Malmédy was hot headed and arrogant, refusing to take assignments that he felt were beneath him, as seen in his letters to General Washington.

- 19 September 1776, brevet major in the Rhode Island Line Continental Army
- November 7, 1776, appointed brigadier general in Rhode Island
- December 1776, brigadier general, chief engineer and director of defense works in the Rhode Island Militia
- 10 May 1777, given a Continental commission as colonel
- June 1778, at Battle of Monmouth under Major General Charles Lee
- 20 Jun 1779, commanded a light infantry company at the Battle of Stono Ferry
- 8 September 1781, commanded the North Carolina Light Dragoons Regiment at Battle of Eutaw Springs
- November 1781, killed in a duel by Maj. Smith Snead of Virginia at the High Hills of Santee in Sumter County, South Carolina

== Bibliography ==
- Malmédy, Marquis de, Encyclopedia of the American Revolution: Library of Military History.
- Thomas Gale (2006). "Malmédy, Marquis de; Encyclopedia of the American Revolution".
- Bartlett, John Russell. Records of the Colony of Rhode Island and Providence Plantations, in New England. 10 vols. Providence: A. C. Greene, 1856–1865.
- Bodinier, André. Dictionnaire des officiers de l'armée royale qui ont combattu aux Etats-Unis pendant la guerre d'Indépendance 1776–1783. Vincennes, France: Service historique de l'armée, 5th edition 2010.
- Greene, Nathanael. The Papers of Nathanael Greene. Edited by Richard K. Showman, et al. 11 vols. to date. Chapel Hill: University of North Carolina Press, 1976–.
- Lee, Charles. Papers of Charles Lee. 4 vols. New-York Historical Society Collections 4-7 (1871–1874).
- "To George Washington from François, Marquis de Malmedy, 20 November 1778; From François, Marquis de Malmedy".; “To George Washington from François, Marquis de Malmedy, 20 November 1778,” Founders Online, National Archives, version of January 18, 2019, https://founders.archives.gov/documents/Washington/03-18-02-0247. [Original source: The Papers of George Washington, Revolutionary War Series, vol. 18, 1 November 1778 – 14 January 1779, ed. Edward G. Lengel. Charlottesville: University of Virginia Press, 2008, pp. 234–235.]
- "Letter from François Lellorquis, Marquis de Malmady to Horatio Gates, Malmady, François Lellorquis, marquis de"., August 4, 1780, Colonial and State Records of North Carolina, Volume 14, Page 531
- Bayles, Richard Mather (1888). "History of Newport County, Rhode Island. From the year 1638 to the year 1887, including the settlement of its towns, and their subsequent progress". New York, L. E. Preston & Co.
