= Peter Horry =

American politician

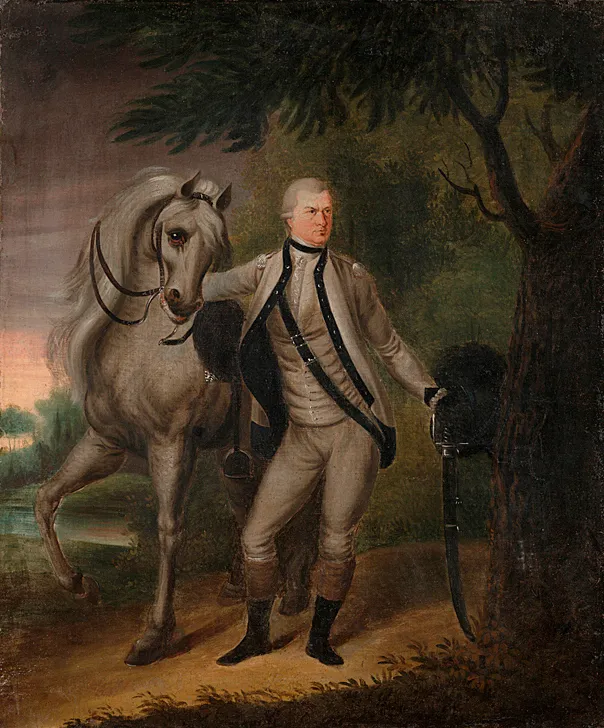

Member of the South Carolina House of Representatives
- In office 1782, 1792 – 1794

Member of the South Carolina Senate
- In office 1785–1787

Personal details
- Born: March 12, 1743/1744 Georgetown, Province of South Carolina
- Died: February 28, 1815 (aged 71-72) Columbia, South Carolina
- Resting place: Trinity Episcopal Cathedral Cemetery, Columbia, South Carolina
- Spouse: Margaret M. Guignard

Military service
- Allegiance: United States
- Branch/service: Continental Army; South Carolina Militia
- Years of service: 1775-1806
- Rank: Brigadier general
- Unit: 2nd South Carolina Regiment
- Commands: 5th South Carolina Regiment
- Battles/wars: American Revolutionary War; Battle of Sullivan's Island; Siege of Charleston

Peter Horry (March 12, 1743/1744 – 28 February, 1815) was an American planter who served as an officer in the southern theater of the American Revolutionary War. He served under the command of Francis Marion, waging a guerilla war against the British and Loyalist forces. Peter Horry was elected to public office, served in the state militia, and oversaw several plantations. He is the namesake of Horry County, South Carolina.

== Personal life ==
Horry was born and raised in the Prince George Winyah Parish (Georgetown, South Carolina and vicinity), as were both of his parents and all four of his grandparents. All eight of his great grandparents were French Huguenot refugees who were part of a two-wave migration, first moving from France to England and then moving from England to South Carolina. Horry's eight great grandparents fled France in the 1670s, and all of them arrived in Charles Town, Carolina in the early 1680s.

Taught to read and write at the Indigo Society school near his home in Georgetown, Peter Horry later served a harsh apprenticeship with a local merchant. By the late 1760s Horry had established a mercantile partnership in Georgetown, which he discontinued after inheriting 475 acres from his father to become a plantation owner. He presumably thrived in this new role, as he later purchased his brother's share of his father's estate, a rice plantation called Belle Isle. Eventually Horry owned three plantations on Winyah Bay and the Santee River, as well as land in Ninety Six District and a house in Columbia (later called the Horry-Guignard House). At the time of his death he owned as many as 116 slaves.

The 957-acre Dover estate at Winyah Bay was listed for sale for $14.75 million in 2023. According to the listing, Horry retired there after the war, and a house was built in the early 1800s. The 7910-square-foot main house is a recreation by Cornelia Sage, built in 1949 after a fire, the listing said.

== Military career ==
In June 1775, the Provincial Congress of South Carolina elected Horry as an officer in the 2nd regiment. On September 16, 1776, he was promoted to major of the 2nd Regiment, and in 1779 was promoted to lieutenant-colonel and assigned to the 5th Regiment. When the 1st, 2nd, 3rd, 5th and 6th Regiments were consolidated February 12, 1780, into three regiments he was placed upon the "supernumerary list" to await a vacancy in the rank of lieutenant-colonel in the Continental Line of South Carolina.

In July, 1780, all officers and men of the South Carolina Line not in the hands of the enemy or on parole were directed to report to General Gates' headquarters at Hillsboro, N. C. In accordance therewith Horry reported to Gates, but as he was without a command, Gates assigned him to duty with the militia of South Carolina. After the appointment of Lieutenant-Colonel Francis Marion, another officer of the South Carolina Line without a command—his regiment having been captured at the Fall of Charleston while he was on furlough—to be brigadier general of the lower brigade of the militia of South Carolina by Governor Rutledge, Horry became colonel of one of the militia regiments under Marion.

== Civilian service ==
He was elected to the South Carolina House of Representatives in 1782, representing Prince George Winyah Parish. He was then elected to the State Senate, serving from 1792 until 1794, and then elected back into the House from 1785 to 1787.

== Legacy ==
In 1801, Horry County, South Carolina was founded and named in honor of him. The Horry-Guignard House, where he lived, was added to the National Register of Historic Places in 1971. He was inducted into the South Carolina Hall of Fame in 2007 and in 2012 a sculpture of Horry was erected in Conway, South Carolina.
