= Samuel Polk =

American surveyor (1772–1827)

- Born: July 5, 1772; Mecklenburg County, North Carolina, British America
- Died: December 3, 1827 (aged 55); Columbia, Tennessee, U.S.
- Resting place: Greenwood Cemetery, Columbia, Tennessee, U.S.
- Occupations: Surveyor, Farmer
- Spouse: Jane Knox (m. 1794)
- Children: James; Jane; Lydia; Franklin; Marshall; John; Naomi; Ophelia; William; Samuel
- Parents: Ezekiel Polk (father); Mary Jane Winslow Wilson (mother)

Samuel Polk (July 5, 1772 – December 3, 1827) was an American surveyor and the father of U.S. President James K. Polk. His slaves included Elias Polk.

== Life ==
Samuel Polk was born in 1772 in Mecklenburg County, North Carolina. He was the son of Ezekiel Polk and Mary Jane Winslow Wilson. Polk married Jane Gracey Knox (1776–1852) on Christmas Day 1794 in Hopewell Church in Mecklenburg County. Jane was the daughter of Captain James Knox and Lydia (Gillespie) Knox. Their first child, James Knox Polk, was born on November 2 of the following year. Though Polk consented to naming the child after his father-in-law, he opposed having James baptized as Presbyterian, as he himself would have to admit his faith. During their marriage, the couple participated in debates with neighbors regarding the future of the United States, with the discussions often being held in front of James. Other children included: Jane Maria Polk, Lydia Eliza Polk, Franklin Ezekiel Polk, Marshall Tate Polk, John Lee Polk, Naomi Tate Polk, Ophelia Clarissa Polk, William Hawkins Polk and Samuel Washington Polk. The family moved from Mecklenburg County, North Carolina to Columbia, Maury County, Tennessee in 1806, where both Samuel and Jane died and were buried in the Greenwood Cemetery.
