= William Thomson (American soldier) =

American soldier

- Born: January 16, 1727; Province of Pennsylvania
- Died: November 22, 1796 (aged 69); Sweet Springs, West Virginia, U.S.
- Military career
- Allegiance: United States of America
- Branch: South Carolina State Troops, Continental Army
- Service years: 1775-1783
- Rank: Brevet General
- Commands: 3rd South Carolina Regiment, Orangeburgh District Regiment of South Carolina Militia

William Thomson (1727–1796) was a South Carolina patriot in the American Revolution. He was Colonel of the Orangeburgh District Regiment of Militia and commander of the 3rd South Carolina Regiment of Rangers.

== Early life ==
William Thomson was born on January 16, 1727, in Pennsylvania. He was related to Charles Thomson. As a boy, his parents brought him to South Carolina, where they settled along the west side of the Congaree River in Orangeburgh District.

== Career ==
He later served as sheriff of Orangeburgh and was elected to the First Provincial Congress in January and June 1775.

He was selected as colonel in early 1775 over the Orangeburgh District Regiment of the South Carolina militia. He was later commissioned as lieutenant colonel and commandant of the 3rd South Carolina Regiment of Rangers on June 18, 1775, and later promoted to colonel on May 16, 1776. He was promoted to brevet general on September 30, 1783.

He was involved in the following engagements:

- December 22, 1775, Battle of Great Cane Brake
- December 23–30, 1775, Snow Campaign
- June 28, 1776, Battle of Fort Moultrie
- 1776, Cherokee Expedition
- June 20, 1779, Battle of Stono Ferry
- September 16 to October 18, 1779, Siege of Savannah
- March 28 to May 12, 1780, Siege of Charleston

At the fall of Charleston on May 12, 1780, he was taken prisoner and was paroled until the end of the war. He returned to his estate at Belleville, South Carolina, where he continued the pursuit as an indigo planter. Because of poor health he moved to a medicinal springs in Virginia, where he died on November 22, 1796.

== 3rd South Carolina Regiment ==
The 3rd South Carolina Regiment was originally authorized on June 6, 1775, as the South Carolina Regiment of Horse (Rangers). When organized in the summer of 1775, it consisted of nine companies from western South Carolina. On November 12, 1775, it was re-designated the 3rd South Carolina Regiment. On July 24, 1776, it was placed under the Continental Army and placed under the Southern Department.
