= 3rd South Carolina Regiment =

3rd South Carolina Regiment (Rangers)
- Active: 1775–1781
- Country: United States
- Type: Ranger
- Part of: Continental Army
- Engagements: Savannah and Charleston

Commanders
- Notable commanders: Lt. Col./Col. William Thomson

The 3rd South Carolina Regiment was an infantry regiment of the South Carolina Line during the American Revolutionary War. Raised in the western part of South Carolina, the regiment fought in the Siege of Savannah and the Siege of Charleston, surrendering to British forces in the latter.

== History ==
The regiment was originally designated as the South Carolina Regiment of Horse Rangers and authorized on 6 June 1775 as part of the South Carolina State Troops. It was organized in the following months at Ninety Six among other places and ultimately consisted of nine companies recruited in the western part of the state. The Regiment of Horse Rangers was redesignated as the 3rd South Carolina Regiment on 12 November 1775, and joined the Southern Department of the Continental Army on 24 July 1776. Simultaneously, the Independent Company of Captain Ezekiel Polk was absorbed into the regiment as its 10th Company.

== Officers ==
The regiment had one commander, Lieutenant Colonel/Colonel William Thomson, although Major James Mayson served as the initial highest-ranking member of the regiment. Ely Kershaw, William Cattell, James Mayson, and William Henderson served as Lieutenant Colonels. Known Majors include Lewis Golsan Jr., Charles S. Myddleton (not to be confused with Hugh T. Middleton), Thomas Pearman, John Purvis, unknown Speers, and Samuel Wise. Regimental Adjutants included John Eason, John Knapp, Merry McGuire, and John Purvis.

== Engagements ==
The 3rd South Carolina participated in the First Siege of Charleston in 1775–1776, and became part of the 1st South Carolina Brigade on 23 November. It fought in engagements in the Piedmont and transferred to the 2nd South Carolina Brigade on 26 August 1778. Detachments of the regiment served in the Cherokee War of 1776 and in the expeditions to Florida during 1777 and 1778. The 3rd South Carolina was relieved from the latter on 3 January 1779 and became part of the South Carolina Brigade on 1 February.

The regiment fought in the Siege of Savannah from 16 September 1779 to 18 October 1779 and was reduced back to nine companies on 11 February 1780. Between March and May it participated in the Siege of Charleston, and surrendered to the British Army there on 12 May 1780, together with the rest of the Southern Department. The regiment was disbanded on 1 January 1781.

Known engagements:

- 12 July 1775, Fort Charlotte
- 18 September 1775, Sullivan's Island
- 31 October 1775, Congaree River
- 3 November 1775, Mine Creek
- 19–21 November 1775, Siege of Ninety-Six
- 22 December 1775, Battle of Great Cane Brake
- 23–30 December 1775, Snow Campaign
- 26 June 1776, Cherokee Indian Towns
- 28 June 1776, Battle of Fort Moultrie/Sullivan's Island
- 28 June 1776. Breach Inlet Naval Battle
- 15 July 1776, Battle of Lindley's Fort
- 1 August 1776, Seneca Town
- 8–11 August 1776, Cherokee Towns
- 10 August 1776, Tugaloo River
- 12 August 1776, The Ring Fight
- 12 August 1776, Tamassee
- September 1776, St. Augustine Expedition, Florida
- 14 October 1776, Altamaha River, Georgia
- 23 February – 15 Mar. 1777, Fort McIntosh, Georgia
- 29 December 1778, Siege of Savannah, Georgia
- 6–10 January 1779, Fort Morris, Georgia
- 3 February 1779, Battle of Beaufort/Port Royal Island
- 3 March 1779, Battle of Briar/Brier Creek, Georgia
- April – July 1779, Prevost's March
- 3 May 1779, Coosawhatchie
- 20 June 1779, Battle of Stono Ferry
- 16 September – 18 Oct. 1779, Siege of Savannah, Georgia
- 12 March 1780, Two Sisters' Ferry
- 28 March – 12 May 1780, Siege of Charleston

== See also ==
- South Carolina Line: 1st, 2nd, 4th, 5th, 6th Regiments
- List of South Carolina militia units in the American Revolution
