= 4th South Carolina Regiment =

South Carolina Regiment

4th South Carolina Regiment (Infantry)
- Active: 1775-1783
- Allegiance: South Carolina, Continental Congress of the United States
- Type: Infantry
- Part of: South Carolina Line
- Engagements: Siege of Savannah, Siege of Charleston

Commanders
- Notable commanders: LtCol/Col Owen Roberts; Col Barnard Beekman

The 4th South Carolina Regiment was raised on November 13, 1775, at Charleston, South Carolina, for service with the South Carolina Troops and later became part of Continental Army.

== Officers ==
The commanders of the 4th Regiment were:

- Lt. Col./Col. Owen Roberts (1775-1779), killed at the Battle of Stono Ferry
- Col. Barnard Beeckman (1778-1781)

== History ==
The major events in the history of the 4th South Carolina Regiment (Infantry) included:

- November 14, 1775, authorized in the South Carolina Provincial Troops as the 4th South Carolina Regiment.
- November 20 to December 18, 1775, organized at Charleston to consist of three companies from the greater Charleston area.
- June 18, 1776, adopted into the Continental Army and assigned to the Southern Department.
- October 18, 1776, expansion of the unit included six companies (Beaufort and Georgetown Independent Companies of Artillery concurrently redesignated as the 4th and 5th Companies).
- October 18, 1776, expanded to six companies (Beaufort and Georgetown Independent Companies of Artillery concurrently re-designated as the 4th and 5th Companies)
- May 12, 1780, captured at Charleston by the British Army.
- January 1, 1781, disbanded

== Engagements ==
The unit was engaged in the following battles, skirmishes and sieges:

- June 28, 1776, Battle of Fort Moultrie/Sullivan's Island
- January 6-10, 1779, Fort Morris, Georgia
- February 1, 1779, Fort Lyttelton
- February 3, 1779, Battle of Beaufort/Port Royal Island
- February 21, 1779, Georgetown
- March 3, 1779, Battle of Briar Creek, Georgia
- March 6, 1779, Georgetown
- April 29, 1779, Purrysburg
- May 11, 1779, Charleston Neck
- June 20, 1779, Battle of Stono Ferry
- September 16 - Oct. 18, 1779, Siege of Savannah, Georgia
- December 29, 1779, Siege of Savannah, Georgia
- March 28 - May 12, 1780, Siege of Charleston

== See also ==
- South Carolina Line: 1st, 2nd, 3rd, 4th, 5th, 6th Regiments
- List of South Carolina militia units in the American Revolution
