= North Carolina Light Dragoons Regiment =

- Active: 1775–1779 then 1779-1781 as State Troops
- Allegiance: North Carolina, Continental Congress of the United States
- Type: Dragoon
- Part of: State Troops, Continental Army
- Engagements: Brandywine and Germantown

Commanders
- Notable commanders: Col. François DeMalmedy

The North Carolina Light Dragoons Regiment was raised on April 13, 1775 at Wilmington, North Carolina, first as provincial troops, then as state troops, then for service with the Continental Army, and finally returned as a State Troop Regiment. On April 16, 1776, the General Assembly authorized the creation of three companies of NC Light Dragoons. These are first considered to be Provincial Troops then State Troops. On March 7, 1777, these companies were placed on the North Carolina Continental Line. All companies of North Carolina Light Dragoons were removed from the Continental Line on January 1, 1779 and ordered to disband. The North Carolina General Assembly decided to retain these units, but it took them several months to figure out how best to employ them. Between February and June of 1779, they were assembled into a new Regiment of State Troops under ex-Continental Col. François Malmédy, who had marched south with Major General Benjamin Lincoln in late 1778.

== Organization ==
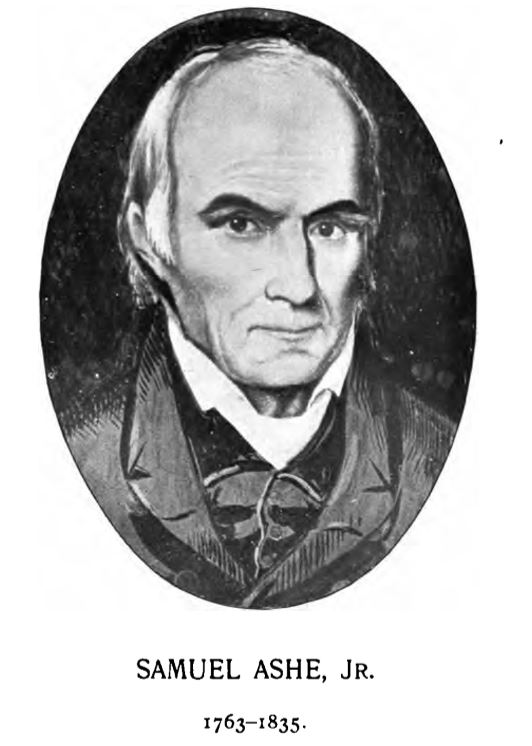
Captain Samuel Ash, Jr.

The regiment included the following companies:

- 1st Company, commanders: John Dickerson until February 1777; Captain Samuel Ashe, Jr., approved March 7, 1777
- 2nd Company, commander: Captain Martin Phifer, approved in 1777
- 3rd Company, commander: Captain James Jones, resigned October 25, 1776; Captain Cosmo Medici, approved in 1777
- 4th Company, commander: Captain John Brown, approved in June 1778 when company was created

The regiment was disbanded on January 1, 1779 at Halifax, North Carolina and Fort Pitt. Many considered this new Regiment to be Militia, while most considered them to be State Troops. The unit was simply called the North Carolina Light Dragoons Regiment. The regiment saw action at the Battle of Brandywine and the Battle of Germantown.

The North Carolina General Assembly decided to retain these units, but it took them several months to figure out how best to employ them. Between February and June of 1779, they were assembled into a new Regiment of State Troops under ex-Continental Col. François Malmédy, who had marched south with Major General Benjamin Lincoln in late 1778. The regiment was disbanded in 1781, not long after Col. François Malmédy was killed in a duel.

== Bibliography ==
- Bibliography of the Continental Army in North Carolina compiled by the United States Army Center of Military History
- Lewis, J.D.; North Carolina in the American Revolution; NC Light Dragoons
- payroll records during this period, RHSearch.com,
- Davis, Charles L.; A Brief History of the North Carolina Troops on the Continental Establishment in the War of the Revolution with a Register of Officers of the Same, published in 1896, Link, accessed Jan 30, 2019
