= 5th South Carolina Regiment =

- Active: 1776–1780
- Allegiance: Continental Congress of the United States
- Type: Infantry
- Part of: South Carolina Line
- Engagements: Savannah

Commanders
- Notable commanders: Col. Isaac Huger; Col John Stewart; LtCol Peter Horry

The 5th South Carolina Regiment (1st Rifle Regiment) was raised on February 22, 1776, at Charleston, South Carolina, for service with the South Carolina Troops and later assigned to the Continental Army. The regiment saw action at the Siege of Savannah. The regiment was merged into the 1st South Carolina Regiment on February 11, 1780.

== History ==
The following events occurred in the history of this unit:

- February 22, 1776, authorized in the South Carolina Provincial Troops
- Spring 1776, organized at Charleston to consist of seven companies from eastern and northern South Carolina.
- March 25, 1776, adopted into the Continental Army and assigned to the Southern Department
- November 23, 1776, assigned to the 2nd South Carolina Brigade, an element of the Southern Department.
- January 3, 1779, relieved from the 2nd South Carolina Brigade.
- February 1, 1779, assigned to the South Carolina Brigade, an element of the Southern Department
- May 1, 1779, relieved from the South Carolina Brigade.
- June 15, 1779, assigned to McIntosh's Brigade, an element of the Southern Department.
- September 14, 1779, relieved from McIntosh's Brigade
- February 11, 1780, consolidated with the 1st South Carolina Regiment

== Officers ==
The commanders of this unit were:

- Col. Isaac Huger
- Col. John Stewart
- Lt. Col. Peter Horry

== Engagements ==
This unit was involved in the following battles, skirmishes and sieges:

- June 28, 1776, Fort Moultrie
- August 1, 1776, Seneca Town
- August 8-11, 1776, Cherokee Towns
- December 29, 1778, Siege of Savannah, Georgia
- February 3, 1779, Port Royal Island
- May 3, 1779, Coosawhatchie
- May 11, 1779, Charleston Neck
- June 20, 1779 Battle of Stono Ferry
- September 16 - Oct. 18, 1779, Siege of Savannah, Georgia

== See also ==
- List of South Carolina militia units in the American Revolution
- South Carolina Line: 1st, 2nd, 3rd, 4th, 5th, 6th Regiments
