= 1st South Carolina Regiment =

- Active: June 6, 1775 – November 15, 1783
- Allegiance: South Carolina State Troops, Continental Congress of the United States
- Type: Infantry
- Part of: South Carolina Line
- Engagements: Savannah, Florida (1778), Caribbean (1778), Savannah, Charleston (1775-1776, 1780)

Commanders
- Notable commanders: Col. Christopher Gadsden; Col. Charles C. Pinckney; Col. Isaac Huger

The 1st South Carolina Regiment was authorized on June 6, 1775, at Charleston, South Carolina, for infantry service with the South Carolina State Troops. On November 4, 1775, the unit was adopted into the Continental Army and on February 27, 1776 was assigned to the Southern Department. The regiment saw action at the Siege of Savannah and the Siege of Charleston. The British Army captured the regiment at Charleston on May 12, 1780, together with the rest of the Southern Department.

== Officers ==
- Lt Col Isaac Huger (original officer)
- Col. Christopher Gadsden
- Col. Charles Cotesworth Pinckney

== History ==
The unit timeline includes the following events:

- June 6, 1775, authorized as South Carolina State Troops
- Summer of 1775, organized in Charleston, South Carolina to include 10 companies from eastern South Carolina
- November 4, 1775, adopted into the Continental Army
- February 27, 1776, assigned to the Southern Department
- November 23, 1776, assigned to the 1st South Carolina Brigade of the Southern Department
- January 3, 1779, relieved from the 1st South Carolina Brigade
- February 1, 1779, assigned to the South Carolina Brigade of the Southern Department
- February 11, 1780, consolidated with the 5th South Carolina Regiment
- May 12, 1780, captured by the British Army in the Siege of Charleston
- December 11, 1782, reorganized at Charleston to consist of three companies
- May 1-14, 1783, furloughed at Charleston
- November 15, 1783, disbanded

== Engagements ==
The unit was involved in the following battles, skirmishes and sieges:

- July 9, 1775, Bloody Point
- September 15, 1775, Fort Johnson
- November 11–12, 1775, Hog Island Channel
- June 28, 1776, Fort Moultrie/Sullivan's Island
- March 7, 1778, Battle of Barbados
- February 3, 1779, Battle of Beaufort/Port Royal Island
- March 3, 1779, Battle of Briar/Brier Creek, Georgia
- May 1779, Prevost's March on Charleston
- June 20, 1779, Battle of Stono Ferry
- September 16 – October 18, 1779, Siege of Savannah, Georgia
- March 28 – May 12, 1780, Siege of Charleston
- March 29–30, 1780, Gibbes' Plantation
- April 8, 1780, Sullivan's Island
- April 12, 1780, Sullivan's Island
- April 25, 1780, Sullivan's Island
- May 2, 1780, Haddrell's Point
- May 7, 1780, Fort Moultrie

== See also ==
- South Carolina Line: 1st, 2nd, 3rd, 4th, 5th, 6th Regiments
- List of South Carolina militia units in the American Revolution
- Southern theater of the American Revolutionary War
