= 2nd South Carolina Regiment =

- Active: 1775-1783
- Country: United States
- Allegiance: South Carolina
- Branch: Continental Army
- Type: Regiment
- Role: Infantry
- Part of: South Carolina Line
- Engagements: Siege of Savannah; Siege of Charleston Battle of Sullivan's Island

Commanders
- Notable commanders: Col. William Moultrie; Col. Isaac Motte; Lt. Col. Francis Marion

The 2nd South Carolina Regiment was raised on June 6, 1775, at Charleston, South Carolina, for service with the Continental Army.

== History ==
At organization the regiment consisted of 10 companies from eastern South Carolina and was part of the South Carolina State Troops. On November 4, 1775, the regiment was adopted by the Continental Army, and on February 27, 1776, it was assigned to the Southern Department. On November 23, 1776, the regiment was assigned to the 2nd South Carolina Brigade, Southern Department, and was relieved on 26 August 1778 and placed in the 1st South Carolina Brigade, and again moved to McIntosh's Brigade on June 15, 1779, and then moved to Huger's Brigade on September 14, 1779. On February 11, 1780, it was consolidated with the 6th South Carolina Regiment.

It was the main unit involved in the successful defense of Fort Moultrie at the Battle of Sullivan's Island, which prevented Charleston from being attacked by British forces for the next several years. When the flag designed by the fort's commander, Colonel William Moultrie, was shot down, one of the regiment, William Jasper, grabbed it and held it aloft, rallying the troops until a stand could be provided.

This battle was vital to the entire war, and became symbolic of liberty in South Carolina. Its date is known as Carolina Day in the state, and the palmetto logs the regiment used for the fortress were added to the Moultrie Flag used to rally the troops, creating the Flag of South Carolina.

The regiment saw action at the Siege of Savannah, where elements from the British 60th Royal Americans captured their regimental Colour, and the Siege of Charleston. The regiment was captured by the British Army at Charleston on May 12, 1780, together with the rest of the Southern Department. The regiment was disbanded on November 15, 1783.

== See also ==
- South Carolina Line: 1st, 2nd, 3rd, 4th, 5th, 6th Regiments
- List of South Carolina militia units in the American Revolution
