= Isaac Huger =

American politician

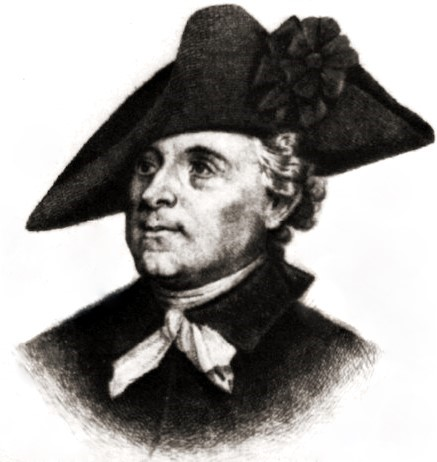
- Born: March 19, 1743; Berkeley County, South Carolina, British America
- Died: October 17, 1797 (aged 54); Charleston, South Carolina, U.S.
- Military career
- Allegiance: United States
- Branch: Continental Army
- Rank: Brigadier general
- Unit: 1st South Carolina Regiment
- Commands: 5th South Carolina Regiment
- Conflicts: American Revolutionary War; Battle of Stono Ferry; Siege of Savannah; Siege of Charleston; Battle of Guilford Courthouse; Battle of Hobkirk's Hill

Isaac Huger (March 19, 1743 – October 17, 1797) was an American planter and Continental Army general during the American Revolutionary War.

== Life and work ==
Isaac Huger was born at the "Limerick" slave plantation on the Cooper River, the second son of Huguenot merchant and planter Daniel and Mary Cordes Huger. The wealth of his family afforded young Isaac an education in Europe, along with his brothers. Huger began his military career by serving as an officer in Colonel Thomas Middleton's Provincial South Carolina Regiment during the expedition against the Cherokees in 1761.

While serving as a representative for the parishes of St. Philip and St. Michael in the First Provincial Congress of South Carolina, Huger was appointed a lieutenant colonel in the South Carolina militia and later commissioned a lieutenant colonel in the 1st South Carolina Regiment on June 17, 1775. He was promoted to colonel on September 16, 1776, and appointed commander of the 5th South Carolina Regiment. On January 9, 1779, he was promoted to the rank of brigadier general in the Continental Army. It was at his home, near Beaufort, that Lafayette, in 1777, at age 19, landed in America to help against the British. Lafayette would become lifelong friend with Huger and Huger's son, who would repay that friendship by trying to rescue Lafayette from Austrian prison twenty years later.

Brigadier General Huger fought and was wounded at the Battle of Stono Ferry on June 20, 1779, and commanded the South Carolina and Georgia militia during the Siege of Savannah on October 9, 1779.

During the siege of Charleston in the spring of 1780, he was placed in command of the light horse and militia outside the city. A surprise attack by Lieutenant Colonel Banastre Tarleton's forces routed and dispersed Huger's troops at Monck's Corner on the morning of April 14, 1780. Illness kept Huger from capture with the surrender of Charleston, and he later rejoined the Southern army under Major General Horatio Gates in North Carolina.

He was present when Major General Nathanael Greene took command of the Southern Department in Charlotte later in December. Greene detached his light forces to the western parts of South Carolina and moved his regulars to a camp in the Cheraws, with Huger as his second-in-command. After the brilliant American victory at Cowpens, Huger was entrusted by Greene to lead the command posted in the Cheraws to rejoin the detached light forces in North Carolina. At the Battle of Guilford Courthouse on March 15, 1781, he commanded a brigade of Virginia Continental regiments and was slightly wounded in action. Commanding the same brigade at the Battle of Hobkirk's Hill on April 25, Huger initially stood his ground after the unanticipated withdrawal of the right wing of the American line. With the retreat of the British from the interior to Charleston, General Huger was reunited with his family and returned to his home, ending his combative service.

Isaac Huger represented St. George Dorchester in the Jacksonborough Assembly in January 1782 and served in the legislature until his election as Sheriff of Charleston District in 1785. Familial ties led to his appointment as the first federal marshal for South Carolina in 1789, a position which he held for five years. Isaac Huger married Elizabeth Chalmers on March 23, 1762, and was the father of eight children. He died in Charleston.
