= Departments of the Continental Army =

In the American Revolutionary War units of the Continental Army were assigned to any one of seven regional or territorial departments to decentralize their command and administration. This was necessary because the regiment was the largest permanent unit in the Continental Army. A superior headquarters, above regiment, was needed if more than a few regiments were stationed in the same department. Although brigades, divisions, and field armies existed, they were temporary units which did not necessarily include all the units assigned to a department. Nor did field armies include establishments of the staff, such as magazines (supply depots) of the Quartermaster General's Department, or hospitals of the Hospital Department. The militia in a department was usually at the disposal of the department commander.

== Departmental organization ==
The Continental troops in a department constituted its garrison. If the garrison was sufficiently large, the units might be assembled into a field army. In this case the commander of the territorial department and the commander of the field army would be one and the same officer. Thus, the commanding general of the Northern Department was also commanding general of the Northern Army, and the commanding general of the Southern Department was also commanding general of the Southern Army. Armies did not, however, invariably receive a geographical designation. Because the field army under Washington's personal command contained the majority of Continental Army units it was designated the Main Army. Each department had a semi-autonomous commanding officer, usually a commanding general, under the overall command of Washington as General and Commander-in-Chief. The Continental Congress dealt with and through the department commanders.

=== Appointment of department commanders ===
Throughout the war, the Continental Congress retained exclusive authority to appoint or remove department commanders. In practice, when an urgent need arose, a temporary commander was just as frequently appointed by George Washington or the executive power of one of the states, pending the approval of the Continental Congress. Many of these temporary department commanders were then confirmed and formally appointed by the Congress. This practice, along with control of the Continental Army and Navy through the war and marine committees of the Continental Congress, established the precedent for civil control of military affairs later embodied in the Articles of Confederation and the United States Constitution.

=== Relations between the departments and the states ===
The department commanders and their staffs also worked directly with the governments of the states within their department. At first these were the ad hoc provisional governments developed in 1774 and 1775, but the practice continued after 1776 when the states replaced their Provincial Congresses and Conventions with permanent governments operating under written constitutions. Ordinarily departments were commanded by major generals. Washington as a full general was the ranking general officer in the Continental Army throughout the war.

== Departments ==
In general there were seven territorial departments, although their boundaries were subject to change and they were not all in existence throughout the war.

=== Canadian Department ===
The establishment of the Canadian Department reflected the aspirations of the Continental Congress and some Americans to annex the British province of Quebec, then often referred to as "Canada", but the effort was ultimately unsuccessful. Although the Americans captured Montreal in November 1775, and established their headquarters at Château Ramezay, the region was never entirely under the control of the Continental Army. The Canadian Department was formally established from the New York Department on January 17, 1776. After the Invasion of Canada failed, all troops were withdrawn to Fort Ticonderoga, New York. The Canadian Department was officially discontinued on July 8, 1776.

=== Eastern Department ===
The Eastern Department was formed around those states that had originally sent troops to support the Siege of Boston, and in that sense it even existed before the Continental Army. This was essentially the New England department, and included the states of New Hampshire, Massachusetts (including the present state of Maine), Rhode Island, and Connecticut. For the first year of the war, the field army associated with this department, under the command of General Washington, was variously designated as the Continental Army, Grand Army, or Main Army. The Eastern Department was formally established on April 4, 1776 when the Main Army under Washington moved from Boston to New York City. Important operations in this department included the Siege of Boston in 1775–1776 and the Battle of Rhode Island in 1779. The department was discontinued in November 1779.

=== Northern Department ===
The predecessor of the Northern Department was the New York Department, which was established on June 25, 1775. This department was sometimes described as the Separate Department and the troops stationed in it were known as the Separate Army. The original New York Department was coextensive with the Province of New York. The department's boundaries were extended to include Canada in the initial phase of the Invasion of Canada, but Canada was established as a separate department on January 17, 1776. When the Middle Department was created on February 27, 1776 the New York Department was merged into it. The Middle Department, as originally organized, included all of the colonies of New York, New Jersey, Pennsylvania, Delaware, and Maryland. The inclusion of New York in the Middle Department continued for less than two months, however. In April 1776 the Main Army moved from Boston to New York City and Washington assumed command of the Middle Department. The Northern Department was formally established from the Middle Department on April 14, 1776. The reorganized Northern Department included only that portion of the colony of New York north of the Hudson Highlands, and the present state of Vermont. The field army associated with the Northern Department was known as the Northern Army. Operations in this department did not end with Saratoga. Fighting continued in the Northern Department until the end of the war. The department was discontinued upon the death of its last commander, General Alexander, at Albany on January 15, 1783.

=== Highlands Department ===
The Highlands Department was the smallest in area. Strictly speaking, it was part of the Middle Department, but because of its importance it was virtually a separate department. The Highlands Department was formed around the defenses on the Hudson River about 50 miles (80 km) north of New York City, where the Appalachians and the Hudson intersect. After the British occupied New York City in 1776 the defenses just north of there became critically important. The presence of British naval forces at New York emphasized the importance of the Hudson River, and both sides in the war recognized the importance of controlling that waterway. The Americans created fortifications, including West Point with its chain across the river. Washington assigned Continental troops under General Heath to the Highlands on November 12, 1776 and there was a Continental Army garrison in the Highlands from then until the end of the war. Heath's assignment thus created a de facto military department. The British sought to gain control with the Saratoga campaign in 1777, and frequently raided into the southern reaches of the department to interfere with the movement of military goods and personnel. One of the most notable incidents in the history of this department was the defection of Benedict Arnold in September 1780.

=== Middle Department ===
The Middle Department was established on February 27, 1776. Originally it included all of the colonies of New York, New Jersey, Pennsylvania, Delaware, and Maryland. In April 1776, the Main Army moved from Boston to New York, and became the field army associated with the Middle Department for the remainder of the war. On April 14, 1776 that portion of New York north of the Hudson Highlands, and the present state of Vermont were separated from the Middle Department and organized as the Northern Department. The Middle Department then comprised the Hudson Highlands in the state of New York, the rest of New York south of the Highlands, and the states of New Jersey, Pennsylvania, Delaware, and Maryland.

The term Main Army had come into use during the Siege of Boston, because the majority of Continental Army regiments were assigned to it. The term was retained throughout the war. Most units in the Middle Department were assigned to the Main Army, under George Washington, or to the Highlands Department, which was under Washington's close supervision. A few regiments and independent companies were assigned to the Middle Department from time to time, but were not assigned to Washington's army or to the Highlands. These units were simply said to have been assigned to the Middle Department.

Some of the Continental Army's most important campaigns were fought in this department. These included the New York campaign and the New Jersey campaign which ended with the battles of Trenton and Princeton. The Philadelphia campaign was fought in this department, after which the Continental Army went into winter quarters at Valley Forge. In 1778 this department was the scene of the Monmouth campaign. After Monmouth, on June 28, 1778, major military operations in the United States shifted to the Southern Department. The department existed until the close of the war. It was the scene of one of the war's last episodes when the British Army evacuated New York City on November 25, 1783.

=== Western Department ===
The Western Department covered the frontier territories west and northwest of Virginia and Pennsylvania, including the present states of Ohio, Indiana, Illinois, Michigan, and Wisconsin. It extended from Pittsburgh all the way to the Illinois country and as far north as the southern peninsula of Michigan. The department was established in 1777. Its first commander was Edward Hand. George Rogers Clark's Illinois campaign of 1779 was one of the most notable operations in this department. This department was the only one to remain after the war. The last elements of the Continental Army, stationed at Fort Pitt, were kept to guard the western frontier outposts.

=== Southern Department ===
The Southern Department was formally established on February 27, 1776. The department included Virginia, North Carolina, South Carolina, and Georgia and the western frontiers of those colonies, from which were created the present states of West Virginia, Kentucky, Tennessee, Alabama, and Mississippi. The field army associated with this department was known as the Southern Army. The Southern Department was the most independent of the commands due to geography and the need for year-round operations. Most of the territorial departments to the north of this department suspended offensive operations for the winter and early spring. The Southern Department was also the only one in which the troops assigned were destroyed twice. The first time was at the surrender of Charleston on May 12, 1780. The second was at the Battle of Camden on August 16, 1780. Despite these two catastrophic defeats, however, this department was the location of the Siege of Yorktown, in 1781, which effectively decided the outcome of the war. Important events in the Southern Department after Yorktown were the evacuation of Savannah and Charleston in July and December 1782. The Southern Department existed until the close of the war.

== List of department commanders ==
Department	Commander	Date of appointment
Canadian	Richard Montgomery	December 9, 1775
Canadian	David Wooster	December 31, 1775 (acting)
Canadian	Charles Lee	February 17, 1776 (declined)
Canadian	John Thomas	March 6, 1776
Canadian	John Sullivan	June 1, 1776
Canadian	Horatio Gates	June 17, 1776
Eastern	George Washington	June 16, 1775
Eastern	Artemas Ward	April 4, 1776
Eastern	William Heath	March 20, 1777
Eastern	Horatio Gates	November 7, 1778
Northern	Philip Schuyler	June 25, 1775
Northern	Horatio Gates	August 19, 1777
Northern	John Stark	April 17, 1778
Northern	Edward Hand	October 19, 1778
Northern	James Clinton	November 20, 1778
Northern	John Stark	June 25, 1781
Northern	Lord Stirling	October 15, 1781
Northern	John Stark	November 21, 1781
Northern	Lord Stirling	August 29, 1782
Highlands	William Heath	November 12, 1776
Highlands	Alexander McDougall	December 21, 1776
Highlands	Israel Putnam	May 12, 1777
Highlands	Alexander McDougall	March 16, 1778
Highlands	Horatio Gates	May 20, 1778
Highlands	Alexander McDougall	November 24, 1778
Highlands	William Heath	November 27, 1779
Highlands	Robert Howe	February 21, 1780 (acting)
Highlands	Alexander McDougall	June 21, 1780
Highlands	Benedict Arnold	August 3, 1780
Highlands	George Washington	September 25, 1780 (acting)
Highlands	Alexander McDougall	September 28, 1780
Highlands	Nathanael Greene	October 5, 1780
Highlands	William Heath	October 17, 1780
Highlands	John Paterson	May 11, 1781 (acting)
Highlands	Alexander McDougall	June 24, 1781
Highlands	William Heath	January 18, 1782
Highlands	Henry Knox	August 24, 1782
Middle	George Washington	February 27, 1776
Western	Edward Hand	April 10, 1777
Western	Lachlan McIntosh	May 26, 1778
Western	Daniel Brodhead	March 5, 1779
Western	William Irvine	September 24, 1781
Southern	Charles Lee	March 1, 1776
Southern	James Moore	September 9, 1776
Southern	Robert Howe	April 15, 1777
Southern	Benjamin Lincoln	September 25, 1778
Southern	Horatio Gates	June 13, 1780
Southern	Nathanael Greene	October 31, 1780
Source: Wright, Robert K. Continental Army, Appendix B, p. 431 (unless otherwise noted)
