= Battle of Stono Ferry =

1779 battle of the American Revolutionary War

- Part of the American Revolutionary War
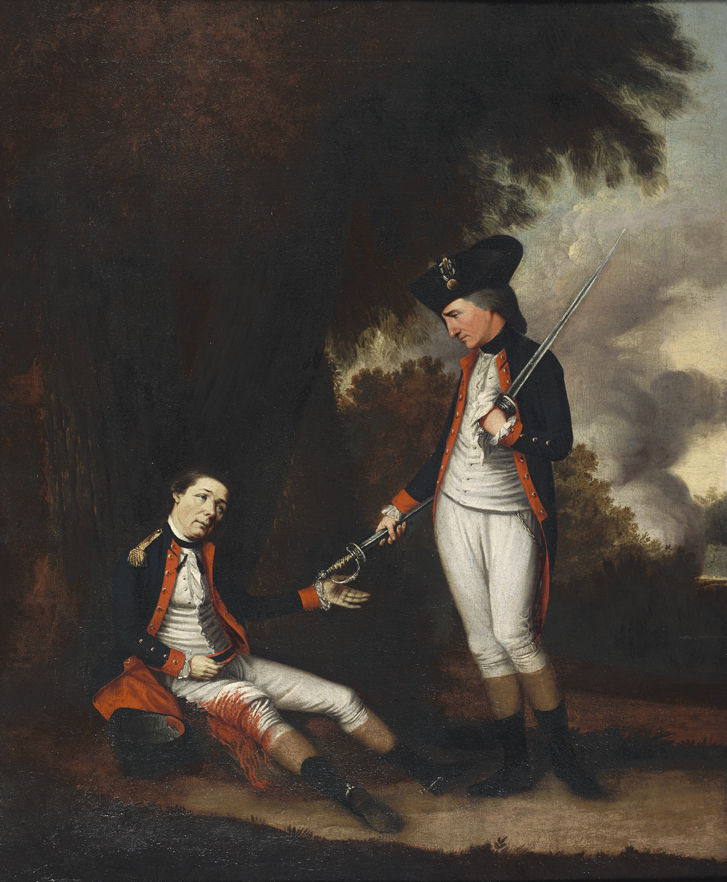
- 1779–1812 painting of the death of an American colonel at the battle
Date	June 20, 1779
Location	Charleston County, near present day Rantowles, South Carolina 32°45′25.33″N 80°8′2.16″W
Result	British victory

Belligerents
United States	Great Britain

Commanders and leaders
Benjamin Lincoln	John Maitland

Strength
1,500 militia 6 artillery pieces	900 infantry

Casualties and losses
34 killed 113 wounded 155 missing	26 killed 93 wounded 1 missing

The Battle of Stono Ferry was an American Revolutionary War battle, fought on June 20, 1779, near Charleston, South Carolina. The rear guard from a British expedition retreating from an aborted attempt to take Charleston held off an assault by militia forces under American General Benjamin Lincoln.

== Background ==
The first action in Britain's campaign to regain control of the revolted southern colonies was Admiral Peter Parker and General Henry Clinton's attempt to capture Charles Town (now Charleston), South Carolina in June 1776. The unplanned attack was stymied by failure to capture a fort on Sullivan's Island.

In December 1778, however, Savannah was captured and Charleston again exposed to danger. At the time, it was the site of the Continental Army's southern command under General Benjamin Lincoln. The British garrison at Savannah was about the same size as his own. Throughout the early months of 1779, Lincoln was reinforced by local militia as well as militia from North Carolina and Georgia. From a base at Purrysburg, South Carolina, Lincoln directed these forces to monitor key points on the Savannah River between the coast and Augusta, Georgia, which fell into British hands in late January. This buildup of forces prompted the British to withdraw their force from Augusta back to Ebenezer, Georgia, across the river from Purrysburg. During these maneuvers a Loyalist force was defeated in the Battle of Kettle Creek, and a North Carolina militia force was defeated in the Battle of Brier Creek.

By mid-April Lincoln felt strong enough to move in force with the goal of tightening the cordon around Savannah, cutting the British off from local resources. He marched from Purrysburg on April 23 toward Augusta. Lincoln was apparently unaware that the British supply situation was somewhat desperate, in part because American privateer activity had been successful in capturing British supply ships destined for Savannah and diverting them. His movement toward Augusta left the rich lands of coastal South Carolina protected by a minimal militia force. When British General Augustine Prevost learned of this movement, he decided to counterthrust against the militia forces at Purrysburg, marching 2,500 men out on April 29. The militia, about 1,000 men under the command of General William Moultrie, fell back toward Charleston rather than engaging Prevost, and Moultrie sent messengers to Lincoln warning him of the British movement. As Moultrie retreated, local men deserted his force in order to protect their homes and plantations. Prevost decided to pursue Moultrie, and chased him to the gates of Charleston.

On May 10, companies from the two forces skirmished near Ashley Ferry, about seven miles (11 km) from Charleston. Two days later Prevost intercepted a message from which he learned that Lincoln was rapidly marching back to Charleston, and decided to retreat. His army was slowed by having taken supplies en route, so he decided to leave a rear guard at Stono Ferry, between Johns Island and the mainland, removing most of his army to Savannah by boat on June 16. Prevost placed Lieutenant Colonel John Maitland in charge of the rear guard, which numbered about 900 men. A bridgehead was established on the north side of an area now known as New Cut Church Flats; this was meant to cover Stono Ferry. Three strong redoubts were built, circled by an abatis and manned by Highlanders from the 71st Foot, Hessians from the Regiment von Trumbach, and companies of Loyalists from North and South Carolina.

Lincoln, on his arrival in Charleston, decided to mount an attack on this outpost. Even though he commanded five to seven thousand men, he was only able to raise about 1,200 men, primarily from the poorly trained local militia, for the expedition. General Moultrie led a smaller secondary effort to the east against a small group of British soldiers on Johns Island.

Lincoln deployed his troops after a night march of eight miles (13 km) from the Ashley Ferry, located in the present village of Drayton Hall. Immediately upon their arrival at dawn, they began struggling through thick woods. The Americans advanced in two wings; General Jethro Sumner led his Carolina militia on the right, carrying two guns, while their right flank was covered by a company of light infantry, commanded by the Marquis de Malmady. Continental Army troops, under General Isaac Huger, made up the left wing; they carried four guns into battle. With Huger was a group of light infantry under John Henderson, and it was these troops who, shortly before sunrise, made first contact with the enemy.

== Battle ==
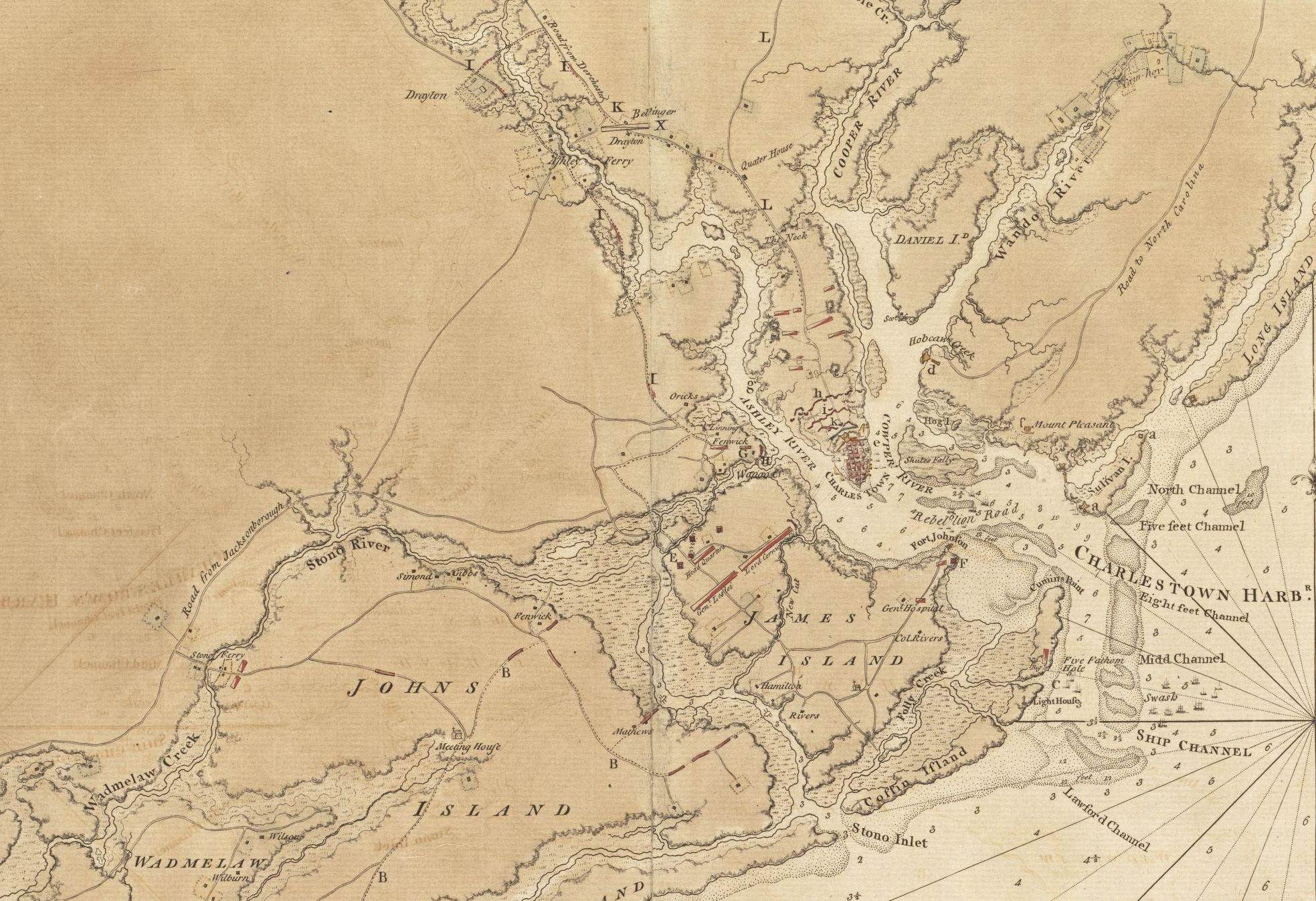
Detail from a 1780 map; Stono Ferry is to the left of Johns Island.

The battle began well for the Americans. They engaged the British positions with small arms and cannon fire for an hour, at which point they advanced to the abatis. Of the Highlanders, two companies resisted until only 11 men were left standing; a Hessian battalion finally broke. Here Maitland shifted his forces in an attempt to counter the larger threat posed by Huger's wing. The Hessians rallied and returned to the fight, and reserves were brought across the bridge. Lincoln chose this moment to order a withdrawal.

== Aftermath ==
The American loss in the battle was 34 killed, 113 wounded and 155 missing. Among the dead was Hugh Jackson, elder brother of future President Andrew Jackson, who was felled by heat and exhaustion. Hugh was severely wounded. The British casualties were 26 killed, 93 wounded and 1 missing.

Maitland had decided almost a week prior to the battle to withdraw from the site, but his movement was delayed by a lack of water transportation. He finally began moving on June 23 towards Beaufort, although with little prompting from Lincoln's attack.

The site of the battle is still visible today, at the end of South Carolina Route 318 near Rantowles.

== See also ==
- American Revolutionary War § War in the South. Places 'Battle of Stono Ferry' in overall sequence and strategic context.

== Sources ==
- O'Kelley, Patrick (2004). Nothing but Blood and Slaughter: Military Operations and Order of Battle of the Revolutionary War in the Carolinas, Volume One, 1771-1779. Press. ISBN 1-59113-458-7.
