= Snow Campaign =

Military conflict in the American revolutionary war

- Part of the Southern Theatre of the American Revolutionary War
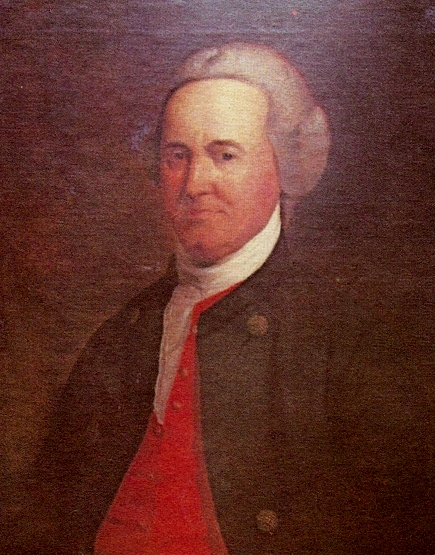
- General Richard Richardson
Date	November–December 1775; 250 years ago
Location	Appalachian Mountains, South Carolina
Result	Patriot victory

Belligerents
South Carolina (United States) North Carolina; Georgia Patriots	(Kingdom of Great Britain) South Carolina Loyalists

Commanders and leaders
Andrew Williamson; Richard Richardson; William Thomson	Patrick Cuningham; Thomas Fletchall

Strength
5,000 men (peak size)	400 men (peak size)

Casualties and losses
Unknown	6 killed, 130 captured

The Snow Campaign was one of the first major military operations of the American Revolutionary War in the southern colonies. An army of up to 3,000 Patriot militia under Colonel Richard Richardson marched against Loyalist recruiting centers in South Carolina, flushing them out and frustrating attempts by the Loyalists to organize. The Patriot expedition became known as the Snow Campaign due to heavy snowfall in the later stages of the campaign.

== Background ==
When the American Revolutionary War began in Massachusetts in April 1775, the free population of the Province of South Carolina was divided in its reaction. Many English coastal residents were either neutral or favored the rebellion, while significant numbers of backcountry residents, many of whom were German and Scottish immigrants, were opposed. Loyalist opposition in the backcountry was dominated by Thomas Fletchall, a vocal and active opponent of attempts to resist King and Parliament. By August 1775 tensions between Patriot and Loyalist in the province had escalated to the point where both sides had raised sizable militia forces.

Events were largely nonviolent for some time, although there were isolated instances of tarring and feathering, but tensions were high as the sides struggled for control of munitions. The Patriot Council of Safety in early August sent William Henry Drayton and Reverend William Tennent to Ninety Six to rally Patriot support and suppress growing Loyalist activities in the backcountry. Drayton was able to negotiate a tenuous treaty with Fletchall in September that only temporarily lessened tensions.

On September 15, Patriot militia seized Fort Johnson, the principal fortification overlooking the Charleston harbor. Governor William Campbell dissolved the provincial assembly, and fearing for his personal safety, fled to the Royal Navy sloop of war HMS Tamar. This left the Council of Safety in control of the provincial capital. The council began improving and expanding Charleston's coastal defenses, and there was a bloodless exchange of cannon fire between Patriot-controlled positions and Royal Navy ships in the harbor on November 11 and 12.

Matters also escalated when the Council of Safety began to organize a large-scale response to the seizure by Loyalists in October of a shipment of gunpowder and ammunition intended for the Cherokee. On November 8 the Council of Safety voted to send Colonel Richard Richardson, the commander of the Camden militia, to recover the shipment and arrest opposition leaders.

== Siege at Ninety Six ==
While Richardson gathered forces in Charleston, Major Andrew Williamson, who had been recruiting Patriots in the backcountry, learned of the gunpowder seizure. He arrived at Ninety Six early on November 19 with 560 men. Finding the small town to be not very defensible, he established a camp on John Savage's plantation, which was protected by an improvised stockade and provided a field of fire for the force's three swivel guns. Loyalist recruiting had been more successful: Williamson had learned that Captain Patrick Cuningham and Major Joseph Robinson were leading a large Loyalist force (estimated to number about 1,900) toward Ninety Six. In a war council that day, the Patriot leaders decided against marching out to face the Loyalists. The Loyalists arrived the next day, and surrounded the Patriot camp.

The leaders of the two factions were in the midst of negotiating an end to the standoff when two Patriot militiamen were seized by Loyalists outside the stockade. This set off a gunfight that lasted for about two hours, with modest casualties on both sides. For two more days the Patriots were besieged, during which there were occasional exchanges of gunfire. The siege ended after a parley in which the Patriot leaders were allowed to lead their forces out of the encampment in exchange for the surrender of their swivel guns, which were later returned. Both sides withdrew, the Loyalists across the Saluda River, and the Patriots down toward Charleston.

== Campaign against Loyalists ==
Colonel Richardson had in the meantime begun his march into the backcountry. By November 27 he reached the Congaree River with about 1,000 men. There he paused for several days, crossing the river and accumulating more militia companies into his force. When he left camp his force numbered about 1,500. By December 2 he had reached the Dutch Fork region (between the Saluda and Broad Rivers), gathering an ever-increasing number of militia along the way. There he halted at Evan McLauren's house, capturing several Loyalist officers in the area. The Loyalist forces, hampered by loss of leadership, were shrinking due to desertion. Those that remained organized retreated toward Cherokee lands at the headwaters of the Saluda River.

After issuing proclamations calling for the arrest of Loyalist officers and the return of the stolen munitions, Richardson resumed the march, his force grown to about 2,500. His force, still growing in size, marched toward the Enoree River, chasing down Loyalist leaders. On December 12 Richardson reported that his force numbered 3,000, and that he had captured Fletchall (who was found hiding in a cave) and several other Loyalist leaders. Fletchall's farm was searched and his private correspondence, including letters from Governor Campbell, were found.

At the Enoree Richardson was joined by militia forces under Williamson, as well as additional militia from North Carolina led by Colonels Griffith Rutherford and William Graham, swelling his force until it numbered between four and five thousand. These forces scoured the backcountry, and located a camp of 200 Loyalists on the Reedy River, several miles inside Cherokee territory. Richardson sent William Thomson with 1,300 troops to attack the camp. Thomson and the volunteers surprised the Loyalist camp on December 22, taking prisoners and seizing supplies, weapons, and ammunition. Following the Battle of Great Cane Brake, Thomson was able to control his men and avoid a slaughter: only five or six Loyalists were killed, and one of Thomson's men was wounded.

The next day, December 23, it began snowing as the Patriot forces made their way back toward the coast. The march home of the Patriot force was difficult because the force was unprepared for the weather. Richardson's army was dissolved, and most of the Patriots returned home. Richardson took 136 prisoners, who were dispatched to Charleston under guard on January 2, 1776.

== Aftermath ==
The Battle of Sullivan's Island, which followed the Snow Campaign

Governor Campbell continued to live aboard the Tamar, and considered making attacks on Fort Johnson after a third warship arrived. Patriot forces, however, were active in building up the harbor's defenses, and the British fleet left Charleston in January 1776. British forces led by Sir Henry Clinton made an unsuccessful attack on Charleston in June 1776; it was the last major British operation in the south until late 1778.

The campaign resulted in the elimination of large-scale Loyalist activity in the backcountry. Most of the prisoners taken were released by the Patriot leadership "as a conciliatory gesture to their backcountry friends". Some Loyalist leaders managed to escape capture. Notable among them was Thomas Brown, a South Carolina landowner who fled to East Florida. He was a leading force in the guerrilla war on the Georgia-Florida border, and his plans for retaking Georgia and eventually South Carolina were implemented by the British between 1778 and 1780.

== See also ==
- American Revolutionary War §Early Engagements. The ‘Snow Campaign’ placed in overall sequence and strategic context.
