= Thomas Fletchall =

Thomas Fletchall (1725–1789) was a colonel of the militia in South Carolina. He was also a coroner and justice of the peace. He was a loyalist during the American Revolutionary War, having proclaimed his loyalty to King George III. He fought against the patriots, also known as the rebels, with little success. He was captured and imprisoned twice during the war. The second time he was released it was with the understanding that he would not fight against the patriots. He left his plantation and went to Charleston for his and his family's safety. They boarded a ship for Jamaica, where Fletchall lived until his death in 1789.

== Personal life ==
Thomas Fletchall was born in 1725 in Maryland. He married Leah, with whom they had two sons and three daughters who were alive in 1780. Leah's sister Anne married Ambrose Mills, who became a colonel. Fletchall migrated to the Province of South Carolina with his family, and he established Fair Forest Plantation in the Fairforest Creek area in what is now Union, South Carolina.

== Military service and other positions ==
He served the community as a coroner and justice of the peace. He was a colonel of the militia for the Ninety Six Precinct, having been appointed by Lord Charles Greville Montagu, the governor of the province at that time. His regiment had more than 2,000 men.

When the American Revolutionary War began, Fletchall identified himself as a loyalist and would not sign the Articles of Association that supported fighting against The Crown to create an independent nation. When he made his first attempt at mustering loyalists on July 13, 1775, he gave the militiamen the option to sign their names to the document to break away from the British but none of the soldiers in the Upper Saluda Militia Regiment took the offer. Major Joseph Robinson or Fletchall drafted a proclamation in support of King George III, which the men supported.

On July 19, 1775, Fletchall wrote to Lord William Campbell, who was then the Governor of the Province of South Carolina, informing him about the "rebels" having seized Fort Charlotte. It was the first "overt act" in South Carolina during the Revolutionary War. Fletchall stated that he thought that within his district there were around 4,000 men loyal to the British government. The governor replied that he wanted Fletchall to ensure that Fort Charlotte was reinforced.

An influential man in the community, he recruited others to join his fight to support the British government, and to fight against those seeking independence. Other prominent loyalists were Robert and Patrick Cunningham, who were brothers, and Moses Kirkland. Together, the militia leaders controlled the area between the Broad and Saluda Rivers.

On August 17, 1775, William Henry Drayton and Rev. William Tennent met with Fletchall to encourage him to change sides and fight with the patriots, which Fletchall firmly rejected. In September 1775, Fletchall and Drayton marched toward one another, but they did not fight one another, perhaps neither side knowing how many more soldiers that Fletchall had than Drayton. Instead, they decided to work on a treaty. Around September 16, Fletchall signed the first Treaty of Ninety Six, which required both sides to be neutral. Fletchall had the support of four of his captains, but Robert Cunningham did not agree and would not sign the treaty. The colonel disbanded his regiment. Drayton did not honor the treaty. In November, Fletcall heard of Drayton's intention to fight and he reactivated the regiment.

Patrick Cunningham led the loyalists, who fought against 3,000 patriots, serving under Col. Richard Richardson and Maj. Andrew Williamson at the Battle of Ninety Six. When the loyalists were overwhelmed and defeated, Fletchall and Richardson were arrested and imprisoned at Charleston. They were released when they agreed that they would not fight against the Whig government. Released on July 10, 1776, he returned to Fair Forest, where he found that it had been destroyed.

The Loyalists, also known as Torys, became downtrodden during the war, particularly when the royal governor of South Carolina boarded a ship to take him away from the colony in 1780 and the Whigs created governmental bodies to run the colony.

== Latter years ==
After the loyalists lost at the Battle of Kings Mountain in October 1780, Fletchall and other supporters of the king were less popular in South Carolina. Fletchall received threats against his family from the patriots. On October 10, 1780, Fletchall and his family fled the area for their safety. They went to Charleston, which was controlled by the British. On December 1, 1789 or December 1782, the Fletchals boarded the HMS Milford for Jamaica. The family settled at Saint James Parish in Cornwall County. Thomas Fletchall died there in 1789.

After the end of the war, his property was confiscated and sold. The Union County Historical Society erected a highway marker about him and his plantation in 2008. It is located on State Highway 49 in Union, South Carolina.

== See also ==
- Snow Campaign
- Siege of Savage's Old Fields

== Sources ==
- Jones, E. Alfred, ed. (1921). The Ohio State University Bulletin: Contributions in History and Political Science. Ohio State University. pp. 66–67.
