= Isaac Hayne =

American army officer (1745–1781)

- Born: September 23, 1745; Colony of South Carolina
- Died: August 4, 1781 (aged 35); Charleston, South Carolina
- Cause of death: Execution by hanging
- Military career
- Allegiance: United States
- Branch: Continental Army
- Rank: Colonel
- Conflicts: American Revolutionary War

Isaac Hayne Jr. (23 September 1745 – 4 August 1781) was a wealthy resident of South Carolina at the time of the American Revolutionary War. He joined the rebellion and served militarily until his surrender at the 1780 siege of Charleston. Along with other officers, Hayne was paroled on a promise not to serve against the Crown until exchanged. In 1781, amid increasing conflict, Hayne swore an explicit oath of allegiance to the Crown to avoid confinement. A few months later, he rejoined the rebellion and led a raid on loyal forces, but was captured. A Court of Inquiry determined Hayne had broken his oath of allegiance. As such, he was court-martialed and executed by the British for treason.

== Biography ==
Hayne was the son of Isaac Hayne Sr and Sarah Williamson and grandson of John Hayne, immigrant from Shropshire, England to South Carolina. He inherited a 900-acre plantation and 23 slaves from his father. He would increase his holdings throughout his life. At the time of his death, Hayne also owned Sycamore plantation with its 650 acres, the 700-acre Pear Hill plantation, five lots in Beaufort, two lots in Charleston and one-half interest in an iron works in York District. Overall, Hayne owned 6,500 acres scattered in South Carolina, and 1000 acres on the Turtle River in Georgia. By then he also owned approximately 130 to 150 enslaved people. The total number of human beings that he had owned during his life isn't known.

At the beginning of the War of Independence, Hayne joined the rebellion, and was a commissioned captain of artillery, and at the same time state senator. In 1780, on the invasion of the state by the British, he served in a cavalry regiment during the final siege of Charleston, and, being included in the capitulation of that place, was on parole not serve against the British until exchanged.

In 1781, as the fortunes of the British began to decline, he, with all the others who were paroled on the same terms, was required to join the defense or be subjected to close confinement.Hayne didn't want to be imprisoned because his wife and several of his children were ill with smallpox. So he went to Charleston, and swore an oath of allegiance.

After the successes of General Greene had left the British nothing but Charleston, Hayne was summoned to join the royal army immediately. This being in violation of the agreement that had been made, he considered that this released him from all his obligations to the British. He went to the American camp, and was commissioned colonel of a militia company.

Hayne then commanded an American rebel raid which captured Brigadier-General Andrew Williamson, an American Loyalist. Colonel Nisbet Balfour, the British commander in Charleston during the 1781 siege of Charlestown, sent a column to intercept the raiding party. The interception was successful. There was a skirmish resulting in the defeat of the raiding party, the release of Williamson and the capture of Hayne.

A court of inquiry was convened to determine Hayne's status. It confirmed he had broken his earlier parole not to take up arms against the Crown. He was executed in Charleston on August 4, 1781. He was buried on the family property in Jacksonboro.

Hayne married Elizabeth Hutson, daughter of Rev. William Hutson and Mary Woodward. They were the parents of six children.
