= South Carolina in the American Revolution =

South Carolina was outraged over British tax policies in the 1760s that violated what they saw as their constitutional right to "no taxation without representation". Merchants joined the boycott against buying British products. When the London government harshly punished Massachusetts for the Boston Tea Party, South Carolina's leaders joined eleven other colonies (except Georgia) in forming the Continental Congress. When the British attacked Lexington and Concord in the spring of 1775 and were beaten back by the Massachusetts Patriots, South Carolina Patriots rallied to support the American Revolution. Loyalists and Patriots of the colony were split by nearly 50/50.

Many of the South Carolinian battles fought during the American Revolution were with loyalist Carolinians and the part of the Cherokee tribe that allied with the British. This was to General Henry Clinton's advantage. His strategy was to march his troops north from St. Augustine, Florida, and sandwich George Washington in the North. Clinton alienated Loyalists and enraged Patriots by attacking a fleeing army of Patriot soldiers who posed no threat. Enslaved Africans and African Americans chose independence by escaping to British lines where they were promised freedom.

Combined Continental Army and state militia forces under the command of Major General Nathanael Greene regained control of much of South Carolina by capturing the numerous interdependent chain of British-held forts throughout the State. One by one, the British and Loyalists were surrounded in the capital of Charles Town and became completely dependent on supplies by sea. After preliminary peace terms had been agreed, the British evacuated Charles Town on December 14, 1782, a day now officially designated as "South Carolina Independence Day". Greene was awarded a Congressional Medal and numerous other official awards from the State of South Carolina for his leadership in liberating the state and for restoring an elected government. In 1787, South Carolina representatives John Rutledge, Charles Pinckney, Charles Cotesworth Pinckney, and Pierce Butler went to Philadelphia where the Constitutional Convention was being held and constructed what served as a detailed outline for the U.S. Constitution.

== Pre-war causes ==
After Parliament began taxing the North American colonies to raise revenue to make up for the costs of the French and Indian War and Pontiac's War, to protest the Stamp Act, South Carolina sent wealthy rice planter Thomas Lynch, 26-year-old lawyer John Rutledge, and Christopher Gadsden to the Stamp Act Congress. Gadsden, leader of the pro-Independence "Liberty Boys," is often grouped with James Otis and Patrick Henry as the prime agitators for American independence by historians.

In 1767, the Townsend Acts levied new taxes on glass, oil, wine, tea, paper, and other goods. Gadsden led the opposition and although Britain removed the taxes on everything except tea, Charlestonians mirrored the Boston Tea Party by dumping a shipment of tea into the Cooper River. Other shipments were allowed to land, but they rotted in Charles Town storehouses.

Delegates from twelve colonies, all of the Thirteen Colonies except for Georgia, came together for the First Continental Congress in 1774. Five South Carolinians, including those who represented the colony in the Stamp Act Congress, headed for Philadelphia. Henry Middleton served as president for part of Congress. The following January the South Carolina colonial assembly was disbanded by Royal Governor Lord William Campbell, and it was reformed as an extralegal Provincial Congress. This South Carolina Provincial Congress had further meetings until March 1776, and thus South Carolinians had created a temporary government. This ruled until the colony had settled things with Britain. In March 1776 South Carolina adopted its first constitution, John Rutledge was voted "president" of the state, and the legislature was called the "General Assembly of South Carolina". The term "Republic" or "Republic of South Carolina" was never used.

Most Loyalists came from the Upcountry (known as the Upstate, since the 1960s), which thought that domination by the rich, elitist Charles Town planter class in an unsupervised government was worse than remaining under the rule of the British Crown. Judge William Henry Drayton and Reverend William Tennent were sent to the Back Country to gain support for the "American Cause" and Lowcountry's General Committee and Provincial Congress but did not have much success. In September 1775, the Royal Governor dissolved the last-ever Royal Assembly in South Carolina and left for the safety of the British warship Tamar in the Charleston Harbor.

== Early conflicts ==
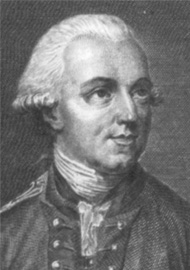
British General Henry Clinton

Throughout the course of the American Revolutionary War, over 200 battles were fought within South Carolina, more than in any other state. On November 19, 1775, Patriot forces of the Long Cane Militia fought Loyalists in the first battle of Ninety Six, resulting in the death of James Birmingham, the first South Carolinian and southerner of the war. Colonel Richard Richardson led a large party of Whigs into the Upcountry to arrest Loyalists and to assert the power of the revolutionary General Committee over the entire colony.

Britain's strategy was to take advantage of the Loyalist support in the South, begin a military drive in Charles Town, and perhaps sweep through the Upcountry, North Carolina, and Virginia while gathering men to take on Washington in the North. Under Colonel William Moultrie, the South Carolinians defeated the Royal Navy in the Battle of Sullivan's Island on June 28, 1776, and brought the Patriot Continental Army a major victory. In Philadelphia, the news reached delegates of the Second Continental Congress on July 19, over two weeks after delegates had voted to adopt the Declaration of Independence. The Battle of Sullivan's Island also caused the British to rethink their strategy and leave the South for approximately three years.

The new state legislature met the next December to complete the state constitution made the previous October, de-establishing the Anglican Church. In the Upcountry, the British had convinced the Cherokee to fight on their side. Although the British officer in charge of the operation had told the Cherokee to attack only Patriot soldiers in organized groups, soon murder and cabin burnings were widespread on the frontier. The Whigs' Andrew Williamson, Andrew Pickens, and James Williams, who had been battling Loyalists in the Upcountry, launched a successful campaign against the Cherokee. In 1777 they ceded their remaining lands to the South Carolina government. On February 5, 1778, South Carolina became the first state to ratify the Articles of Confederation, the first constitution of the United States. In 1780, the British returned to South Carolina.

== Siege of Charleston ==
In 1780, the British, stalemated in the north and facing pressure from home to end the war, embarked on a plan of action that would come to be known to historians as "The Southern Strategy." They planned to trap George Washington's troops by pushing their troops up from the South while Washington defended himself in the North. The British landed a major expeditionary force south of Charleston, landing on John's Island, moving to James Island, and then besieging Charles Town. General Benjamin Lincoln defended the city during a two-month siege but was forced to surrender almost all the Continental forces in the Carolinas to General Clinton. Henry Middleton, once president of the Continental Congress, was forced to take an oath of allegiance to the Crown as a prisoner.

General Washington begged Governor John Rutledge and the rest of the state's council to leave Charles Town while there was still time, and they did. Rutledge traveled around the state, printing proclamations and other state papers on a printing press he had with him, and sending numerous letters demanding that the Continental Congress send the Continental Army to relieve South Carolina.

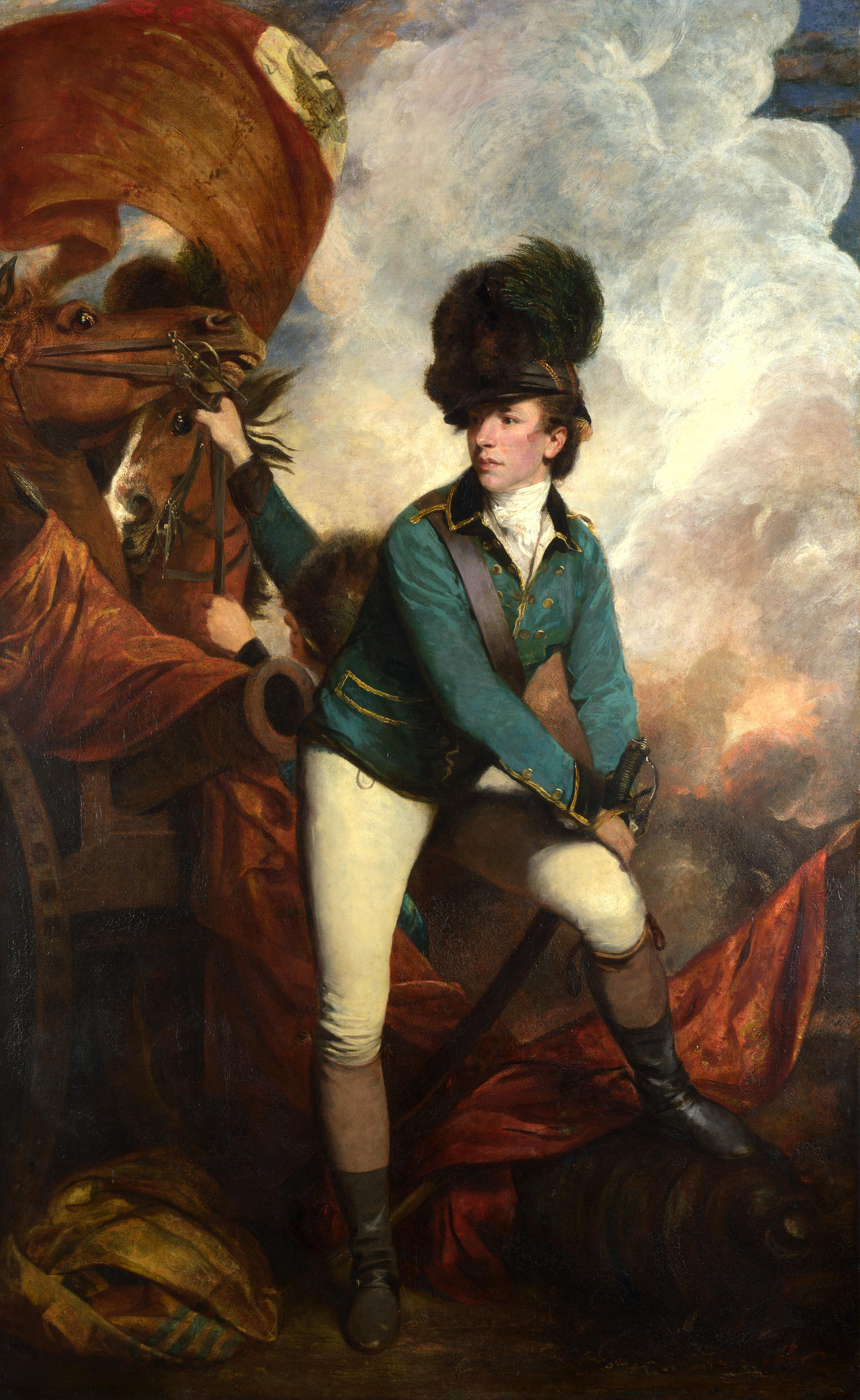
Portrait of Banastre Tarleton by Sir Joshua Reynolds

The British quickly established control over the coast, making posts at the other port cities of Beaufort and Georgetown. It was during this time that many enslaved African Americans managed to escape to their lines. The African Americans wanted freedom, and the British promised them that. Approximately 25,000 African Americans, one-quarter of the enslaved population, escaped to the British during the war to achieve freedom.

The British followed their coastal occupation by establishing posts upcountry where they could establish control by coordinating with local Tories.

Responding to Rutledge's pleas and the British threat to the whole southern flank, Washington sent an army of Continentals under General Gates, but was defeated at Camden on August 16, 1780, and the remnant of the army retreated northward in record time.

Just before the battle of Camden, Gates met with Francis Marion, a militia officer who had escaped parole at the defeat of Charleston because of an accidental injury, which caused him to be out of town at the surrender. Marion had a small group of rag-tag militia men with him, whose appearance evoked derision from the Continentals. Gates saw Marion as an embarrassment and got rid of him by giving him orders to scout the British and destroy boats, bridges, and other items that might be useful to the British.

Marion left, obeying his orders, and missed the battle. The following day, by order of Governor Rutledge, and by invitation of the troops, he accepted command of the Williamsburg militia at the confluence of Lynches River and the Pee Dee River. This band joined with a few other militiamen from around the state became known as Marion's Brigade (Marion was eventually commissioned general). Marion had not yet heard the news of Gates' defeat at the time. The next day a small militia under Thomas Sumter was surprised and completely routed at Fishing Creek; Sumter barely escaped with his life. At this point, Marion had the only viable Patriot army left in the South. From that time until the arrival of General Nathanael Greene, the war's outcome in the south depended entirely on the militia, and the militia gradually turned the tide.

The war was not only a clash of arms but a battle for the sympathy of the population. After leaving Gates, Marion began a new and unheard of policy, as he destroyed boats the British might use, and commandeered food, horses and other property from the settlers. He had his troops issue receipts for each item to the owners. His gentlemanly actions quickly made Marion a hero and garnered support for his brigade. Many of these receipts were redeemed after the war, with the new state government usually paying in full.

== General Clinton's mistakes ==
General Clinton thought that South Carolina was a Loyalist colony that had been bullied into revolutionary actions by a small minority. His idea was to increase British presence in the entire state and bring back the confidence of moderates in the area so that they would fight for the British. Clinton alienated Loyalists by spending all of the money on extra arms and soldiers rather than doctors.

American Colonel Abraham Buford and his body of Virginia patriots had set south in hopes of defending Charles Town but turned back when they realized they were too late. British Lieutenant Colonel Banastre Tarleton was unwilling to let the rebels escape back to the North and chased after them, another act that alienated more loyalists. Tarleton caught up with them on May 29, 1780, near the present town of Lancaster, South Carolina, and Americans were told to surrender, but refused. They still marched forward with full knowledge that Tarleton was fast approaching. In the Battle of Waxhaws the Americans were routed by Tarleton and his men, who suffered minimal casualties. Due to confusion in the battle, quarter was refused, and a number of Americans who had surrendered were killed. This spawned the battle cry that Southern patriots would use for the rest of the war, "Tarleton's quarter!".

The second British blunder was Clinton revoking the Carolinians' paroles. He broke his promise that if the Carolinians who surrendered did not actively seek to harass the British government, he would leave them and their paroles alone. On June 3, he proclaimed that all prisoners of war could either take up arms against their fellow Americans or be considered traitors to the Crown. Many soldiers, whose pride had already been bruised, reasoned that if they were going to have to take the chance of getting shot again, they might as well fight on the side they wanted to win.

The third British mistake was burning the Stateburg, South Carolina, home and harassing the incapacitated wife of a then inconsequential colonel named Thomas Sumter. Because of his fury over this, Sumter became one of the fiercest and most devastating guerrilla leaders of the war, becoming known as "The Gamecock". The Lowcountry partisans fighting under Marion and Upcountry partisans fighting under Andrew Pickens (whose home had also been burned) plagued the British by using guerilla warfare in the mountains, woods, and swamps of the state.

== Tides turn for the Americans ==
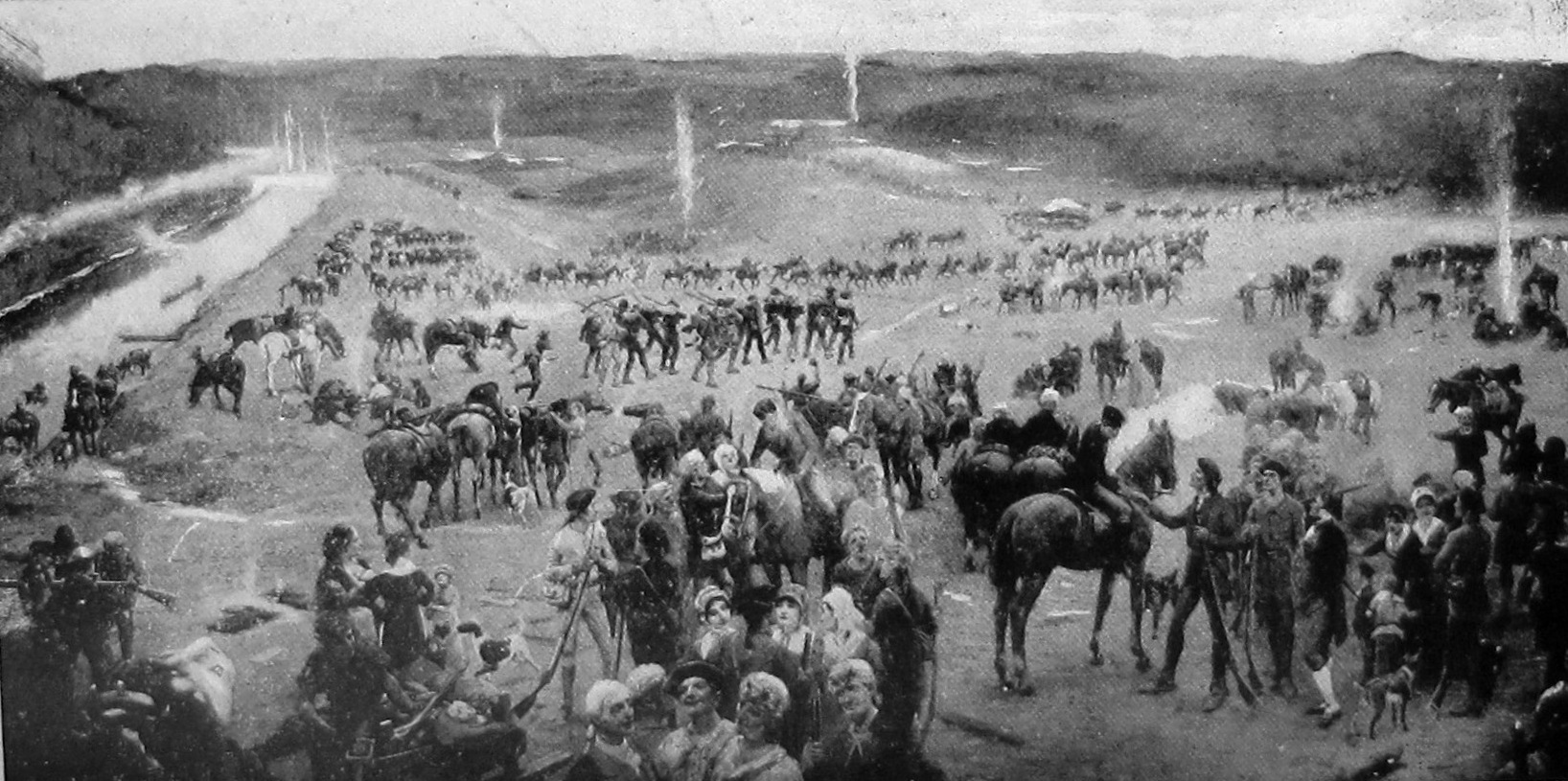
Gathering of Overmountain Men at Sycamore Shoals, by Lloyd Branson, depict Overmountain Men en route to their victory at the Battle of Kings Mountain in 1780

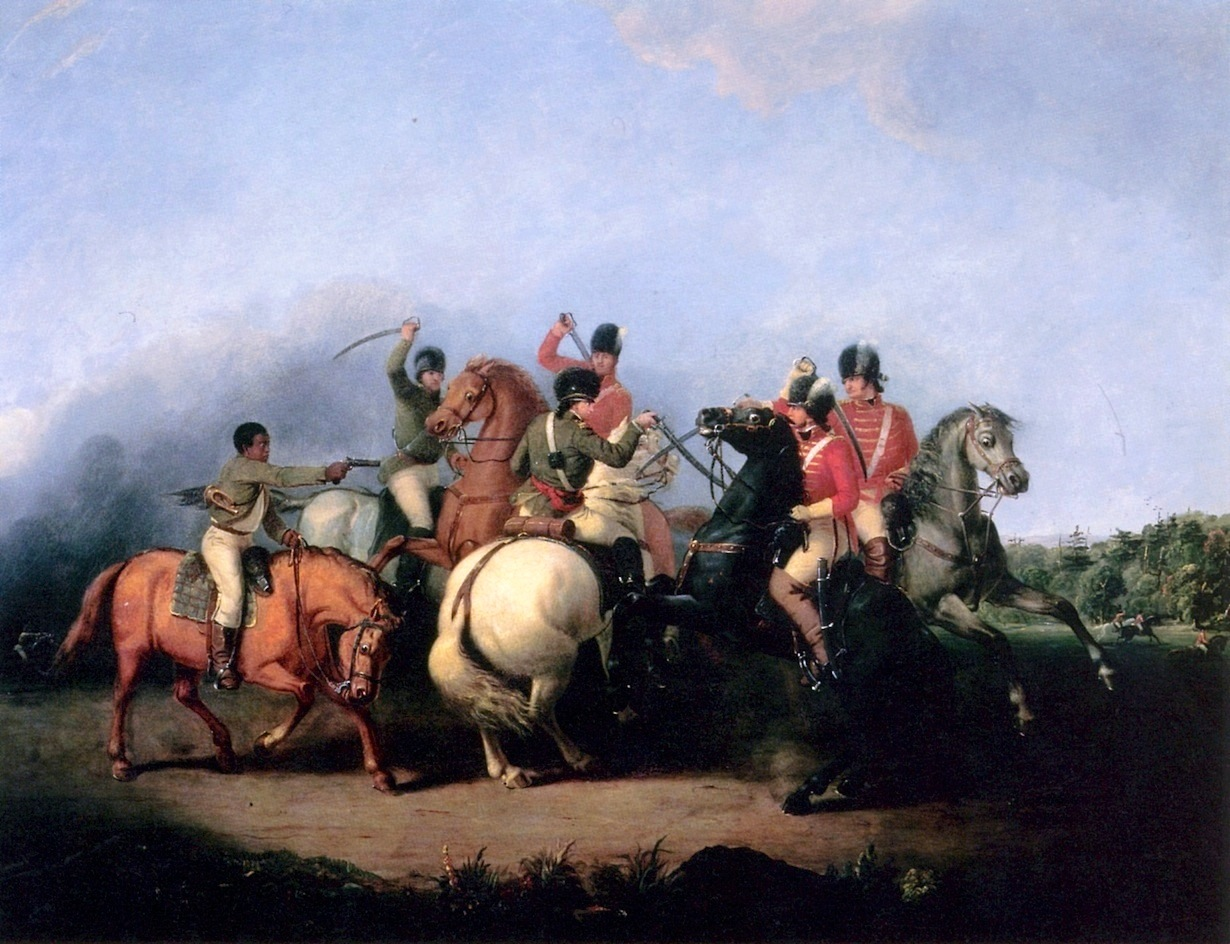
Battle of Cowpens, 1781

On October 8, 1780, at Kings Mountain, American Colonel Isaac Shelby led a body of North and South Carolinians and attacked British Major Patrick Ferguson and his body of American loyalists on a hilltop. America's first major poet, William Cullen Bryant, described the home field advantage that led to the Patriot victory in one of his poems. This was a major victory for the Patriots, especially because it was won by militiamen and not trained Continentals. It provided a great swing of momentum for the moderate "Overmountain Men" who had grown tired of British brutality. Kings Mountain is considered to be the turning point of the revolution in the South, because it squashed any significant further recruitment of Loyalists, and compelled Cornwallis to temporarily abandon North Carolina.

That December, General Nathanael Greene arrived with an army of Continental troops. When Greene heard of Tarleton's approach, he sent Brigadier General Daniel Morgan and his backwoodsmen over the Appalachian Mountains to stop him. On January 17, 1781, the two forces met at a grassy field with widespread hardwoods, reeds, and marsh in a well-known cattle grazing area called Cowpens. Pickens and his guerilla soldiers joined Morgan directly before the battle. Morgan still felt they were not strong enough to take on Tarleton's trained troops and wanted to cross a river that would separate them from the British and secure them a chance to retreat. Pickens convinced Morgan that staying on the British side of the river would force his men to fight it out in what some historians consider the best-planned battle of the entire war. The Patriots defeated the British and later battles at Hobkirk's Hill and Eutaw Springs would further weaken the British.

Fighting continued throughout 1781 in the backcountry, where patriot and loyalist militias alike looted homes and killed civilians. One of the most infamous is William "Bloody Bill" Cunningham's "Bloody Scout," who terrorized homes and massacred dozens of Whigs.

In December 1782, the British evacuated Charles Town. The overjoyed residents changed the name to "Charleston" because it sounded "less British."

== Loyalists ==
South Carolina had one of the strongest Loyalists factions of any state. About 5,000 men took up arms against the Patriot government during the revolution, and thousands more were supporters who avoided taxes, sold supplies to the British, and who had avoided conscription. Nearly all had emigrated to the province after 1765, as only about one in six was native-born. About 45% of the Loyalists were small farmers, 30% were merchants, artisans or shopkeepers; 15% were large farmers or plantation owners, and 10% were royal officials. Geographically, they were strongest in the back-country, where most settlers before the revolution had opposed the coastal aristocracy.

South Carolina had endured bitter internal strife between Patriots and Loyalists during the war (esp. 1780–82). Nevertheless, it adopted a policy of reconciliation that proved more moderate than any other state. About 4500 Loyalists left when the war ended, but the majority remained behind. The state government successfully and quickly reincorporated the vast majority. During the war, pardons were offered to Loyalists who switched sides and joined the Patriot forces. Others were required to pay a 10% fine of the value of their property. The legislature named 232 Loyalists liable for the confiscation of their property, but most appealed and were forgiven.

== The Constitution ==
In 1787, John Rutledge, Charles Pinckney, Charles Cotesworth Pinckney, and Pierce Butler went to Philadelphia where the Constitutional Convention was piecing together the Constitution. At thirty years old, Charles Pinckney had long been a critic of the weak Articles of Confederation. Although he was wealthy by birth and quite the epicurean, Pinckney became the leader of democracy in the state. On May 29, 1787, he presented the convention with a detailed outline of the United States Constitution, and John Rutledge provided valuable input. Pierce Butler, a major slaveholder who lost numerous slaves during the war who escaped to the British, included a constitutional clause for the return of fugitive slaves.

The federal, and Federalist-leaning, Constitution was ratified by the state in May 1788. The new state constitution was ratified in 1790.

During the 1780s, Charleston physician David Ramsay published two of the first histories of the American Revolution: The History of the Revolution of South-Carolina (1785) and The History of the American Revolution (1789).

== See also ==
- Southern theater of the American Revolutionary War
- List of South Carolina militia units in the American Revolution
