= Siege of Savage's Old Fields =

1775 Siege of the American Revolutionary War

Coordinates: 34°8′49″N 82°1′28″W

- Part of the Southern Theatre of the American Revolutionary War
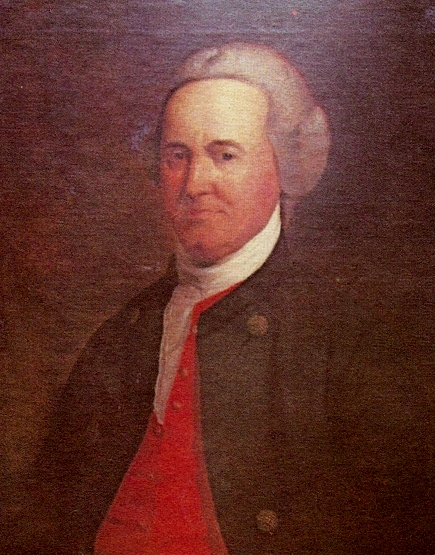
- A portrait of Richard Richardson
Date	November 19–21, 1775
Location	Ninety Six, South Carolina
Result	Inconclusive

Belligerents
South Carolina	Great Britain

Commanders and leaders
Andrew Williamson	Patrick Cuningham; Joseph Robinson

Strength
560 militia and regulars	1,892 militia

Casualties and losses
1 killed 12 wounded	4 killed 20 wounded

The siege of Savage's Old Fields (also known as the first siege of Ninety Six, November 19–21, 1775) was an encounter between Patriot and Loyalist forces in the back country town of Ninety Six, South Carolina, early in the American Revolutionary War. It was the first major conflict in South Carolina in the war, having been preceded by bloodless seizures of several military fortifications in the province.

Patriot forces under the command of Major Andrew Williamson had been dispatched to the area to recover a shipment of gunpowder and ammunition intended for the Cherokee that had been seized by Loyalists. Williamson's force, numbering over 500, established a stockaded fort near Ninety Six, where it was surrounded by some 1,900 Loyalists.

The war was in its early days and the partisan war in the southern back country had not become as brutal as it later became; the siege was conducted in a desultory manner and was effectively a stalemate. After two days, the Loyalists withdrew. Four Loyalists were killed, and 20 were wounded. One Patriot was killed and twelve were wounded. The Patriots withdrew toward the coast, but a major Patriot expedition not long after led to the arrest or flight of most of the Loyalist leadership.

== Background ==
When the American Revolutionary War began in Massachusetts in April 1775, the free population of the Province of South Carolina was divided in its reaction. Many English coastal residents were either neutral or favored the rebellion, while significant numbers of backcountry residents, many of whom were German and Scottish immigrants, were opposed. Loyalist sentiment in the back country was dominated by Thomas Fletchall, a vocal and active opponent of Patriot attempts to resist King and Parliament. By August 1775 tensions between Patriot and Loyalist in the province had escalated to the point where both sides had raised sizable militia forces.

Events were largely nonviolent for some time, although there were isolated instances of tarring and feathering, but tensions were high as the sides struggled for control of munitions. The Council of Safety in early August sent William Henry Drayton and Reverend William Tennent to Ninety Six to rally Patriot support and suppress growing Loyalist support in the back country. Drayton was able to negotiate a tenuous truce with Fletchall in September.

On September 15, Patriot militia seized Fort Johnson, the principal fortification overlooking the Charleston harbor. Governor William Campbell dissolved the provincial assembly, and fearing for his personal safety, fled to the Royal Navy sloop of war HMS Tamar. This left the Patriot Council of Safety in control of the provincial capital. The council began improving and expanding Charleston's coastal defenses; eventually this culminated in a bloodless exchange of cannon fire between Patriot positions and Royal Navy ships in the harbor on November 11 and 12.

Matters also escalated after the seizure by Loyalists in October of a shipment of gunpowder and ammunition sent by the Council of Safety and intended for the Cherokee. The council responded by organizing a large-scale expedition to recover the munitions. On November 8 it voted to send Colonel Richard Richardson, the commander of the Camden militia, to recover the shipment and arrest Loyalist leaders.

== Siege ==
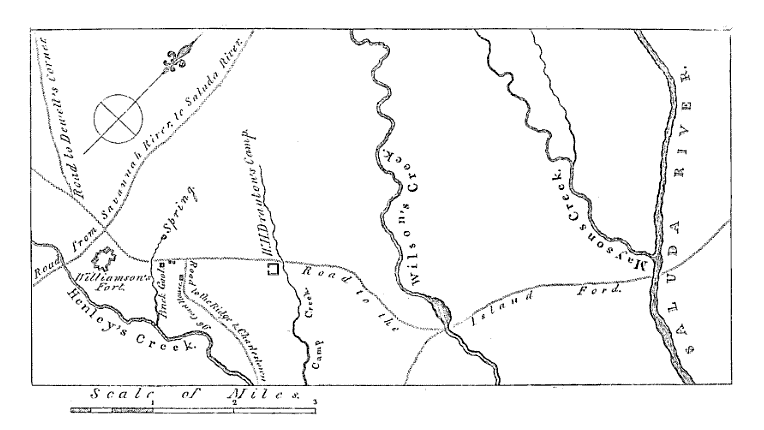
Map showing the area around Ninety Six, including Williamson's fort

While Richardson gathered his forces, Major Andrew Williamson, who had already been recruiting in the back country, learned of the gunpowder seizure. He arrived at Ninety Six early on November 19 with 560 men. Finding the small town to be not very defensible, he established a camp on John Savage's plantation, provided a field of fire for the force's three swivel guns. He began fortifying the camp, ordering the construction of an improvised stockade. Loyalist recruiting had been more successful: Williamson had learned that Captain Patrick Cuningham and Major Joseph Robinson were leading a large Loyalist force (estimated to number about 1,900) toward Ninety Six. In a war council that day, the Patriot leaders decided against marching out to face the Loyalists. The Loyalists arrived the next day, and surrounded the Patriot camp.

The leaders of the two factions were in the midst of negotiating an end to the standoff when two Patriot militiamen were seized by Loyalists outside the stockade. This set off a gunfight that lasted for about two hours. The next morning the two sides resumed firing at each other at long range. The Loyalists attempted to set fires, creating a smokescreen they could use to approach the stockade. This attempt was frustrated by the wet ground. The Loyalists next constructed a large wooden shield behind which they sought to bring incendiaries closer to the fort, but they only succeeded in "[setting] Fire to their own Engine themselves", according to one account, and it was not proof against the Patriot's guns.

On the afternoon of November 21 the Patriots held a war council, in which they decided to sortie that night. They were preparing for this action at sunset when a Loyalist approached with a parley flag. Nothing was decided in the discussion beyond an agreement to meet the next morning. In that meeting, the Loyalists agreed to withdraw across the Saluda River and the Patriots agreed to destroy the fort. Both sides were to return prisoners taken since November 2 and not interfere with each other's communications with their respective political leaders. The Patriot leaders were also required to surrender their swivel guns, although they were returned three days later. The truce also included reinforcements for both sides, terms that the Council of Safety claimed did not apply to Colonel Richardson's force.

== Aftermath ==
The reasons why the Loyalists chose to negotiate the truce are unknown. Governor Campbell described the Loyalists as lacking in effective leadership, and historian Martin Cann speculates that it may have been caused by Colonel Richardson's preparations or approach. Richardson mobilized 2,500 men, which grew by the end of November to more than 4,000. This force scoured the back country, arresting or driving away most of the Loyalist leadership. The campaign effectively ended on December 22, when 15 inches (38 cm) of snow fell on the area. Richardson's men, unprepared for the snow, made a difficult trek back to the lowlands.

Some of the Loyalist leaders who escaped Richardson's expedition, including most notably Thomas Brown, fled to West Florida where they joined regular and irregular forces serving with the British. These events resulted in the end of large-scale Loyalist activity in the southern Appalachians, although what was in many ways a civil war became progressively more brutal in the following years. Ninety Six became a British outpost after the 1780 siege of Charleston, and was besieged in 1781 by forces under the command of Nathanael Greene. Although Greene was forced to lift that siege by the approach of a relief force, the British abandoned Ninety Six not long afterward.

== Order of Battle ==
Patriots:

Commanding Officer – Major Andrew Williamson of the Ninety-Six District Regiment of Militia.

- Ninety-Six District Regiment led by Major Andrew Williamson with the twelve known companies
- Little River District Regiment detachment including five known companies
- Camden District Regiment detachment including two known companies
- New Acquisition District Regiment detachment led by Capt. John Anderson with 11 men
- Lower District Regiment detachment led by Capt. Andrew Pickens with 40 men
- Spartan Regiment detachment led by Capt. John Lisle Jr. with unknown number of men
- Independent Company of Rangers led by Capt. John Bowie with unknown number of men
- Independent Company of Rangers led by Capt. Benjamin Tutt with 34 men
- Independent Company of Rangers led by Capt. Ezekiel Polk with unknown number of men
- 3rd South Carolina Regiment (Rangers) detachment led by Major James Mayson with the seven known companies
- First Rowan County Regiment of Militia (NC) led by Col. Griffith Rutherford and Lt. Col. Francis Locke, with at least seven known companies
- Georgia Militia detachment led by Capt. Jacob Colson with 18 men

British/Loyalist:

- 1,892 Loyalists led by Major Joseph Robinson – the Ninety-Six District Loyalist Militia, New Acquisition Regiment with fifteen known companies

== See also ==
- American Revolutionary War §Early Engagements. The siege of Savage's Old Fields placed in overall sequence and strategic context
