= Battle of Coweecho River =

Battle of the American Revolutionary War fought in North Carolina

Battle of the Coweecho River
- Part of the American Revolutionary War
Date	September 19, 1776
Location	Near present-day Franklin, North Carolina 35°9′29.4″N 83°33′52.5″W
Result	Patriot/Catawba victory

Belligerents
Cherokee (Kingdom of Great Britain) Loyalist militia	Patriot militia Catawba

Commanders and leaders
Ostenaco (Kingdom of Great Britain) Malachi Rieves (WIA)(POW) (Kingdom of Great Britain) Jeremiah Huffman (WIA)(POW)	Col. Andrew Williamson; Kesegowaase

Strength
300 Cherokee; 50 Loyalists	Unknown

Casualties and losses
4 confirmed killed 8 wounded 13 captured	13 killed 26 wounded

The Battle of the Coweecho River (also known as Black Hole) took place in what today is Macon County, North Carolina between Patriot militia and their Catawba allies and Cherokee warriors with their Loyalist allies on September 19, 1776, during the American Revolutionary War.

The region of the Appalachian mountain range and nearby areas became the scene of a dispute between the Cherokee and Anglo-European settlers who were continuing to expand west. In response to this, the Cherokee initiated raids into these settlements in July and August 1776. The colonial governments coordinated counter-offenses to these attacks. Brigadier General Griffith Rutherford of the North Carolina militia and Colonel Andrew Williamson of the South Carolina Militia planned to rendezvous and attack the middle and lower Cherokee settlements located in both the Carolinas.

En route to meet with General Rutherford, the South Carolinians with their Catawba scouts were ambushed by the Cherokee with their Loyalist allies on September 19, 1776. Due to the terrain of the steep gorge there was no way to counter-attack except to charge straight towards the enemy, which the Patriot forces did, clearing a path with the use of bayonets. The Cherokee, running low on ammunition, were forced to withdraw.

Eventually, Col. Andrew Williamson met up with Brigadier General Griffith Rutherford at what today is Murphy, North Carolina on September 26, creating a combined force of 4,500 Patriots to take further action against the Cherokee, but this would not come to be.

Today, a state historic marker entitled with the name of the battle denotes the site of the engagement. It reads as follows: "During the American Revolution, S.C. forces under Colonel Andrew Williamson defeated the Cherokees, nearby, at the "Black Hole, Sept. 1776."
