= Tobacco War =

Conflict during the American Revolutionary War

- Part of the American Revolutionary War
Date	1780–1781
Location	Virginia
Result	destruction of 10,000 hogsheads of tobacco liberation of enslaved people

Belligerents
United States	Great Britain

Commanders and leaders
- Charles Cornwallis, Benedict Arnold, William Phillips

The Tobacco War (1780–1781) was an offensive in Virginia by British forces during the American Revolutionary War. Forces commanded by Charles Cornwallis, William Phillips, and Benedict Arnold, destroyed about 10,000 hogsheads of cured tobacco leaf. Each hogshead weighed about 1,000 lb (450 kg). The British wanted to win in the southern colonies by causing steep economic losses. They also wished to entirely disrupt the tobacco industry because the colonists used the tobacco trade to fund their war effort against Britain. This complemented existing efforts by the Royal Navy to seize shipments of tobacco leaving American ports.

Arnold attempted to bargain with the colonists for their tobacco. While in Richmond, Virginia, in January 1781, Arnold wrote a letter to Virginia Governor Thomas Jefferson, requesting him to surrender the city's tobacco supplies in exchange for British forces not destroying the city. Jefferson did not negotiate with Arnold or turn over the tobacco. The troops led by Phillips burned about 8,000 hogsheads of tobacco in Petersburg, Manchester, Blandford, and Osborne. In addition to burning the colonists' curing barns and tobacco fields, British forces also freed the enslaved people held by the colonists. Some of the scorched tobacco fields and 30 of the freed slaves belonged to Jefferson, who wrote that it was a "useless and barbarous injury". The Tobacco War represented the "last gasp of a floundering army", and did not significantly impact the trajectory of the Revolutionary War.

== See also ==
- Action at Osborne's
- Black Patch Tobacco Wars
- Southern theater of the American Revolutionary War
