= Southern theater of the American Revolutionary War =

Southern theater
- Part of the American Revolutionary War
- The Battle of Cowpens by Don Troiani
Date	1775–1783
Location	Virginia, North Carolina, South Carolina, Georgia, East Florida and West Florida
Result	Franco-Spanish-American victory: Surrender of a British army at Yorktown

Belligerents
United Colonies (1775–1776): Georgia; Maryland; North Carolina; South Carolina; Virginia; United States (1776–1782); France (1778–1782); Spain (1779–1782); Chickasaw; Choctaw; Catawba; Lumbee	Great Britain; Cherokee; Creek

Commanders and leaders
(United States) George Washington; (United States) Nathanael Greene; (United States) Daniel Morgan; (United States) Horatio Gates (United States) Benjamin Lincoln (surrendered) (United States) Thomas Sumter (United States) Francis Marion (United States) Marquis de Lafayette (Kingdom of France) Comte de Rochambeau (Kingdom of France) Comte d'Estaing (Spanish Empire) Bernardo de Gálvez	(Kingdom of Great Britain) Lord Charles Cornwallis (surrendered) (Kingdom of Great Britain) Sir Henry Clinton; (Kingdom of Great Britain) Banastre Tarleton (surrendered) (Kingdom of Great Britain) Francis Rawdon (Kingdom of Great Britain) Thomas Brown (Kingdom of Great Britain) Augustine Prevost (Kingdom of Great Britain) Earl of Dunmore (Kingdom of Great Britain) Benedict Arnold

Strength
Southern Army; Main Army; Rochembeau's expeditionary force Gálvez's force	British Southern Army, totalling approximately 8,000 regulars and militia

The southern theater of the American Revolutionary War was the major theater of military operations in the second half of the American Revolutionary War, 1778–1781. It encompassed engagements primarily in Virginia, Georgia, North Carolina, and South Carolina. Tactics consisted of both strategic battles and guerrilla warfare.

During the first three years of the conflict, 1775–1778, the largest military encounters between Continental Army and the British Army had been in the New England and Middle colonies, around Boston, New York, and Philadelphia. British General John Burgoyne's October 1777 defeat and surrender in the Saratoga campaign convinced the French to conclude a formal alliance with the Americans in 1778, transforming the conflict from one between Britain and the Thirteen Colonies to a global war. On the North American mainland the British Army largely abandoned operations in the north and pursued control of the Southern Colonies and troops were also redeployed to defend the British Caribbean sugar islands. Before 1778, the Southern colonies were largely dominated by Patriot-controlled governments and militias, although there was also a Continental Army presence that played a role in the 1776 defense of Charleston, the suppression of Loyalist militias, and attempts to drive the British from strongly Loyalist East Florida.

The British began to implement their "Southern Strategy" in late 1778 in Georgia. It initially achieved success with the capture of the port of Savannah, Georgia, which was followed in 1780 by operations in South Carolina that included the defeat of Continental forces under Horatio Gates at Charleston and Camden. At the same time France (in 1778) and Spain (in 1779) declared war on Great Britain in support of the United States. Spain captured all of British West Florida, culminating in the siege of Pensacola in 1781. France initially offered only naval support for the first few years after its declaration of war but in 1781 sent large numbers of soldiers to join General George Washington's army and marched into Virginia from New York. Major General Nathanael Greene, who took over as Continental Army commander after Camden, engaged in a strategy of avoidance and attrition against the British. The two forces fought a string of battles, most of which were victories for the British Army. However, the high cost in casualties weakened it, while the Continental Army remained largely intact to continue fighting. This was best exemplified by the Battle of Guilford Courthouse. Several American victories, such as the Battle of Ramseur's Mill, the Battle of Cowpens, and the Battle of Kings Mountain, also served to weaken the overall British military strength. The culminating engagement, the siege of Yorktown, ended with the surrender of British Lieutenant General Charles Cornwallis on October 19, 1781. It was essentially the last major battle of the Revolutionary War. Shortly afterward, negotiations between the United States and Great Britain began, resulting in the Treaty of Paris of 1783.

== Early operations, 1775–1778 ==
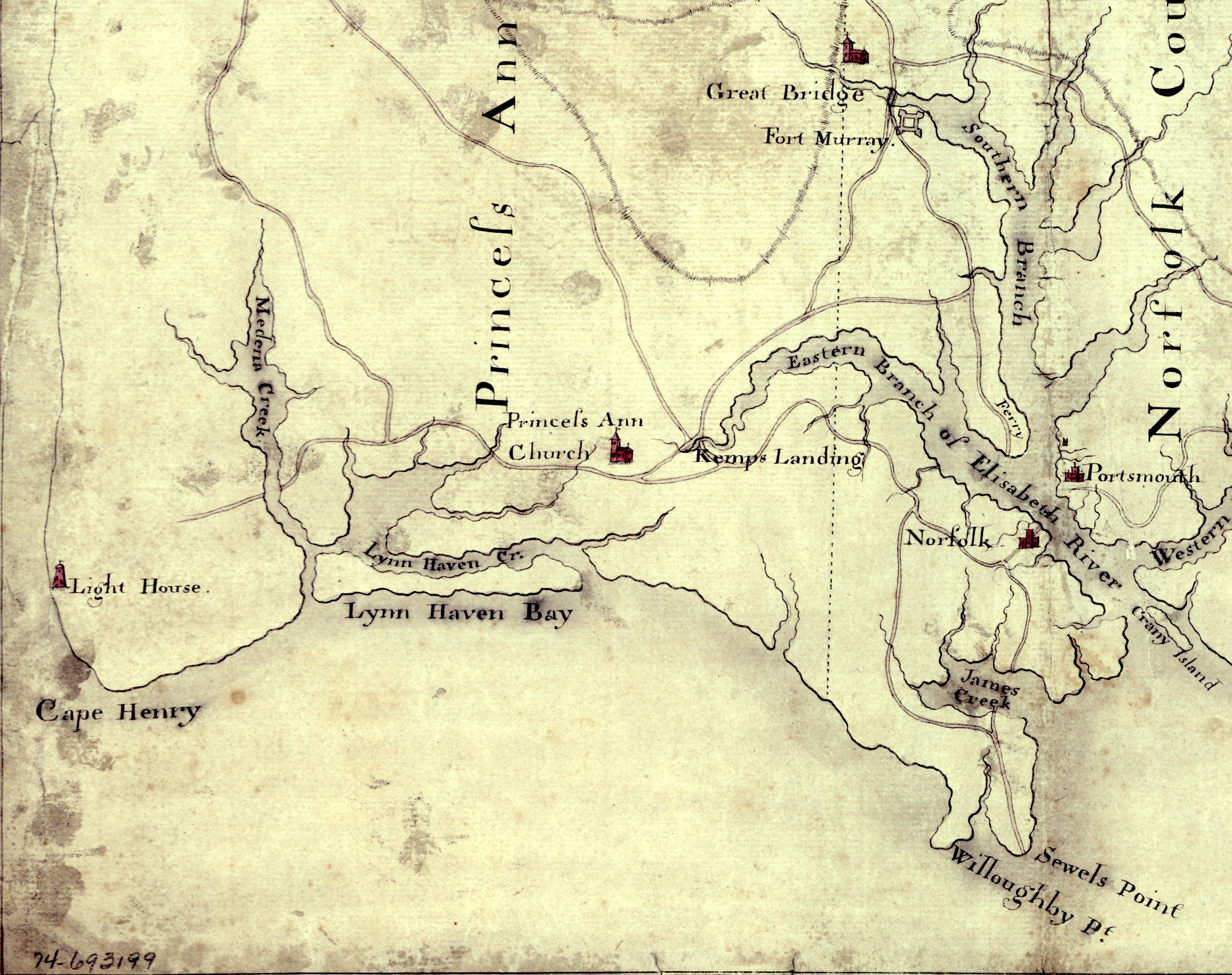
Detail of a 1770s map showing eastern Virginia and many of the places where conflict occurred in 1775. The map is oriented with North to the bottom and South to the top.

=== Virginia ===
In most colonies British officials quickly departed as the Patriots took control. In Virginia, the royal governor resisted. In the Gunpowder Incident of April 20, 1775, Lord Dunmore, the Royal Governor of Virginia, removed gunpowder stored in Williamsburg to a British warship in the James River. Dunmore saw rising unrest in the colony and was trying to deprive Virginia militia of supplies needed for insurrection. The Patriot militia, led by Patrick Henry, forced Dunmore to pay for the gunpowder. Dunmore continued to hunt for caches of military equipment and supplies in the following months, acts that were sometimes anticipated by Patriot militia, who would move supplies before his arrival.

Dunmore issued an emancipation proclamation in November 1775, promising freedom to runaway slaves who fought for the British. After an incident at Kemp's Landing in November where Dunmore's troops killed and captured Patriot militiamen, Patriot forces defeated Loyalist troops (which included runaway slaves Dunmore had formed into his Ethiopian Regiment) at the Battle of Great Bridge on December 9. Dunmore and his troops retreated to Royal Navy ships anchored off Norfolk; these naval forces bombarded and burned the town on January 1, 1776. Patriot forces in the town completed the destruction of the former Loyalist stronghold. Dunmore was driven from an island in Chesapeake Bay that summer and never returned to Virginia.

=== Georgia ===
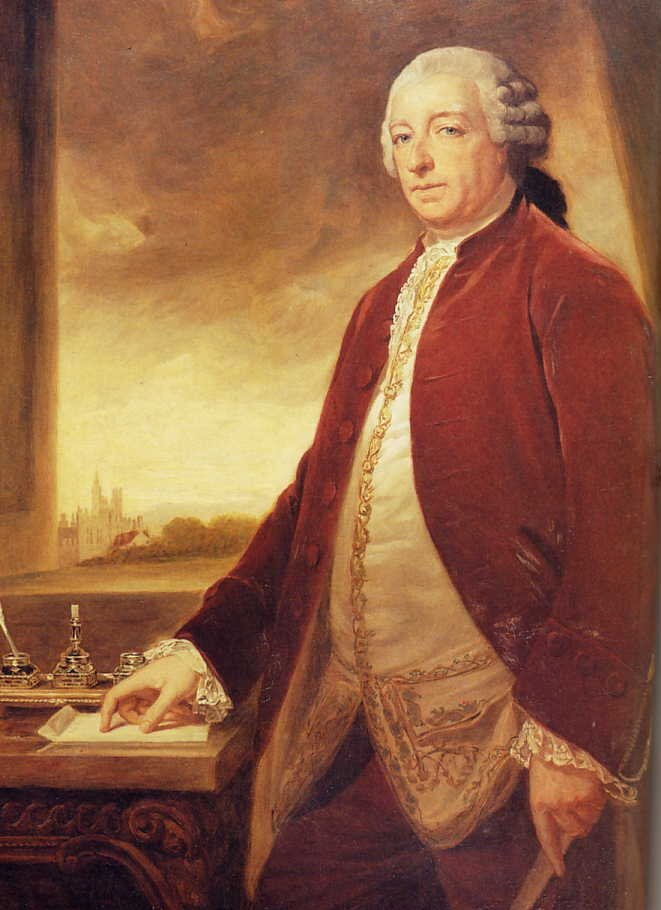
Lord Germain received overly optimistic information that a loyalist majority existed in Georgia; he aimed to regain control of the colony by capitalizing on loyalist support, with only a small deployment of British Army regular troops. This has been dubbed the Southern Strategy

Georgia Royal Governor James Wright nominally remained in power until January 1776, when the unexpected arrival of British ships near Savannah prompted the local Committee of Safety to order his arrest. Georgia Patriots and Loyalists alike believed the fleet had arrived to provide military support to the governor; it had been sent from the besieged British forces in Boston to acquire locally-grown rice and other provisions, since British supply lines were stretched. Wright escaped captivity and reached the fleet. In the Battle of the Rice Boats in early March, the British successfully left Savannah with several merchant vessels containing the desired rice supplies.

=== The Carolinas ===
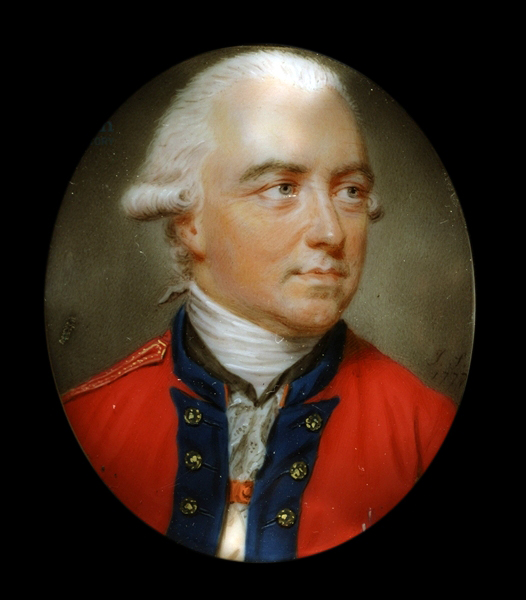
Sir Henry Clinton led the British land forces in the failed attack on Charleston.

South Carolina's population was politically divided when the war began. The Lowcountry communities, dominated by Charleston, sided strongly with the Patriots, while the backcountry held a large number of Loyalist sympathizers. By August 1775, both sides were recruiting militia companies. In September, a Patriot militia seized Fort Johnson, Charleston's major defense works, and Governor William Campbell fled to a Royal Navy ship in the harbor.

The seizure by Loyalists of a shipment of gunpowder and ammunition intended for the Cherokee caused an escalation in tensions that led to the first siege of Ninety Six in western South Carolina late November. Patriot recruiting was by then outstripping that of the Loyalists, and a major campaign (called the Snow Campaign due to unusually heavy snowfall) involving as many as 5,000 Patriots led by Colonel Richard Richardson succeeded in capturing or driving away most of the Loyalist leadership. Loyalists fled either to East Florida or to the Cherokee lands. A faction of the Cherokee, known as the Chickamauga, rose up in support of the British and Loyalists in 1776. They were finally defeated by militia forces from North and South Carolina.

Crucial in any British attempt to gain control of the South was the possession of a port to bring in supplies and men. To this end, the British organized an expedition to establish a strong post somewhere in the southern colonies and sent military leaders to recruit Loyalists in North Carolina. The expedition's departure from Europe was significantly delayed, and the Loyalist force that was recruited to meet it was decisively defeated in the Battle of Moore's Creek Bridge in late February 1776. When General Sir Henry Clinton arrived at Cape Fear in May, he found conditions there unsuitable for a strong post. Scouting by the Royal Navy identified Charleston, whose defenses were unfinished and seemed vulnerable, as a more suitable location. In June 1776, Clinton and Admiral Sir Peter Parker led an assault on Fort Sullivan, which guarded the Charleston harbor.

Clinton had failed to order a complete reconnaissance of the area. His 2,200 men force was landed on Long Island (adjacent to Sullivan's Island on which the fort was positioned), and they found the channel dividing the two islands too deep to ford. Instead of re-embarking on his boats, he relied on the expedition's naval forces to reduce the fort, which became known after the war as Fort Moultrie. However, the firepower of the British ships was unable to make an impression on the spongy palmetto logs that formed the majority of the fort's defenses, and the bombardment failed in its objective. It was a humiliating failure, and Clinton called off his campaign in the Carolinas. Clinton and Parker argued after the engagement, each blaming the other for the failure of the assault. It is debated that the South was lost by this failure to take Charleston in 1776, as it left the Loyalists unsupported for three years, while allowing the port of Charleston to serve the American cause until 1780.

=== East Florida ===
Patriots in Georgia attempted several times to defeat the British garrison that was based at Saint Augustine in British East Florida. This garrison actively supported the activities of Loyalists who fled there from Georgia and other southern states and were responsible for raiding cattle and other supplies in southern Georgia. The first attempt was organized by Charles Lee after he took command of the Southern Department but sputtered out when he was recalled to the main army. The second attempt was organized by Georgia Governor Button Gwinnett (who as a representative of Georgia to the Continental Congress, was one of the signatories (first signature on the left) on the United States Declaration of Independence) with minimal help from the new commander of the Southern Department, Robert Howe, in 1777. This expedition also failed. Gwinnett and his militia commander, Lachlan McIntosh, could not agree on anything. Some Georgia militia companies made it into East Florida, but they were checked in the May Battle of Thomas Creek.

The last expedition was in early 1778. More than 2,000 Continentals and state militia were raised for the effort, but it also failed due to issues of command between Howe and Georgia governor John Houstoun. A brief skirmish at Alligator Bridge in late June, combined with tropical diseases and command issues in the Patriot forces, left East Florida firmly in British hands for the war's duration.

== Southern Strategy ==
=== Loyalist support ===
In 1778, the British again turned their attention to the South, where they hoped to regain control by recruiting thousands of Loyalists. Their belief in widespread Loyalist support was based on the accounts of Loyalist exiles in London who had direct access to the British Secretary of State for America, George Germain. Keen to recover their lands and be rewarded for their loyalty to the crown, these men realized that the best way to convince the British to undertake a major operation in the South would be to exaggerate the level of potential Loyalist support.

As a group, Loyalists had great influence on the British ministers in London. In addition, there were strong business, trading and family ties among some Loyalists and the British in London. The British operated under the expectation that they would find substantial support for their actions, if only they liberated the right areas. While in South Carolina, Cornwallis wrote in a letter to Clinton that "Our assurances of attachment from our poor distressed friends in North Carolina are as strong as ever." For the most part, this assumption was incorrect, as Cornwallis soon realized as the campaign progressed.

=== British take Savannah ===
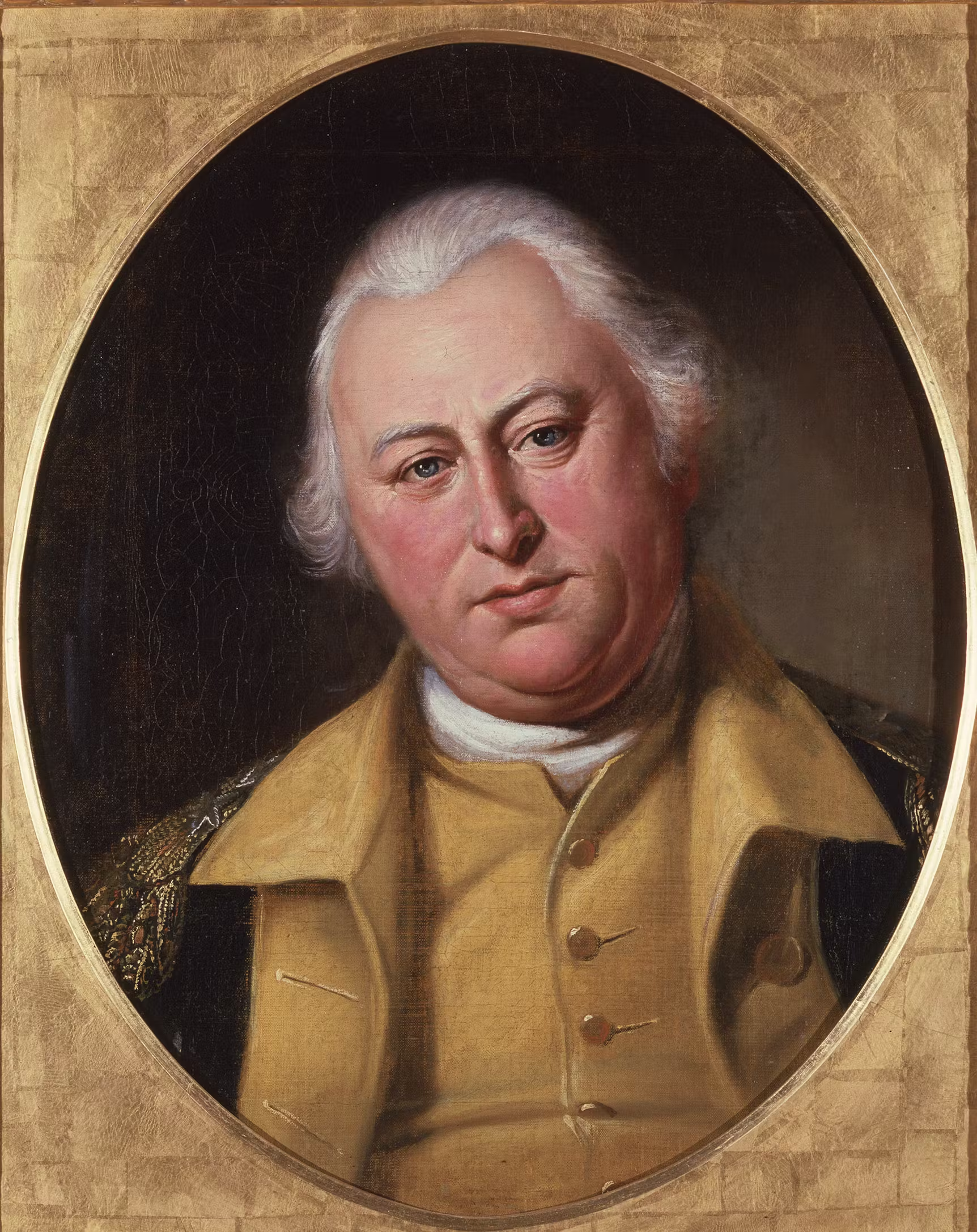
Portrait of Benjamin Lincoln by Charles Willson Peale

On April 19, 1778, three row galleys of the Georgia Navy engaged, defeated, and captured a Royal Navy brigantine, an armed British East Florida provincial sloop, and an armed brig.

On December 29, 1778, a British expeditionary corps of 3,500 men from New York, under the command of Lieutenant Colonel Archibald Campbell, captured Savannah, Georgia. He was joined in mid-January 1779 by Brigadier General Augustine Prevost, leading troops that marched up from Saint Augustine, Florida, taking over outposts along the way. Prevost assumed command of the forces in Georgia; and dispatched Campbell with 1,000 men toward Augusta with the goals of gaining control of that town and the recruitment of Loyalists.

The remnants of the defense of Savannah had retreated to Purrysburg, South Carolina, about 12 miles (19 km) upriver from Savannah, where they were met by Major General Benjamin Lincoln, commander of Continental Army forces in the South. He marched most of the army from Charleston in a move intended to monitor and oppose Prevost. Early in February, Prevost sent a few hundred men to occupy Beaufort in a move probably intended to divert Lincoln's attention from Campbell's movements; Lincoln responded by sending General William Moultrie and 300 men to drive them out. The February 3 Battle of Beaufort was largely indecisive, and both contingents eventually returned to their bases.

In the meantime, Campbell had taken control of Augusta without much resistance, and Loyalists were beginning to turn out. While he enrolled more than 1,000 men over a two-week period, he was powerless to prevent the defeat of a sizable number of Loyalists by Patriot militia under Andrew Pickens in the February 14 Battle of Kettle Creek, 50 miles (80 km) from Augusta. This demonstrated to everyone in the area the limits of the British Army's ability to protect Loyalists. Campbell suddenly left Augusta, apparently in response to the arrival of John Ashe and more than 1,000 North Carolina militia Lincoln sent to add to the 1,000 militia that were already across the river from Augusta in South Carolina. On the way back to Savannah, Campbell turned over command of his men to Augustine Prevost's brother, Mark. The younger Prevost turned the tables on Ashe, who was following him south, surprising and very nearly destroying his force of 1,300 in the March 3 Battle of Brier Creek.

==== Second attack on Charleston ====
By April, Lincoln had been reinforced by large numbers of South Carolina militia and received additional military supplies through Dutch shipments to Charleston. He decided to move toward Augusta. Leaving 1,000 men under the command of Moultrie at Purrysburg to monitor Augustine Prevost, he began the march north on April 23. Prevost's reaction was to lead 2,500 men from Savannah toward Purrysburg on April 29. Moultrie fell back toward Charleston rather than engaging, and Prevost was within 10 miles (16 km) on May 10 before he began to see resistance. Two days later he intercepted a message indicating that Lincoln, alerted to Prevost's advance, was hurrying back from Augusta to assist in the defense of Charleston. Prevost retreated to the islands southwest of Charleston, leaving an entrenched guard at Stono Ferry (near present-day Rantowles, South Carolina) to cover his retreat. When Lincoln got back to Charleston he led about 1,200 men, mostly untried militia, after Prevost. This force was repulsed by the British on June 20 in the Battle of Stono Ferry. The rear guard, having succeeded in its objective, abandoned that post a few days later. Prevost's foray against Charleston was notable for his troop's arbitrary looting and pillaging, which enraged friend and foe alike in the South Carolina low country.

==== Defense of Savannah ====
In October 1779, French and Continental Army forces tried to retake Savannah. Under the leadership of Lincoln, and with the assistance of a French naval squadron commanded by Comte d'Estaing, it was a spectacular failure. The combined French and American forces suffered some 901 casualties, to the British 54. The French Navy found Savannah's fortifications similar to those that had defied Admiral Peter Parker at Charleston in 1776. The artillery bombardment had little effect on the defenses, but unlike Charleston—where Clinton had decided against attacking Fort Moultrie by land—Estaing decided to press the assault after the naval bombardment had failed. In this assault, Count Kazimierz Pułaski, the Polish commander of American cavalry, was fatally wounded. With Savannah secured, Clinton could launch a new assault on Charleston where he had failed in 1776. Lincoln moved his remaining troops to Charleston to assist in the construction of its defenses.

==== Third attack on Charleston ====
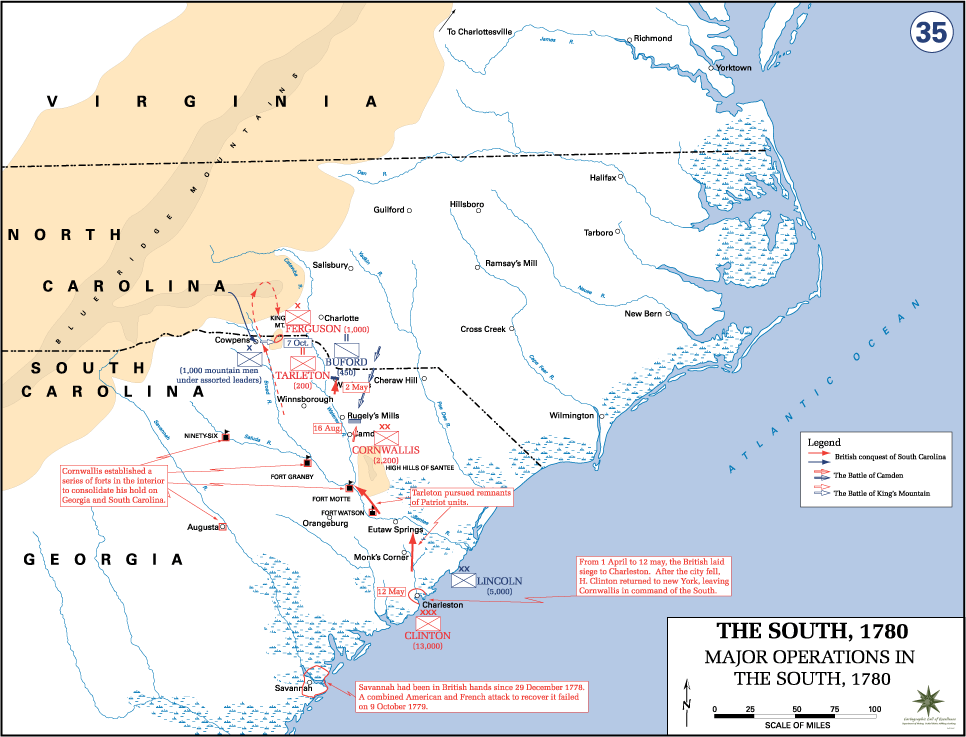
Major operations in the South during 1780

Clinton moved against Charleston, blockading the harbor in March 1780 and building up about 10,000 troops in the area. His advance on the city was uncontested; the American naval commander, Commodore Abraham Whipple, scuttled five of his eight frigates in the harbor to make a boom for its defense. Inside the city, Lincoln commanded about 2,650 Continentals and 2,500 militiamen. Tarleton blocked any hope of reinforcement or resupply with victories at Moncks Corner in April and Lenud's Ferry in early May. Charleston was surrounded. Clinton began constructing siege lines. On March 11 he commenced the bombardment of the town.

On May 12 Lincoln surrendered his 5,000 men—the largest surrender of U.S. troops until the American Civil War. With relatively few casualties, Clinton had seized the South's largest city and seaport, winning perhaps the greatest British victory of the war. This victory left the American military structure in the South in ruins. It was only after Nathanael Greene slipped past Lord Cornwallis after the Battle of Guilford Court House in 1781 that the British finally lost this advantage in the South.

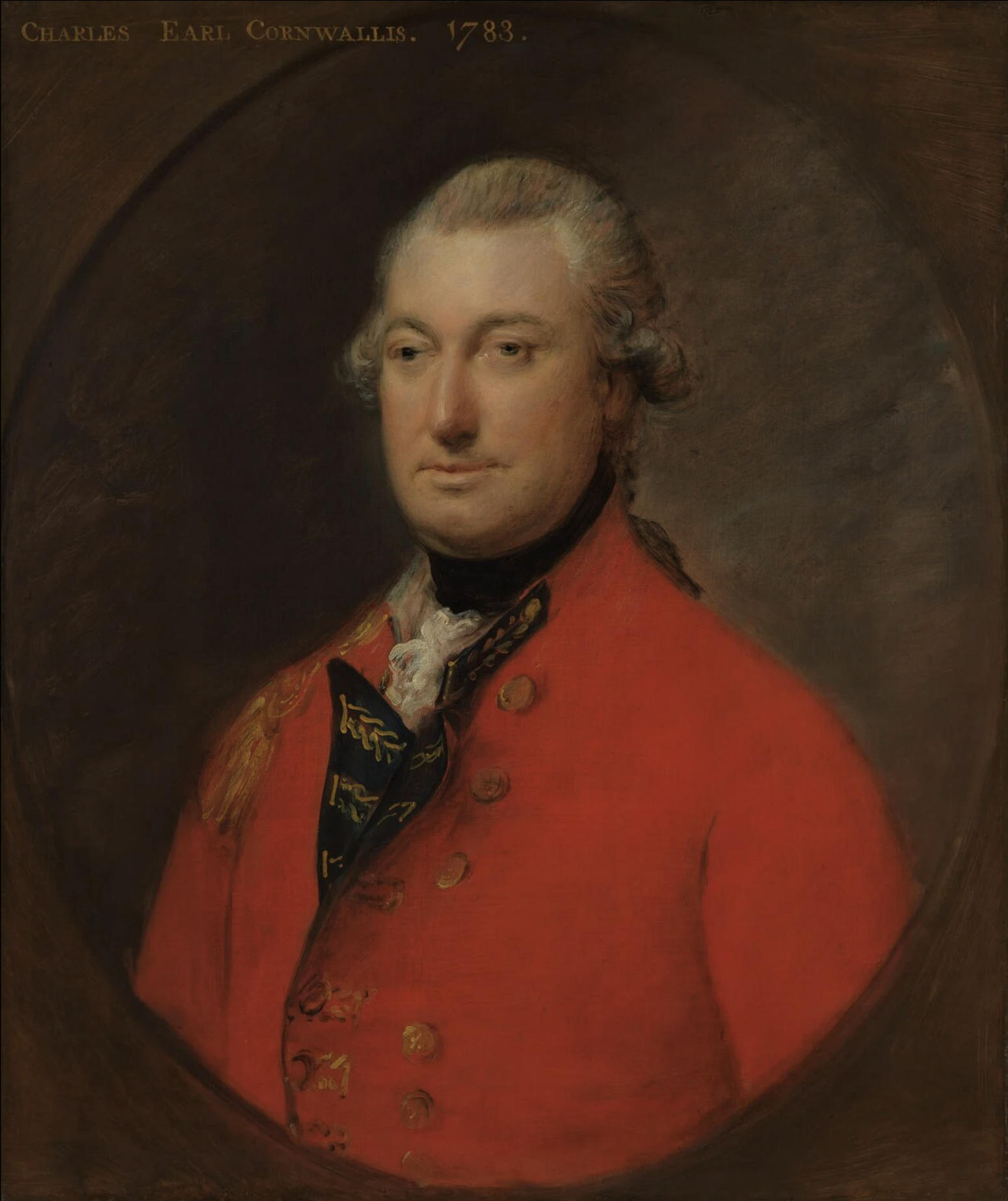
Lord Cornwallis took command when Sir Henry Clinton sailed for New York.

The remnants of the southern Continental Army began to withdraw toward North Carolina but were pursued by Tarleton's British Legion, which defeated them decisively at the Battle of Waxhaws on May 29. After the battle, Patriots alleged that Tarleton's forces had killed soldiers who were trying to surrender. The phrase "Tarleton's quarter"—referring to his reputed lack of mercy, or "quarter"—became a rallying cry for the Patriots. Historians still debate whether a massacre occurred, but the belief affected the rest of the campaign. Many Loyalist militiamen were killed by vengeful Patriots shouting "Tarleton's Quarters!" after they surrendered at the Battle of Kings Mountain on October 7. Tarleton later published an account of the war.

=== Cornwallis takes command ===
After the surrender at Charleston, organized American military activity in the South virtually collapsed. The states carried on their governmental functions, and the war was carried on by partisans such as Francis Marion, Thomas Sumter, William R. Davie, Andrew Pickens, and Elijah Clarke. Clinton turned over British operations in the South to Lord Cornwallis. The Continental Congress dispatched General Horatio Gates, the victor of Saratoga, to the South with a new army, but Gates promptly suffered one of the worst defeats in U.S. military history at the Battle of Camden on August 16, 1780. Cornwallis prepared to invade North Carolina.

Cornwallis's attempts to raise Loyalists in large numbers in North Carolina were effectively crushed after the defeat at Kings Mountain. Many of the Patriot men had crossed the Appalachian Mountains from the Washington District of North Carolina to fight the British and were so named the Overmountain Men. The British plan to raise large Loyalist armies failed—not enough Loyalists enlisted, and those who did were at high risk once the British army moved on. The defeat at Kings Mountain and the continuing harassment of his communications and supply lines by militia forces in South Carolina forced Cornwallis to withdraw and winter in South Carolina.

Gates was replaced by Washington's most dependable subordinate, General Nathanael Greene. Greene assigned about 1,000 men to General Daniel Morgan. Morgan's force defeated Tarleton's troops at the Battle of Cowpens on January 17, 1781. As after Kings Mountain, Cornwallis was later criticized for detaching part of his army without adequate support. Greene proceeded to wear down his opponents in a series of skirmishes and military movements referred to as the "Race to the Dan" (so named because the Dan River flows close to the border between North Carolina and Virginia); each encounter resulted in a tactical victory for the British but gave them no strategic advantage, while attrition took its toll.

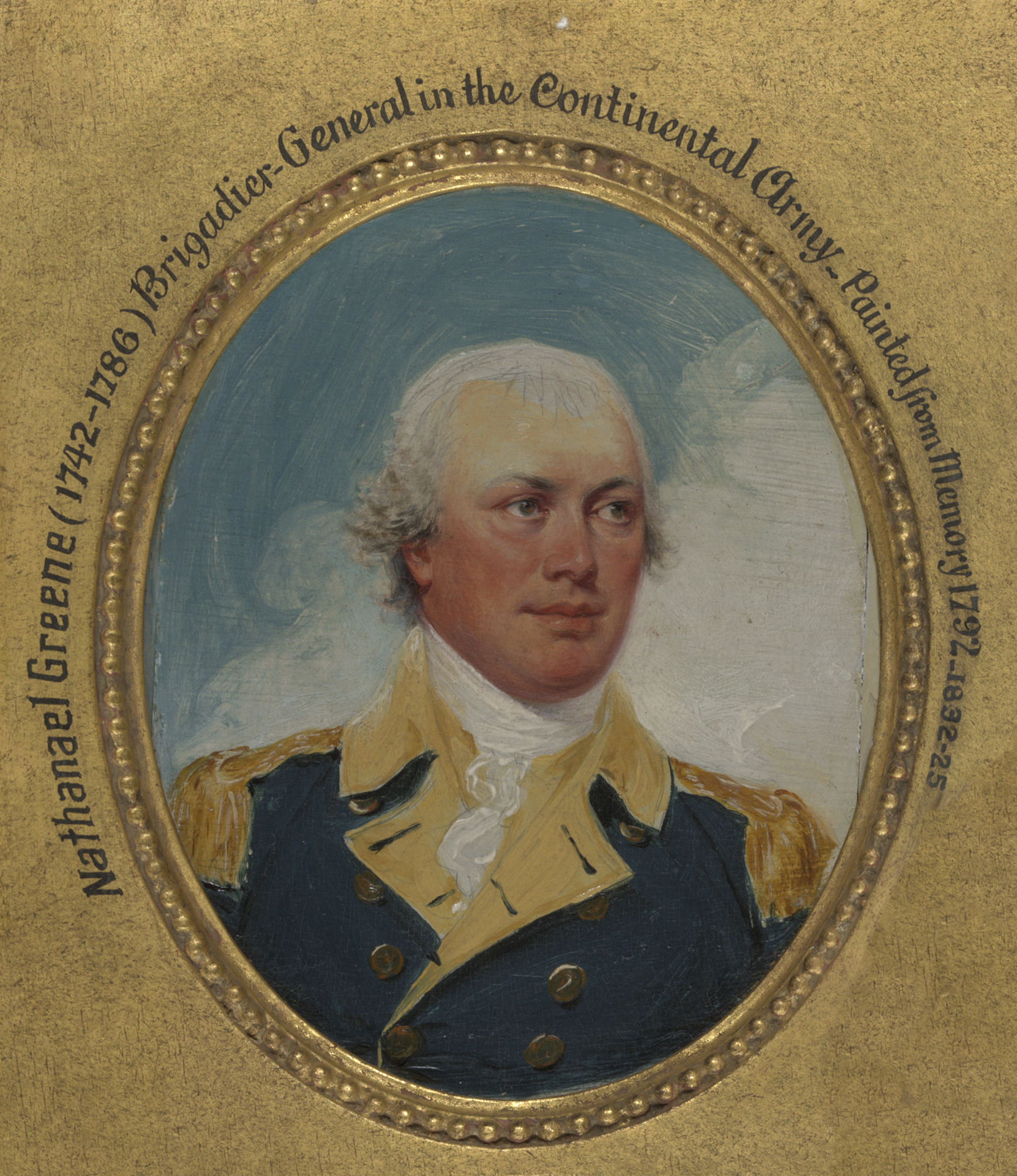
Portrait of General Nathanael Greene by John Trumbull

Cornwallis knew that Greene had divided his forces and wanted to face either Morgan's or Greene's contingent before they could rejoin. He stripped his army of all excess baggage in an effort to keep up with the fast-moving Patriots. When Greene learned of this decision, his gleeful response was "Then, he is ours!" Cornwallis's lack of provisions as a consequence played a role in his later difficulties. Greene first engaged Cornwallis in the Battle of Cowan's Ford, where Greene had sent General William Lee Davidson with 900 men. When Davidson was killed in the river, the Americans retreated. Greene was weakened, but he continued his delaying tactics, fighting a dozen more skirmishes in South and North Carolina against Cornwallis's forces. About 2,000 British troops died in these engagements. Greene summed up his approach in a motto that would become famous: "We fight, get beat, rise, and fight again." His tactics have been likened to the Fabian strategy of Quintus Fabius Maximus Verrucosus, the Roman general who wore down the superior forces of the Carthaginian Hannibal by a slow war of attrition. Greene eventually felt strong enough to face Cornwallis directly—near New Garden, North Carolina (modern day Greensboro, North Carolina). Although Cornwallis was the tactical victor in the Battle of Guilford Court House, the casualties his army suffered forced him to retreat to Wilmington, North Carolina, for resupply and reinforcements.

While Cornwallis was unable to completely destroy Greene, he recognized that most of the supplies that the American forces were relying on were coming from Virginia, a state that up to this point in the war had been relatively untouched. Against the wishes of Clinton, Cornwallis resolved to invade Virginia in the hopes that cutting the supply lines to the Carolinas would make American resistance there impossible. This theory was supported by Lord George Germain in a series of letters that left Clinton out of the decision-making process for the Southern Army, despite his nominally being its overall commander. Without informing Clinton, Cornwallis marched north from Wilmington into Virginia to engage in raiding operations, where he eventually met the army commanded by William Phillips and Benedict Arnold, which had engaged in raiding activities there. These raids resulted in massive destruction of tobacco fields and curing barns, as the colonists used tobacco to fund their war efforts. The British destruction of about 10,000 hogsheads of tobacco (roughly 10 million pounds) in 1780 and 1781 became known as the Tobacco War.

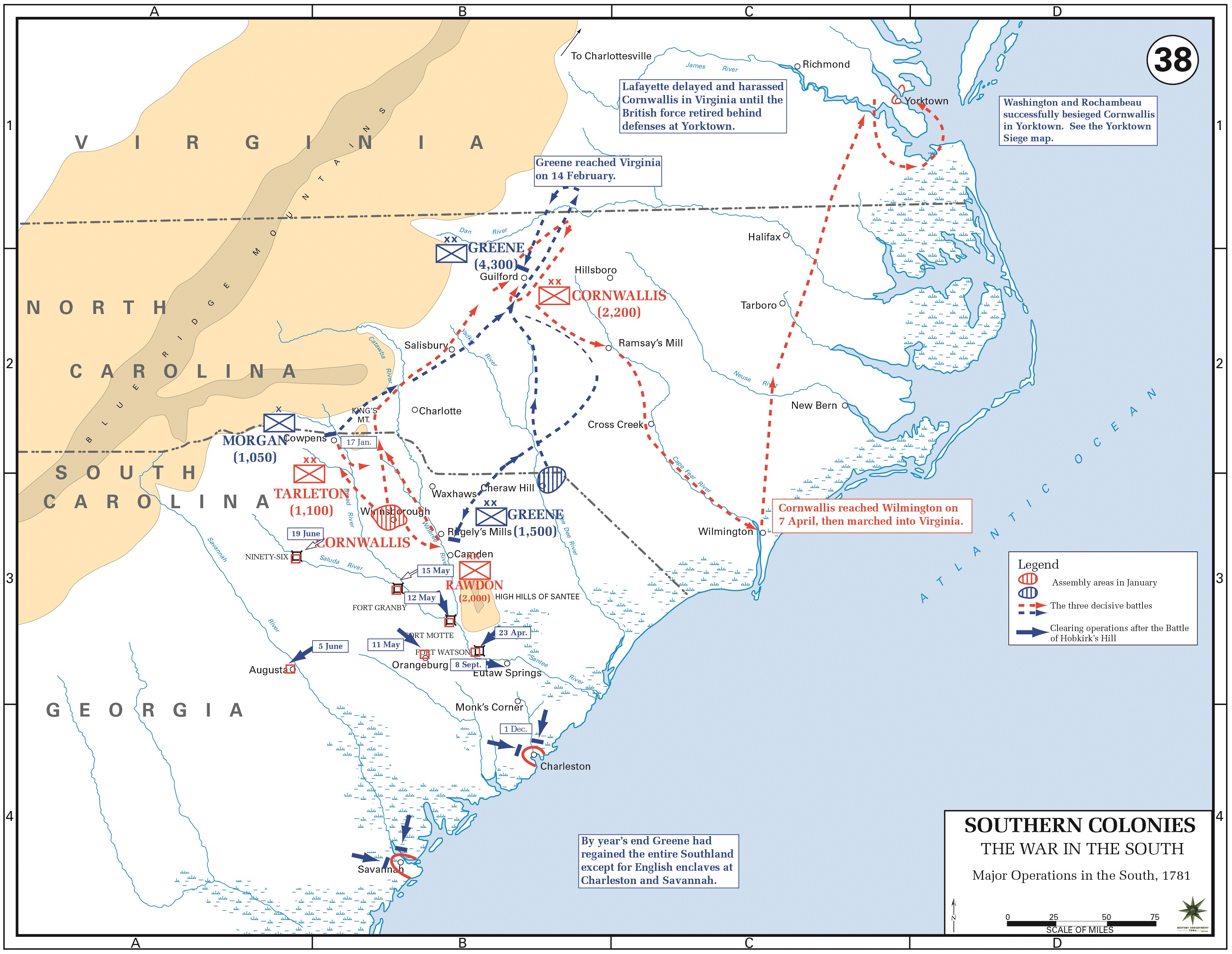
Major operations in the South during 1781

When Cornwallis left Greensboro for Wilmington, he left the road open for Greene to begin the American reconquest of South Carolina. This he achieved by the end of June, in spite of a reverse sustained at Lord Rawdon's hands at Hobkirk's Hill (2 miles north of Camden) on April 25. From May 22 to June 19, Greene led the siege of Ninety Six, which he was forced to abandon when word arrived that Rawdon was bringing troops to relieve the siege. However, the actions of Greene and militia commanders like Francis Marion drove Rawdon to eventually abandon the Ninety Six District and Camden, effectively reducing the British presence in South Carolina to the port of Charleston. Augusta was also besieged on May 22 and fell to Patriot forces under Andrew Pickens and Harry "Light Horse" Lee on June 6, reducing the British presence in Georgia to the port of Savannah.

Greene then gave his forces a six weeks' rest on the High Hills of the Santee River. On September 8, with 2,600 men, he engaged British forces under Lieutenant Colonel Alexander Stewart at Eutaw Springs. Americans who fell in this battle were immortalized by American author Philip Freneau in his 1781 poem "To the Memory of Brave Americans." The battle, although tactically a draw, so weakened the British that they withdrew to Charleston, where Greene penned them in for the remaining months of the war.

=== Yorktown ===
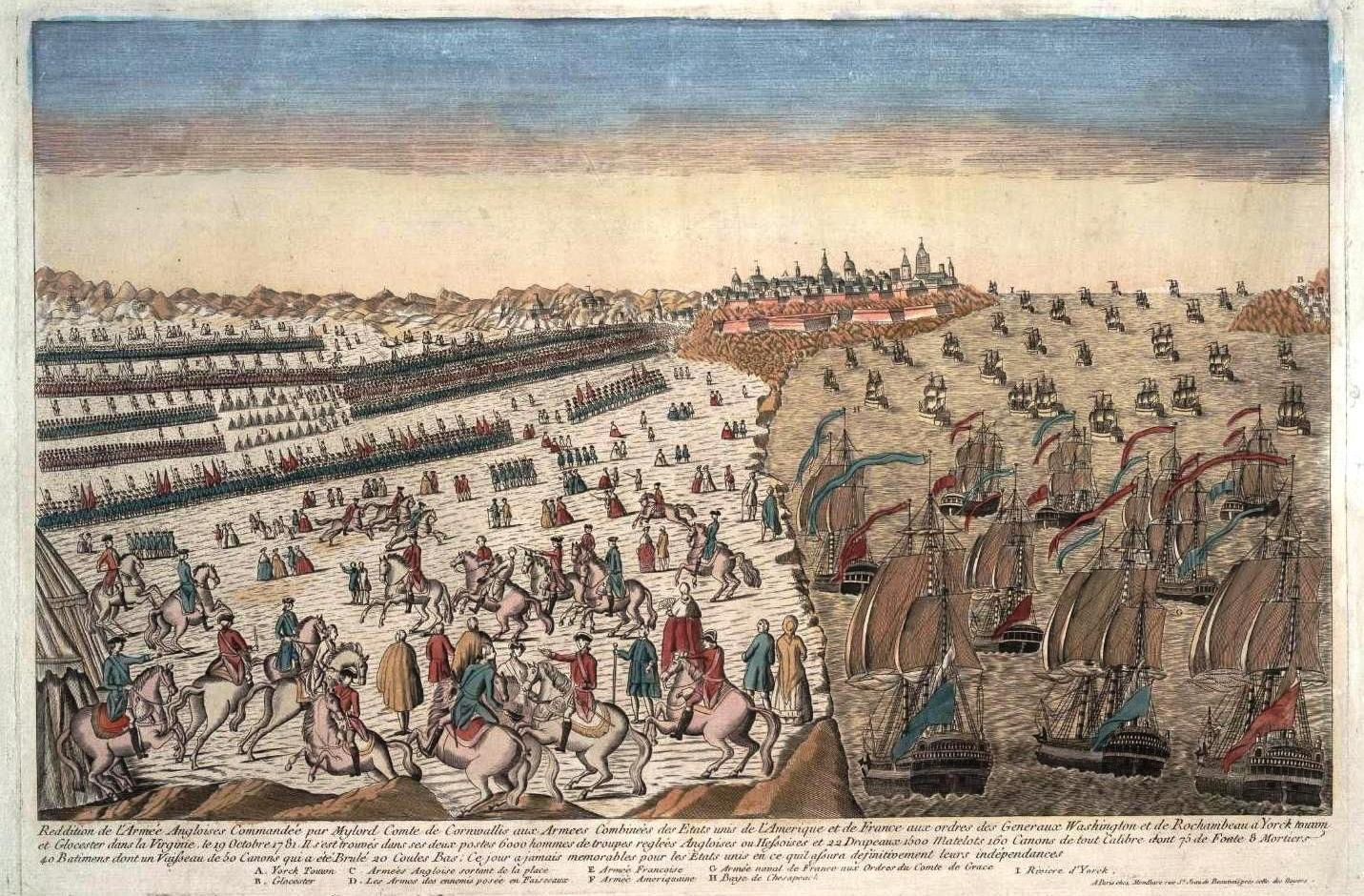
The surrender of British troops at Yorktown; French engraving; 1781

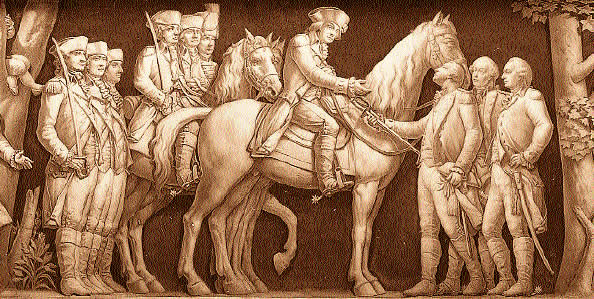
General Washington receives Cornwallis's sword from Charles O'Hara; sculpture from the facade of the Capitol Building in Washington.

Upon arrival in Virginia, Cornwallis took command of the existing British forces in the region, which had been commanded first by Arnold and then by Major General William Phillips. Phillips, a good friend of Cornwallis, died two days before Cornwallis reached his position at Petersburg. Having marched without informing Clinton of his movements (communications between the two British commanders was by sea and extremely slow, sometimes up to three weeks), Cornwallis sent word of his northward march and set about destroying American supplies in the Chesapeake region.

In March 1781, in response to the threat of Arnold and Phillips, General Washington had dispatched the Marquis de Lafayette to defend Virginia. The young Frenchman had 3,200 men at his command, but British troops in the state totaled 7,200. Lafayette skirmished with Cornwallis, avoiding a decisive battle while gathering reinforcements. It was during this period that Cornwallis received orders from Clinton to choose a position on the Virginia Peninsula—referred to in contemporary letters as the "Williamsburg Neck"—and construct a fortified naval post to shelter ships of the line. In complying with this order, Cornwallis put himself at risk to become trapped. With the arrival of the French fleet under the Comte de Grasse and Washington's combined French and American army, Cornwallis found himself cut off. When the Royal Navy fleet, under Admiral Thomas Graves, was defeated by the French at the Battle of the Chesapeake, and a French siege train arrived from Newport, Rhode Island, his position became untenable. Cornwallis surrendered to Washington and the French commander the Comte de Rochambeau on October 19, 1781.

Cornwallis reported this disaster to Clinton in a letter that opened:

I have the mortification to inform Your Excellency that I have been forced to give up the posts of York and Gloucester and to surrender the troops under my command by capitulation, on the 19th instant, as prisoners of war to the combined forces of America.

== Consequences ==
With the surrender at Yorktown, the full participation of French forces in that battle, and the resulting loss of Cornwallis's army, the British war effort ground to a halt. The sole remaining British army of any size remaining in America was that under Sir Henry Clinton in New York. Clinton, paralyzed by the defeat, made no further action and was replaced by Guy Carleton in 1782. Such a shocking reversal in fortune, coming as it had on the back of a rare naval defeat, served to increase the shift in British popular opinion against the war. The North Ministry collapsed, a peace-oriented government took power, and no further major operation on the American continent occurred for the rest of the war. While Saratoga had started the decline of British fortunes in the Revolution, Yorktown was its death knell.

== Heritage ==
The Southern Campaign of the Revolution National Heritage Corridor was established in the National Heritage Area Act in 2022. The National Heritage Area will help preserve and promote tourism at several dozen historic sites along an 8-mile-wide corridor in North Carolina and South Carolina.
