= Joseph Robinson (loyalist) =

South Carolina Loyalist, Prince Edward Island politician

Joseph Robinson (ca. 1742 – August 24, 1807) was an American-born lawyer, judge and political figure on Prince Edward Island. He served in the Legislative Assembly of Prince Edward Island from 1790 to 1794.

== Early years ==
He was born in the Province of Virginia in 1742. He prepared for entry into the Presbyterian Church in Virginia, where he received some classical education.

He moved to a colony in South Carolina where he served as justice of the peace and surveyor while managing his own plantation on the Broad River. Robinson had enslaved Africans working on the plantation and in his household. In the early 1770s, when he was in his twenties, he married Leila Whitley. They had two daughters, Rebecca and Matilda.

== American Revolutionary War ==
During the American Revolutionary War, he fought on the side of the British and served as a major and later lieutenant-colonel in the Loyalist militia. In 1775, he fought at the Battle of Ninety-Six Court-House and in some small skirmishes. With his family plantation destroyed, and his life threatened, Robinson left for East Florida. Thanks to one of the family's slaves, Sancho, his wife and their young daughters were able to join him there. They travelled hundreds of miles on horseback. From Florida they travelled to the West Indies, where once again Sancho was able to save their lives, this time following a shipwreck.

== Island of St. John ==
In 1789, one of Robinson's friends who had been the King’s American Regiment commanding officer in South Carolina, Edmund Fanning, invited Robinson to come to the Island of St. John, where Fanning was serving as the lieutenant-governor.

Robinson was named an assistant judge in the Supreme Court. He served in the Legislative Assembly of Prince Edward Island from 1790 to 1794. He served as speaker from 1790 to 1794, when he resigned his seat after being named to the Legislative Council of Prince Edward Island.

In 1796, he published the pamphlet To the farmers in the Island of St. John, in the Gulf of St. Lawrence, which raised the issue of absentee landlords who failed to pay their quit rents.

In 1797, Robinson resigned his seat on the bench to become a practising attorney.

== Slavery in Prince Edward Island ==
Colonel Robinson and then Lieutenant-Governor Edmund Fanning were both Loyalists with high social status, wealth, and slaves. When Robinson left Virginia, arriving in Prince Edward Island in 1789, he brought several slaves with him. Robinson's slaves included Sancho, Amelia Byers, her husband John (Jack) Byers—the first black couple on the island—and their three sons, Edward, John, and William. Robinson owned large tracts of agricultural land as well as large houses which were tended by enslaved people who lived on Robinson's property in separate cabins. The slaves' work included both household and farming duties. There are baptismal records for Amelia and her children at the local Church of England. In a 19 July 1800 document, Robinson clarified that the promise of potential freedom from slavery offered to Jack and Amelia, did not apply to their children. By 1825, slavery had ended on Prince Edward Island.

Robinson died in Charlottetown in 1807.
