= Andrew Williamson (soldier) =

American Revolutionary War general

- Born: 1730; Scotland
- Died: 1786 (aged 55–56); Charleston, South Carolina
- Military career
- Rank: Brigadier General
- Commands: Continental Army
- Conflicts: French and Indian War: Anglo-Cherokee War; American Revolutionary War: Rutherford Light Horse expedition; Battle of Coweecho River; Siege of Charleston

Brigadier-General Andrew Williamson (c. 1730–1786) was a Scottish-born trader, planter, and military officer. Serving in the South Carolina Militia, rising to be commissioned as brigadier general in the Continental Army in the American War of Independence. He led numerous campaigns against Loyalists and Cherokee, who in 1776 had launched an attack against frontier settlements across a front from Tennessee to central South Carolina. Williamson was particularly effective in suppressing the Cherokee, killing an unknown number of Cherokees and destroying 31 of their towns. As a result of his Indian campaign, the Cherokee ceded more than a million acres in the Carolinas.

Following the fall of Charleston to the British in 1780 after a month-long siege, and the capture of thousands of American troops, the Patriot resistance was effectively subdued in South Carolina and Georgia. Williamson, like some other officers and troops, appeared to sue for peace. While the circumstances were not clear, he appeared to be aiding the British. He was captured by Americans and gained release, moving from White Hall close to Charleston. There he was taken captive in a second American raid, but freed by British forces. After the war, Patriot General Nathanael Greene testified that Williamson had acted in Charleston to collect intelligence and pass it to the Americans; he was the "first major double agent" in America.

== Early life ==
Williamson was most likely born in Scotland. As a child he emigrated with his parents, whose names are not known, to British Colonial America. They settled on the western frontier in Ninety Six, South Carolina, which was called the Long Cane District.

Like many other Scots on the frontier, Williamson became a trader, known by 1758 to be supplying cattle and hogs to frontier forts. He may also have driven cattle to Charles Town to market. He bought a plantation, called Hard Labor, near a creek by the same name, and in Greenwood County near the settlement of Ninety Six. He renamed it as White Hall. He also purchased slaves to work the property. It was one of the few large plantations in this area. Much of the backcountry was being settled by Scots and Scots-Irish subsistence farmers, many of whom were Loyalists in the Revolution. Williamson was contracted to build a fort at Ninety Six, and later he built Fort Charlotte on the Savannah River toward North Carolina.

Williamson married Eliza "Betty" Tyler of the prominent Virginia family, and they had four surviving children together. She died in 1781 during the Revolutionary War.

In 1760, he was commissioned as lieutenant in the colonial militia, a step up to the officer corps for a man most sources agree was likely illiterate. In the early 1760s, he participated in a couple of expeditions against the Cherokee, who were raiding and harassing settlers. He supported defeating and enslaving the Cherokee. He became highly influential by the time of the Revolution, having been promoted to the rank of major, established continuing relations with Henry Laurens and other colonial leaders, and served on provincial commissions. In 1774 and 1775, he was elected to South Carolina's Provincial Congress with other men from Ninety-Six District, including Francis Salvador and Richard Rapley.

== Revolutionary War service ==
At the start of the American Revolutionary War, Williamson fortified his plantation, which he later used as his military headquarters, and as a fort, prison and arms depot. (The British added to the star fort in the settlement, as they considered this an important strategic location and wanted to control it.) There were numerous Loyalists in this part of the state.

At this time, the settlement of Ninety Six had about 10 houses, a jail and a courthouse, with a total of about 100 settlers living in the area. In November 1775, Williamson led militia in what was called the Battle of Williamson's Fort, the first battle of the Southern Campaign here, to recapture gunpowder and ammunition hijacked by Loyalists. His call attracted 532 Patriots, but soon 1500 to 2000 Loyalists were gathering outside the village against them. The forces reached a truce and casualties were light. Williamson's men were aided by their temporary fortifications at his plantation. The open warfare tended to harden loyalties, and enmities in the interior areas became vicious.

=== The Williamson campaign ===
Several months later Williamson led troops in the Battle of Twelve Mile Creek on August 1, 1776, in response to Cherokee attacks throughout the frontier since June, in which hundreds of warriors ranged across a front, attacking settlers in Virginia and the Carolinas.

Williamson's forces were ambushed five times. They regrouped, gained reinforcements, and during the fall attacked the Cherokee again, making a coordinated attack with North Carolina militia under Griffith Rutherford. The South Carolina militia destroyed the Cherokee towns of Esseneca, Keowee, Estatoe, Tugaloo and others of the lower towns. The militia also destroyed the food stores of the people in every town. The Indian campaign gathered increasing force.

Williamson was commissioned as a colonel to lead a related campaign in North Carolina, commanding 2300 men and destroying the Cherokee town of Topton in Cherokee County. In September 1776 Williamson petitioned the South Carolina legislature to allow his men to enslave Cherokee taken as captives; while the measure had some support, the legislature rejected it, worried about potential effects on the colony's men. From the Patriots' view, Williamson's campaigns were a success; the Cherokee petitioned for peace and ceded more than a million acres of land in what is now the counties of Anderson, Pickens, Oconee and Greenville in South Carolina. Alexander Chesney wrote that they destroyed 32 of the Cherokees' 62 towns.

=== Fall of Charleston ===
In 1778 Williamson was commissioned as a brigadier general in the militia. That year the Southern Campaign was intensifying, and he took part in the third Florida-Georgia expedition against the British in Florida, after the first two had failed. They intended to take the city of St. Augustine. Williamson commanded three militias and went to battle with three other commanders on the Patriot side. While they suffered short rations and a high rate of desertions on the lengthy expedition, Williamson was known to have supplied his troops better than the others. He was well-liked as a commander; the Cherokee called him "Warrior Beloved Man."

Charleston fell in 1780 after a month-long siege, and 5,000 American troops were captured. Most people felt that South Carolina and Georgia were effectively finished. "This event seemed to all, except the boldest spirits, to be the end of the American struggle in that part of South Carolina, if not in the whole state. The British regarded the country as not only conquered, but subdued." They established a garrison at Ninety Six, which had effectively surrendered, and developed an earthen star fort there. Williamson had been at Augusta, where the British avoided battle.

He queried his forces, and most of the officers and men wanted to accept British terms and take parole. The British were trying to dismantle the opposition by offering the rebels parole and protection, if they promised not to take arms against the Crown again, nor incite others to do so. Some more prominent officers and men they wanted to send to Caribbean islands for the duration.

Williamson returned to White Hall and carefully approached the British. Others of his comrades sought "peace", although surrender was not discussed. Williamson wanted to stay at his plantation, but he was considered a prize by the British. He was said to try to persuade other leaders in South Carolina to follow his lead, specifically Pickens, Hammond, Bowie and Rapley. Historian Llewellyn M. Toulmin's conclusion, based on the documentation and Williamson's actions, is that he had taken protection and was assisting the British, including supplying them. Several other leading officers sought peace with the British.

Some later returned to the Rebel side, angered as the British tried to have senior officers rally younger men against the American cause. In addition, Loyalists had caused damage in the district and aroused hostility.

His former compatriots considered Williamson a traitor. They twice took him prisoner to persuade him to reconsider, but he regained his freedom. He moved closer to Charleston, where the British gave him a plantation. Williamson was taken prisoner a second time, by a raiding party led by Colonel Isaac Hayne. They were intercepted within 24 hours by a British column, who freed Williamson and took Hayne prisoner. "[T]he British hanged Col. Hayne on 4 August 1781 because he (like Williamson) had given his pledge to the British to not fight against them. Unlike Williamson, Hayne had violated his parole (in the eyes of the British) by taking up arms again" so they hanged him as an example. This brought more notoriety to Williamson. He stayed within the British lines until the end of the war.

After the war, the South Carolina General Assembly voted to confiscate Williamson's White Hall plantation. In a published list of those who were to lose their properties, Williamson was classified among eleven "obnoxious persons" for his actions. But, Patriot General Nathanael Greene testified that Williamson was not a turncoat but had been providing intelligence on the British to the Continental Army, and the former general was able to recover some standing. He was not able to return to his beloved White Hall, however, since it was too dangerous for him to live upcountry. (White Hall eventually disappeared and has been the object of unsuccessful search by descendants, state and Federal archaeologists.)

Williamson died in Charleston in 1786. To his contemporaries and down to the present day, Williamson is a controversial figure. Historian Llewellyn M. Toulmin has written of Williamson, "Because of his high rank and important information that he passed on for almost a year, he can fairly be described as 'America's first major double agent.'"
