= Fort Johnson (South Carolina) =

Archaeological site in South Carolina, United States

- U.S. National Register of Historic Places
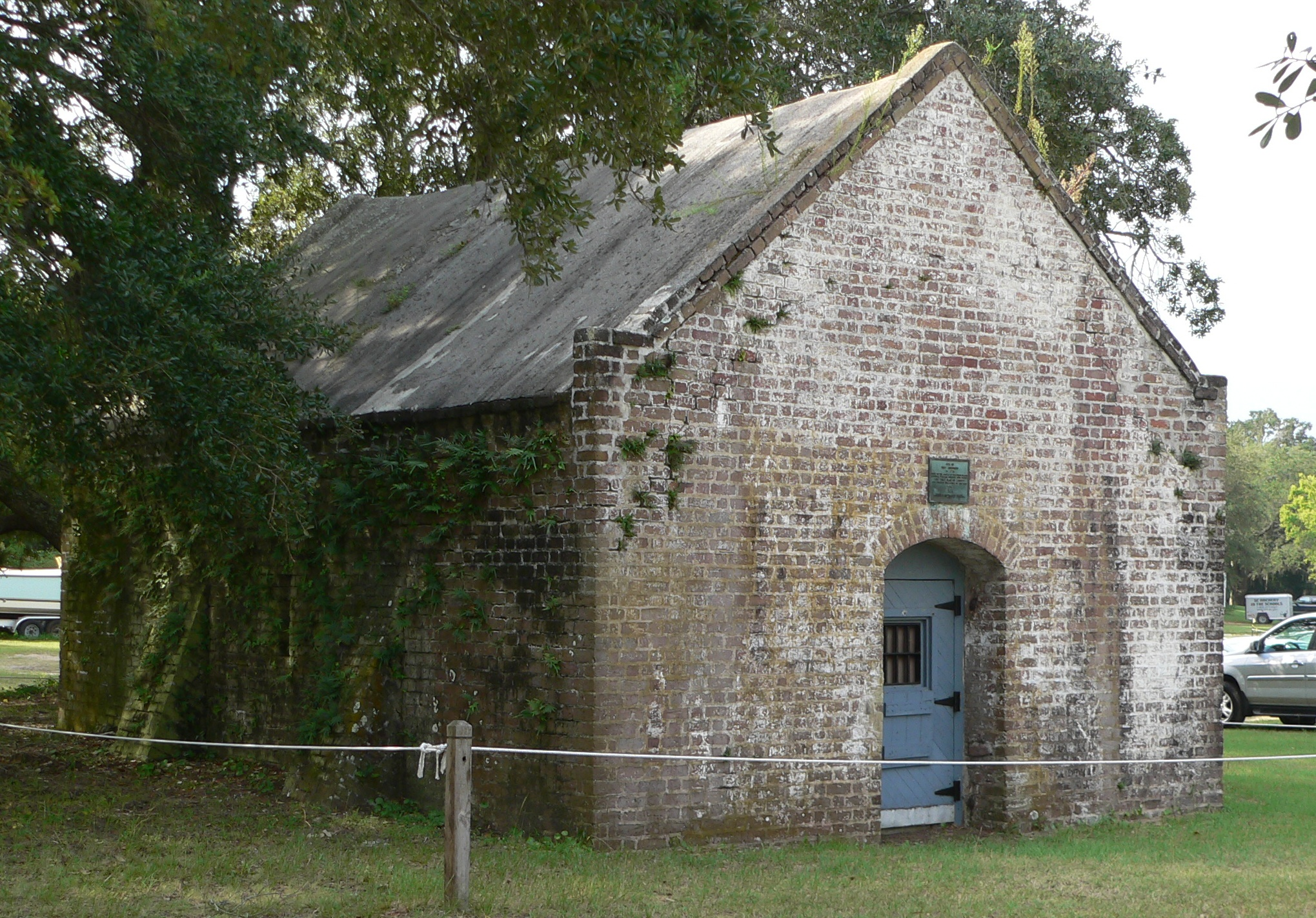
- The Old Magazine, photographed in 2011.

- Location within South Carolina Location within the United States
- Location: East end of Ft. Johnson Road, in South Carolina Department of Natural Resources compound, James Island, South Carolina
- Coordinates: 32°45′8″N 79°53′55″W
- Area: 90 acres (36 ha)
- Built: 1765
- NRHP reference No.: 72001197
- Added to NRHP: September 14, 1972

Fort Johnson is a state-owned historic site of military and political significance located on the northeast point of James Island in Charleston County, South Carolina.

== History ==
Fort Johnson was strategically important during the colonial era, as it was located on the banks of the Ashley River. The fort was named after Sir Nathaniel Johnson, who served as the Governor of Carolina from 1703 to 1709. It was the site of the first raising of the South Carolina state flag in 1775. The magazine was built in 1765 and is a brick structure that measures 27 feet long and 20 feet wide.

In 1861 the guns of Fort Johnson were within firing range of nearby Fort Sumter. These guns were heavily relied upon during the initial Confederate capture of Fort Sumter on April 13, 1861. Later on in the American Civil War the fort was buried by Confederate soldiers. In 1931 it was uncovered. Fort Johnson and the magazine were listed on the National Register of Historic Places in 1972.
