= Horry-Guignard House =

Historic house in South Carolina, United States

- U.S. National Register of Historic Places
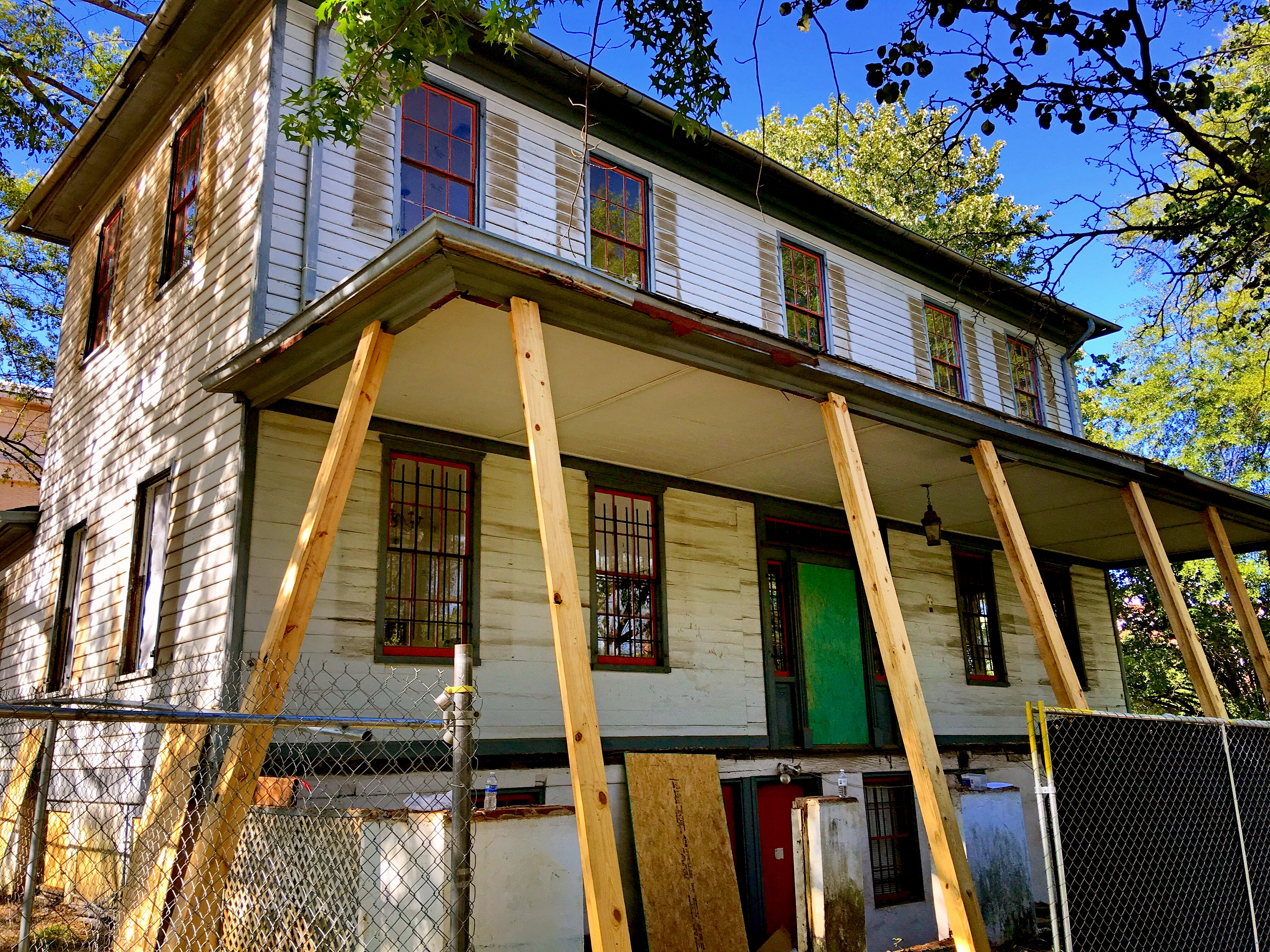

- Location within South Carolina Location within the United States
- Location: 1527 Senate St., Columbia, South Carolina
- Coordinates: 34°0′6″N 81°1′38″W
- Area: 0.3 acres (0.12 ha)
- Built: c. 1813
- Architectural style: Late Federal
- NRHP reference No.: 71000802
- Added to NRHP: May 6, 1971

Horry-Guignard House is a historic home located at Columbia, South Carolina. It was built before 1813, and is a two-story, late Federal style, modified I-house type frame dwelling. The front facade features a one-story, full-width balustraded porch supported by square columns. During the winter of 1813–1814, the main hall was widened from six feet to eleven feet. To do this, the house was sawed in half and the two ends were pulled apart to rest on two new foundations. It was probably built by Peter Horry (1747-1815), a Revolutionary War Colonel and Brigadier General of the South Carolina Militia. Later, the house was acquired by John Gabriel Guignard (1751-1822), the Surveyor General of South Carolina from 1798 to 1802. Guignard is responsible for the early design of the city and laid out the first streets of Columbia.

According to urban legend, the house was spared during the civil war by General Sherman's troops thanks to the cooking of a slave named Dilcie. While the owners of the house at that time had fled before the Union troops stormed the city, Dilcie remained in the home. She sought General Sherman at his headquarters and invited him to dinner, promising the best cooking in Columbia. Apparently Sherman was impressed because he ordered the home be spared as a gesture of gratitude.

It was added to the National Register of Historic Places in 1971.

In 2016, the fire department responded to the house after heavy smoke and fire was observed coming from the building. Firefighters were able to extinguish the fire and save the house from destruction.

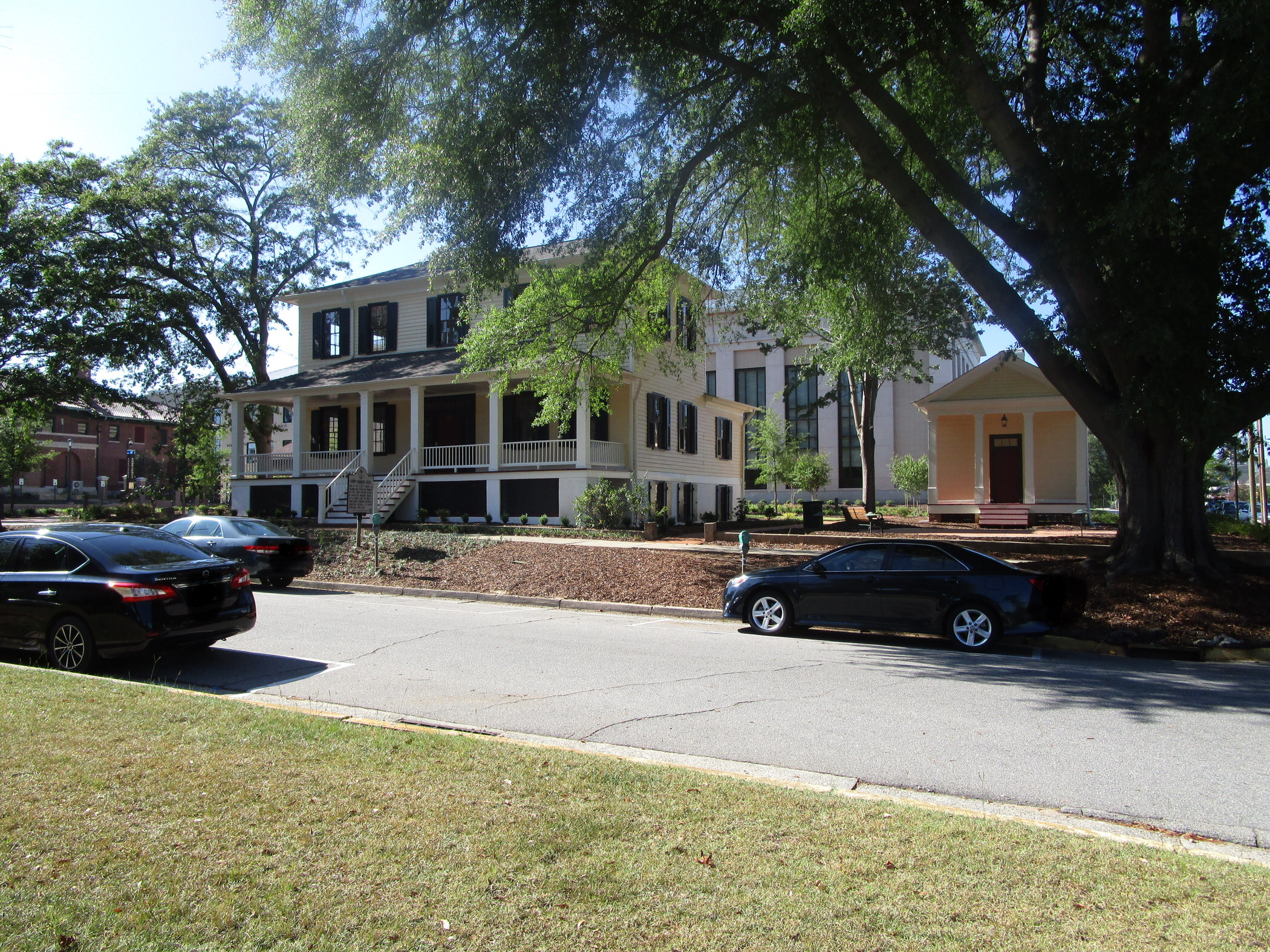
Front of House; Senate Street Side

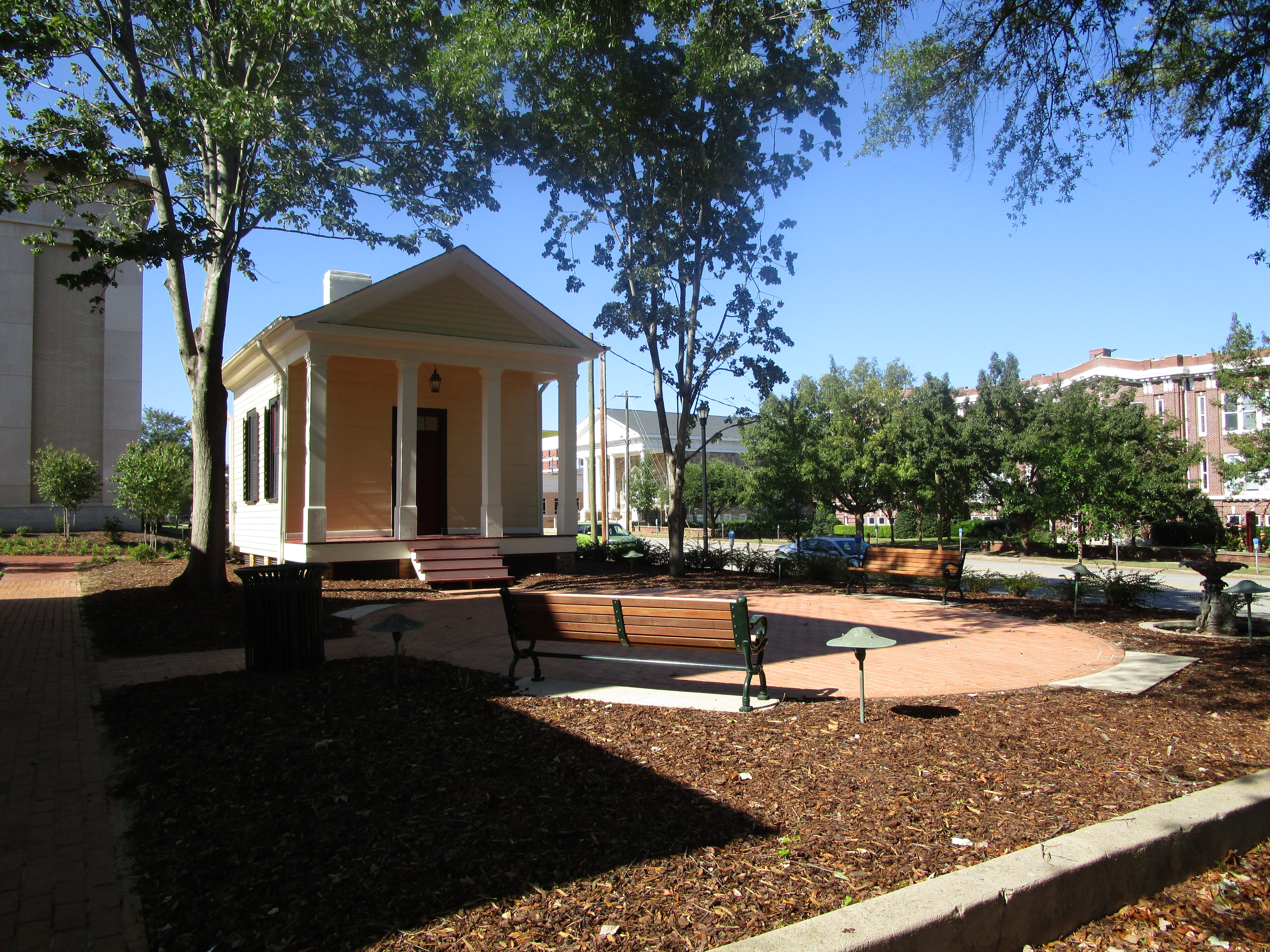
Horry-Guignard Outbuilding

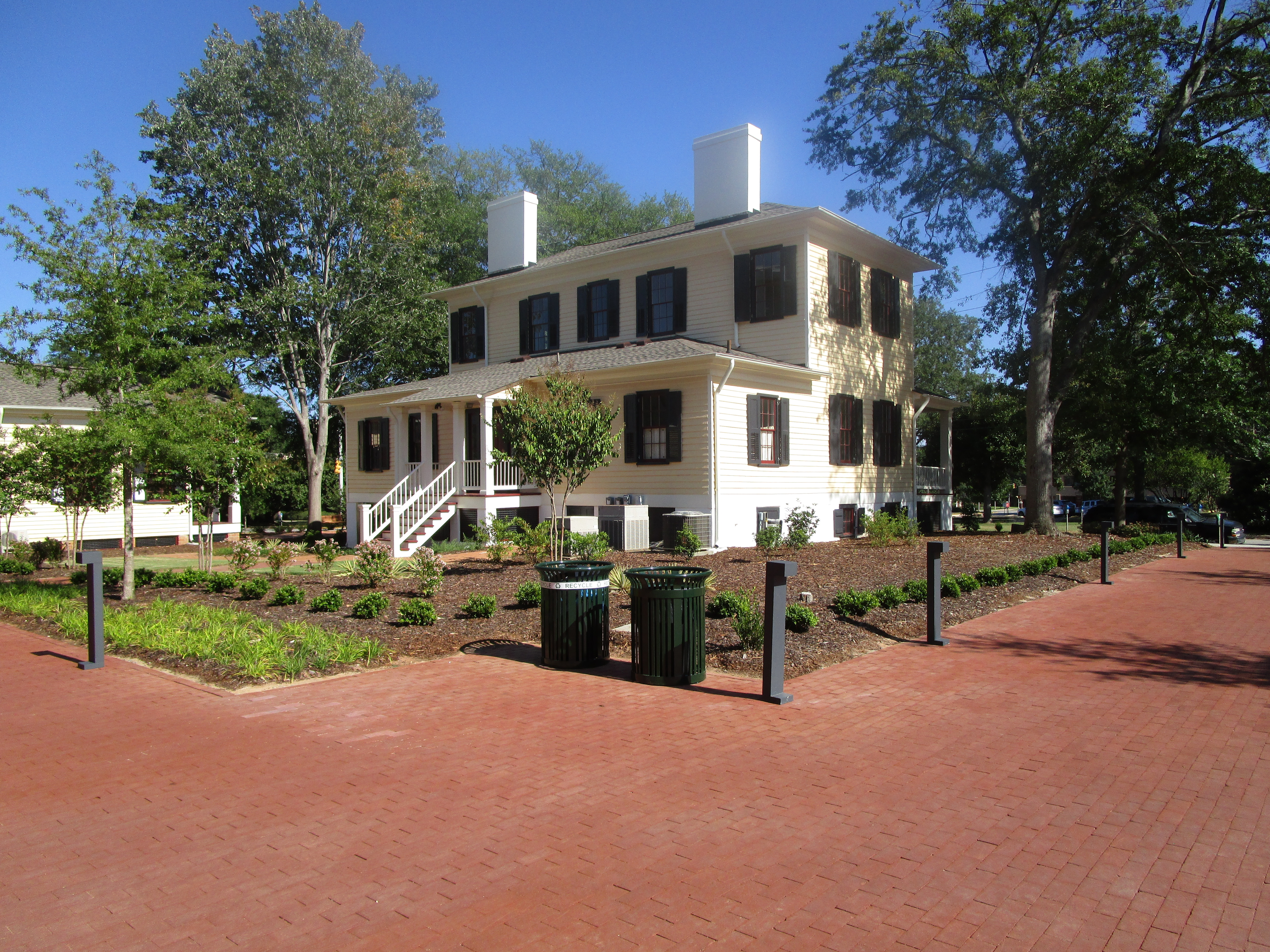
Rear side

The house and an outbuilding, which is believed to have been an office built sometime between 1822 and 1876, is currently being restored as part of the University of South Carolina School of Law complex.
