= North Carolina General Assembly of 1775 =

1775 meeting of the North Carolina General Assembly

←
Prior
- North Carolina General Assembly of 1774 (March 2–24, 1774)
- 2nd North Carolina Provincial Congress (April 3–7, 1775)
After
- 3rd North Carolina Provincial Congress (August 20, 1775)
→
- Governor's Palace, Newbern

Overview
- Legislative body: General Assembly
- Jurisdiction: North Carolina
- Meeting place: New Bern, North Carolina
- Term: 1775

Executive Council
- Lieutenant Governor: George Mercer
- Chief Baron of the Exchequer: James Hasell
- Receiver General: John Rutherford
- Clerk: Samuel Strudwick
- Attorney General: Thomas McGuire

House of Burgesses
- Members: 93 Delegates authorized (21 vacancies, 34 counties, 9 Towns)
- Speaker: John Harvey
- Clerk: James Green, Jr.
- Assistant Clerk: James Glasgow
- Mace Bearer: Benjamin Fordham

Sessions
- 1st: April 4, 1775 – April 8, 1775

The North Carolina General Assembly of 1775 was a bicameral legislative body of North Carolina that met from April 4, 1775 to April 8, 1775 in New Bern. The upper house of the legislature was the Executive Council, which was appointed by The Crown as was the governor, Josiah Martin. The lower house, the House of Burgesses, was elected by the eligible voters of the 34 counties and nine major towns as certified by the local sheriff.

This was the fourth House of Burgesses and the final provincial general assembly meeting that took place in North Carolina under The Crown. They met at the same time and with virtually the same representation as the Second North Carolina Provincial Congress, which met in New Bern on April 3 to April 7, 1775. Because the House of Burgesses approved the Continental Congress that was to be held in Philadelphia on May 10, 1775, Governor Martin and the Executive Council issued a proclamation dissolving the House of Burgesses on April 8, 1775.

== Council ==
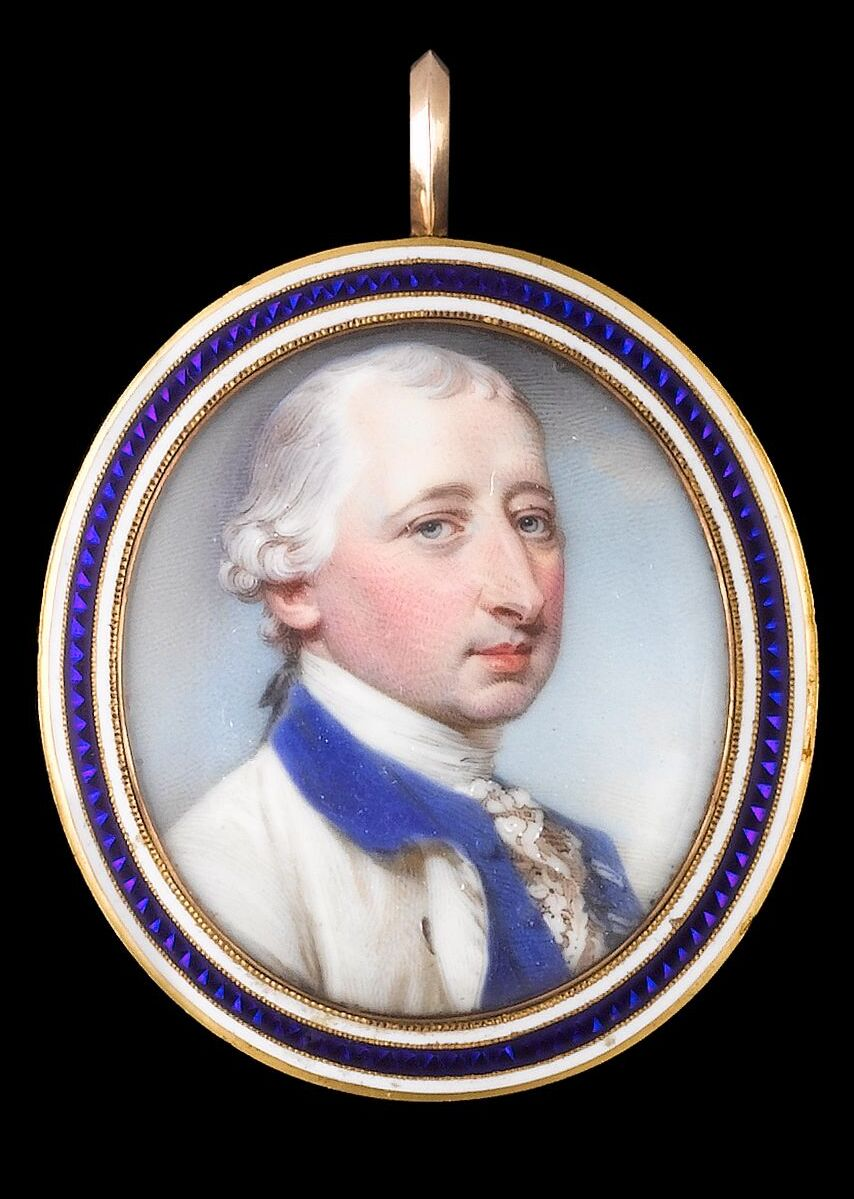
Josiah Martin, Governor

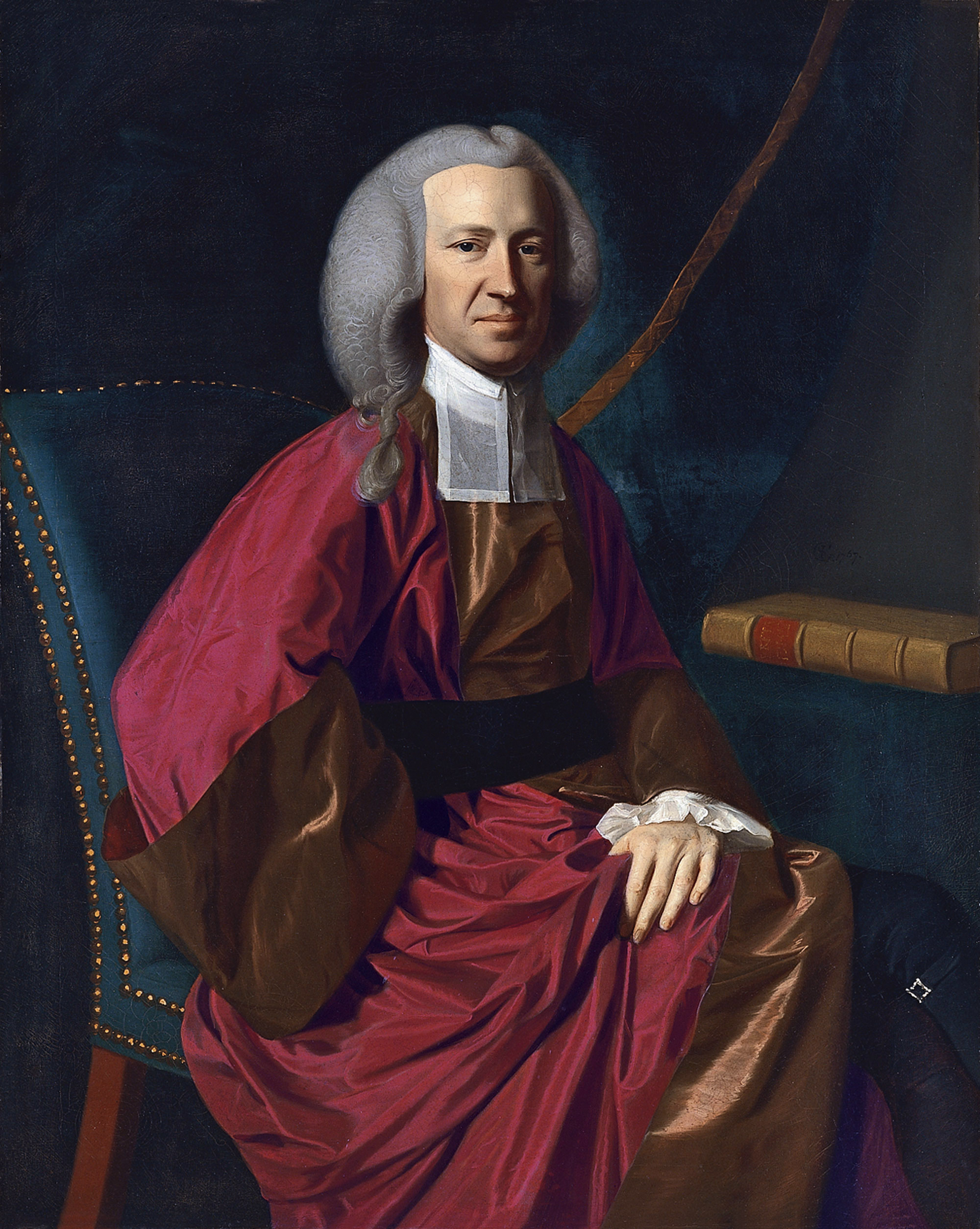
Martin Howard, Council

The last governor of the Province of North Carolina was Josiah Martin, who served from 1771 to 1776. His Executive Council, which was the upper house of the general assembly and advisor to the governor, included the following members:

- Samuel Cornell
- William Dry
- George Mercer (Lieutenant Governor)
- James Hasell (Chief Baron of the Exchequer, Acting Governor of the Province of North Carolina in 1771)
- Martin Howard
- Alexander McCulloch
- Robert Palmer
- John Rutherfurd (Receiver General)
- Lewis Henry De Rosset
- John Sampson
- Samuel Strudwick (Clerk)
- Thomas McGuire (Attorney General)

Governor Josiah Martin and the Executive Council issued a proclamation on April 8, 1775 dissolving the Province of North Carolina's General Assembly after the House of Burgesses presented a resolve endorsing the Continental Congress that was to be held in Philadelphia, Pennsylvania. The Executive Council met on June 25, 1775 at Fort Johnston in Brunswick County. By this time sedition was rampant and many were under arms. As the Council met for the last time onboard HMS Cruizer in the Cape Fear River on July 18, 1775, they noted that the "deluded people of this Province" will see their error and return to their allegiance to the King.

== House of Burgesses ==
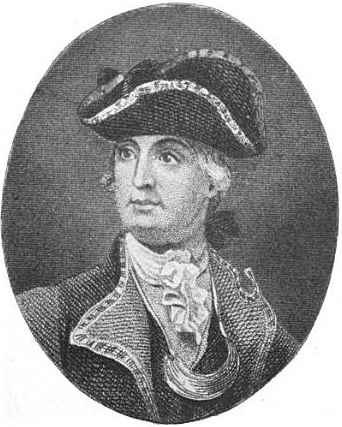
Robert Howe, Brunswick County

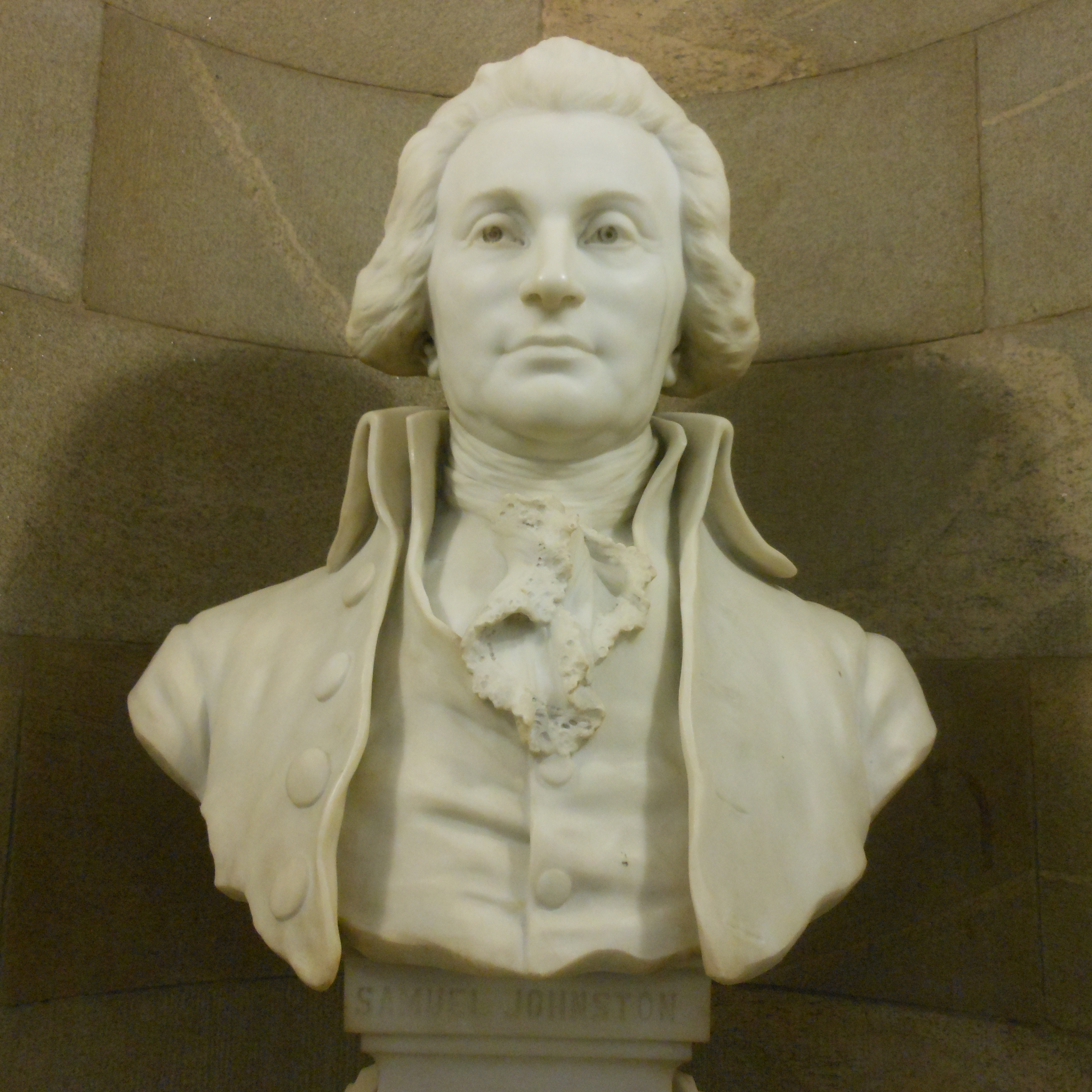
Samuel Johnston, Chowan County

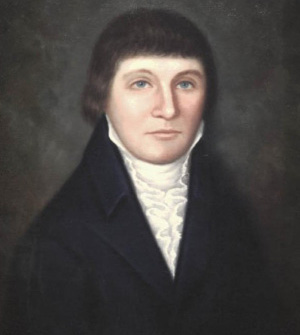
Richard Caswell, Dobbs County

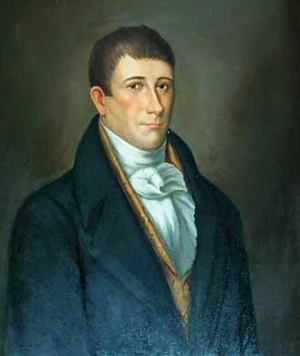
Benjamin Williams, Johnston County

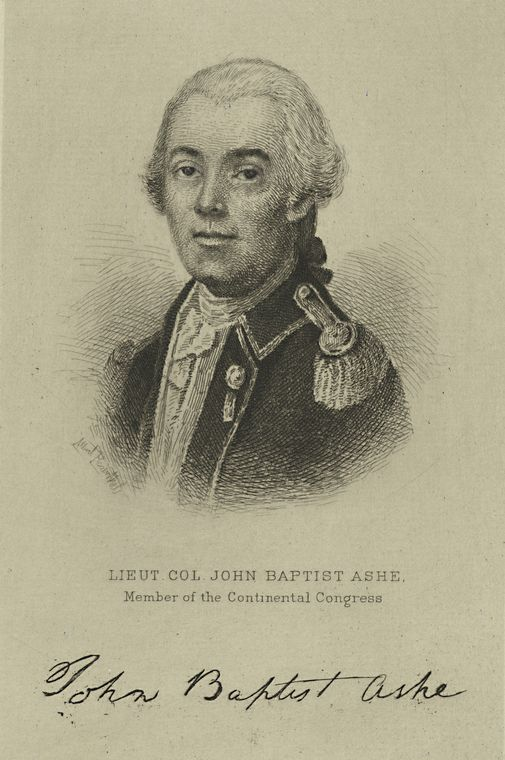
John Baptista Ashe, New Hanover County

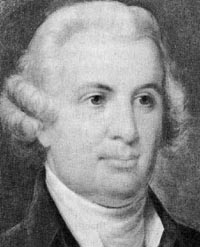
William Hooper, New Hanover County

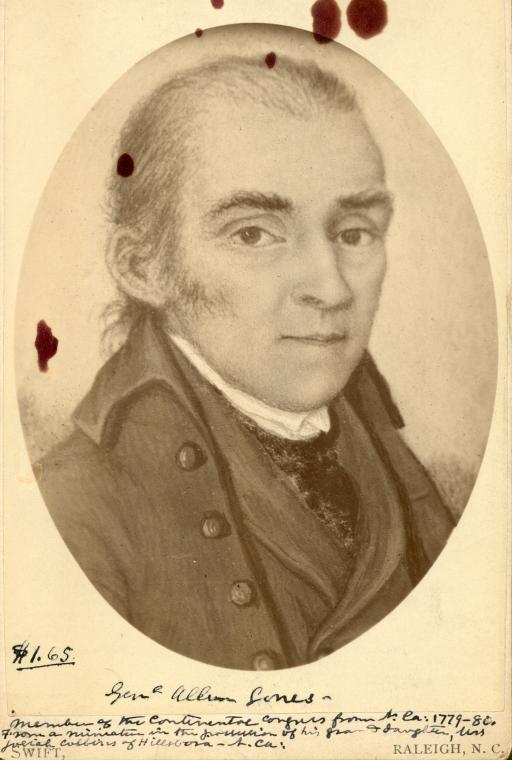
Allen Jones, Northampton County

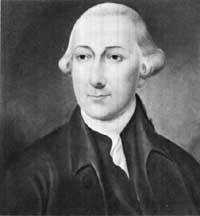
Joseph Hewes, Edenton

The delegates to the House of Burgesses represented the 34 counties and nine Towns. The number of delegates from the counties was determined by the population and varied from one to four. Each town had one delegate. Elections were certified by the county sheriffs. The delegates are listed below. John Harvey was elected speaker of the House of Burgesses by his fellow delegates.

County/Town	Delegate
Anson County, North Carolina	Unknown / Vacant
Anson County, North Carolina	Unknown / Vacant
Beaufort County, North Carolina	Roger Ormond
Beaufort County, North Carolina	Thomas Respess Jr.
Bertie County, North Carolina	John Campbell
Bertie County, North Carolina	John Johnston
Bertie County, North Carolina	David Stanley
Bladen County, North Carolina	William Saltar
Bladen County, North Carolina	James White
Brunswick County, North Carolina	Robert Howe
Brunswick County, North Carolina	John Rowan
Bute County, North Carolina	Green Hill
Bute County, North Carolina	William Person
Carteret County, North Carolina	Solomon Shepard
Carteret County, North Carolina	William Thompson
Chatham County, North Carolina	Unknown / Vacant
Chatham County, North Carolina	Unknown / Vacant
Chowan County, North Carolina	Thomas Benbury
Chowan County, North Carolina	Thomas Hunter
Chowan County, North Carolina	Samuel Johnston
Chowan County, North Carolina	Thomas Jones
Chowan County, North Carolina	Thomas Oldham
Craven County, North Carolina	James Coor
Craven County, North Carolina	Lemuel Hatch
Cumberland County, North Carolina	Farquard Campbell
Cumberland County, North Carolina	Thomas Rutherford
Currituck County, North Carolina	Samuel Jarvis
Currituck County, North Carolina	Nathan Joyner
Currituck County, North Carolina	Thomas McKnight
Currituck County, North Carolina	Solomon Perkins
Currituck County, North Carolina	Francis Williamson
Dobbs County, North Carolina	Richard Caswell
Dobbs County, North Carolina	William McKinnie
Duplin County, North Carolina	Thomas Gray
Duplin County, North Carolina	Thomas Hicks
Edgecombe County, North Carolina	Elisha Battle
Edgecombe County, North Carolina	William Haywood
Granville County, North Carolina	Memucan Hunt
Granville County, North Carolina	Thomas Person
Guilford County, North Carolina	Vacant (Note: Election results were not returned and the seats remained vacant.)
Guilford County, North Carolina	Vacant
Halifax County, North Carolina	Nicholas Long
Halifax County, North Carolina	Benjamin McCulloch
Hertford County, North Carolina	William Murfree
Hertford County, North Carolina	George Wynns
Hyde County, North Carolina	Unknown / Vacant
Hyde County, North Carolina	Unknown / Vacant
Johnston County, North Carolina	Needham Bryan
Johnston County, North Carolina	Benjamin Williams
Mecklenburg County, North Carolina	Unknown / Vacant
Mecklenburg County, North Carolina	Unknown / Vacant
New Hanover County, North Carolina	John Baptista Ashe
New Hanover County, North Carolina	William Hooper
Northampton County, North Carolina	Colonel Jeptha Atherton
Northampton County, North Carolina	Allen Jones
Onslow County, North Carolina	William Cray
Onslow County, North Carolina	Henry Rhodes
Orange County, North Carolina	Thomas Hart
Orange County, North Carolina	Ralph McNair
Pasquotank County, North Carolina	Edward Everagin
Pasquotank County, North Carolina	Jonathan Herring
Pasquotank County, North Carolina	Joseph Jones
Pasquotank County, North Carolina	Isaac Gregory
Pasquotank County, North Carolina	Joseph Reading
Perquimans County, North Carolina	John Harvey (Speaker)
Perquimans County, North Carolina	Thomas Harvey
Perquimans County, North Carolina	Andrew Knox
Perquimans County, North Carolina	John Whedbee
Perquimans County, North Carolina	Unknown / Vacant
Pitt County, North Carolina	Edward Salter
Pitt County, North Carolina	John Simpson
Rowan County, North Carolina	Unknown / Vacant
Rowan County, North Carolina	Unknown / Vacant
Surry County, North Carolina	Unknown / Vacant
Surry County, North Carolina	Unknown / Vacant
Tryon County, North Carolina	William Alston
Tryon County, North Carolina	William Moore
Tyrrell County, North Carolina	Jeremiah Frazier
Tyrrell County, North Carolina	Benjamin Spruill
Tyrrell County, North Carolina	Joseph Spruill
Tyrrell County, North Carolina	Unknown / Vacant
Tyrrell County, North Carolina	Unknown / Vacant
Wake County, North Carolina	Unknown / Vacant
Wake County, North Carolina	Unknown / Vacant
Bath Town	William Brown
Brunswick Town	Parker Quince
Campbellton Town (became Fayetteville in 1783)	Robert Rowan
Edenton Town	Joseph Hewes
Halifax Town	Unknown / Vacant
Hillsborough Town	Francis Nash
New Bern Town	Isaac Edwards (Note: Isaac Edwards died before taking his seat and the seat remained vacant.)
Salisbury Town	Unknown / Vacant
Wilmington Town	Cornelius Harnett
