= Second North Carolina Provincial Congress =

1775 meeting in Craven, North Carolina

←	1st	3rd	→

Overview
- Legislative body: North Carolina Provincial Congress
- Jurisdiction: North Carolina (de facto)
- Meeting place: Craven Court House
- Term: April 3, 1775 – April 7, 1775

Provincial Congress
- Members: 107 delegates
- Moderator: Col. John Harvey

Sovereign
- Monarch: HM George III
- Governor: HE Josiah Martin

The Second North Carolina Provincial Congress was a meeting of the provincial congress of the de facto provincial government of North Carolina, composed of 107 delegates from 33 counties (three not being represented) and nine towns. The congress convened in Newbern, on April 3, 1775, and ended on April 7, 1775, during the final two years of Josiah Martin's gubernatorial administration. Colonel John Harvey was unanimously chosen as moderator.

== History ==
The Second Provincial Congress met at Newbern, from April 3 to 7, 1775. John Harvey served as moderator. The congress met at the same place and almost the same time as the North Carolina provincial assembly and had almost exactly the same membership (61 of the 107 delegates attended both). This infuriated Governor Josiah Martin, who prorogued the House of Burgesses on April 8, 1775, and never called another.

=== Resolutions ===
The Second Provincial Congress approved the Continental Association, an economic boycott of Great Britain authorized by the First Continental Congress. Just after the congress met, news reached North Carolina about the Battle of Lexington and Concord in Massachusetts. On May 24, 1775, British governor Josiah Martin fled the Governor's Palace at Newbern, ending sixty-three continuous years of colonial rule. The first military action of the American Revolutionary War within North Carolina took place on July 18, 1775, when the provincial militia burned Fort Johnston, North Carolina, where Governor Martin had previously transferred his headquarters.

=== Delegates ===
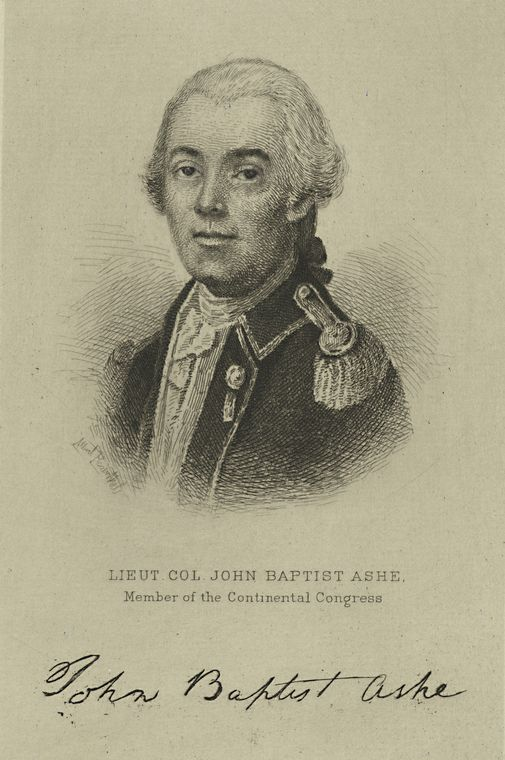
John Baptista Ashe, New Hanover County

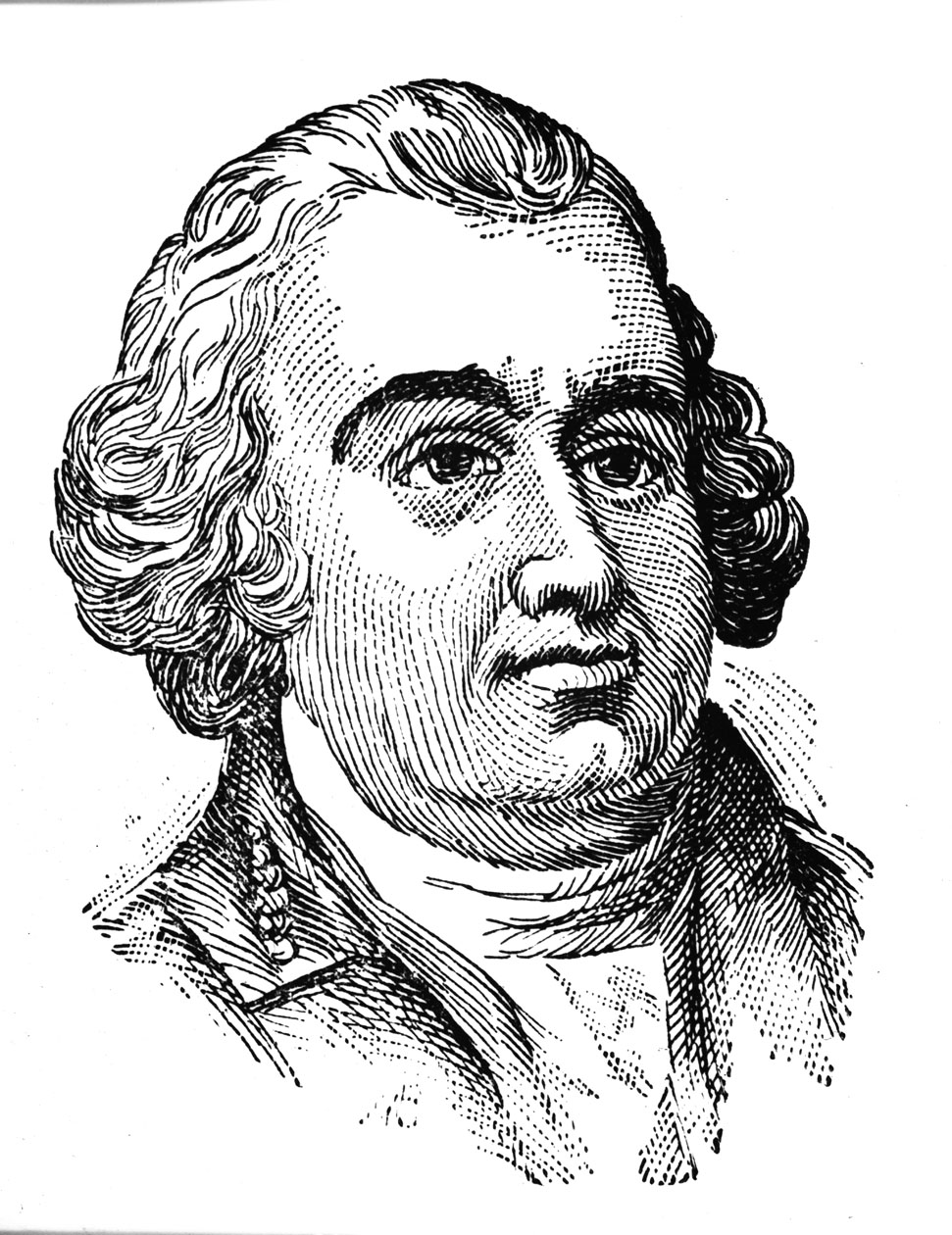
Thomas Burke, Orange County

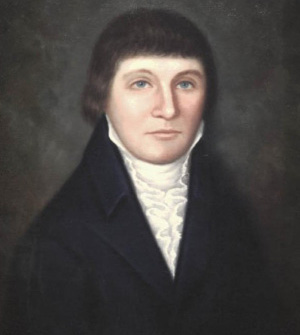
Richard Caswell, Dobbs County

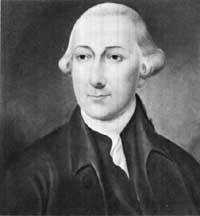
Joseph Hewes, Edenton

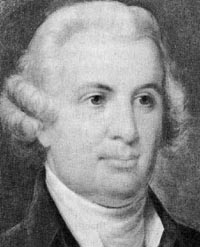
William Hooper, New Hanover County

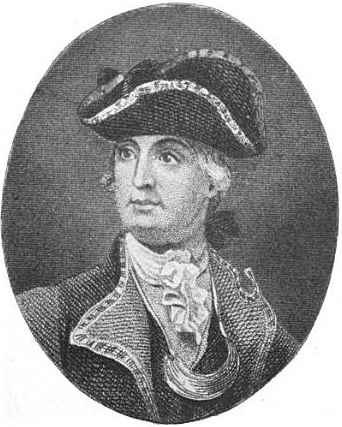
Robert Howe, Brunswick County

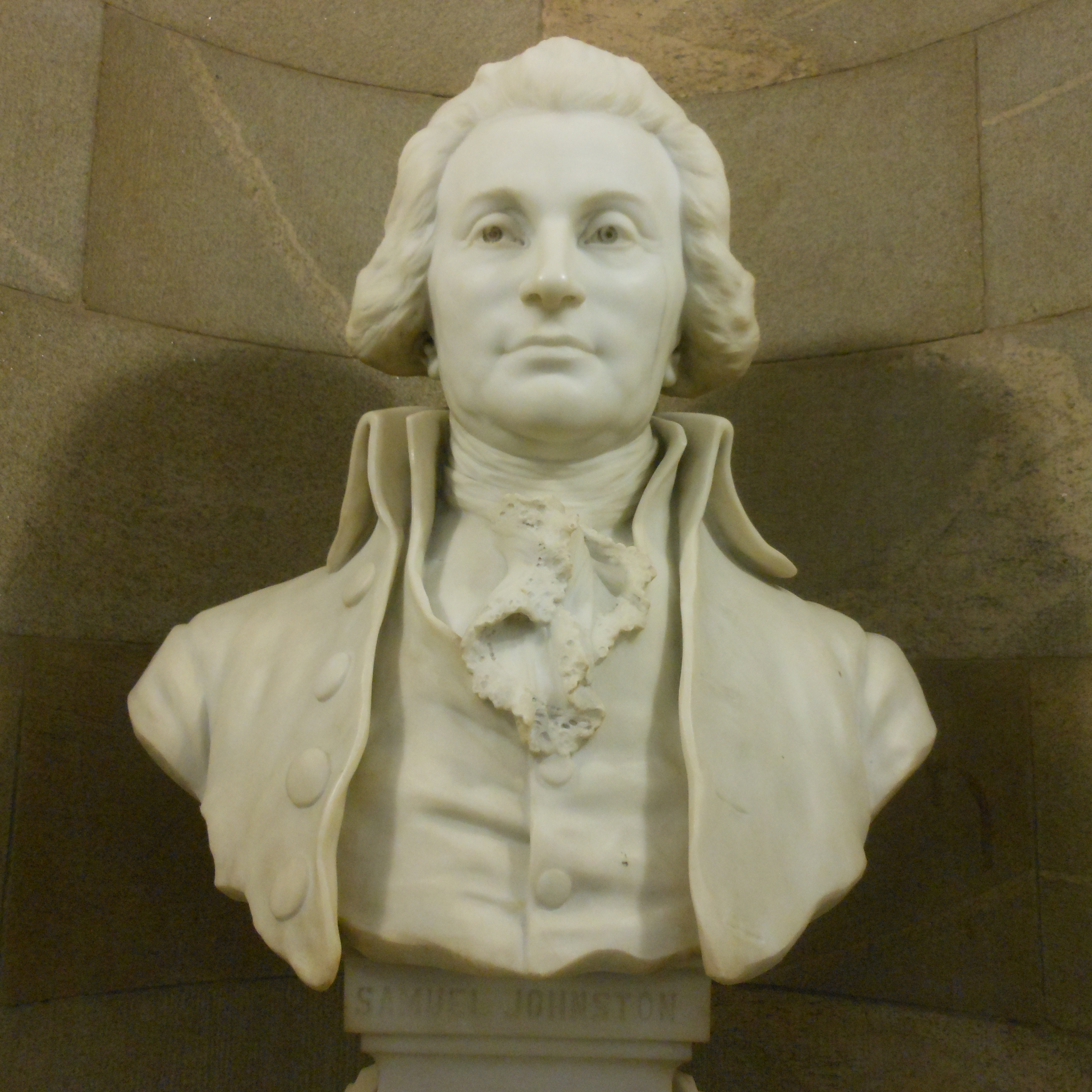
Samuel Johnston, Chowan County

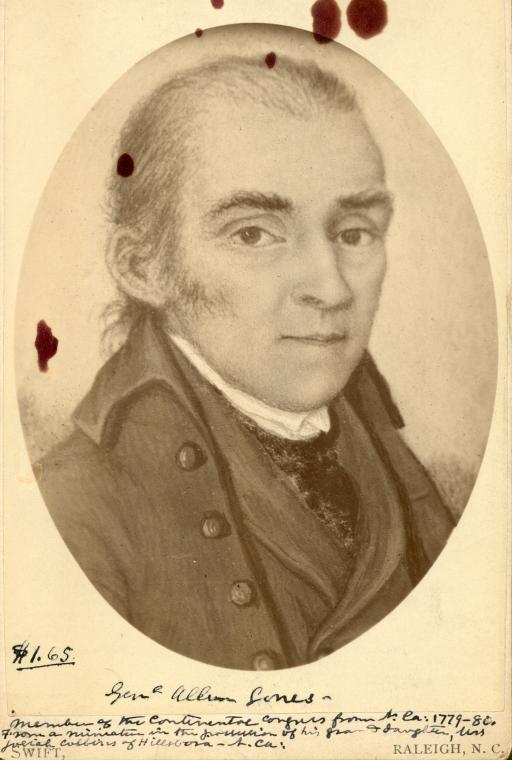
Allen Jones, Northampton County

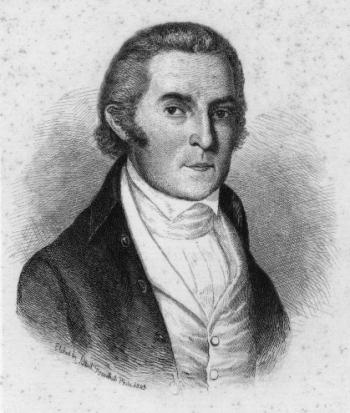
Willie Jones, Halifax County

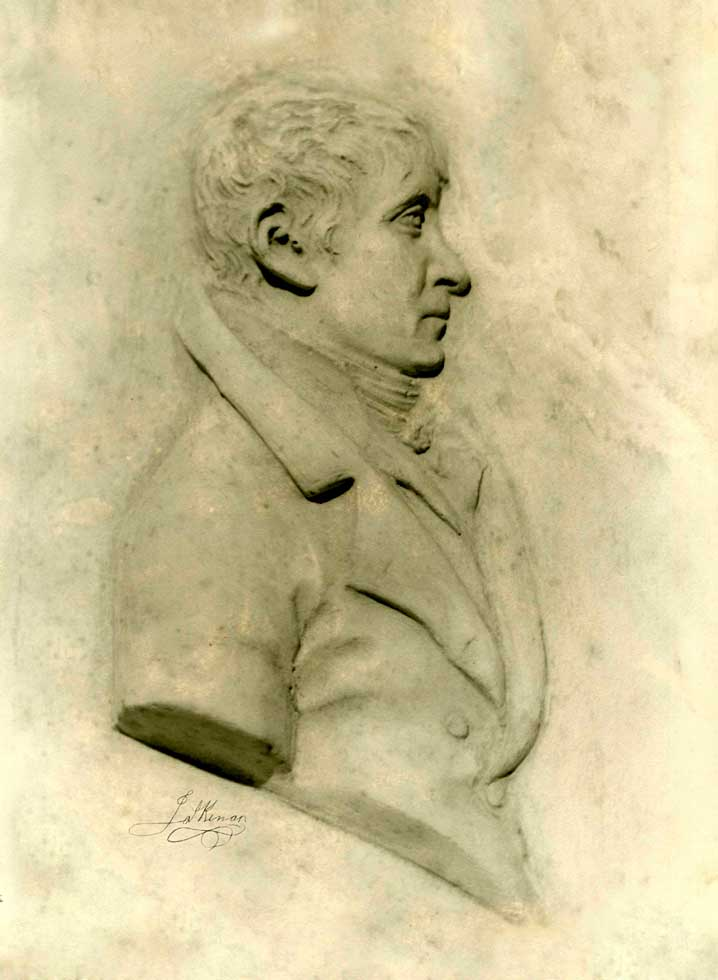
James Kenan, Duplin County

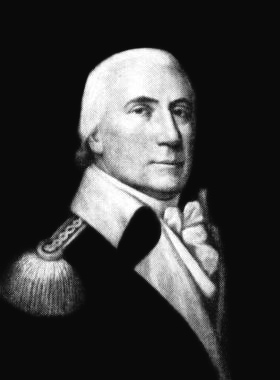
Alexander Martin, Guilford County

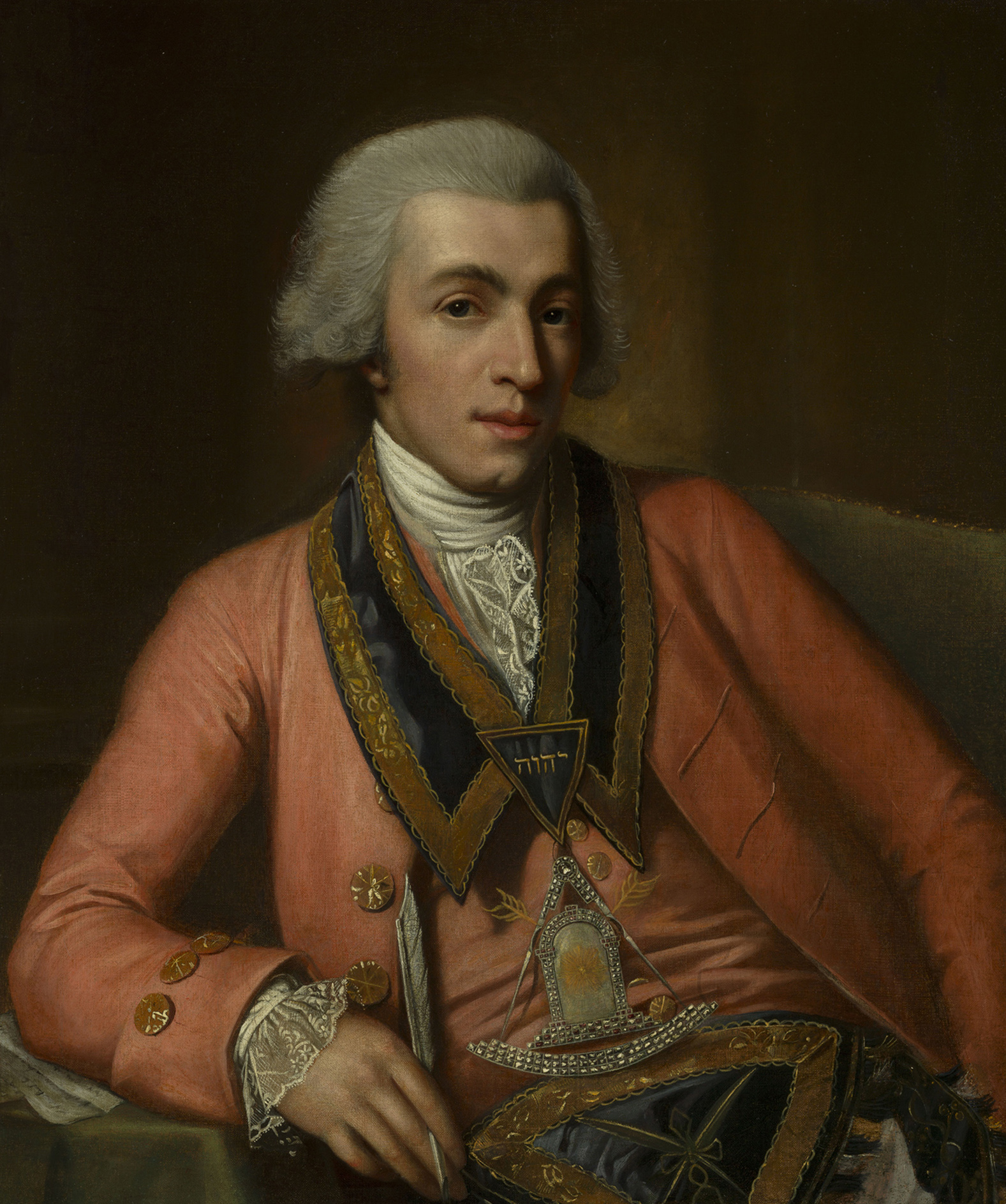
Joseph Montfort, Halifax

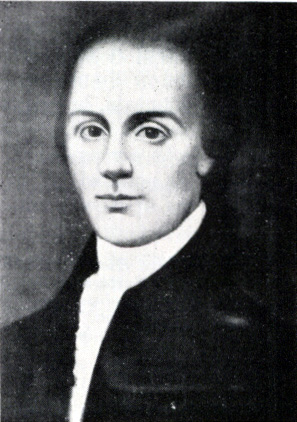
Abner Nash, Newbern

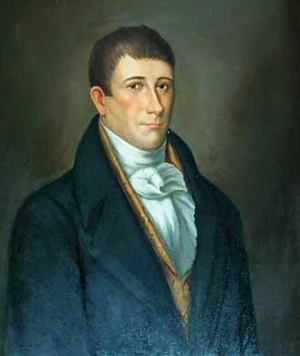
Benjamin Williams, Johnston County

The following is a full list of delegates to the second congress by constituency.

Constituency	Name	Member of General Assembly
Anson County	Samuel Spencer	
Anson County	William Thomas	
Beaufort County	Roger Ormond	Yes
Beaufort County	Thomas Respess Jr.	Yes
Beaufort County	William Salter	
Bertie County	John Campbell	Yes
Bertie County	John Johnston	Yes
Bertie County	David Stanley	Yes
Bladen County	William Saltar	Yes
Bladen County	James White	Yes
Brunswick County	Robert Howe	Yes
Brunswick County	John Rowan	Yes
Bute County	Thomas Eaton	
Bute County	Green Hill	Yes
Bute County	William Person	Yes
Bute County	James Ransom	
Carteret County	Solomon Shepard	Yes
Carteret County	William Thompson	Yes
Chatham County	Not represented	
Chowan County	Thomas Benbury	Yes
Chowan County	Thomas Hunter	Yes
Chowan County	Samuel Johnston	Yes
Chowan County	Thomas Jones	Yes
Chowan County	Thomas Oldham	Yes
Craven	William Bryan	
Craven County	Richard Cogdell	
Craven County	Jacob Blount	
Craven County	James Coor	Yes
Craven County	Joseph Leech	
Craven County	Lemuel Hatch	Yes
Cumberland County	Farquard Campbell	Yes
Cumberland County	Thomas Rutherford	Yes
Currituck County	Samuel Jarvis	Yes
Currituck County	Nathan Joyner (Note: Nathan Joyner was recorded as Poyner.)	Yes
Currituck County	Thomas McKnight	Yes
Currituck County	Solomon Perkins	Yes
Currituck County	Francis Williamson	Yes
Dobbs County	Richard Caswell	Yes
Dobbs County	William McKinnie	Yes
Dobbs County	George Miller	
Dobbs County	Simon Bright	
Duplin County	William Dickson	
Duplin County	Thomas Gray	
Duplin County	Thomas Hicks	
Duplin County	James Kenan	
Edgecombe County	Not represented	
Granville County	Memucan Hunt	
Granville County	Robert Montfort	
Granville County	Robert Williams	
Granville County	John Paine	
Granville County	Thomas Person	Yes
Guilford County	Alexander Martin	
Halifax County	Willie Jones	
Halifax County	Nicholas Long	Yes
Halifax County	Benjamin McCulloch	Yes
Hertford County	Joseph Worth	
Hertford County	George Wynns	Yes
Hyde County	Rotheas Latham	
Hyde County	Samuel Smith	
Johnston County	Needham Bryan	Yes
Johnston County	Benjamin Williams	Yes
Martin County	Edmund Smithwick	
Mecklenburg County	Benjamin Patten	
New Hanover County	John Baptista Ashe	Yes
New Hanover County	William Hooper	Yes
Northampton County	Jeptha Atherton	Yes
Northampton County	Allen Jones	Yes
Onslow County	William Cray	Yes
Onslow County	Henry Rhodes	Yes
Onslow County	Edward Starkey	
Orange County	Thomas Burke	
Orange County	Thomas Hart	Yes
Orange County	John Kinchen	
Pasquotank County	Edward Everagin	Yes
Pasquotank County	Jonathan Herring	Yes
Pasquotank County	Joseph Jones	Yes
Pasquotank County	Isaac Gregory	Yes
Pasquotank County	Joseph Reading	Yes
Perquimans County	John Harvey	Yes
Perquimans County	Thomas Harvey	Yes
Perquimans County	Andrew Knox	Yes
Perquimans County	John Whedbee	Yes
Perquimans County	Benjamin Harvey	
Pitt County	James Gorham	
Pitt County	James Lanier	
Pitt County	William Robeson	
Pitt County	Edward Salter	Yes
Pitt County	John Simpson	Yes
Rowan County	Griffith Rutherford	
Rowan County	William Sharpe	
Surry County	Not represented	
Tryon County	David Jenkins	
Tryon County	Robert Alexander	
Tyrrell County	Jeremiah Frazier	Yes
Tyrrell County	Benjamin Spruill	Yes
Tyrrell County	Joseph Spruill	Yes
Wake County	John Hinton	
Wake County	Tignal Jones	
Wake County	Michael Rogers	
Newbern Town	Abner Nash	
Newbern Town	James Davis	
Edenton	Joseph Hewes	Yes
Wilmington	Cornelius Harnett	Yes
Bath	William Brown	Yes
Halifax Town	John Webb	
Halifax Town	Joseph Montfort	
Hillsborough	Francis Nash	Yes
Salisbury	William Kennon	
Brunswick Town	Parker Quince	Yes
Campbelton (Note: Campbelton became part of Fayetteville, North Carolina, in 1783.)	Robert Rowan	Yes
