= First North Carolina Provincial Congress =

1774 meeting in Craven, North Carolina

2nd	→

Overview
- Legislative body: North Carolina Provincial Congress
- Jurisdiction: North Carolina (de facto)
- Meeting place: Craven Court House
- Term: August 25, 1774 – August 27, 1774

Provincial Congress
- Members: 71 deputies
- Moderator: Col. John Harvey

Sovereign
- Monarch: HM George III
- Governor: HE Josiah Martin

The First North Carolina Provincial Congress was a meeting of the provincial congress of the de facto provincial government of North Carolina, composed of 71 deputies from 35 counties (six not being represented) and nine towns (three not being represented). The congress convened in Newbern, on August 25, 1774, and ended on August 27, 1774, during the final two years of Josiah Martin's gubernatorial administration. Colonel John Harvey was unanimously chosen as moderator.

== History ==
=== Resolutions ===
The deputies to the First Provincial Congress deliberated in 1774 in response to the Boston Tea Party and Intolerable Acts (Boston Port Act) by British rulers. The following resolutions were passed by this congress on August 27, 1774 and are listed below as they appear in the minutes of the sessions.

"We his Majesty's most dutiful and Loyal Subjects, the deputies from the several Counties and Towns, of the Province of North Carolina, impressed with the most sacred respect for the British Constitution, and resolved to maintain the succession of the House of Hanover, as by law Established, and avowing our inviolable and unshaken Fidelity to our sovereign, and entertaining a sincere regard for our fellow subjects in Great Britain viewing with the utmost abhorrence every attempt which may tend to disturb the peace and good order of this Colony, or to shake the fidelity of his Majesty's subjects resident here, but at the same time conceiving it a duty which we owe to ourselves and to posterity, in the present alarming state of British America, when our most essential rights are invaded by powers unwarrantably assumed by the Parliament of Great Britain to declare our sentiments in the most public manner, lest silence should be construed as acquiescence, and that we patiently submit to the Burdens which they have thought fit to impose upon us."

- "Resolved, That His Majesty George the third is lawful and rightful King of Great Britain, and the dominions thereunto belonging, and of this province as part thereof, and that we do bear faithful and true allegiance unto him as our lawful sovereign, that we will to the utmost of our power, maintain and defend the succession of the House of Hanover as by law established against the open or private attempts of any person or persons whatsoever."
- "Resolved, That we claim no more than the rights of Englishmen, without diminution or abridgement, that it is our indispensable duty and will be our constant endeavour, to maintain those rights to the utmost of our power consistently with the loyalty which we owe our sovereign, and sacred regard for the British Constitution."
- "Resolved, That it is the very essence of the British Constitution that no subject should be taxed but by his own consent, freely given by himself in person or by his legal representatives, and that any other than such a taxation is highly derogatory to the rights of a subject and a gross violation of the grand charter of our liberties."
- "Resolved, That as the British subjects resident in North America, have nor can have any representation in the Parliament of Great Britain, Therefore any act of Parliament imposing a tax is illegal and unconstitutional, That our Provincial Assemblies, the King by his governors constituting one branch thereof, solely and exclusively possess that right."
- "Resolved, That the duties imposed by several acts of the British Parliament, upon Tea and other articles consumed in America for the purpose of raising a revenue, are highly illegal and oppressive, and that the late Exportation of tea by the East India Company to different parts of America was intended to give effect to one of the said Acts and thereby establish a precedent highly dishonorable to America and to obtain an implied assent to the powers which Great Britain had unwarrantably assumed of levying a tax upon us without our consent."
- "Resolved, That the inhabitants of the Massachusetts province have distinguished themselves in a manly support of the rights of America in general and that the cause in which they suffer is the Cause of every honest American who deserves the Blessings which the Constitution holds forth to them. That the Grievances under which the town of Boston labours at present are the effect of a resentment levelled at them for having stood foremost in an opposition to measures which must eventually involve all British America in a state of abject dependence and servitude."

"The act of Parliament commonly called the Boston Port Act, as it tends to shut up the Port of Boston and thereby effectually destroy its Trade and deprive the Merchants and Manufacturers of a subsistance which they have hitherto procured by an honest industry, as it takes away the Wharves, Quays and other property of many individuals, by rendering it useless to them, and as the duration of this Act depends upon Circumstances founded merely in opinion, and in their nature indeterminate, and thereby may make the miseries it carries with it even perpetual,"

- "Resolved therefore that it is the most cruel infringement of the rights and privileges of the people of Boston, both as men, and members of the British Government."
- "Resolved, That the late Act of Parliament for regulating the Police of that province is an infringement of the Charter right granted them by their Majesties, King William and Queen Mary, and tends to lessen that sacred confidence which ought to be placed in the Acts of Kings."
- "Resolved, That trial by Juries of the vicinity is the only lawful inquest that can pass upon the life of a British subject and that it is a right handed down to us from the earliest stages confirmed and sanctified by Magna Charta itself that no freeman shall be taken and imprisoned or dispossessed of his free tenement and Liberties or outlawed or banished or otherwise hurt or injured unless by the legal judgment of his peers or by the law of the Land, and therefore all who suffer otherwise are not victims to public justice but fall a sacrifice to the powers of Tyranny and highhanded oppression."
- "Resolved, That the Bill for altering the administration of justice in certain criminal cases, within the province of Massachusetts Bay as it empowers the Governors thereof to send to Great Britain for trial all persons who in aid of his Majestys officers shall commit any capital offence is fraught with the highest injustice and partiality and will tend to produce frequent bloodshed of its inhabitants, as this act furnishes an opportunity to commit the most atrocious Crimes with the Greatest probability of impunity."
- "Resolved, That we will not directly or indirectly after the first day of January 1775 import from Great Britain any East India Goods, or any merchandize whatever, medicines excepted, nor will we after that day import from the West Indies or elsewhere any East India or British Goods or Manufactures, nor will we purchase any such articles so imported of any person or persons whatsoever, except such as are now in the Country or may arrive on or before the first day of January 1775."
- "Resolved, That unless American Grievances are redressed before the first day of October 1775, We will not after that day directly or indirectly export Tobacco, Pitch, Tar, Turpentine, or any other article whatsoever, to Great Britain, nor will we sell any such articles as we think can be exported to Great Britain, with a prospect of Gain to any Person or Persons whatever with a design of putting it in his or their power to export the same to Great Britain either on our own, his, or their account."
- "Resolved, That we will not import any slave or slaves, nor purchase any slave or slaves imported or brought into this province by others from any part of the world after the first day of November next.
- "Resolved, That we will not use nor suffer East India Tea to be used in our Families after the tenth day of September next, and that we will consider all persons in this province not complying with this resolve to be enemies to their Country."
- "Resolved, That the Venders of Merchandize within this province ought not to take advantage of the Resolves relating to non importation in this province or elsewhere but ought to sell their Goods or Merchandize which they have or may hereafter import, at the same rates they have been accustomed to sell them within three months last past."
- "Resolved, That the people of this province will break off all trade, Commerce, and dealings, and will not maintain any, the least trade, dealing or Commercial intercourse, with any Colony on this Continent, or with any city or town, or with any individual in such Colony, City or town, which shall refuse, decline, or neglect to adopt and carry into execution such General plan, as shall be agreed to in the Continental Congress."
- "Resolved, That we approve of the proposal of a General Congress to be held in the City of Philadelphia, on the 20th of September next, then and there to deliberate upon the present state of British America and to take such measures as they may deem prudent to effect the purpose of describing with certainty the Rights of Americans, repairing the breaches made in those rights and for guarding them for the future from any such violations done under the sanction of public authority."
- "Resolved, That William Hooper, Joseph Hewes and Richard Caswell Esquires, and every of them be Deputies to attend such Congress, and they are hereby invested with such powers as may make any Act done by them or consent given in behalf of this province Obligatory in honor upon every inhabitant thereof who is not an alien to his Country's good and an apostate to the liberties of America."
- "Resolved, That they view the attempt made by the ministers upon the Town of Boston, as a prelude to a general attack upon the rights of the other Colonies, and that upon the success of this depends in a great measure the Happiness of America, in its present race and in posterity and that therefore it becomes our duty to Contribute in proportion to our abilities to ease the burthen imposed upon that town for their Virtuous Opposition to the Revenue Acts that they may be enabled to persist in a prudent and Manly opposition to the schemes of Parliament and render its dangerous design abortive."
- "Resolved, That Liberty is the Spirit of the British Constitution, and that it is the duty, and will be the Endeavour of us as British Americans to transmit this happy Constitution to our posterity in a state if possible better than we found it, and to suffer it to undergo a change which may impair that invaluable Blessing would be to disgrace those ancestors who at the Expence of their blood purchased those privileges which their degenerate posterity are too weak or too wicked to maintain inviolate."
- "Resolved, That every future provincial meeting when any division shall happen the method to be observed shall be to vote by the Counties and Towns (having a right to send members to Assembly) that shall be represented at every such meeting; and it is recommended to the deputies of the several Counties, That a Committee of five persons be chosen in each County by such persons as acceed to this association to take effectual care that these Resolves be properly observed and to correspond occasionally with the Provincial Committee of Correspondence of this province."
- "Resolved, That each and every County in this Province raise as speedily as possible the sum of twenty pounds Proclamation money and pay the same into the hands of Richard Caswell Esquire to be by him equally divided among the Deputies appointed to attend the General Congress at Philadelphia as a recompense for their trouble and expense in attending the said Congress."
- "Resolved, That the moderator of this meeting and in case of his death Samuel Johnston Esquire be impowered on any future occasion that may in his opinion require it to convene the several deputies of this province which now are or hereafter shall be chosen, at such time and place as he shall think proper, or in case of the death or absence of any deputy it is recommended that another be chosen in his stead."
- "Resolved, That the following instructions for the deputies appointed to meet in General Congress on the part of this Colony to wit: That they express their most sincere attachment to our most gracious sovereign King George the third, and our determined resolution to support his Lawful authority in this Province, at the same time we cannot depart from a steady adherence to the first law of Nature, a firm and resolute defence of our persons and properties against all unconstitutional encroachments whatever."

"That they assert our rights to all the privileges of British subjects particularly that of paying no taxes or duties but with our own consent, and that the Legislature of this province, have the exclusive power of making laws to regulate our internal Polity subject to his Majesty's disallowance."

"That should the British Parliament continue to exercise the power of levying taxes and duties on the Colonies, and making laws to bind them in all cases whatsoever; such laws must be highly unconstitutional, and oppressive to the inhabitants of British America, who have not, and from their local circumstances cannot have a fair and equal representation in the British Parliament, and that these disadvantages must be greatly enhanced by the misrepresentation of designing Men inimical to the Colonies, the influence of whose reports cannot be guarded against, by reason of the distance of America from them or as has been unhapily experienced in the case of the Town of Boston, when the ears of the administration have been shut, against every attempt to vindicate a people, who claimed only the right of being heard in their own defence."

"That therefore until we obtain an explicit declaration and acknowledgment of our rights, we agree to stop all imports, from Great Britain after the first day of January 1775, and that we will not export any of our Commodities to Great Britain after the first day of October 1775."

"That they concur with the Deputies or Delegates from the other Colonies, in such regulation, address or remonstrance, as may be deemed most probable to restore a lasting harmony, and good understanding with Great Britain, a circumstance we most sincerely and ardently desire and that they agree with a majority of them in all necessary measures, for promoting a redress of such grievances as may come under their consideration."

- "Resolved, That the thanks of this meeting be given to the Hon. John Harvey Esquire Moderator for his faithful exercise of that office and the services he has thereby rendered to this Province and the Friends of America in General."

Signed: JOHN HARVEY, Moderator, Richard Cogdell, Wm Thomson, Solomon Perkins, Nathan Joyner, Sam. Jarvis, Sam. Johnston, Thos. Benbury, Thos. Jones, Thos. Oldham, Thos. Hunter, Ferqd Campbell, M. Hunt, Nick Long, Benj. Williams, William Hooper, Wm Cray, Thos. Harvey, Edward Everigin, Edward Salter, Sam. Young, Joseph Spruil, Joseph Hewes, John Geddy, Sam Spencer, Wm Thomas, Roger Ormond, Thos. Respess, Jr, Wm Saltar, Walter Gibson, Wm Person, Green Hill, R. Howe, John Campbell, James Coor, Sam. Smith, Willie Jones, Benj. Patten, Allen Jones, Benj. Harvey, J. Whedbee, Joseph Reading, Wm Kennon, David Jenkins, Abner Nash, Francis Clayton, Edward Smythwick, Lemuel Hatch, Thomas Rutherford, R. Caswell, Wm McKinnie, Geo. Miller, Simon Bright, Thos Gray, Thos Hicks, James Kenan, William Dickson, Thos. Person, Rothias Latham, Needham Bryan, John Ashe, Thomas Hart, Andrew Knox, Joseph Jones, John Simpson, Moses Winslow, Robert Alexander, I. Edwards, William Brown, Jeremiah Frasier

=== Deputies ===
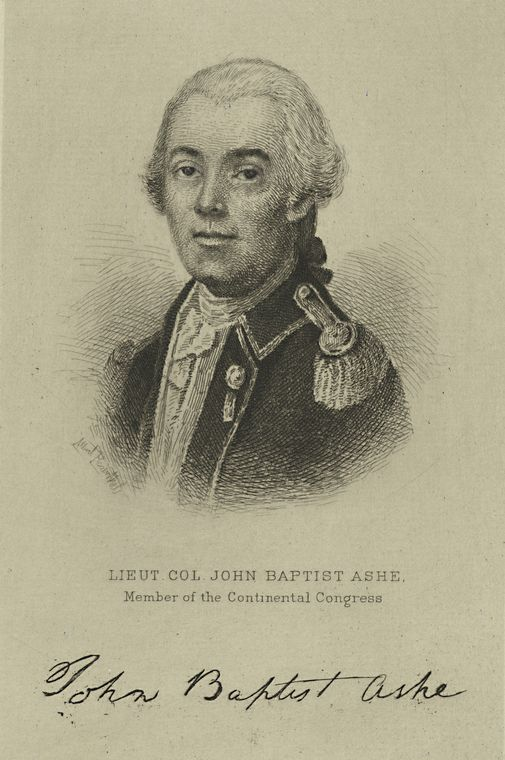
John Baptista Ashe, New Hanover County

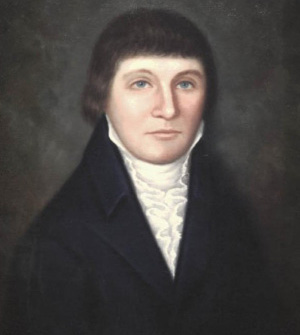
Richard Caswell, Dobbs County

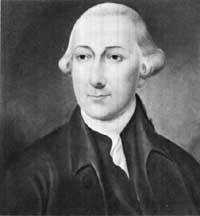
Joseph Hewes, Edenton

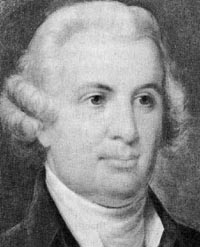
William Hooper, New Hanover County

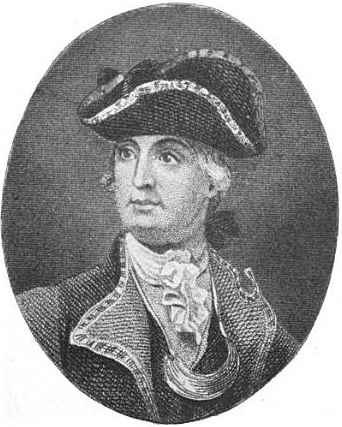
Robert Howe, Brunswick County

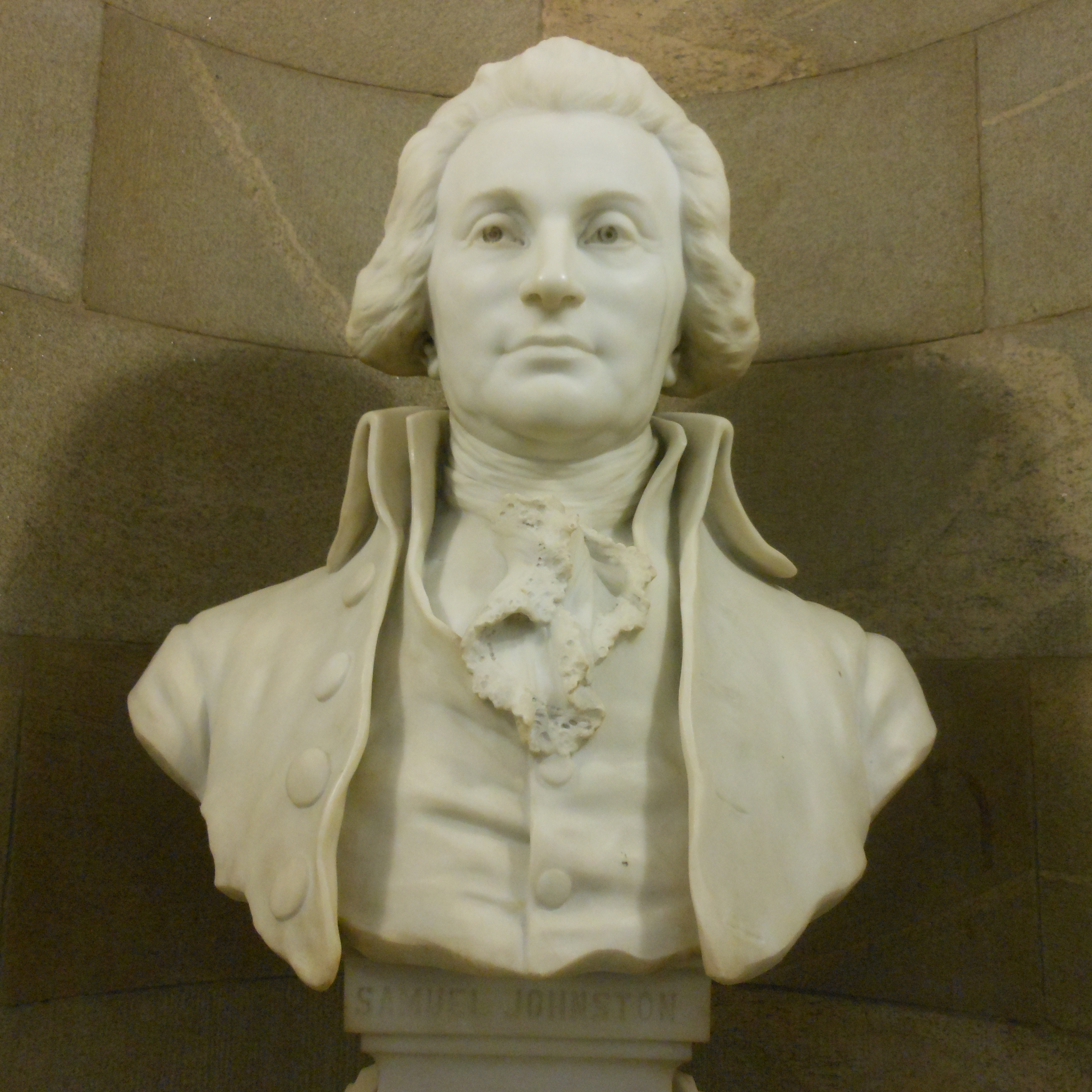
Samuel Johnston, Chowan County

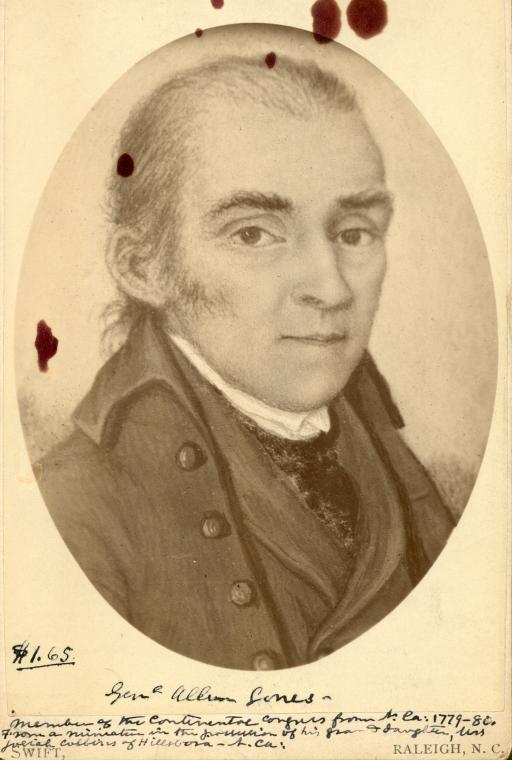
Allen Jones, Northampton County

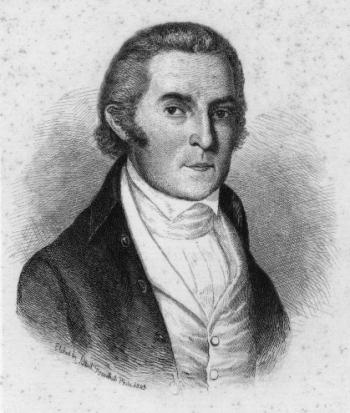
Willie Jones, Halifax County

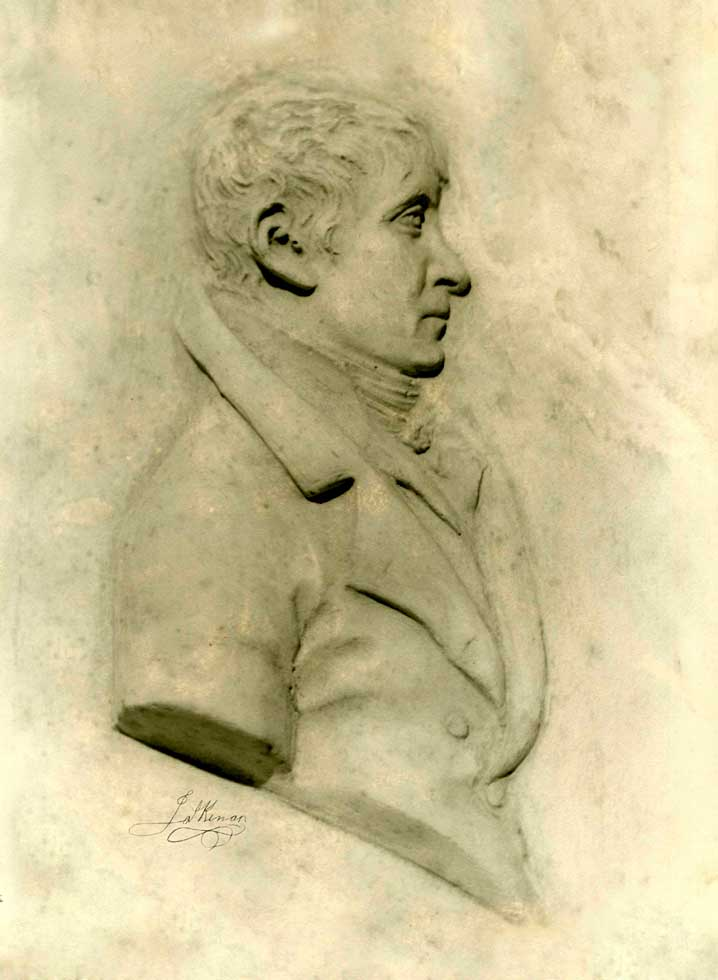
James Kenan, Duplin County

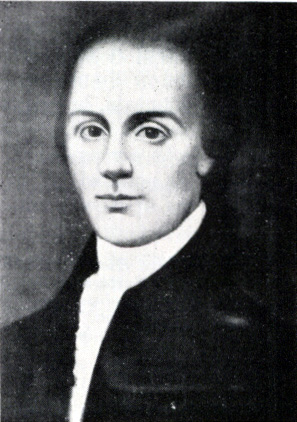
Abner Nash, Newbern

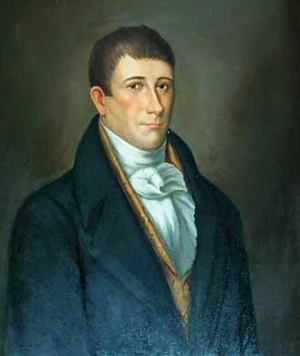
Benjamin Williams, Johnston County

The following is a full list of deputies to the first congress by constituency. Members of provincial congress serving in the Continental Congress are also indicated.

Constituency	Name
Anson County	Samuel Spencer
Anson County	William Thomas
Beaufort County	Roger Ormond
Beaufort County	Thomas Respess Jr.
Bertie County	John Campbell
Bladen County	William Saltar
Bladen County	Walter Gibson
Brunswick County	Robert Howe
Bute County	Green Hill
Bute County	William Person
Carteret County	William Thompson
Carteret County	Solomon Shepard
Chatham County	not represented
Chowan County	Thomas Benbury
Chowan County	Thomas Hunter
Chowan County	Samuel Johnston (Note: Representative to the Second Continental Congress) (Note: Representative to the Congress of the Confederation)
Chowan County	Thomas Jones
Chowan County	Thomas Oldham
Craven County	Richard Cogdell
Craven County	James Coor
Craven County	Lemuel Hatch
Craven County	Joseph Leech
Cumberland County	Farquard Campbell
Cumberland County	Thomas Rutherford
Currituck County	Samuel Jarvis
Currituck County	Solomon Perkins
Currituck County	Nathan Joyner (Note: Nathan Joyner was sometimes recorded as Nathan Poyner)
Dobbs County	Richard Caswell (Note: Representative to the First Continental Congress)
Dobbs County	William McKinnie
Dobbs County	George Miller
Dobbs County	Simon Bright
Duplin County	William Dickson
Duplin County	Thomas Gray
Duplin County	Thomas Hicks
Duplin County	James Kenan
Edgecombe County	not represented
Granville County	Memucan Hunt
Granville County	Thomas Person
Guilford County	not represented
Halifax County	Willie Jones
Halifax County	Nicholas Long
Hertford County	not represented
Hyde County	Rotheas Latham
Hyde County	Samuel Smith
Johnston County	Needham Bryan
Johnston County	Benjamin Williams
Martin County	Edmund Smithwick
Mecklenburg County	Benjamin Patten
New Hanover County	John Baptista Ashe
New Hanover County	William Hooper
Northampton County	Allen Jones
Onslow County	William Cray
Orange County	Thomas Hart
Pasquotank County	Joseph Jones
Pasquotank County	Edward Everagin
Pasquotank County	Joseph Reading
Perquimans County	Benjamin Harvey
Perquimans County	John Harvey
Perquimans County	Thomas Harvey
Perquimans County	Andrew Knox
Perquimans County	John Whedbee Jr.
Pitt County	Edward Salter
Pitt County	John Simpson
Rowan County	Moses Winslow
Rowan County	Samuel Young
Surry County	not represented
Tryon County	David Jenkins
Tryon County	Robert Alexander
Tyrrell County	Joseph Spruill
Tyrrell County	Jeremiah Frazier
Wake County	not represented
Newbern	Abner Nash
Newbern	Isaac Edwards
Edenton	Joseph Hewes
Wilmington	Francis Clayton
Bath	William Brown
Halifax	John Geddy
Hillsborough	not represented
Salisbury	William Kennon
Brunswick	not represented
Campbelton (Note: Campbelton became part of Fayetteville, North Carolina, in 1783.)	not represented
