= Third North Carolina Provincial Congress =

1775 meeting in Hillsborough, North Carolina

←	2nd	4th	→

Overview
- Legislative body: North Carolina Provincial Congress
- Jurisdiction: North Carolina (de facto)
- Meeting place: St. Matthew's Church, Hillsborough
- Term: August 20, 1775 – September 10, 1775

Provincial Congress
- Members: 213 delegates
- President: Samuel Johnston

Sovereign
- Monarch: HM George III
- Governor: HE Josiah Martin

The Third North Carolina Provincial Congress was a meeting of the provincial congress of the de facto provincial government of North Carolina, composed of 213 delegates from 35 counties and nine towns. The congress convened in Hillsborough on August 20, 1775, and ended on September 10, 1775, during the final year of Josiah Martin's gubernatorial administration. Samuel Johnston was unanimously chosen as president as the former president, Colonel John Harvey, had died.

== History ==
=== Resolutions ===
The Third Provincial Congress, which included representatives of all 35 counties and nine towns, established itself as the highest governmental body within the Province of North Carolina after May 24, 1775, when British governor Josiah Martin fled the Governor's Palace at Newbern, ending sixty-three continuous years of colonial rule. The last North Carolina provincial assembly met at Newbern from April 4 to April 8, 1775, before Governor Martin prorogued the House of Burgesses.

The Third Provincial Congress divided the province into six militia districts for purposes of organizing the militia and for determining representation on a provincial council. The militia districts included Edenton, Halifax, Hillsborough, New Bern, Salisbury, and Wilmington. Later, an additional district, Morgan, was added for the western part of the province, including counties that eventually became part of Tennessee (Davidson, Greene, and Washington). Much of the deliberations of the congress dealt with the safety of its residents and preparation for war with Great Britain.

To govern the province when congress was not in session, a 13-man provincial council was elected, constituting the first executive body free of British rule. Cornelius Harnett was elected the first council president.

The following 13 members were appointed to the North Carolina Provincial Council by the Provincial Congress:

- The Honorable Samuel Johnston, Esquire; Cornelius Harnett and Samuel Ashe, Esquires, Wilmington District
- Thomas Jones and Whitmell Hill, Esquires, Edenton District
- Abner Nash and James Coor, Esquires, New Bern District
- Thomas Person and John Kinchen, Esquires, Hillsborough District
- Willie Jones and Thomas Eaton, Esquires, Halifax District
- Samuel Spencer and Waightstill Avery, Esquires, Salisbury District

The delegates formed a committee of safety at the provincial level. The delegates also elected members of the military district Committees of Safety "for their common defence against their Enemies, for the Security of their Liberties and properties". These committees at the district level would become the roots of the militias. The following persons were elected to the Committees of Safety for military districts:

- Wilmington District: Frederick Jones, Sampson Mosely, Archibald Maclaine, Richard Quince, Thomas Davis, William Cray, Henry Rhodes, Thomas Routledge, James Kenan, Alexander McAlister, George Mylne, John Smith and Benjamin Stone.
- Edenton District: Luke Sumner, William Gray, John Johnston, Thomas Benbury, Gideon Lamb, Joseph Jones, Miles Harvey, Lawrence Baker, Kenneth McKinzie, Stevens Lee, Charles Blount, Isaac Gregory and Day Ridley.
- Hillsborough District: William Taylor, Joseph Taylor, Samuel Smith, John Atkinson, John Butler, William Johnston, John Hinton, Joel Lane, Michael Rogers, Ambrose Ramsey, Mial Scurlock, John Thompson and John Lark.
- New Bern District: John Easton, Major Croom, Roger Ormond, Edward Salter, George Barrow, William Thomson, William Tisdale, Benjamin Williams, Richard Ellis, Richard Cogdell, William Brown, James Glasgow and Alexander Gaston.
- Salisbury District: John Crawford, James Auld, Hezekiah Alexander, Benjamin Patten, John Brevard, Griffith Rutherford, William Hill, John Hamlin, Charles Galloway, William Dent, Robert Ewart and Maxwell Chambers.
- Halifax District: James Leslie, John Bradford, David Sumner, Allen Jones, William Eaton, Drury Gee, John Norwood, the Revd Henry Pattillo, James Mills, William Bellamy, William Haywood, Duncan Lamon and John Webb.

=== Delegates ===
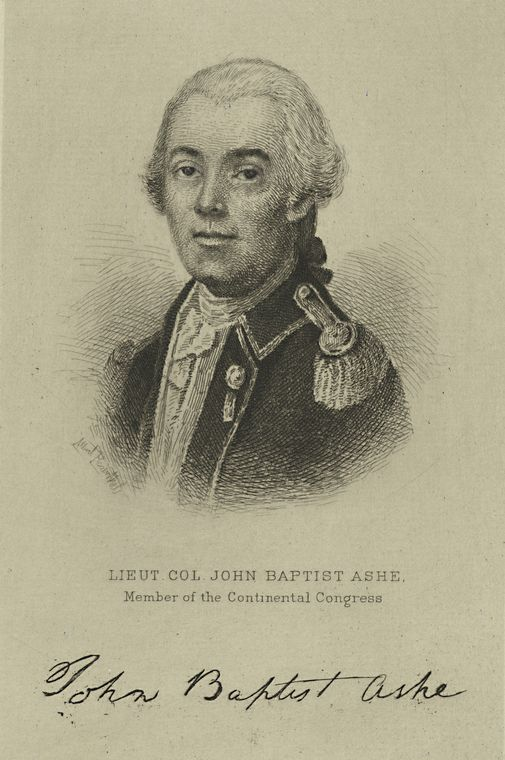
John Baptista Ashe, New Hanover County

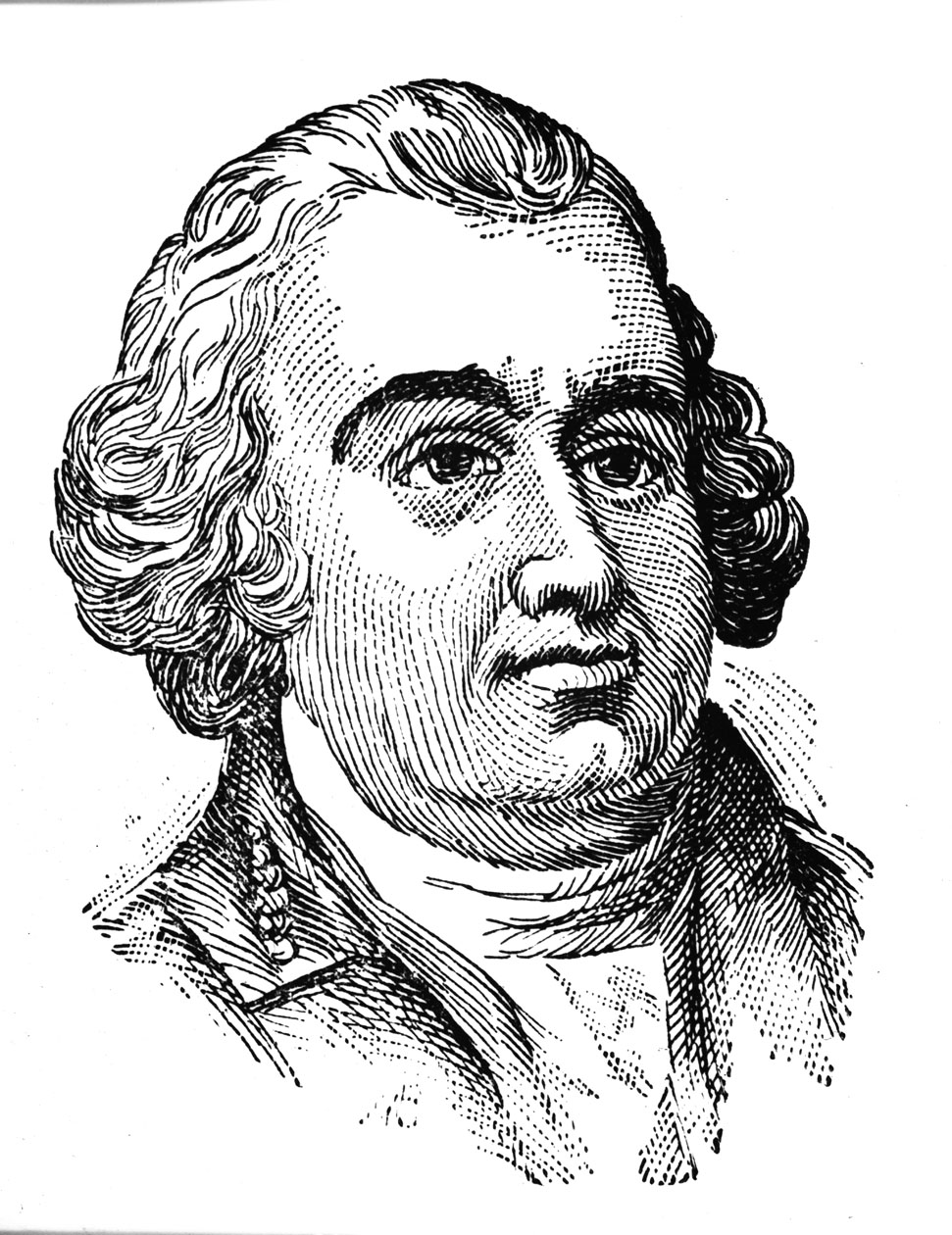
Thomas Burke, Orange County

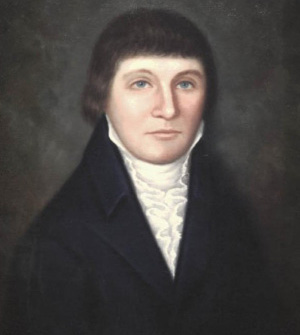
Richard Caswell, Dobbs County

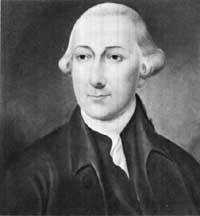
Joseph Hewes, Edenton

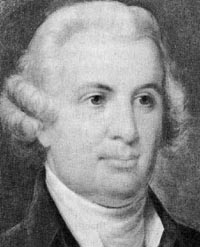
William Hooper, New Hanover County

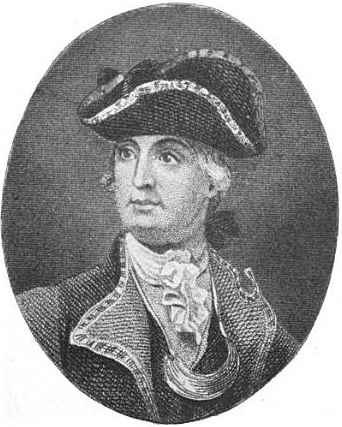
Robert Howe, Brunswick County

Samuel Johnston, Chowan County

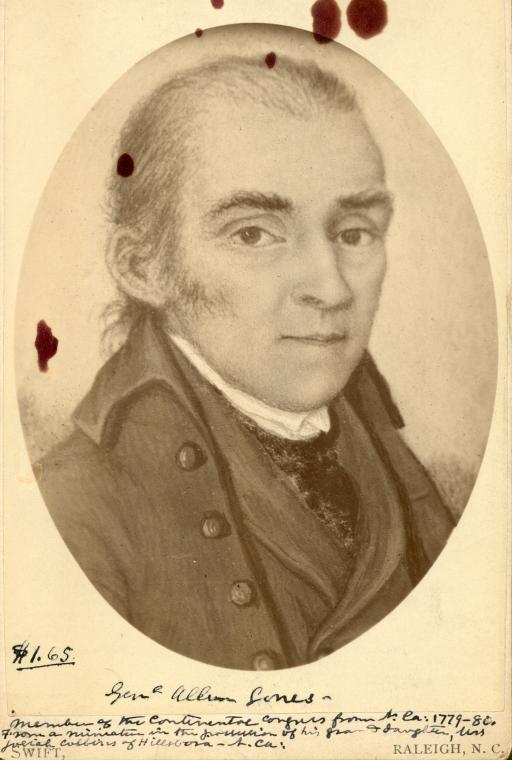
Allen Jones, Northampton County

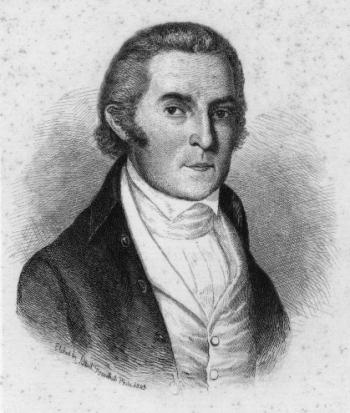
Willie Jones, Halifax County

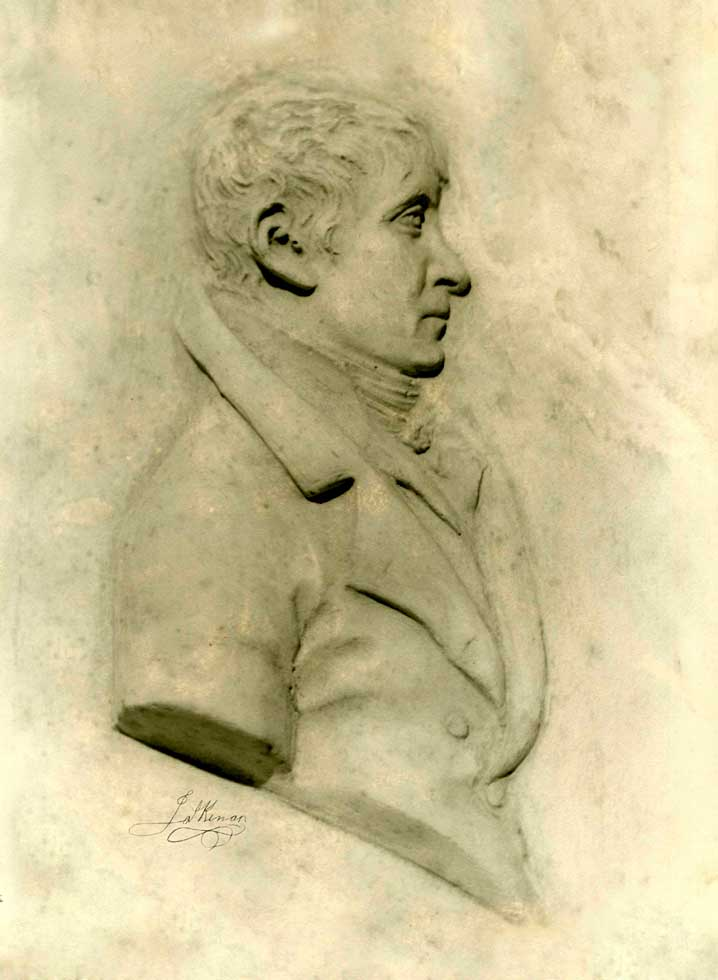
James Kenan, Duplin County

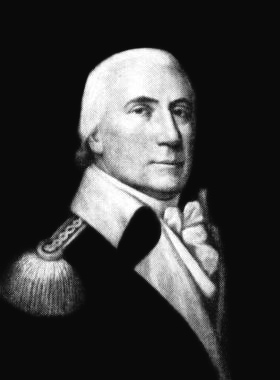
Alexander Martin, Guilford County

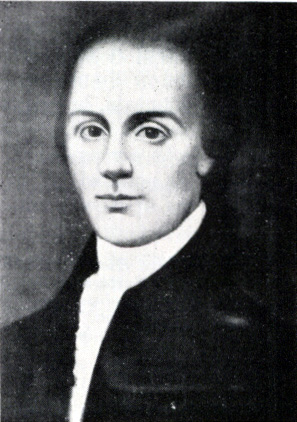
Abner Nash, New Bern

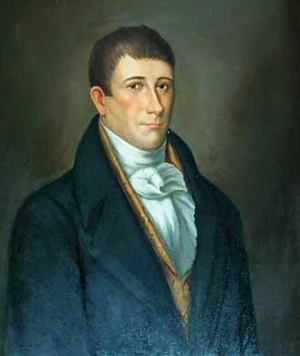
Benjamin Williams, Johnston County

The following is a full list of delegates to the third congress by constituency.

Constituency	Name
Anson County	David Love
Anson County	William Pickett
Anson County	Samuel Spencer
Anson County	William Thomas
Anson County	Thomas Wade
Beaufort County	John Cowper
Beaufort County	Roger Ormond
Beaufort County	John Patton
Beaufort County	Thomas Respess Jr.
Bertie County	Thomas Ballard
Bertie County	William Brimmage
Bertie County	William Bryan
Bertie County	John Campbell
Bertie County	Peter Clifton
Bertie County	William Gray
Bertie County	Charles Jaycocks
Bertie County	Jonathan Jaycocks
Bertie County	John Johnston
Bertie County	David Standly
Bertie County	Zedekiah Stone
Bladen County	Walter Gibson
Bladen County	Thomas Owen
Bladen County	Nathaniel Richardson
Bladen County	Thomas Robeson Jr.
Bladen County	William Saltar
Brunswick County	Thomas Alton
Brunswick County	Robert Ellis
Brunswick County	Robert Howe
Brunswick County	Roger Moore
Brunswick County	Parker Quince
Bute County	Thomas Eaton
Bute County	Green Hill
Bute County	Rev. Henry Pattillo
Bute County	William Person
Bute County	Josiah Reddick
Bute County	Jethro Sumner
Carteret County	John Eason
Carteret County	Solomon Sheppard
Carteret County	William Thompson
Carteret County	Enoch Ward
Carteret County	Bryce Williams
Chatham County	John Birdsong
Chatham County	Elisha Cain
Chatham County	William Clark
Chatham County	Jeduthan Harper
Chatham County	Richard Kennon
Chatham County	Matthew Jones
Chatham County	Ambrose Ramsey
Chatham County	Joseph Rosser
Chatham County	Robert Rutherford
Chatham County	John Thompson
Chowan County	Thomas Benbury
Chowan County	James Blount
Chowan County	Josiah Grandbury
Chowan County	Thomas Hunter
Chowan County	Samuel Johnston
Chowan County	Thomas Jones
Craven County	Jacob Blount
Craven County	William Bryan
Craven County	Richard Cogdell
Craven County	James Coor
Craven County	Edmund Hatch
Craven County	Joseph Leech
Cumberland County	Farquard Campbell
Cumberland County	Alexander McAllister
Cumberland County	Alexander McKay
Cumberland County	Thomas Rutherford
Cumberland County	David Smith
Currituck County	Thomas Jarvis
Currituck County	Gideon Lamb
Currituck County	Solomon Perkins
Currituck County	James Ryan
Currituck County	James White
Dobbs County	Andrew Bass
Dobbs County	Simon Bright
Dobbs County	Richard Caswell
Dobbs County	James Glasgow
Dobbs County	George Miller
Dobbs County	Abraham Sheppard
Dobbs County	Spyars Singleton
Duplin County	Richard Clinton
Duplin County	William Dickson
Duplin County	Thomas Gray
Duplin County	Thomas Hicks
Duplin County	James Kenan
Edgecombe County	Robert Bignal
Edgecombe County	Thomas H. Hall
Edgecombe County	Thomas Hunter
Edgecombe County	Henry Irwin
Edgecombe County	Duncan Lamon
Granville County	Memucan Hunt
Granville County	John Penn
Granville County	Thomas Person
Granville County	John Taylor
Granville County	John Williams
Guilford County	George Cortner
Guilford County	William Dent
Guilford County	James Park Farley
Guilford County	Thomas Henderson
Guilford County	Alexander Martin
Guilford County	Ransom Sutherland
Guilford County	Nathaniel Williams
Halifax County	John Geddy
Halifax County	James Hogun
Halifax County	Nicholas Long
Halifax County	David Sumner
Halifax County	John Webb
Hertford County	Lawrence Baker
Hertford County	Matthew Brickel
Hertford County	William Murfree
Hertford County	Day Ridly
Hertford County	George Wynns
Hyde County	Joseph Hancock
Hyde County	John Jordan
Johnston County	Needham Bryan
Johnston County	William Bryan
Johnston County	John Smith
Johnston County	Samuel Smith
Johnston County	Benjamin Williams
Martin County	John Everitt
Martin County	Whitmell Hill
Martin County	Kenneth McKenzie
Martin County	William Slade
Martin County	John Stuart
Martin County	William Williams
Mecklenburg County	John McKnitt Alexander
Mecklenburg County	Waightstill Avery
Mecklenburg County	James Houston
Mecklenburg County	Samuel Martin
Mecklenburg County	John Phifer
Mecklenburg County	Thomas Polk
New Hanover County	John Baptista Ashe
New Hanover County	Samuel Ashe
New Hanover County	William Hooper
New Hanover County	John Alexander Lillington
New Hanover County	George Moore
New Hanover County	James Moore
Northampton County	Jeptha Atherton
Northampton County	Howell Edmunds
Northampton County	Drewry Gee
Northampton County	Allen Jones
Northampton County	Samuel Lockhart
Onslow County	Isaac Guion
Onslow County	John King
Onslow County	Henry Rhodes
Onslow County	John Spicer
Onslow County	Edward Starkey
Orange County	John Atkinson
Orange County	Thomas Burke
Orange County	Thomas Hart
Orange County	John Kinchen
Orange County	John Williams
Pasquotank County	Thomas Boyd
Pasquotank County	Dempsey Burgess
Pasquotank County	Devotion Davis
Pasquotank County	Edward Everagin
Pasquotank County	Joseph Jones
Perquimans County	Benjamin Harvey
Perquimans County	Miles Harvey
Perquimans County	Thomas Harvey
Perquimans County	Andrew Knox
Perquimans County	William Skinner
Pitt County	William Bryan
Pitt County	James Gorham
Pitt County	James Latham
Pitt County	Robert Salter
Pitt County	John Simpson
Rowan County	William Kennon
Rowan County	Matthew Locke
Rowan County	William Sharpe
Rowan County	James Smith
Rowan County	Samuel Young
Rowan County	Moses Winslow
Surry County	Martin Armstrong
Surry County	William Hill
Surry County	Robert Lanier
Surry County	Joseph Williams
Surry County	Joseph Winston
Tryon County	Robert Alexander
Tryon County	William Graham
Tryon County	Frederick Hambright
Tryon County	Joseph Harden
Tryon County	John Walker
Tyrrell County	Jeremiah Frazier
Tyrrell County	Thomas Hoskins
Tyrrell County	Stephen Lee
Tyrrell County	Joseph Spruill
Tyrrell County	Peter Wynn
Wake County	Thomas Hines
Wake County	John Hinton
Wake County	Theophilus Hunter
Wake County	Tignal Jones
Wake County	Joel Lane
Wake County	John Rand
Wake County	Michael Rogers
Bath Town	William Brown
Edenton	Jasper Charlton
Edenton	Joseph Hewes
New Bern	James Davis
New Bern	Richard Ellis
New Bern	Abner Nash
New Bern	William Tisdale
Wilmington	Cornelius Harnett
Wilmington	Archibald MacLaine
Brunswick	Maurice Moore
Halifax	Willie Jones
Hillsborough	William Armstrong
Hillsborough	Francis Nash
Hillsborough	Nathaniel Rochester
Salisbury	William Kennon
Salisbury	Hugh Montgomery
Campbelton (Note: Campbelton became part of Fayetteville, North Carolina, in 1783.)	James Hepburn
Campbelton	Robert Rowan
