= James Bunbury White =

American politician (1774–1819)

Member of the North Carolina Senate from Columbus County
- In office November 20, 1809 – December 22, 1810
- Succeeded by: Wynn Nance

Member of the North Carolina House of Commons from Bladen County
- In office November 17, 1806 – December 18, 1807 Serving with Amos Richardson and David Gillespie
- Preceded by: Michael Moulton
- Succeeded by: Thomas Brown; James Owen

Personal details
- Born: December 31, 1774 Bladen County, North Carolina
- Died: October 1, 1819 (aged 44) Whiteville, North Carolina
- Spouse: Rebecca Shipman
- Parents: James White (father); Bridget Day (mother)
- Occupation: Millwright; politician

James Bunbury White (December 31, 1774 – October 1, 1819) was an American politician and millwright. He was a member of both chambers of the North Carolina General Assembly, was the first to represent Columbus County in the North Carolina Senate, and was the founder of Whiteville, North Carolina.

== Biography ==
James Bunbury White was born December 31, 1774, and was the eldest son of James White and Bridget Day. James White was the sheriff of Bladen County and was a politician who represented Bladen County in the General Assembly and at the Second North Carolina Provincial Congress. James Bunbury White lived on his family plantation, Glen Etive Plantation, had one half-sibling, William Henry Beatty, born from his mother's first marriage, and was one of four siblings. His middle name Bunbury was the name of both his mother's uncle and brother.

James White, his father, had fallen deep into debt and died c. 1789. James Bunbury White's half-brother William Henry Beatty was appointed as the guardian of White and his siblings after the death of James White and managed the property of the late James White's estate. Acts were passed by the North Carolina General Assembly of 1789 that permitted Beatty to sell property of his father's estate to pay debts that were owed.

White was a millwright by trade and resided in Wilmington, North Carolina, in 1800. On December 31, 1804, White's 30th birthday, he purchased several large tracts of land of the western side of White Marsh in Columbus County. The tracts included White Marsh Castle, the home that John Burgwin had occupied before he moved to Wilmington, and the future site of Whiteville. He continued in the land trade and accumulated large land holdings. White was granted at least 98 tracts for 10,750 acres. He and his wife were owners of many slaves.

White was elected to the North Carolina House of Commons and represented Bladen County in 1806 and 1807. After Columbus County was established he became the first to represent the county in the North Carolina Senate. He was one of the men directed to decide the locations of the county jail and courthouse. In 1810, an act was passed that authorized White to "lay off a town on his own lands in the county of Columbus" and appointed five commissioners "for the purpose of laying off a town on the lands of the said James B. White, in the county aforesaid, at the place fixed on to erect the public buildings for said county; which town, when laid off by said commissioners, or a majority of them, shall be named Whitesville, and the lots thereof shall be for the sole benefit and disposal of the said James B. White." He was the first postmaster of the original Columbus County Courthouse.

White died on October 1, 1819, during an epidemic of yellow fever. He was buried on his family plantation, Glen Etive. White made his will in 1816, and it was proved in February 1820. He did not have any children with his wife Rebecca (née Shipman).

His wife Rebecca later married John Hardy White, a cousin of James Bunbury White and had one daughter, Mary Ann Rebecca White, who married Jefferson Buford, the politician in Alabama that organized the Buford Expedition to the Kansas Territory.

== Legacy ==
The city of Whiteville, North Carolina, is named after him. It was formerly known as Whitesville and the name was officially changed by the U.S. Post Office in 1889.

His memorial at the Columbus County Courthouse was accidentally knocked down in a car crash on December 9, 2019. No damage was done to the memorial and it was placed upright again on December 20, 2019.
