= General Bryan =

General Bryan may refer to:

- Blackshear M. Bryan (1900–1977), U.S. Army lieutenant general
- Goode Bryan (1811–1885), Confederate States Army brigadier general
- William Bryan (North Carolina politician) (1725–1781), North Carolina Militia brigadier general in the American Revolutionary War
