= Battle of Elizabethtown =

1781 battle of the American Revolutionary War

- Part of American Revolutionary War
| Date | August 27, 1781 |
| Location | Elizabethtown, North Carolina |
| Result | Patriot victory |

Belligerents
| (Kingdom of Great Britain) Loyalist militia | (United States) Patriot militia |

Commanders and leaders
| John Slingsby (DOW); David Godden (DOW) | Thomas Robeson; Thomas Brown |

Strength
| 300–400 militia | 60–70 militia |

Casualties and losses
| 17 killed | 4 wounded |

The Battle of Elizabethtown occurred on August 27, 1781 in Elizabethtown, North Carolina in Bladen County, North Carolina. The battle was fought between Patriot troops under the command of Thomas Robeson and Thomas Brown and the Loyalist North Carolina militia commanded by John Slingsby and David Godden. John Slingsby and David Godden were both mortally wounded and many of the soldiers fled the area into a ravine near the river, which has been known as "Tory Hole" ever since.

== Background ==
During the summer of 1781, a small group of approximately 60-70 Patriot militiamen were driven from their homes by Loyalist forces (Tories), and regrouped under the refuge of the Whigs of Duplin county. With little supplies and clothing remaining, they chose to return and fight for the land they had been driven from, appointing Thomas Brown and Robeson as their leaders. After gathering what ammunition they could, the men marched roughly fifty miles through wilderness terrain, surviving on dried meat and minimal bread. They arrived at the Cape Fear River near Elizabethtown, only to find no boats available for crossing. The Loyalists had removed them as a defensive measure. Nevertheless, the Patriots forded the river at night, carefully protecting their weapons and ammunition as they crossed. The Loyalist forces, numbering over three hundred and led by Colonel Slingsby and Colonel Godden, had fortified Elizabethtown and established strict security. However, the day before the battle, Sallie Salter, a local resident, entered the Loyalist camp to sell eggs. Unknown to the Loyalist forces, Salter was a spy for the Patriot cause. She reported to Colonels Thomas Robeson and Thomas Brown, commanders of a band of the Bladen County militia. The information Salter provided to both men led to them making a decision to attack the Loyalist encampment. Despite the fact that the Patriot forces were significantly outnumbered, Robeson and Brown fabricated a plan in which their forces would appear to be greater in number by masquerading false commands to "phantom" soldiers, intended to be heard by the enemy. The Patriot forces approached the Loyalist camp at night and launched a surprise attack.

== Battle ==
On the night before the Battle of Elizabethtown, the Patriot force, numbering sixty-nine men, prepared for their assault. In the middle of the night, they left one man behind to guard their horses, then undressed and waded across the Cape Fear River, where the water reached chest-deep. Once across, they dried off, dressed, and readied their weapons for battle. The men organized themselves into three groups of approximately twenty-five each and approached the Loyalist camp from multiple directions in total silence.

Their planned surprise attack was effective in routing and catching Colonel Slingsby, and his company of a notable number of Tories, off-guard. The first shot fired by a Tory guard would signal the full attack. As the Patriots silently advanced, a guard warned them three times but received no reply from the company. Finally, the Tory fired his weapon into the air and fled into the woods, triggering the Whigs to unleash a volley of bullets into the Loyalist camp. In the darkness, only the flashes of their gunfire could be seen. As they moved and approached from multiple directions in total silence, under the dark of night, the startled Loyalists were left confused of their total number of men. Shouting "Washington!" as their battle cry, the Patriots deepened the chaos, leading the Loyalists to believe they were under attack by General Washington’s entire army.

Most of the Loyalists fled once their commanding officers died, with many diving into a nearby ravine that would later be called "Tory Hole", while others escaped into nearby forests. At dawn, the Whigs found that seventeen Loyalists, including their commander Colonel Slingsby, had been killed. The Patriots suffered no fatalities and only four wounded.

== Present day ==
Today, among all American Revolutionary War battles in the Cape Fear region of North Carolina, the Battle of Elizabethtown ranks as the second most important battle. Not only did the Patriots succeed in at ending Tory control at the time, their victory prevented local Loyalists from ever gaining considerable power in the region again. To remark this, a historical marker was constructed on Elizabethtown's Main Street to commemorate the significant battle and locally famous "Tory Hole".

== See also ==
- List of American Revolutionary War battles
