= James White (North Carolina politician, died c. 1789) =

American politician (died circa 1789)

Member of the North Carolina House of Burgesses from Bladen County
- In office April 4, 1775 – April 8, 1775 Serving with William Saltar
- Preceded by: John Burgwin; Thomas Robeson Jr.

Delegate to the 2nd North Carolina Provincial Congress from Bladen County
- In office April 3, 1775 – April 7, 1775 Serving with William Saltar

Personal details
- Born: c. 1742 Bladen County, Province of North Carolina
- Died: c. 1789 Elizabethtown, North Carolina, United States
- Spouse: Bridget Day (m. 1770)
- Children: James Bunbury; Burgwin John; Anne Jane; Hays Graham
- Occupation: Sheriff; politician

Military service
- Branch/service: North Carolina militia
- Years of service: 1776–1781
- Rank: Captain
- Unit: Bladen County Regiment
- Battles/wars: American Revolutionary War

James White (c. 1742 – c. 1789) was an American politician in North Carolina who represented Bladen County in the North Carolina House of Burgesses and at the Second North Carolina Provincial Congress, both in New Bern in 1775. He was the sheriff of Bladen County by at least the year 1769 and remained in the position for several years in the 1770s. He was one of the five original directors and trustees of Elizabethtown, North Carolina, and was one of its five original commissioners. White died heavily indebted around the year 1789 and his stepson, William Henry Beatty, became the administrator of his estate. James Bunbury White, the founder of Whiteville, North Carolina, was one of his four children.

== Biography ==
James White, the son of John White, was born in Bladen County in the Province of North Carolina. John White, his father, and two others, had sent a petition in 1740 saying that Richard Everard (the son of the former governor Sir Richard Everard, 4th Baronet) was unqualified to represent Bladen County in the legislature, claiming Everard had "procured several unnaturalized foreigners and others not qualified... and that the sheriff was prevailed upon to close the polls abruptly" before several people who were in line with the purpose of voting could do so. John White was one of the men from Bladen County that were issued a commission of the peace and dedimus in 1749. John White transferred some property in Bladen County to two of his sons, James and Griffith, in a deed dated 1768. The earliest deed naming James White as sheriff of Bladen County is from 1769.

James White was a wealthy landowner and lived near Beatty's Bridge at Glen Etive Plantation, which had formerly been owned by Bunbury Day. He married Bridget Day, originally from County Longford, Ireland, in 1770, who was the niece of Bunbury Day. Shortly after their marriage, his wife arranged for her two-year-old son from her first marriage in Ireland, William Henry Beatty, to come to the Americas from Dublin accompanied by one of her sea-faring brothers, John Day. White transferred property of John Dolzall, deceased, to William Saltar in 1771. In 1772, property that was once owned by Bunbury Day was transferred in a deed from White to John Burgwin. White was named as one of the five original directors and trustees of Elizabethtown, North Carolina, in the law enacted by Josiah Martin, the council, and the North Carolina House of Burgesses in 1773. White was also named as one of the five commissioners.

In 1775, White represented Bladen County in the North Carolina House of Burgesses and the Second North Carolina Provincial Congress, both held in New Bern, alongside William Saltar.

James White was a captain of the Bladen County Regiment of the North Carolina militia in the American Revolutionary War from 1776 to 1781.

This James White has been confused with the James White who was a delegate to the Third, Fourth, and Fifth North Carolina Provincial Congresses who was from Currituck County by the United States House of Representatives on two of its websites. This James White of Bladen County is mentioned on the research collections information for the other James White as having sent a petition to the Fifth North Carolina Provincial Congress with William McRee which requested the assistance of the provincial congress to "secure property of William White, deceased, which fell into hands of now 'prisoners of this state.'"

White lived on the road from Wilmington to Fayetteville and owned a very large number of cattle. During the American Revolutionary War, White had his young stepson, William Henry Beatty, herd his cattle away from the Tories with two older African American men, likely his slaves, until the war ended.

After the Revolutionary War, currency had depreciated and was worth very little in real value. Although James White owned property and slaves, he did not have much in money. He died c. 1789 heavily indebted, and after his death his stepson was made the administrator of his estate. In the minutes of the North Carolina House of Commons meeting of December 6, 1789, it mentions that James White of Bladen County, deceased, had rented to a "James Kirkpatrick, Commissioner of the provision tax for said county, a House and Lott in the Town of Elizabeth, for the sum of Thirty-five pounds per annum." The deposition of Kirkpatrick indicated he had not "accounted with the said James White for the rents aforesaid, or debited the State in the settlement for his public accounts; therefore the Committee are of the opinion that it ought to be allowed, and recommend that the Comptroller be directed to a Certificate to the said Administrator, William Henry Batey, for the sum of Seventy pounds, the account of the two years rent." [sic]

In the meeting of December 12, 1789, it reads, "That after taking the memorial under their consideration and other papers relative thereto, your committee are of opinion, that as James White died very much involved in debt, that it would greatly distress his numerous family to sell off the personal part of the estate to discharge his said debts — And as there appears to be considerable of landed property that is at present of no use towards the support of the family of the deceased, and the administrator and the widow praying that the two tracts of land, lying in Bladen County, on Black River, and one house and lot in Elizabeth-Town, might be sold, in order to discharge the debts of the said estate — Your committees do therefore recommend that a law be passed, empowering the said administrator to sell the two tracts of land, and the house and lot aforesaid, and as the General Assembly have in many cases interferred to remedy those agrieved in similar circumstances, it appears to your committee that the necessity of the case will justify the interposition of the Legislature. Which is submitted." [sic]

The North Carolina General Assembly of 1789 passed a law to allow Beatty, the administrator of his estate, "to sell the Lands and Tenements herein mentioned."

Whereas it is represented to this Assembly, that James White, late of Bladen County, was, at the time of his decease, greatly indebted, and that if the personal estate were applied to the payment of his debts, his widow and children would be destitute of support; wherefore
I. Be it enacted by the General Assembly of the State of North Carolina, and it is hereby enacted by the authority of the same, That it shall be lawful for the said William Beaty, Administrator as aforesaid, to sell and convey one lot of land, with the appurtenances, number one hundred and thirteen, in Elizabeth-Town; three hundred and twenty acres of land on the east side of Lyon's swamp; and a tract of land on Black River, known by the names of Shaw's Old Field, all of which lands are situated in Bladen County aforesaid. And the said administrator is hereby empowered to make conveyances of the said lands to the purchasers, which shall be as effectual and valid in law, as if the same had been made by the said James White, in his lifetime.
II. And be it also enacted, That the said William Beaty shall advertise in the Fayetteville Gazette, the time and place to be appointed for the sale of the lands aforesaid, two months before such sale; and the same shall be sold on six months credit, the purchaser giving bond with sufficient security to the said Beaty, for payment of the purchase money.
III. And be it further enacted, That the said William Beaty shall apply the money arising from the sale of the lands aforesaid, to the payment of the debts of the said deceased; and the lands aforementioned, and the money which shall arise from the sale of the same, shall not be liable to dower of the widow of the said deceased, any law to the contrary notwithstanding."[sic]

After the act was passed, Beatty advertised in the Fayetteville Gazette that a house and lot in Elizabethtown, being of James White's estate, was to be sold on the first Monday of November 1790.

== Family ==
The White family was prominent in Bladen County, and several other members later became sheriffs, including, but not limited to, his brother Griffith Jones White and his nephew, Griffith John White, the son of his brother William White and Ann Simpson. James White had four children with his wife Bridget Day. All of their children were raised at Glen Etive Plantation in Bladen County. Bridget married John Andres after the death of James White.

- James Bunbury White (December 31, 1774–October 1, 1819) A member of the North Carolina House of Commons and the first to represent Columbus County in the North Carolina Senate.
- Burgwin John White (December 22, 1776–1800) Died at sea on his way from North Carolina to the West Indies in 1800.
- Anne Jane White (November 13, 1778–February 5, 1820) Died at Pleasant Retreat, the home of her half-brother William Henry Beatty.
- Hays Graham White (October 6, 1780–February 6, 1820) A major in the Regular Army. Promoted to captain of the 3rd Regiment of Infantry in 1811. A veteran of the War of 1812.

== Bibliography ==
- Beatty, Jr., Troy (1952). Beatty: A Family History – via the Internet Archive.
- Clark, Walter (1904). The State Records of North Carolina (PDF). Vol. XXIII. Goldsboro, North Carolina: Nash Brothers, Book and Job Printers – via Carolana.
- Hamersly, Thomas Holdup Stevens (1881). Complete Regular Army Register of the United States: For One Hundred Years, (1779 to 1879.) Together with the Volunteer General Staff during the War with Mexico and a Register of All Appointments by the President of the United States in the Volunteer Service during the Rebellion, with the Official Military Record of each Officer. Also, A Military History of the Department of War, and of each Staff Department of the Army. With various Tables relating to the Army and other important Military Information, Compiled from the Official Records. Washington D.C.: T. H. S. Hamersly – via the Internet Archive.
