= Poplar Grove (Scotts Hill, North Carolina) =

American plantation in North Carolina

- Poplar Grove Plantation
- U.S. National Register of Historic Places
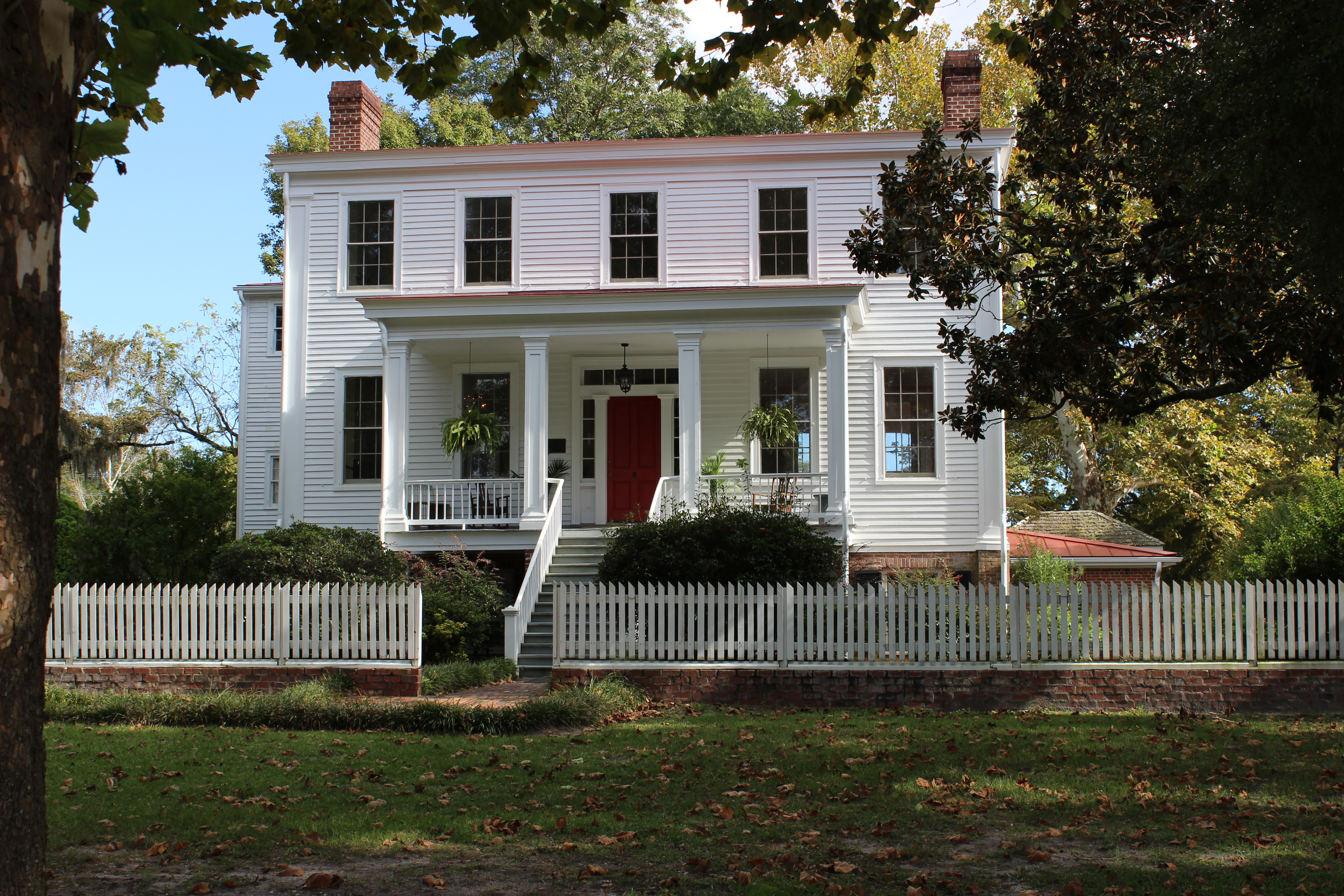

- Location within North Carolina Location within the United States
- Location: 10200 US Highway 17 North, Wilmington, North Carolina 28429
- Coordinates: 34°19′13″N 77°45′55″W
- Area: 14.2 acres (5.7 ha)
- Built: c. 1850
- Built by: The enslaved of Joseph M. Foy
- Architectural style: Greek Revival
- NRHP reference No.: 79003346
- Added to NRHP: July 16, 1979

Poplar Grove Plantation is a peanut plantation by the Topsail sound in Scotts Hill near Wilmington in Pender County, North Carolina. It was listed on the National Register of Historic Places listings in North Carolina on July 16, 1979.

== History ==
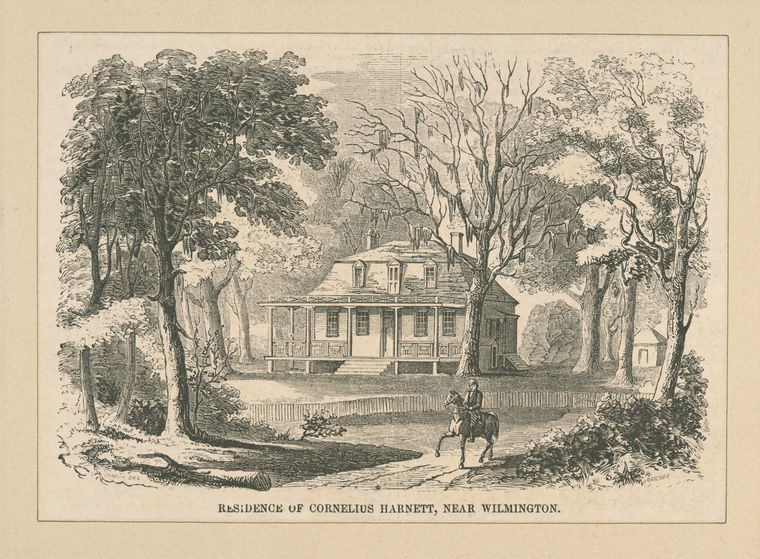
Cornelius Harnett's house

The plantation was originally owned by the widow of Cornelius Harnett. Later, the property, which once included Figure Eight Island, became the home of the Foy family, an American family of French Huguenot descent, from 1795 until 1971. The original plantation house was destroyed in a fire. The current house, a 12-room Greek Revival-style mansion, was built in the early 1850s by Joseph Mumford Foy. It was mistakenly referenced as being owned by Nicholas Nixon.

The Plantation is now under the care of Poplar Grove Foundation, Inc. Poplar Grove opened as a museum to the public in 1980.
