= Cornelius Harnett =

American Founding Father and politician

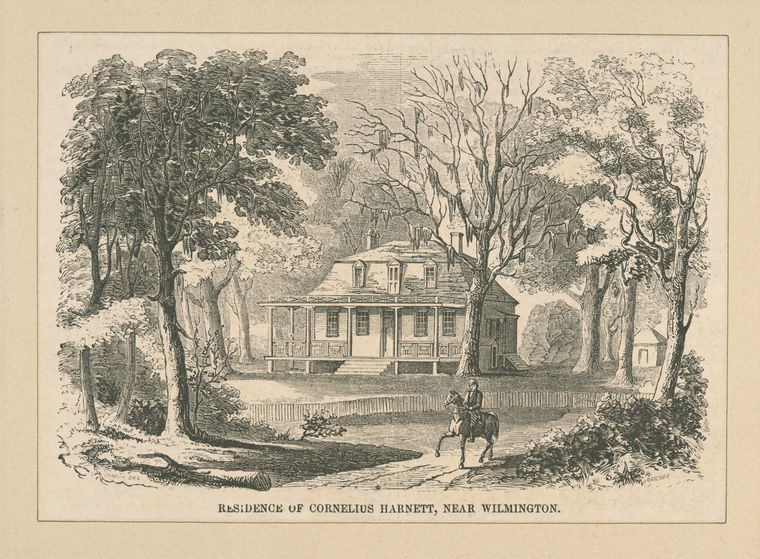
- Poplar Grove, near Wilmington, North Carolina
- Born: April 10, 1723; Chowan County, North Carolina
- Died: April 20, 1781 (aged 58); New Hanover County, North Carolina
- Occupation: Politician
- Spouse: Mary Holt

Cornelius Harnett (April 10, 1723 – April 20, 1781) was an American Founding Father, politician, merchant, plantation owner, and slaveholder from Wilmington, North Carolina. He was a leading American Revolutionary statesman in the Cape Fear region, and a delegate for North Carolina in the Continental Congress from 1777 to 1779 where he signed the Articles of Confederation. Cornelius Harnett is the namesake of Harnett County, North Carolina.

== Personal life ==
Harnett was born on April 10, 1723, to Cornelius and Elizabeth Harnett in Chowan County, North Carolina. Soon after he was born, his parents moved to Wilmington. As an adult, he obtained a plantation in Wilmington. He became a leading merchant there and was interested in farming, milling, and mercantile ventures. Harnett was an Episcopalian but has also been identified as a deist. Though he was an intelligent man, there is little known about his educational background. His intelligence served him well in his passion for politics.

Harnett married Mary Holt where they lived on his second plantation, Poplar Grove, located in Scotts Hill, which is north of Wilmington. During Harnett's political career, he maintained his relationship with his wife through letters.

Harnett's death came about after being captured and "thrown across a horse like a sack of meal". He was captured by the British upon their occupation of Wilmington in January 1781. His health steadily declined while imprisoned. He died April 20, 1781, shortly after being released on parole.

== Political career ==
In 1750 Harnett became involved in public affairs when he was elected Wilmington town commissioner. He was appointed a justice of the peace for New Hanover County by Governor Gabriel Johnston. Harnett was elected to represent Wilmington in the North Carolina House of Burgesses in 1754 and 1775.

In 1765, Harnett became the chairman of the Sons of Liberty and was a leader in the resistance to the Stamp Act. In 1775–1776, he served as the first president of the North Carolina Provincial Council, or Council of Safety, essentially the chief executive of the revolutionary state, although with limited powers. In 1776, he was excepted by Sir Henry Clinton from his proclamation of general amnesty. He was a member of the Continental Congress for 1777–1779. He is a signatory to the Articles of Confederation.

Harnett was delegate from Wilmington to the 1st, 2nd, 3rd, and 4th North Carolina Provincial Congress. He was a delegate from Brunswick County and Vice President of the Fifth North Carolina Provincial Congress.

== See also ==
- Founding Fathers of the United States

== Notes ==
Government offices
New creation	President of the North Carolina Provincial Congress; 1776	Succeeded by Samuel Ashe
