= North Carolina Provincial Congress =

Historical legislature of the province of North Carolina

- Continental Union Flag

Type
- Type: Unicameral

History
- Founded: August 25, 1774
- Disbanded: December 23, 1776
- Succeeded by: North Carolina General Assembly

The Provincial Congress of North Carolina was an extralegal representative assembly patterned after the colonial lower house that existed in North Carolina from 1774 to 1776. It led the transition from British provincial to U.S. state government in North Carolina. It established a revolutionary government, issued bills of credit to finance the provincial government, provided for the common defense, and adopted the state's first constitution.

There were five terms of congress. They met in the towns of Newbern (first and second), Hillsborough (third), and Halifax (fourth and fifth). The fourth congress approved the Halifax Resolves, the first resolution of one of United Colonies to call for American independence. Five months later it would authorize the state's delegates to the Continental Congress to vote for independence. The fifth congress approved a state constitution and elected Richard Caswell governor. In 1777, the newly established General Assembly convened at New Bern.

== Origins ==
Massachusetts' young and ardent Boston patriot, Josiah Quincy Jr. visited North Carolina staying five days. He spent the night of March 26, 1773 at Cornelius Harnett's home near Wilmington. The two discussed and drew up plans for a Committee of Correspondence. The North Carolina Committee of Correspondence's purpose was to communicate circumstances and revolutionary sentiment among the Thirteen Colonies. The North Carolina Committee of Correspondence formed in December 1773 in Wilmington. Although Cornelius Harnett was absent, he was made chairman of the committee. Other members included John Harvey, Robert Howe, Richard Caswell, Edward Vail, John Ashe, Joseph Hewes, Samuel Johnston, and William Hooper.

The function of the committees in each colony was to inform the voters of the common threat faced by all the colonies, and to disseminate information from the main cities to the rural hinterlands where most of the colonists lived. As news was typically spread in hand-written letters or printed pamphlets to be carried by couriers on horseback or aboard ships, the committees were responsible for ensuring that this news accurately reflected the views of their parent governmental body on a particular issue and was dispatched to the proper groups. The committee supervised the election of the first Provincial Congress in North Carolina.

== History ==
Five extra-legal unicameral bodies called the North Carolina Provincial Congresses met beginning in the summer of 1774. They were modeled after the colonial lower house (House of Commons). These congresses created a government structure, issued bills of credit to pay for the movement, organized an army for defense, wrote a constitution and bill of rights that established the state of North Carolina, and elected their first acting governor in the fifth congress that met in 1776. These congresses paved the way for the first meeting of the North Carolina state Legislature on April 7, 1777, in Newbern.

=== First Provincial Congress ===
The first such congress met at Governor's Palace, Newbern, from August 25 to 27, 1774. It was the first such gathering anywhere in the Thirteen Colonies held in defiance of British orders. Its moderator (president) was John Harvey, who was concurrently the last speaker of the Province of North Carolina General Assembly of 1775 House of Burgesses. This first provincial congress, with 69 delegates from 30 of the then-36 counties, approved the calling of a Continental Congress and elected William Hooper, Joseph Hewes, and Richard Caswell as the colony's delegates thereto. The congress also approved a trade boycott to protest British actions against New England.

=== Second Provincial Congress ===
The second congress also met at Newbern, from April 3 to 7, 1775. John Harvey once again served as moderator. The congress met at the same place and almost the same time as the colonial assembly, and had almost exactly the same membership. This infuriated the royal governor, Josiah Martin, who dissolved the colonial legislature on April 8 and never called another. This congress approved the Continental Association, an economic boycott of Great Britain authorized by the First Continental Congress. Just after this congress met, news reached North Carolina about the Battle of Lexington and Concord in Massachusetts. Following this news, Governor Josiah Martin fled and this ended the royal government in the Province. The first military action occurred on July 18 when patriots burned Fort Johnston, where Governor Martin had transferred his headquarters.

=== Third Provincial Congress ===
The third congress met in Hillsborough, from August 20 to September 10, 1775. Its president was Samuel Johnston (Harvey had recently died). This congress, which included representatives of every county and town, officially established itself as the highest governmental body in the province (British Governor Martin had fled, ending royal government). To govern North Carolina when the congress was not in session, a 13-member Provincial Council, or Council of Safety, was elected, constituting the first executive body in North Carolina free of British rule. Cornelius Harnett was elected as the first president of the council. The congress divided the state into six military districts for purposes of organizing militia and for determining representation on the council. These districts included Edenton, Halifax, Hillsborough, Newbern, Salisbury, and Wilmington. Later, an additional district, Morgan, was added for the western part of the state, including counties that eventually became part of Tennessee (Davidson, Greene, and Washington).

=== Fourth Provincial Congress ===
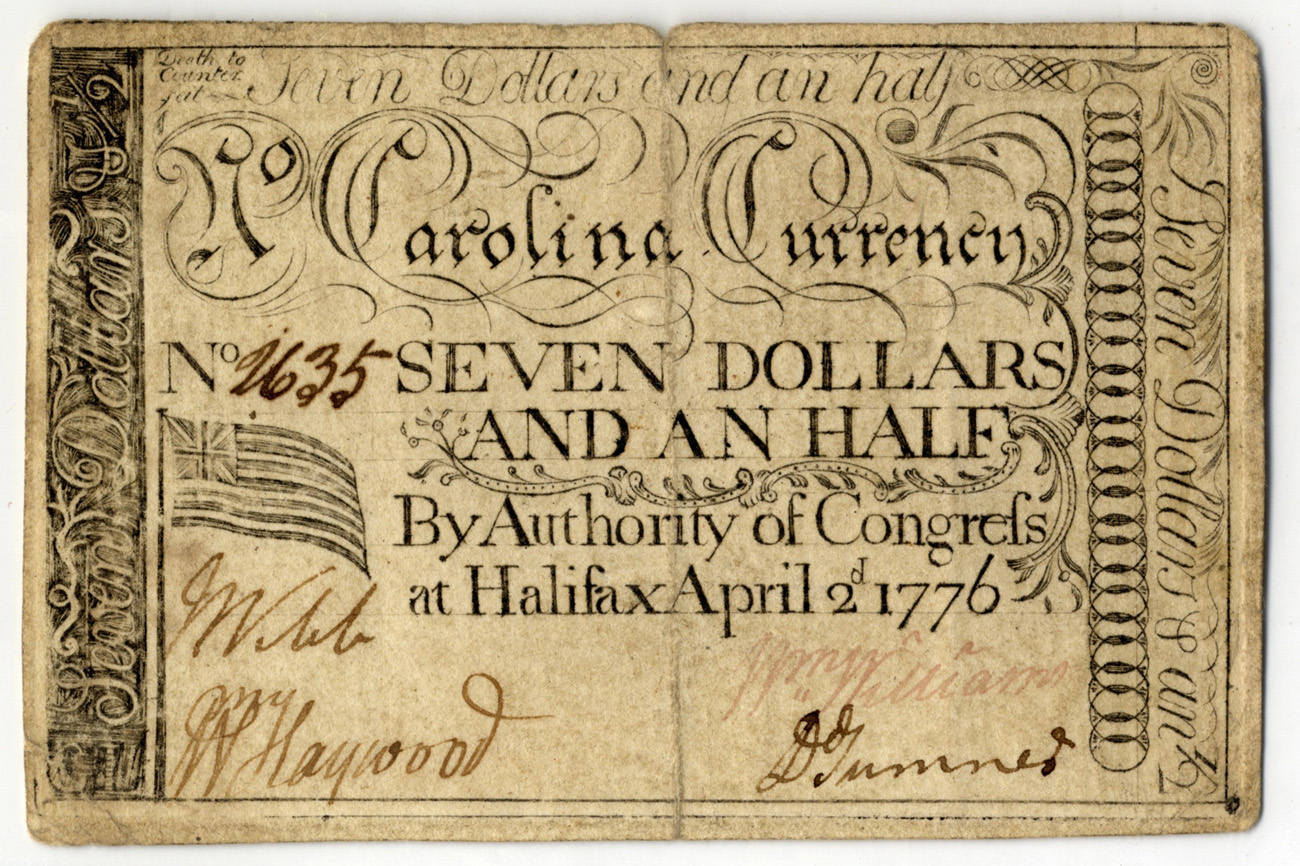
North Carolina $7½ bill issued at Halifax on April 2, 1776, featuring the Continental Union Flag fully hoisted.

In the present day, the fourth North Carolina Provincial Congress is sometimes referred to as the "Halifax Assembly." The fourth congress, also presided over by Samuel Johnston, met in Halifax, from April 4 to May 14, 1776. Allen Jones served as vice-president. This congress passed what became known as the Halifax Resolves, the first "official" endorsement of independence from Great Britain by one of the Thirteen Colonies. Joseph Hewes presented the Halifax Resolves to the Continental Congress on May 27, the same day that Virginia delegates presented similar resolves.

=== Fifth Provincial Congress ===
The Fifth and last Provincial Congress met at Halifax from November 12 to December 23, 1776. Richard Caswell served as president, with Cornelius Harnett as vice-president. This congress approved the first Constitution of North Carolina, along with a "Declaration of Rights." It elected Caswell to serve as acting governor until the province's first General Assembly could meet to elect a governor.
