= William Saltar =

American politician (1732–1802)

Member of the North Carolina House of Burgesses from Bladen County
- In office April 4, 1775 – April 8, 1775 Serving with James White
- Preceded by: John Burgwin; Thomas Robeson Jr.
Provincial Congresses
Delegate to the
1st North Carolina Provincial Congress
from Bladen County
In office
August 25, 1774 – August 27, 1774
Serving with Walter Gibson
Delegate to the
2nd North Carolina Provincial Congress
from Bladen County
In office
April 3, 1775 – April 7, 1775
Serving with James White
Delegate to the
3rd North Carolina Provincial Congress
from Bladen County
In office
August 20, 1775 – September 10, 1775
Serving with Walter Gibson, Thomas Owen, Nathaniel Richardson, Thomas Robeson Jr.

Personal details
- Born: 1732 New Hanover Precinct, Bath County, Province of North Carolina
- Died: 1802 (aged 69–70) Bladen County, North Carolina, U.S.
- Spouse: Sarah "Sallie" Lloyd (died 1800)
- Burial place: Elizabethtown, North Carolina, U.S.

William Saltar II (Note: His name is often written as William Saltar or William Salter. Saltar's name is written William Salter II on the monument dedicated to both him and his wife in Elizabethtown. He signed his own name William Saltar. The name of his father was also William Saltar and it is written the same way when his father was a witness to a will in 1737.) (1732–1802) was an American politician in North Carolina that represented Bladen County in the North Carolina House of Burgesses and at the first, second, and third North Carolina Provincial Congresses. He was a director, trustee, and commissioner of Elizabethtown and is buried there. During the American Revolutionary War, he was chosen as colonel of the Bladen County militia but declined it. His wife Sarah "Sallie" Saltar (née Lloyd) spied on a Tory camp led by John Slingsby under the pretense of selling eggs, eggs and socks, or baked goods, later reporting to Thomas Brown and Thomas Robeson Jr. before the Battle of Elizabethtown.

== Biography ==
William Saltar II was born in 1732 and was the son of William Saltar.

Saltar was named as one of the five original directors and trustees of Elizabethtown, North Carolina, in the law enacted by Josiah Martin, the council, and the North Carolina House of Burgesses in 1773. Saltar was also named as one of the five commissioners. Saltar represented Bladen County at the First North Carolina Provincial Congress in 1774 alongside Walter Gibson.

He represented Bladen County at the Second North Carolina Provincial Congress and the North Carolina House of Burgesses in New Bern in April 1775 alongside James White. On July 20, 1775, Saltar was a visitor from Bladen County to a monthly meeting of the Safety Committee of the Town of Wilmington.

Saltar also represented Bladen County at the Third North Carolina Provincial Congress at Hillsborough in 1775 alongside Walter Gibson, Thomas Owen (the father of governor John Owen and U.S. congressman James Owen), Nathaniel Richardson, and Thomas Robeson Jr.

According to the testimony of Revolutionary War Pensioner John Darrach of Bladen County, William Saltar was chosen colonel of the militia with Thomas Robeson Jr. but Saltar declined and was given a verbal discharge from captain Maturin Colville to return to his home. Maturin Colville was a captain of the Bladen County Regiment of the North Carolina militia until he was discharged shortly after the Battle of Moore's Creek Bridge on the suspicion of being a Loyalist. The suspicions were correct and Colville became a colonel of the Loyalist militia of Bladen County. Colville was later captured and killed by Patriots.

Salter died in 1802.

== Legacy ==
William Saltar II and his wife Sarah "Sallie" Saltar (née Lloyd) had one son that had heirs, Richard Saltar, and several daughters. During the Revolutionary War, his wife Sarah "Sallie" Saltar (née Lloyd) spied on the Tory camp led by John Slingsby under the pretense of selling eggs, eggs and socks, or baked goods, and afterwards reported to Thomas Brown and Thomas Robeson Jr. before the Battle of Elizabethtown. A monument to William Saltar II and his wife Sarah "Sallie" Saltar is located at the Elizabethtown Court House.

His estate was subject to at least one North Carolina Supreme Court case, Archibald McKay, Guardian, &c. v. William Hendon and Alexander McKay, Eliza McKay, and John McKay v. William Hendon, which settled an inheritance dispute between the surviving sibling and the half-siblings of his grandson through his son Richard, William James Saltar, who had no children.

== Bibliography ==
- Clark, Walter (1904). The State Records of North Carolina (PDF). Vol. XXIII. Goldsboro, North Carolina: Nash Brothers, Book and Job Printers – via Carolana.
- Grimes, John Bryan (1910). Abstract of North Carolina Wills compiled from Original and Recorded Wills in the Office of the Secretary of State. Raleigh, North Carolina: E. M. Uzzell & Co., State Printers and Binders – via East Carolina University.
- Melvin, Lionel Dane (1988). Remember Our Melvins and Kin. H. Eaton Historical Publications – via Google Books.
- Murphey, Archibald DeBow (1821). Reports of Cases Argued and Adjudged in the Supreme Court of North-Carolina, During the Year 1819. Vol. III. Raleigh: J. Gales – via Google Books.
- Waddell, Alfred Moore (1909). A History of New Hanover County and the Lower Cape Fear Region. Vol. I:1723–1800. Wilmington: Alfred Moore Waddell – via East Carolina University.
- Wheeler, John Hill (1851). Historical Sketches of North Carolina, From 1584 to 1851. Compiled from Original Records, Official Documents, and Traditional Statements. With Biographical Sketches of her Distinguished Statesmen, Jurists, Lawyers, Soldiers, Divines, Etc. Vol. I. Philadelphia: Lippincott, Grambo and Co. – via the Internet Archive.
