= William Bryan (North Carolina politician) =

American politician

- Born: October 23, 1724; Bertie Precinct, North Carolina, British America
- Died: November 28, 1781 (aged 57) Johnston County, North Carolina, U.S.
- Allegiance: 1775-1776 (United Colonies); 1776-1781 (United States)
- Branch: North Carolina militia
- Service years: 1775–1781
- Rank: Brigadier General
- Commands: Johnston County Regiment, New Bern District Brigade
- Conflicts: American Revolutionary War; Battle of Moore's Creek Bridge; Battle of Brier Creek; Battle of Guilford Court House
- Spouse: Elizabeth Smith (m. 1744)
- Children: 6 sons and 3 daughters

William Bryan (23 October 1724 – 28 November 1781) was a Brigadier General over the New Bern District Brigade in the North Carolina militia during the American Revolution. He was also active in North Carolina politics and was a delegate to North Carolina's Third Provincial Congress in Hillsborough in August 1775 and represented Johnston County, North Carolina in the North Carolina House of Commons in 1778–1779.

== Early life ==
He was born on October 23, 1724, in Bertie Precinct, Province of North Carolina. His parents were Needham Bryan and Anne Rombeau. In 1744, he married Elizabeth Smith with whom he had nine children: Lewis, William M., Arthur, Elizabeth, Hardy, Blake, Esther, Susannah, and John.

He was a delegate to the North Carolina Provincial Congress when it met in Hillsborough in August 1775. He was later elected to represent Johnston County in the North Carolina House of Commons in the 1778–1779 legislative session. He served on the Committee of Correspondence of the legislature and was also a local justice of the peace.

== Military service ==
He was appointed as a Lieutenant Colonel in the Johnston County Regiment of the North Carolina militia under Colonel Needham Bryan on September 9, 1775. He saw action at the Battle of Moore's Creek Bridge on February 27, 1776, with this regiment. On April 22, 1776, he was promoted to colonel as commandant of the Johnston County Regiment after Colonel Needham Bryan resigned his commission.

On April 22, 1776, he was appointed as brigadier general and commander of the New Bern District Brigade when General Richard Caswell left this position to become the first governor of North Carolina. He led the brigade at the Battle of Brier Creek in Georgia on March 3, 1779. He resigned his commission on April 27, 1779, and returned to life as a civilian politician, except for a short re-activation as commander of the Johnston County Regiment at the Battle of Guilford Court House on March 15, 1781.

== Death ==
He died in Johnston County, North Carolina, on November 28, 1781. Some biographers say that he and his son Lewis were poisoned by one of his slaves. The Johnston County Court minutes for November 1780 give an account of the trial and conviction of a slave named Jenny, who poisoned Needham Bryan and other members of his family. Jenny was burned at the stake in Smithfield, North Carolina, for the murders of three members of the Bryan family.
