= Joseph Jones (North Carolina politician) =

American politician

Joseph Jones was a member of the Province of North Carolina House of Burgesses, First North Carolina Provincial Congress, and North Carolina State Senate.
