= Roger Ormond =

North Carolinian statesman (1740–1775)

Roger Ormond or Ormand (ca. 1740 – December 1775) was an early North Carolinian statesman. He served on the Royal council of North Carolina, in the Lower House and Upper House representing Bath, North Carolina. He was also the Assistant Attorney General of North Carolina during this period. In the American Revolution, he served on the committee of safety in Beaufort County. He was one of the men who read to the citizens of Bath about the battles of Lexington and Concord. He was a member of the Third North Carolina Provincial Congress, which met in Hillsborough on August 20, 1775. He was sent with William Salter, John Patten, John Cowper, and Thomas Respress to represent Bath and the Beaufort district. He was appointed a major in the Beaufort County Regiment of the North Carolina militia by the congress, where he served from 1775–1776. His brother Wyriott Ormand also served as an officer in the Beaufort County Regiment.
