= Joseph Spruill =

American vestryman (1697–1764)

Joseph Spruill (~1697 - 1764) was a vestryman of South Chowan Parish, a major in the Tyrrell County Regiment of the North Carolina militia, magistrate, and supervisor of "The King's High Roads." Joseph also was the sheriff of Tyrrell County, North Carolina. He was a representative to the Province of North Carolina House of Burgesses in 1775 and the First North Carolina Provincial Congress.

Joseph Spruill was the son of Dr. Godfrey Spruill, the patriarch of the Spruill family in the United States and the first doctor in North Carolina.

== Sources ==
- "The Spruills--a Family of Colonial Notables" by David E. Davis printed in Our State magazine. August 1, 1964.
