= John Harvey (North Carolina politician) =

John Harvey (December 11, 1724 – May 3, 1775) was a legislative leader in the Province of North Carolina and subsequently a leader in the creation of the revolutionary movement in the province.

== Life story ==
From 1766 through 1769 and from 1773 through 1775, Harvey, a resident of Perquimans County, was the Speaker of the Province of North Carolina House of Burgesses.

While still serving as Speaker, Harvey served as moderator, or president, of the first and second North Carolina Provincial Congresses (1774 and 1775). The first congress, for which Harvey had distributed handbills urging people to elect delegates, was supposedly "the first popular assembly anywhere in America, called by the people and held in the presence of the king's officers, in direct disobedience to British authority." At the first congress, he represented Onslow County, while at the second, he was a delegate from Perquimans County, where he actually lived. He died sometime between April and August 1775.

During World War II, the Liberty Ship SS John Harvey was built, in his honor, at a shipyard in Wilmington, North Carolina.
