= North Carolina General Assembly of 1781 =

One session of the general assembly of North Carolina held in 1781

5th North Carolina General Assembly (1781)
←	1780	1782	→

Overview
- Legislative body: North Carolina General Assembly
- Jurisdiction: North Carolina, United States
- Meeting place: Bloomsbury, Raleigh, North Carolina
- Term: 1781

Senate
- Members: 50 Senators (50 counties, including Washington District/County)
- Speaker: Alexander Martin
- Clerk: John Haywood

House of Commons
- Members: 106 Representatives authorized (50 counties with 2 each, 6 districts with 1 each)
- Speaker: Thomas Benbury
- Clerk: John Hunt

Sessions
- 1st: June 23, 1781 – July 14, 1781

The North Carolina General Assembly of 1781 met in Wake Court House (also known as Bloomsbury) from June 23 to July 14, 1781. Each of the 50 North Carolina counties were allowed one Senator and two members of the House of Commons; 6 districts/boroughs towns also elected one House member each.

== Leadership ==
- Speaker of the House: Thomas Benbury (Chowan County)
- Clerk of the House: John Hunt (unknown county)
- Speaker of the North Carolina Senate: Alexander Martin Guilford County
- Cleark of the Senate: John Haywood (Edgecombe County)

The governor of North Carolina during the time of this session of the legislature was Thomas Burke, who was elected by the General Assembly in June of 1781. James Glasgow served as Secretary of State and James Iredell served as Attorney General.

=== Councilors of State ===
Councilor John Penn

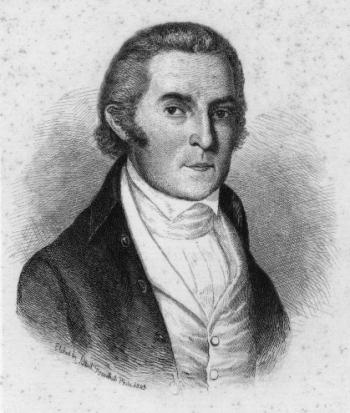
Councilor Willie Jones

The North Carolina Constitution of 1776 required "that the Senate and House of Commons, jointly, at their first meeting after each annual election, shall by ballot elect seven persons to be a Council of State for one year, who shall advise the Governor in the execution of his office."

The known North Carolina Council of State members elected by the General Assembly in 1781 included:

- June 26, 1781 John Penn, Granville County
- June 26, 1781 Spruce Macay, Rowan County
- June 26, 1781 Willie Jones, Halifax County
- June 26, 1781 Benjamin Seawell, Franklin County
- June 26, 1781 Philemon Hawkins, Jr., Granville County (declined to serve)
- June 26, 1781 John Butler, Orange County
- June 26, 1781 Edward Jones, Warren County
- July 11, 1781 Whitmel Hill, Martin County

== Members ==
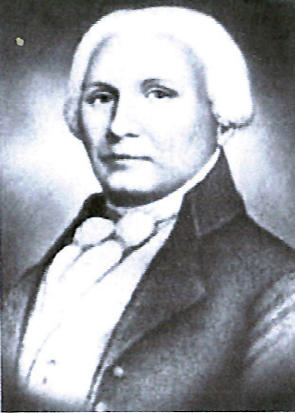
Rep. Joseph McDowell, Jr

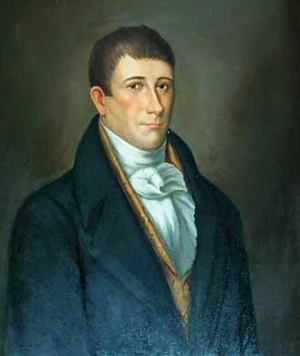
Sen. Benjamin Williams

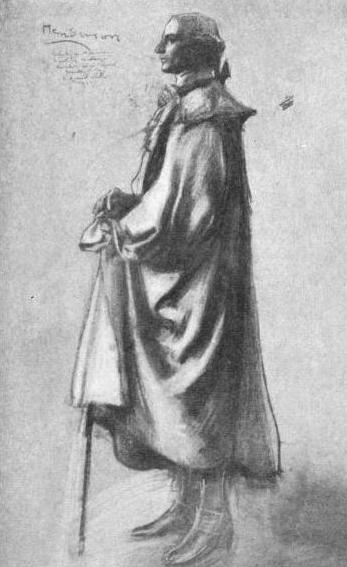
Rep. Richard Henderson

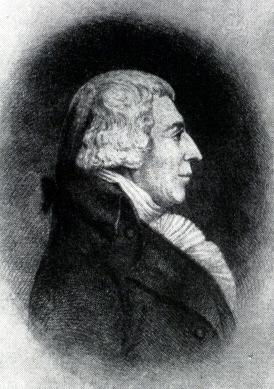
Rep. Richard Dobbs Spaight

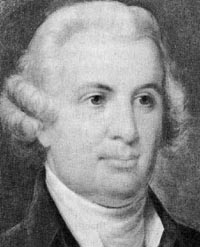
Rep. William Hooper

County or District/City	House of Commons Member	Senate Member
Anson County	Vacant (no election held)	Vacant (no election held)
Beaufort County	Thomas Alderson	William Brown
Beaufort County	Charles Crawford	
Beaufort County	Thomas A. Grist	
Bertie County	William Horne	Jonathan Jaycocks
Bertie County	David Turner	
Bladen County	Samuel Cain	unknown or vacant
Bladen County	Unknown or Vacant	
Brunswick County	Vacant (no election held)	vacant (no election held)
Brunswick County	Vacant (no election held)	
Burke County	Hugh Brevard (died)	Andrew Wood
Burke County	Joseph McDowell, Jr.	
Camden County	Vacant (no election held)	Vacant (no election held)
Camden County	Vacant (no election held)	
Carteret County	John Easton	Unknown or vacant
Carteret County	Unknown or Vacant	
Caswell County	Josiah Cole	Unknown or vacant
Caswell County	Unknown or Vacant	
Chatham County	James Williams	Ambrose Ramsey
Chatham County	John Luttrell (Note: John Luttrell was killed while in office leading the Chatham County Regiment at the Battle of Lindley's Mill on September 13, 1781.)	
Chowan County	Thomas Benbury	Charles Johnson
Chowan County	Michael Payne	
Chowan County	Edmund Blount	
Craven County	William Bryan	James Coor
Craven County	John Tilghman (Tilman)	
Cumberland County	David Smith	Ebenezer Folsome
Cumberland County	Thomas Armstrong	
Currituck County	James Phillips	Samuel Jarvis
Currituck County	John Humphreys	
Dobbs County	Benjamin Sheppard	Unknown or vacant
Dobbs County	William Caswell	
Duplin County	Thomas Hicks	James Kenan
Duplin County	John Molton	
Edgecombe County	Henry Irwin Toole	Elisha Battle
Edgecombe County	James Wilson	
Edgecombe County	Robert Diggs	
Franklin County	William Brickell	Henry Hill
Franklin County	William Green	
Gates County	Jethro Sumner	James Gregory
Gates County	Joseph Riddick	
Granville County	Thomas Person	Joseph Taylor
Granville County	Richard Henderson	
Guilford County	James Hunter	Alexander Martin
Guilford County	William Gowdy	
Halifax County	John Branch, Sr.	Oroondates Davis
Halifax County	Benjamin McCulloch (Note: Benjamin McCulloch, Edward Nicholson, Jeduthan Harper, and Burwell Mooring were disqualified from taking their seats in the House of Commons since they were considered to be Prisoners on Parole. New elections were ordered for August.)	
Hertford County	Lewis Brown	Pleasant Jordan
Hertford County	Thomas Brickell	
Hyde County	Robert Latham	William Russell
Hyde County	Robert Jennett	
Johnston County	Joseph Boone	Benjamin Williams
Johnston County	Hardy Bryan	
Jones County	Frederick Hargett	Nathan Bryan
Jones County	Edward Whitty	
Lincoln County	Robert Alexander	James Johnston
Lincoln County	John Sloan	
Martin County	Samuel Smithwick	Kenneth McKenzie
Martin County	Samuel Williams	
Mecklenburg County	Caleb Phifer	Robert Irwin
Mecklenburg County	David Wilson	
Montgomery County	Robert Moss	Thomas Childs
Montgomery County	Peter Randle	
Nash County	Joseph Arrington	Hard Griffin
Nash County	Edward Nicholson*	
New Hanover County	Thomas Bloodworth	John DeVane
New Hanover County	Caleb Grainger	
Northampton County	John Dawson	James Vaughan
Northampton County	James Sikes	
Onslow County	Edward Starkey	John Spicer
Onslow County	Lewis Williams	
Orange County	Jesse Benton	John Butler
Orange County	Robert Campbell	
Pasquotank County	Unknown or vacant	Edward Everagain
Pasquotank County	Unknown or vacant	
Perquimans County	John Whedbee	Jesse Eaton
Perquimans County	Jonathan Skinner	
Pitt County	James Gorham	Edward Salter
Pitt County	George Evans	
Randolph County	Andrew Balfour	
Randolph County	Absalom Tatum	John Collier
Randolph County	Jeduthan Harper	
Richmond County	Edward Williams	Charles Medlock
Richmond County	Charles Medlock	
Rowan County	William Sharpe	Matthew Locke
Rowan County	Samuel Young	
Rutherford County	James Withrow	William Porter
Rutherford County	George Moore	
Rutherford County	David Miller	
Sullivan County (became part of Tennessee)	Unknown or vacant	Unknown or vacant
Sullivan County (became part of Tennessee)	Unknown or vacant	
Surry County	Samuel Cummings	William Shepherd
Surry County	Wilson T. Lewis	
Tyrrell County	Isham Webb	
Tyrrell County	John Harrington	Jeremiah Frazier
Tyrrell County	Nehemiah Norman	
Wake County	Burwell Pope	Michael Rogers
Wake County	James Hinton	
Warren County	Joseph Hawkins	Nathaniel Macon
Warren County	John Macon	
Washington County (became part of Tennessee)	Unknown or vacant	Unknown or vacant
Washington County (became part of Tennessee)	Unknown or vacant	
Wayne County (newly established in 1779)	Joseph Green	Unknown or vacant
Wayne County (newly established in 1779)	Burwell Mooring*	
Wilkes County	Joseph Herndon	Charles Gordon
Wilkes County	William Lenoir	
Edenton District	Robert Smith	
Halifax District	Henry Montfort	
Hillsborough District	Thomas Tullock	
New Bern District	Richard Dobbs Spaight	
Salisbury District	Anthony Newman (Nunan)	
Wilmington District	William Hooper	

== See also ==
- List of North Carolina state legislatures
