= North Carolina General Assembly of 1782 =

Legislative term in US state of North Carolina

6th North Carolina General Assembly (1782)
←	1781	1783	→

Overview
- Legislative body: North Carolina General Assembly
- Jurisdiction: North Carolina, United States
- Meeting place: Hillsborough
- Term: 1782

Senate
- Members: 50 Senators authorized
- Speaker: Alexander Martin, Richard Caswell

House of Commons
- Members: 106 Representatives authorized
- Speaker: Thomas Benbury

Sessions
- 1st: April 15, 1782 – May 18, 1782

The North Carolina General Assembly of 1782 was the state legislature that first convened in Hillsborough, North Carolina, on April 15, 1782, and concluded on May 18, 1782. Members of the North Carolina Senate and the North Carolina House of Commons were elected by eligible North Carolina voters.

The General Assembly elected Alexander Martin of Guilford County as Governor on April 26, 1782. James Glasgow was Secretary of State. James Iredell was Attorney General. There was no Lieutenant Governor of North Carolina until 1868.

== Councilors of State ==
John Penn

The General Assembly elected the following Councilors of State on May 3, 1782:

- Richard Henderson of Granville County
- Allen Jones of Northampton County
- Spruce Macay of Rowan County
- Philemon Hawkins II of Granville County
- Griffith Rutherford of Rowan County
- Benjamin Seawell of Franklin County
- John Penn of Granville

== Members ==
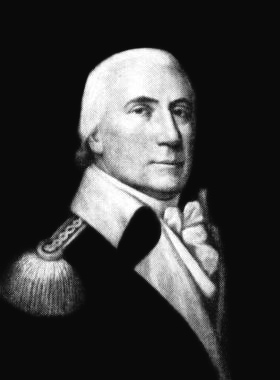
Governor Alexander Martin

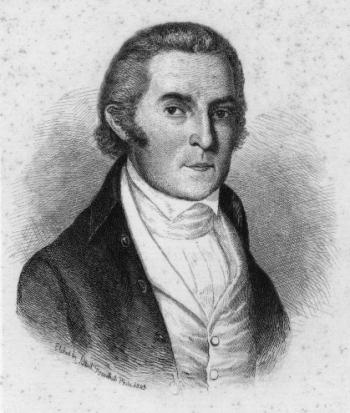
Sen. Willie Jones

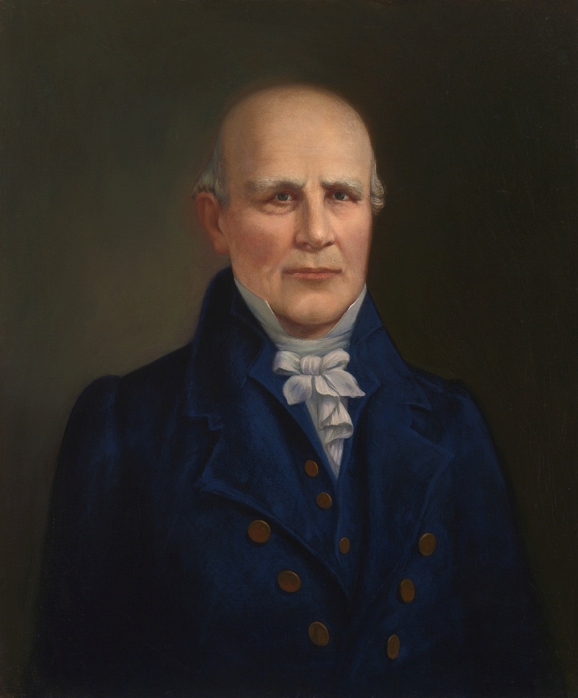
Sen. Nathaniel Macon

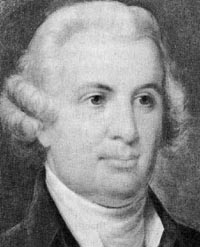
Rep. William Hooper

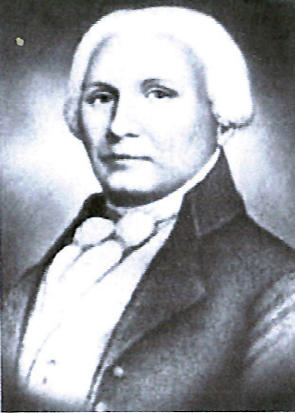
Rep. Joseph McDowell, Jr

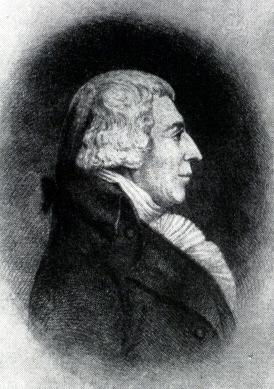
Rep. Richard Dobbs Spaight

There was one Senator and two members of the House of Commons for each of the 50 counties. In addition, each of the six districts had one representative each.

The House of Commons leadership and staff included: Thomas Benbury, Speaker; John Hunt, Clerk; and Lovett Burgess Assistant Clerk.

County/District	Senate Member	House Member	House Member
Anson County	Thomas Wade	Stephen Miller	John Jackson
Beaufort County	William Brown	Richard Nassau Stephens	John Gray Blount
Bertie County	Jonathan Jaycocks	William Horn	David Turner
Bladen County	Thomas Brown	Benjamin Clark	John Willis
Brunswick County	Archibald McClain/Alfred Moore	William Waters	Dennis Hawkins
Burke County	Charles McDowell	Waightstill Avery	Joseph McDowell
Camden County	Isaac Gregory	Dempsey Sawyer	Benjamin Jones
Carteret County	Unknown	Unknown	Unknown
Caswell County	John Williams	William Moore	Josiah Cole
Chatham County	William B. Smith/James Williams	James Williams/Elisha Cain	John Ledhill/Matthew Ramsey
New Bern District		Richard Dobbs Spaight, Sr.	
Chowan County	Joseph Blount	Michael Payne	Thomas Benbury (Note: Thomas Benbury was elected Speaker of the House of Commons.)
Craven County	James Coor	William Bryan	John Tillman/Tilghman
Cumberland County	James Atkins	Edward Winslow	Thomas Armstrong
Currituck County	William Ferebee	Thomas Jarvis	Joseph Ferebee
Dobbs County	Richard Caswell, Sr. (2nd Speaker)	William Caswell	Benjamin Sheppard
Duplin County	James Kenan	Richard Clinton/David Dodd	James Gillespie
Edgecombe County	Isaac Sessums	Robert Diggs/Etheldred Phillips	James Wilson
Franklin County	Henry Hill	Simon Jeffreys	Harrison Macon
Gates County	William Baker	Jethro Sumner	Joseph Riddick
Granville County	William Gill	Thomas Person	Philemon Hawkins, Jr.
Guilford County	Alexander Martin (Speaker, Governor)	William Gowdy	James Hunter
Halifax County	Willie Jones	John Branch	Benjamin McCulloch
Halifax District		Henry Montfort	
Hertford County	John Brickell/Baker	William Wynns/Lewis Brown	Thomas Brickell
Hyde County	William Russell/Abraham Jones	Robert Jennett	John Eborne
Johnston County	Thomas Gray	Arthur Bryan/Joseph Boon	Nathan Williams
Jones County	Nathan Bryan	Abner Nash (Note: Abner Nash was elected delegate to the Continental Congress on May 3, 1782. The seat in the House remained vacant.)	Unknown
Lincoln County	James Johnston	John Moore	John Sloan
Martin County	Kenneth McKenzie	William Slade	Samuel Williams
Mecklenburg County	Robert Irwin	Caleb Phifer	David Wilson
Montgomery County	Thomas Childs	Robert Moss	Peter Randle
Nash County	Hardy Griffin	Joseph Arrington	Edward Nicholson
Wilmington District		William Hooper	
New Hannover County	Caleb Grainger	Timothy Bloodworth	James Bloodworth
Northampton County	Samuel Lockhart	John Dawson	James Spikes
Hillsboro/Hillsborough District		Thomas Farmer	
Onslow County	Dr. Isaac Guion	Thomas Johnston	George Mitchell
Orange County	William Mebane	William McCauley	Mark Patterson
Pasquotank County	Edward Everagin	Joseph Jones	Thomas Reading
Perquimans County	Jesse Eason/John Whedbee	Jonathan Skinner	Richard Wedbee
Pitt County	John Williams/Edward Salter	James Gorham	John Simpson
Randolph County	John Collier	Jeduthan Harper	Edward Williams
Richmond County	Charles Medlock	Robert Webb	Thomas Crawford
Salisbury District		Dr. Anthony Newman	
Rowan County	Matthew Locke	William Sharpe	Samuel Young
Rutherford County	James Miller	William Gilbert	David Dickey
Sullivan County (became part of Tennessee)	Andrew Bledsoe	Isaac Shelby	Joseph Martin
Surry County	William Sheppard	Samuel Cummings	Trangott Bagge
Tyrrell County	Jeremiah Frazier	Nehemiah Norman	Nathan Hooker
Wake County	Joel Lane	James Hinton	Burwell Pope
Warren County	Nathaniel Macon	Joseph Hawkins	John Macon
Washington County (became part of Tennessee)	William Cocke	Joseph Hardin	Thomas Haughton
Wayne County	Andrew Bass	Burwell Mooring	Richard McKinnie
Wilkes County	Elijah Isaacs	Joseph Herndon	William Lenoir
Edenton District		Dr. Hugh Williamson (Note: Hugh Williamson was elected delegate to the Continental Congress on May 3, 1782. The seat in the House remained vacant.)	

== Legislation ==
This General Assembly met during the midst of the American Revolution. Many of the session laws that they passed dealt with the war. Other laws dealt with taxes, setting up judiciaries, chartering towns, and regulating rivers and forests.

== See also ==
- List of North Carolina state legislatures
