= North Carolina General Assembly of 1783 =

State legislature that convened in Hillsboro, North Carolina

7th North Carolina General Assembly (1783)
| ← | 1782 | April 1784 | → |

Overview
- Legislative body: North Carolina General Assembly
- Jurisdiction: North Carolina, United States
- Meeting place: Hillsborough
- Term: 1782

Senate
- Members: 50 Senators authorized
- Speaker: Richard Caswell, Sr.

House of Commons
- Members: 106 Representatives authorized
- Speaker: Edward Starkey

Sessions
- 1st: April 18, 1783 – May 17, 1783

The North Carolina General Assembly of 1783 was the state legislature that convened in Hillsboro, North Carolina from April 18, 1783, to May 17, 1783. Members of the North Carolina Senate and the North Carolina House of Commons were elected by eligible North Carolina voters. This was the last assembly to meet during the American Revolution. Much of their time was devoted to taking care of the North Carolina soldiers that fought in the war.

The General Assembly elected Alexander Martin of Guilford County as governor on April 26, 1782. James Glasgow was Secretary of State. James Iredell was Attorney General. There was no Lieutenant Governor of North Carolina until 1868.

== Councilors of State ==
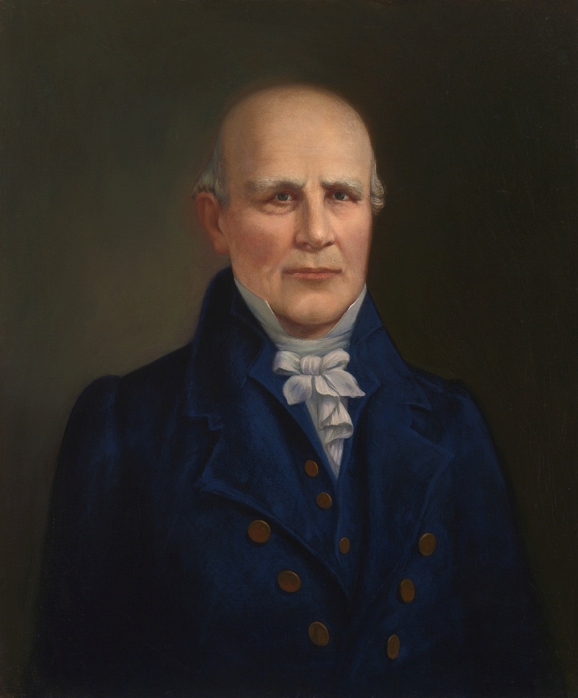
Councilor Nathaniel Macon

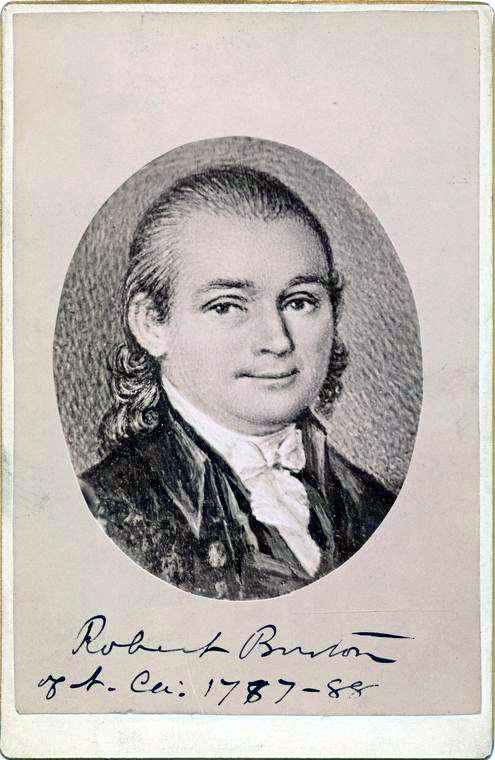
Councilor Robert Burton

The General Assembly elected the following Councilors of State on May 9, 1783:

- James Saunders from Caswell County
- Nathaniel Macon from Warren County Warren
- Spruce Macay from Rowan County
- Philemon Hawkins II from Warren County
- Thomas Polk from Mecklenburg County
- Robert Burton from Granville County
- Marquis de Bretigny from Craven County

== Members ==
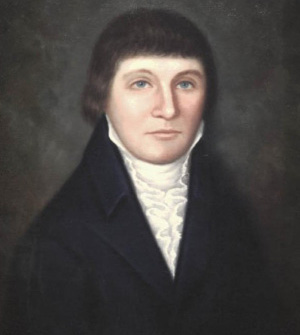
Sen. Richard Caswell, Dobbs County

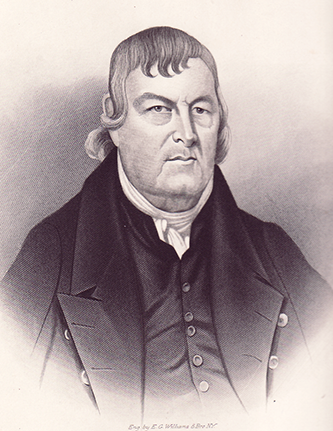
Hawkins Philemon Jr., Granville County

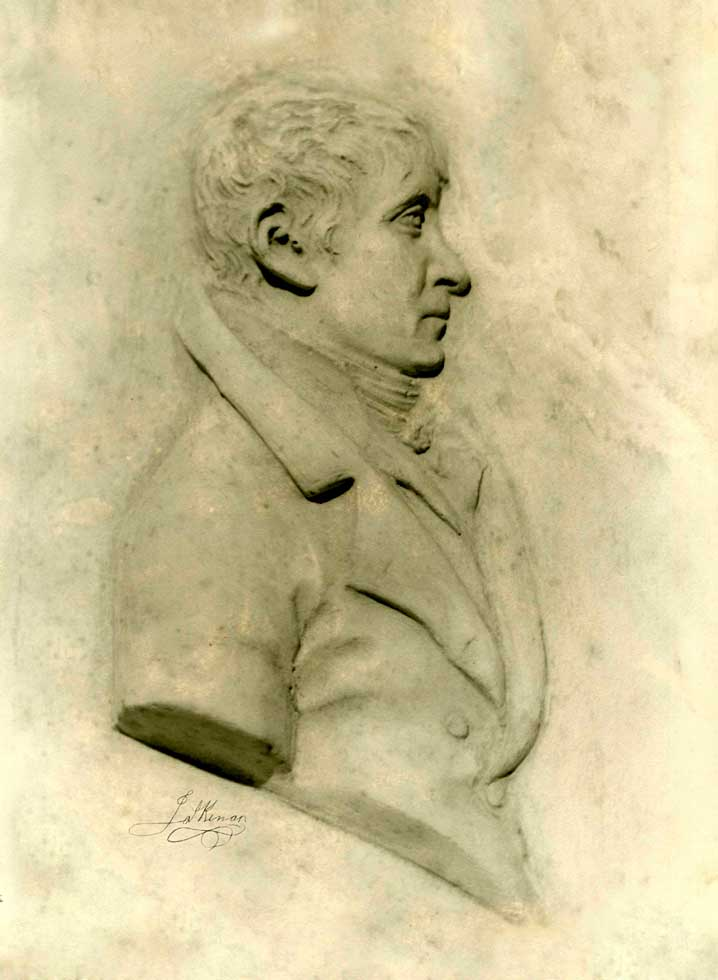
Sen. James Kenan, Duplin County

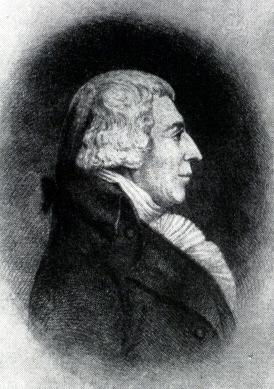
Rep. Richard Dobbs Spaight, New Bern

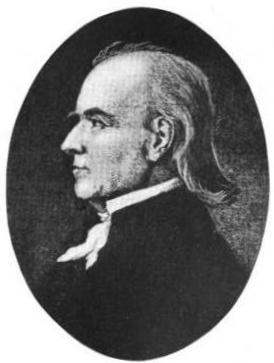
Rep. William Lenoir, Wilkes County

There was one senator and two members of the House of Commons for each of the 50 counties. In addition, each of the six districts had one representative each. The House of Commons leadership and staff included: Edward Starkey, Speaker; John Hunt, Clerk; and John Haywood, Assistant Clerk. The Senate leadership and staff included: Richard Caswell, speaker; John Haywood, clerk; and Sherwood Haywood, assistant clerk. Members of the House of Commons and Senate are listed below for each county and district.

| County/District | Senate Member | House Member | House Member |
|---|---|---|---|
| Anson County | Thomas Wade | John Jackson | John Jackson |
| Beaufort County | William Brown | Thomas Alderson | John Gray Blount |
| Bertie County | James Campbell | William Horn | David Turner |
| Bladen County | Thomas Brown | Samuel Cain | Francis Lucas |
| Brunswick County | Benjamin Smith | William Waters | Dennis Hawkins |
| Burke County | Charles McDowell | Waightstill Avery | Joseph McDowell |
| Camden County | Isaac Gregory | Dempsey Sawyer | Benjamin Jones |
| Carteret County | John Easton | Enoch Ward | Eli West |
| Caswell County | William Moore | David Shelton | Unknown |
| Chatham County | Ambrose Ramsey | Matthew Jones | Richard Kennon |
| New Bern District | | Richard Dobbs Spaight, Sr. (Note: Richard Dobbs Spaight was elected Delegate to the Continental Congress on April 25, 1783) | |
| Chowan County | Charles Johnson | Stephen Chambers | Richard Benbury |
| Craven County | James Coor | William Bryan | William Blount |
| Cumberland County | Ica Atkins | Edward Winslow | Patrick Travis |
| Currituck County | William Ferebee | Thomas Jarvis | Joseph Ferebee |
| Dobbs County | Richard Caswell, Sr. (Speaker) | Richard Caswell, Jr. | John Herritage |
| Duplin County | James Kenan | Richard Clinton | James Gillespie |
| Edgecombe County | Elisha Battle | Robert Diggs | James Wilson |
| Franklin County | Alexius M. Foster | Simon Jeffreys | Harrison Macon |
| Gates County | Jacob Hunter | Joseph Riddick | David Rice |
| Granville County | Robert Harris | Thomas Person | Philemon Hawkins, Jr. |
| Guilford County | Charles Bruce | James Galloway | John Leak |
| Halifax County | Benjamin McCulloch | John Whitaker | John Geddy |
| Halifax District | | Henry Montfort | |
| Hertford County | John Brickell | Lewis Brown | Thomas Brickell |
| Hyde County | William Russell | Benjamin Parmele | John Eborne |
| Johnston County | Hardy Bryan | Arthur Bryan | Nathan Williams |
| Jones County | Nathan Bryan | Frederick Hargett | William Randall |
| Lincoln County | Robet Alexander | Daniel McKissick | John Sloan |
| Martin County | Whitmell Hill | Samuel Smithwick | Samuel Williams |
| Mecklenburg County | Robert Irwin | Caleb Phifer | David Wilson |
| Montgomery County | Edward Moore | James McDonald | Mark Allen |
| Nash County | Hardy Griffin | Micajah Thomas | John Bonds |
| Wilmington District | | Archibald MacLaine | |
| New Hannover County | John A. Campbell | Timothy Bloodworth (Note: Timothy Bloodworth was ineligible for seat since he was already Treasurer for the Wilmington District.) | Thomas Bloodworth (Note: Thomas Bloodworth was ineligible since he was Marshal of the Court of Admiralty for the Port of Brunswick.) |
| Northampton County | Allen Jones | James Vaughan | Drury Gee |
| Hillsboro/Hillsborough District | | Thomas Farmer | |
| Onslow County | John Spicer | Edward Starkey (Speaker) | James Howard |
| Orange County | William McCauley | Alexander Mebane | Thomas Burke |
| Pasquotank County | Edward Everagin | William Lane | Thomas Reading |
| Perquimans County | Jesse Eaton | Jonathan Skinner | John Reed |
| Pitt County | John Williams | John Jordan | Richard Moye |
| Randolph County | Thomas Dougan | Jeduthan Harper | Robet McLean |
| Richmond County | Henry William Harrington | Robert Webb | John Childs |
| Salisbury District | | Dr. Anthony Newman | |
| Rowan County | Griffith Rutherford | Matthew Locke | George Henry Barrier |
| Rutherford County | James Holland | William Gilbert (Note: William Gilbert and Richard Singleton's seats were vacated on May 10, 1783. A new election was scheduled for September 15–16.) | Richard Singleton |
| Sullivan County (became part of Tennessee) | Joseph Martin | Abraham Bledsoe | William Cage |
| Surry County | Martin Armstrong | William T. Lewis | James Martin |
| Tyrrell County | Jeremiah Frazier | Nehemiah Norman | Nathan Hooker |
| Wake County | Joel Lane | Theophilus Hunter | Hardy Sanders |
| Warren County | Herbert Haynes | Joseph Hawkins | John Macon |
| Washington County (became part of Tennessee) | Unknown | Joseph Hardin | Thomas Haughton |
| Wayne County | Burwell Mooring | Needham Whitfield | Richard McKinnie |
| Wilkes County | Elijah Isaacs | Joseph Herndon | William Lenoir |
| Edenton District | | William Cumming | |

== Legislation ==
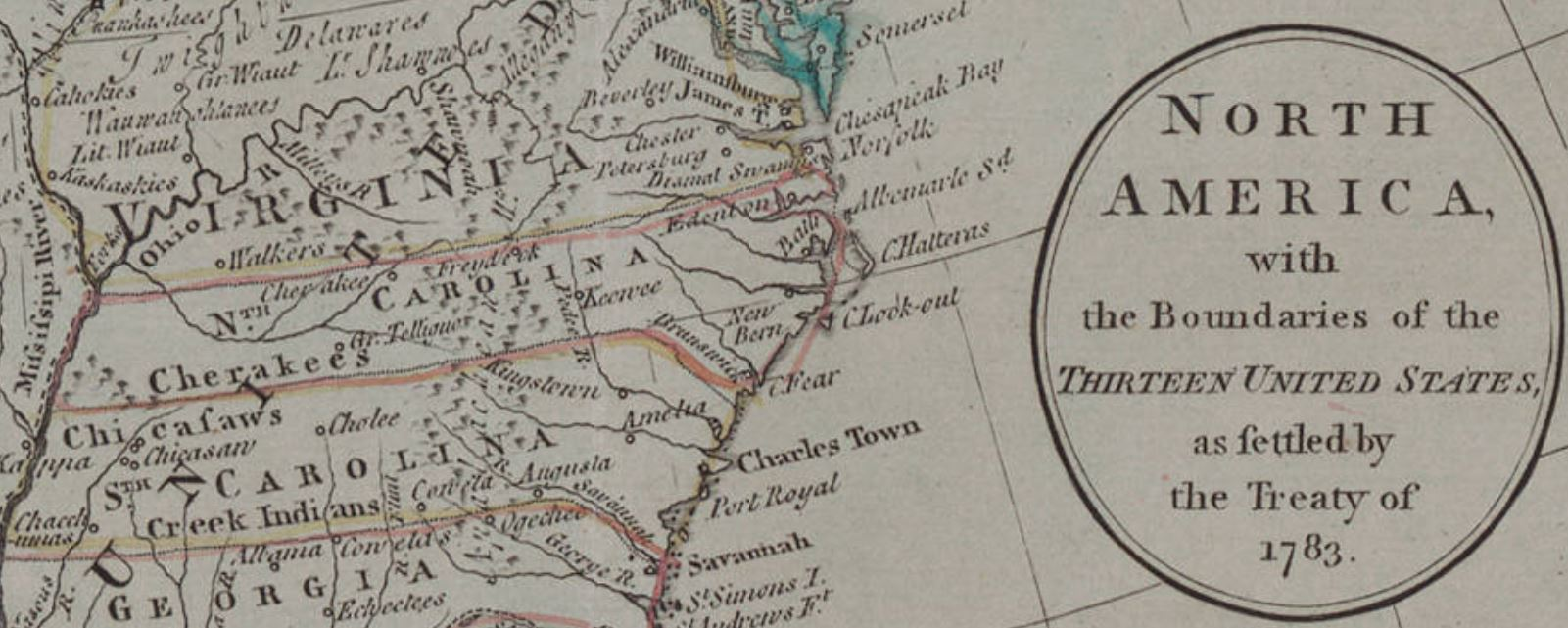
North Carolina in 1783

The American Revolution was ending, so much of the session was devoted to enacting legislation to compensate soldiers. There were also acts to name an agent for dealing with the Cherokees, dealing with slaves, monetary policy, and an act dealing with pardoning some loyalists (not David Fanning). The town of Fayetteville was authorized by the assembly. Martin Academy (later changed to Washington College) in Washington County was chartered by the assembly.

The territory of North Carolina extended to the Mississippi River in 1783. The General Assembly established Greene and Davidson Counties in the western region of North Carolina that eventually would become Tennessee in 1796.

== See also ==
- List of North Carolina state legislatures
