= North Carolina General Assembly of April 1784 =

Legislative term in US state of North Carolina

8th North Carolina General Assembly (April to June, 1784)
←	1783	1784 October to November	→

Overview
- Legislative body: North Carolina General Assembly
- Jurisdiction: North Carolina, United States
- Meeting place: New Bern
- Term: 1784

Senate
- Members: 55 Senators authorized
- Speaker: Richard Caswell, Sr.
- Clerk: John Haywood
- Assistant Clerk: Sherwood Haywood
- Doorkeeper: Malley
- Assistant Doorkeeper: Peter Goodin

House of Commons
- Members: 116 Delegates authorized (110 from counties, 6 districts)
- Speaker: Thomas Benbury
- Clerk: John Hunt

Sessions
- 1st: April 19, 1784 – June 3, 1784

The North Carolina General Assembly of April to June 1784 met in New Bern from April 19 to June 3, 1784. The assembly consisted of the 120 members of the North Carolina House of Commons and 50 senators of North Carolina Senate elected by the voters in April 1784. As prescribed by the 1776 Constitution of North Carolina, the General Assembly elected Alexander Martin to continue as Governor of North Carolina. In addition, the assembly elected members of the Council of State.

== Legislation ==
This General Assembly passed an act that changed the date of elections from April to the third Friday in August every year and changed the first meeting of the General Assembly to the first Monday in October. That is why there were two General Assemblies in 1783, one that started in April and one that started in October. It was difficult for legislatures to leave their farms and businesses in April to attend the assembly. It was more convenient for them to attend the assembly in the winter. The assembly also passed acts to raise taxes on imports, transfer land in the west to the federal government to pay for war debt, and take care of Revolutionary War veterans. For additional laws and minutes of the 1784 General Assembly, see Legislative Documents.

== Councilors of State ==
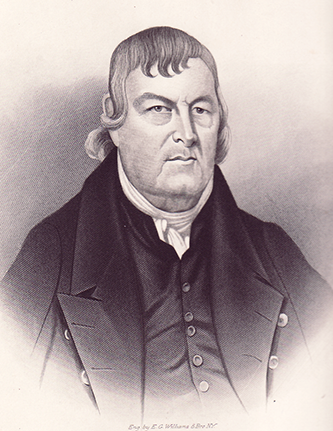
Hawkins Philemon, II

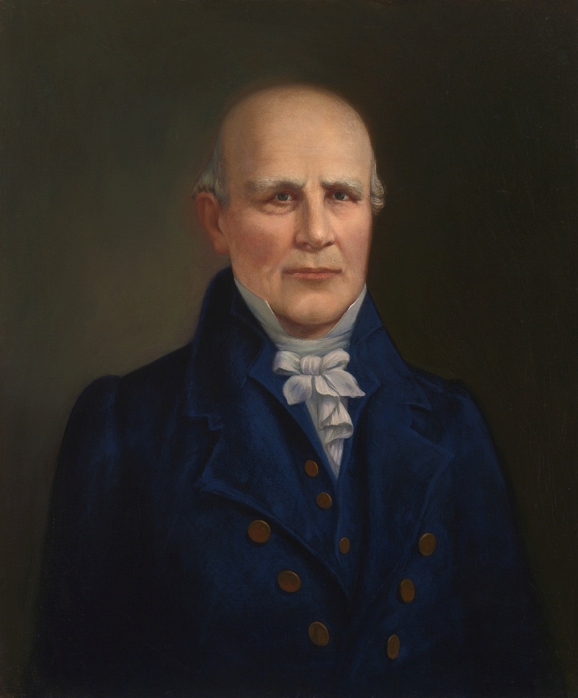
Nathaniel Macon

As prescribed by the 1776 Constitution of North Carolina, the General Assembly elected the governor and the following members of the North Carolina Council of State on May 8, 1784:

- Thomas Polk, Mecklenburg County (President)
- Pleasant Henderson, Granville County (Clerk)
- Robert Bignall, Edgecombe County
- Philemon Hawkins, Sr., Warren County
- Nathaniel Macon, Mecklenburg County
- James Saunders, Caswell County
- Thomas Eaton, Warren County (Note: Thomas Eaton was elected on May 11, 1784.)

James Glasgow continued to serve as North Carolina Secretary of State. Alfred Moore continued to serve as the North Carolina Attorney General.

== Assembly membership ==
There were 55 counties for this assembly. Each County was authorized two delegates to the House of Commons and one delegate to the Senate. In addition, there were six Districts, which were large towns. The Districts were authorized to elect one delegate each to the House of Commons. During the 1783 General Assembly, Davidson County and Greene County were created. These counties were represented in the House of Commons for the first time in the 1784 General Assembly. Sullivan, Washington, Davidson, and Green counties became part of Tennessee in 1796. Sampson and Moore Counties were also formed in 1784 and sent their first delegates to the General Assembly. For this assembly, Cumberland County had changed its name to Fayette County but changed the name back to Cumberland County for the next assembly in October.

In April 1784, this assembly voted "to give Congress the 29,000,000 acres (45,000 sq mi; 120,000 km^{2}) (Note: About 40 times the size of Rhode Island.) lying between the Allegheny Mountains" (as the entire Appalachian range was then called) "and the Mississippi River" to help offset its war debts. This area was a large part of what had been the Washington District (usually referred to simply as the Western Counties). These western counties had originally been acquired by lease from the Overhill Cherokee, out of which the Watauga Republic had arisen.

The North Carolina cession to the federal government had a stipulation that Congress would have to accept responsibility for the area within two years, which, for various reasons, it was reluctant to do. The cession effectively left the western settlements of North Carolina alone in dealing with the Cherokee of the area, many of whom had not yet made peace with the new nation. These developments were not welcomed by the frontiersmen, who had pushed even further westward, gaining a foothold on the western Cumberland River at Fort Nashborough (now Nashville), or the Overmountain Men, many of whom had settled in the area during the days of the old Watauga Republic. Inhabitants of the region feared that the cash-starved federal Congress might even be desperate enough to sell the frontier territory to a competing foreign power (such as France or Spain).

A few months later, a newly elected North Carolina General Assembly of October 1784 reevaluated the situation. Realizing the land could not at that time be used for its intended purpose of paying the debts of Congress and weighing the perceived economic loss of potential real estate opportunities, it rescinded the offer of cession and re-asserted its claim to the remote western district. The North Carolina lawmakers ordered judges to hold court in the western counties and arranged to enroll a brigade of soldiers for defense, appointing John Sevier to form it.

=== House of Commons members ===
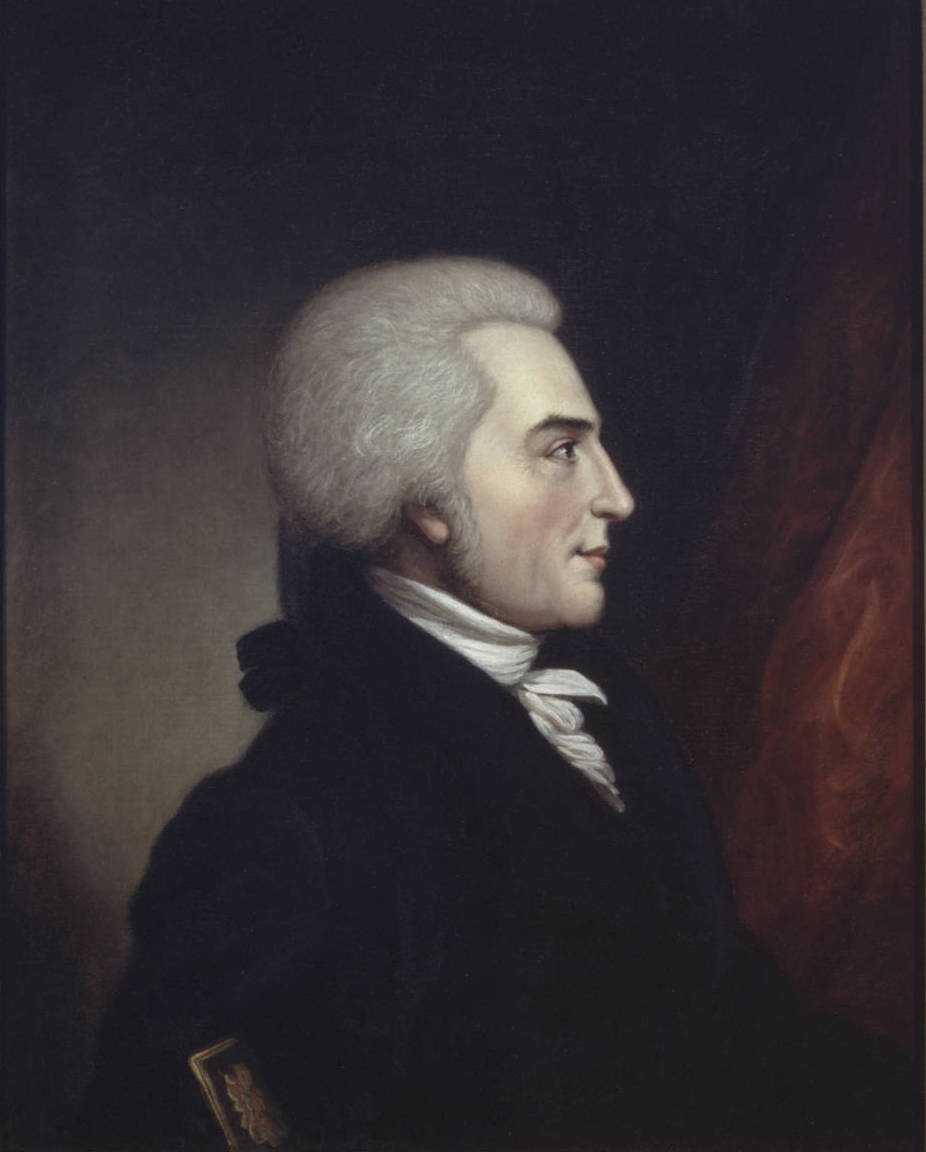
William Richardson Davie, Northampton County

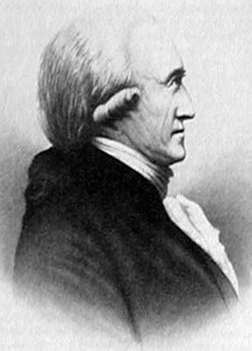
Benjamin Hawkins

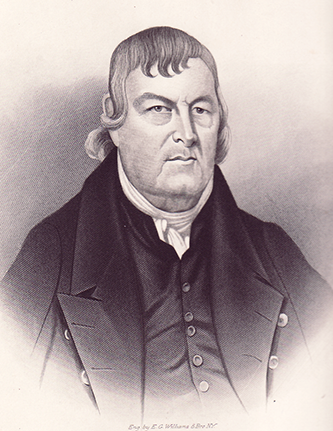
Philemon Hawkins, Jr., Granville County

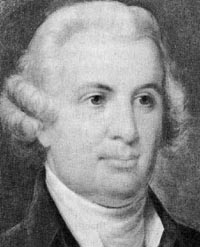
William Hooper, Orange County

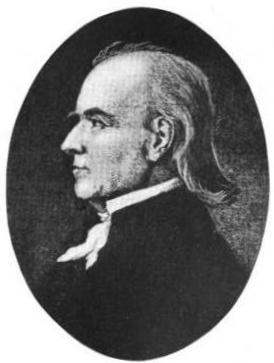
William Lenoir, Wilkes County

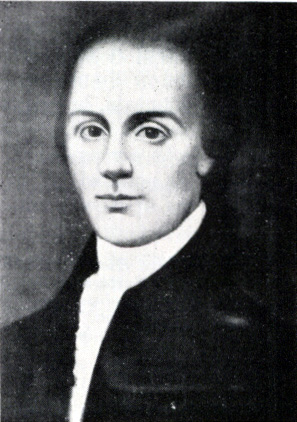
Abner Nash, Jones County

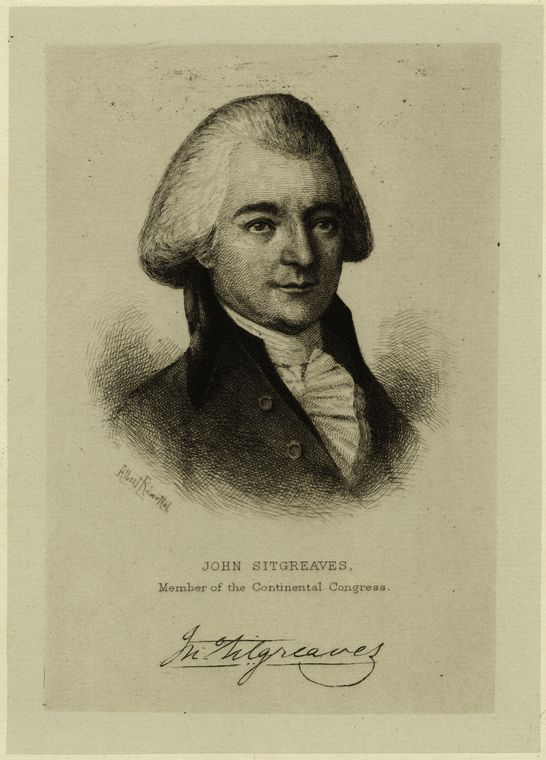
John Sitgreaves, New Bern

The House of Commons delegates elected a Speaker (Thomas Benbury), Clerk (John Hunt), Assistant Clerk, Doorkeeper, and Assistant Doorkeeper. The following delegates to the House of Commons were elected by the voters of North Carolina to represent each county and district:

County/District	Delegate
Anson	Jonathan Jackson
Anson	John Auld
Beaufort	Thomas Alderson
Beaufort	John Gray Blount
Bertie	Zedekiah Stone
Bertie	Andrew Oliver
Bladen	Samuel Cain
Bladen	Francis Lucas
Brunswick	Jacob Leonard
Brunswick	David Flowers
Burke	Joseph McDowell
Burke	Waightstill Avery
Camden	Benjamin Jones
Camden	Enoch Sawyer
Carteret	Vacant
Carteret	Eli West
Caswell	David Shelton
Caswell	John Atkinson
Chatham	William Clark
Chatham	Vacant
Chowan	Michael Payne
Chowan	Thomas Benbury
Craven	William Bryan
Craven	William Blount (Note: William Blount was a delegate to the Continental Congress/Confederation Congress in 1782–1783; 1786–1787. He signed the Declaration of Independence.)
Cumberland	Edward Winslow
Cumberland	James Emmett
Currituck	Joseph Ferebee
Currituck	Dr. James White (Note: James White was a delegate to the Continental Congress/Confederation Congress, 1786–1788. He was also a non-voting member of the U.S. Congress from the Southwest Territory in 1794.)
Currituck	John Humphries
Davidson	Elijah Robertson
Davidson	Ephraim McLean
Dobbs	John Herritage
Dobbs	John Sheppard
Duplin	James Gillespie
Duplin	Thomas Gray
Edgecombe	Isaac Sessums
Edgecombe	John Dalvin (Dolvin)
Fayette	William Rand
Fayette	Alexander McAllister
Franklin	Thomas Sherrod
Franklin	Richard Ransom
Gates	Joseph Riddick
Gates	Seth Riddick
Granville	Thomas Person
Granville	Philemon Hawkins, Jr.
Greene	Alexander Outlaw
Greene	Joshua Gist
Guilford	James Galloway
Guilford	Ralph Gorrell
Halifax	Benjamin McCulloch
Halifax	Nicholas Long
Hertford	William Hill
Hertford	Thomas Brickell
Hyde	John Eborne
Hyde	William Russell
Johnston	Arthur Bryan
Johnston	Samuel Smith
Jones	William Randall
Jones	Abner Nash (Note: Abner Nash was a delegate to the Continental Congress/Confederation Congress, 1782–1783. He was also the 2nd Governor of the state (1780–1781))
Lincoln	John Sloan
Lincoln	Daniel McKissick
Martin	Nathan Mayo
Martin	Samuel Smithwick
Mecklenburg	Caleb Phifer
Mecklenburg	David Wilson
Montgomery	James McDonald
Montgomery	William Kendall
Moore	John Cox
Moore	William Seals
Nash	Micajah Thomas
Nash	John Bonds
New Hanover	Timothy Bloodworth (Note: Timothy Bloodworth was a delegate to the Continental Congress/Confederation Congress in 1786.)
New Hanover	John Moore
Northampton	Howell Edmunds
Northampton	William Richardson Davie (Note: William Richardson Davie was the 10th state Governor (1798–1799).)
Onslow	Edward Starkey
Onslow	Daniel Yates
Orange	William Hooper (Note: William Hooper was a delegate to the 1st Continental Congress in 1774 and the 2nd Continental Congress in 1775–1777. He signed the Declaration of Independence.)
Orange	John Butler
Pasquotank	Thomas Harvey
Pasquotank	Dempsey Conner
Perquimans	Jonathan Skinner
Perquimans	Robert Riddick
Pitt	John Jordan
Pitt	Richard Moye
Randolph	Joseph Robbins
Randolph	Aaron Hill
Richmond	John Speed
Richmond	William Pickett
Rowan	Matthew Locke
Rowan	George Henry Barrier/Berger/Barringer
Rutherford	Richard Singleton
Rutherford	James Withrow
Sampson	David Dodd
Sampson	John Hay
Sullivan	William Cage
Sullivan	David Looney
Surry	William T. Lewis
Surry	James Martin
Tyrrell	Benjamin Spruill
Tyrrell	Everard Stubbs
Wake	Nathaniel Jones
Wake	James Hinton
Warren	Benjamin Hawkins (Note: Benjamin Hawkins was a delegate to the Continental Congress/Confederation Congress in 1781–1783 and 1787.)
Warren	James Payne
Washington	Charles Robertson
Washington	Landon Carter
Wayne	William Alford
Wayne	Benjamin Sherrod
Wilkes	William Lenoir
Wilkes	Jesse Franklin
Town of Edenton	William Cumming (Note: William Cumming was a delegate to the Continental Congress/Confederation Congress in 1785.)
Town of Halifax	Henry Montfort
Town of Hillsborough	Archibald Lytle
Town of New Bern	John Sitgreaves (Note: John Sitgreaves was a delegate to Continental Congress/Confederation Congress in 1785.)
Town of Salisbury	Thomas Frohock
Town of Wilmington	Archibald MacLaine

=== Senate members ===
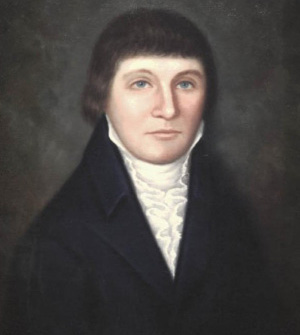
Sen. Richard Caswell, Dobbs County

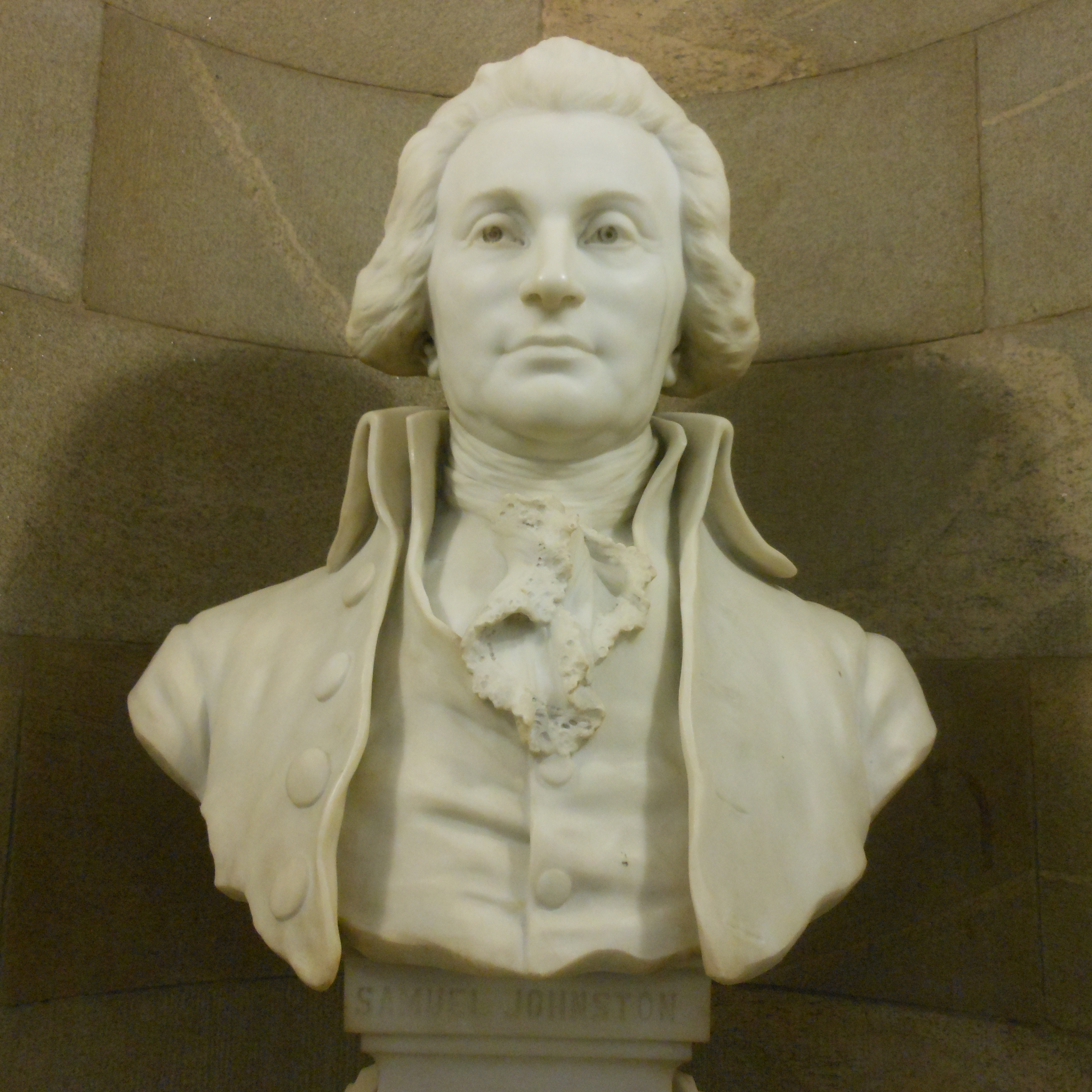
Sen. Samuel Johnston, Chowan County

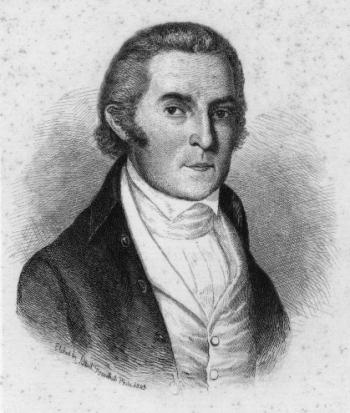
Sen. Willie Jones, Halifax County

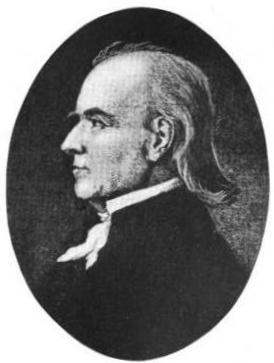
Sen. William Lenoir

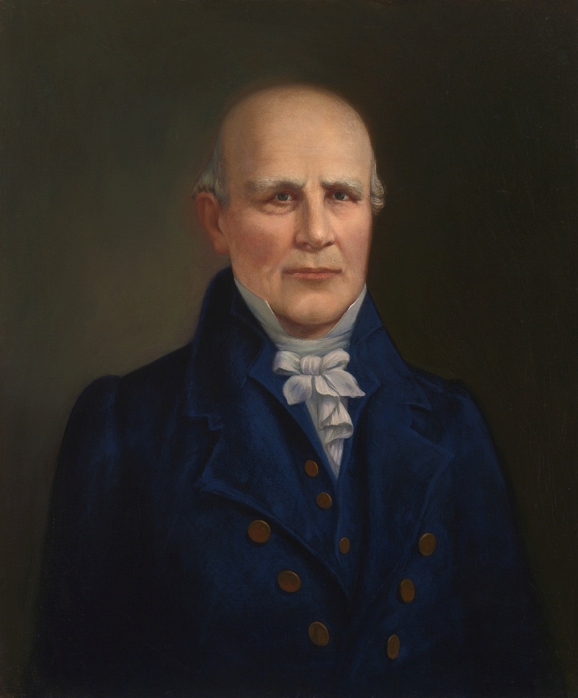
Sen. Nathaniel Macon, Warren County

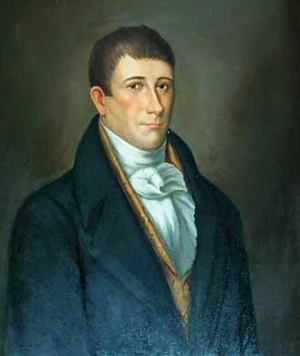
Sen. Benjamin Williams, Johnston County

The Senators elected a President (Richard Caswell), Clerk (John Haywood), Assistant Clerk, Doorkeeper, and Assistant Doorkeeper. Five counties that were authorized Senators did not send a representative. The following Senators were elected by the voters of North Carolina to represent each county: (Note: The President of the Senate is also referred to as the Speaker. John Haywood may have also served as assistant clerk of the House of Commons.)

County	Senator
Anson	Thomas Wade
Beaufort	John Smaw
Bertie	John Johnston
Bladen	Thomas Brown
Brunswick	Alfred Moore
Burke	Charles McDowell (Note: Charles McDowell was a Brigadier General in the North Carolina militia during the American Revolution.)
Camden	Isaac Gregory (Note: Isaac Gregory was a Brigadier General in the North Carolina militia during the American Revolution.)
Carteret	Enoch Ward
Caswell	William Moore
Chatham	Ambrose Ramsey (Note: Ambrose Ramsey was a Brigadier General pro tempore in the North Carolina militia during the American Revolution.)
Chowan	Samuel Johnston (Note: Samuel Johnston was a delegate to the 2nd Continental Congress, 1780–1781. He was also the state Governor (1787–1789).)
Craven	James Coor
Cumberland	David Smith
Currituck	James Phillips
Davidson	Vacant
Dobbs	Richard Caswell, Sr. (Note: Richard Caswell was a delegate to the 1st and 2nd Continental Congress, 1774, 1775 and signed the Declaration of Independence. He was also the 1st and 5th state Governor (1776–1780, 1785–1787).)
Duplin	Robert Clinton
Edgecombe	Elisha Battle
Fayette	Thomas Armstrong
Franklin	Vacant
Gates	Jacob Hunter
Granville	Robert Harris
Greene	Vacant
Guilford	Vacant
Halifax	Willie Jones (Note: Willie Jones was a delegate to the 2nd Continental Congress in 1780.)
Hertford	Hardy Murfree
Hyde	Abraham Jones
Johnston	Benjamin Williams (Note: Benjamin Williams was twice Governor of North Carolina (1799–1802, 1807–1808).)
Jones	Frederick Hargett
Lincoln	Robert Alexander
Martin	Whitmell Hill (Note: Whitmell Hill was a delegate to the Continental Congress, 1778–1780)
Mecklenburg	Robert Irwin
Montgomery	Charles Robertson
Moore	Henry Lightfoot
Nash	Hardy Griffin
New Hanover	Caleb Grainger
Northampton	Samuel Lockhart
Onslow	Thomas Johnston
Orange	William McCauley
Pasquotank	Edward Everagin
Perquimans	John Skinner
Pitt	John Williams (Note: John Williams was a delegate to the 2nd Continental Congress (1778–1779) and signer of the Articles of Confederation.)
Randolph	Thomas Dougan
Richmond	Charles Medlock
Rowan	Griffith Rutherford (Note: Griffith Rutherford was a Brigadier General in the North Carolina militia during the American Revolution.)
Rutherford	James Miller
Sampson	Richard Clinton
Sullivan	Vacant
Surry	John Armstrong
Tyrrell	John Warrington
Wake	Joel Lane
Warren	Nathaniel Macon (Note: Nathaniel Macon represented North Carolina in both houses of Congress. He was the fifth Speaker of the House, serving from 1801 to 1807. He was a member of the United States House of Representatives from 1791 to 1815 and a member of the United States Senate from 1815 to 1828.)
Washington	William Cocke
Wayne	Burwell Mooring
Wilkes	William Lenoir (Note: William Lenoir served in the North Carolina militia during the American Revolution. After the war, he attained the rank of Major General in the North Carolina militia.)

== See also ==
- List of North Carolina state legislatures
