= North Carolina General Assembly of 1780–1781 =

Three sessions of the general assembly of North Carolina held in 1780-1781

4th North Carolina General Assembly (1780-1781)
←	1779	1781	→

Overview
- Legislative body: North Carolina General Assembly
- Jurisdiction: North Carolina, United States
- Meeting place: 1st New Bern, 2nd New Bern, 3rd Halifax
- Term: 1780–1781

Senate
- Members: 50 Senators (50 counties, including Washington District/County)
- Speaker: Alexander Martin
- Clerk: John Haywood

House of Commons
- Members: 106 Representatives authorized (50 counties with 2 each, 6 districts with 1 each)
- Speaker: Thomas Benbury
- Clerk: John Hunt

Sessions
- 1st: April 17, 1780 – Unknown date in 1780
- 2nd: September 5, 1780 – Unknown date in 1780
- 3rd: January 27, 1781 – February 13, 1781

The North Carolina General Assembly of 1780-1781 was the fourth elected legislative body of the State of North Carolina. The assembly consisted of a Senate and House of Commons that met in three sessions in at least two locations in the years 1780 and 1781. Each of the existing 50 North Carolina counties were authorized to elect one Senator and two members of the House of Commons. In addition, six districts (also called boroughs) also elected one House member each. (Note: Not all counties sent two representatives. Some sent none or one.) The first two sessions were probably held in New Bern, North Carolina in April and September 1780. The third session met in Halifax from January 27, 1781 – February 13, 1781. (Note: The journal for the first two sessions have been lost, so the locations or dates cannot be confirmed.)

== Governor and Councilors of State ==
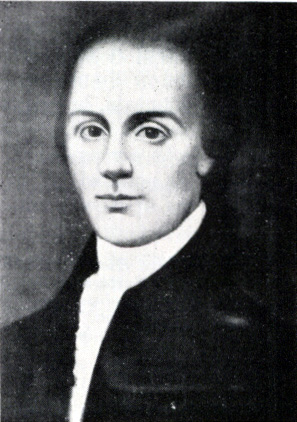
Sen./Gov. Abner Nash

In 1780, the General Assembly elected Abner Nash as Governor of North Carolina, as was called for in the Constitution of North Carolina. His term of office was extended by an act of the assembly until June 25, 1781.

The North Carolina Constitution of 1776 required "that the Senate and House of Commons, jointly, at their first meeting after each annual election, shall by ballot elect seven persons to be a Council of State for one year, who shall advise the Governor in the execution of his office."

The known North Carolina Council of State members elected by the General Assembly in 1780 included:

- Joseph Leech from Craven County
- James Davis
- Isaac Guion from Craven County
- James Granger

== Leadership ==
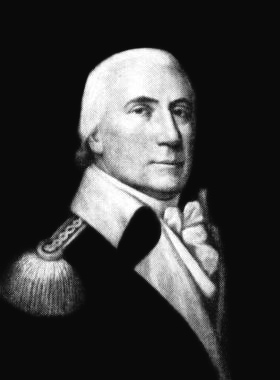
Sen. Alexander Martin

The House of Commons leadership included the following persons:

- Speaker: Thomas Benbury (Chowan County)
- Clerk: John Hunt

The Senate leadership included the following:

- Speaker: Alexander Martin (Guilford County)
- Clerk: John Haywood (Edgecombe County)
- Assistant Clerk: Sherwood Haywood (Edgecombe County)

== House and Senate members ==
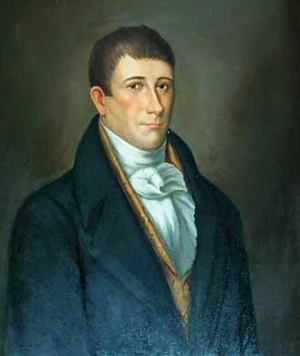
Sen. Benjamin Williams

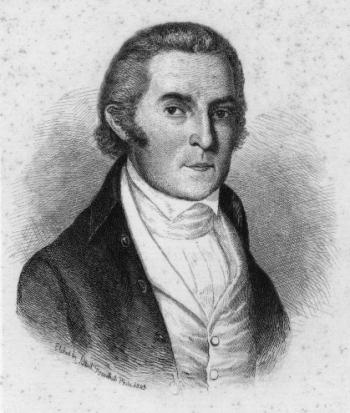
Rep Willie Jones

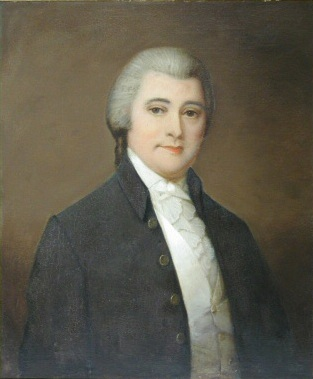
Rep. William Blount

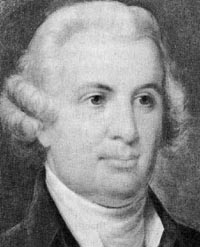
Rep. William Hooper

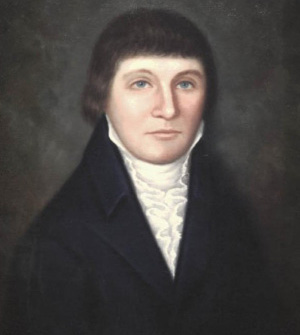
Sen. Richard Caswell

New counties created in 1779 included Franklin County, Gates County, Lincoln County, Montgomery County, Randolph County, Richmond County, Rutherford County, Warren County, and Wayne County. Bute County and Tryon County were abolished in 1779. There were no new counties created in 1780 or 1781. There was at least a Senator or one Representative from each county and district.

Members of the General Assembly were allowed 55 dollars per day for attendance at sessions.

County	House of Commons Member	Senate Member
Anson County	Miller, Stephen	Childs, John
Anson County	Farr, Richard	-
Beaufort County	Brown, William	Respess, Thomas, Jr.
Beaufort County	Willis, Samuel	-
Bertie County	Turner, David	Horne, William
Bertie County	Jaycocks, Jonathan	-
Bladen County	Cain, Samuel	Vacant
Bladen County	Lucas, Frances	-
Brunswick County	none	MacLaine, Archibald
Brunswick County	none	-
Burke County	Brevard, Hugh	McLean, Ephraim
Burke County	McDowell, Joseph	-
Camden County	Burgess, William	Grays, John
Camden County	Gregory, Isaac	-
Carteret County	Shepard, Solomon	Unknown
Carteret County	Unknown or vacant	-
Caswell County	Farrow, Peter	Unknown
Caswell County	Williams, John	-
Caswell County	Moore, Stephen	-
Chatham County	Scurlock, Mial	Ramsey, Ambrose
Chatham County	Williams, James	-
Chowan County	Benbury, Thomas	Johnson, Charles
Chowan County	Boyd, William	-
Craven County	Bryan, William	Coor, James
Craven County	Blount, William	-
Cumberland County	Cochran, Robet	Folsome, Ebenezer
Cumberland County	Winslow, Edward	-
Currituck County	Phillips, James	Jarvis, Samuel
Currituck County	Humphreys, John	-
Dobbs County	Caswell, William	Caswell, Richard, Sr. (Note: He served in the Continental Congress.)
Dobbs County	Sheppard, Abraham	-
Duplin County	Dickson, Joseph	Clinton, Richard
Duplin County	Gillespie, James	-
Edgecombe County	Gray, Etheldred	Battle, Elisha
Edgecombe County	Horn, Henry, Jr.	-
Franklin County	Bryant, Joseph	Hill, Henry
Franklin County	Brickell, William	-
Gates County	Sumner, Jethro	Gregory, James
Gates County	Garrett, James	-
Granville County	Person, Thomas	Hunt, Memucan
Granville County	Hawkins, Philemon, Jr.	-
Guilford County	Hunter, James	Martin, Alexander
Guilford County	Gowdy, William	-
Halifax County	Jones, Willie	Davis, Oroondates
Halifax County	Weldon, William/Whitaker, John	-
Hertford County	Baker, John	Unknown
Hertford County	Jordan, Pleasant/Mauney, James	-
Hyde County	Latham, Rotheas	Russell, William
Hyde County	Barrow, George	-
Johnston County	Lockhart, James	Williams, Benjamin
Johnston County	Whitley, John	-
Jones County	Hargett, Frederick	Nash, Abner/Vacant (Note: Abner Nash was elected governor on April 20, 1780.)
Jones County	Isler, John	-
Lincoln County	Mauney, Valentine	Johnston, James
Lincoln County	Sloan, John	-
Martin County	Smithwick, Edward	McKenzie, Kenneth
Martin County	Averitt, John	-
Mecklenburg County	Phifer, Caleb	Irwin, Robert
Mecklenburg County	Wilson, David	-
Montgomery County	Roper, James	Ledbetter, Drury
Montgomery County	Moore, Edward	-
New Hanover County	Campbell, John A.	DeVane, John
New Hanover County	Bloodworth, Timothy/Bloodworth, James	-
Northampton County	Vaughan, James/Dawson, John	Unknown
Northampton County	Peoples, Robert	-
Onslow County	Starkey, Edward	Rhodes, Henry
Onslow County	Mitchell, George	-
Orange County	McCauley, William	Courtney, William
Orange County	Patterson, Mark	-
Pasquotank County	Blackstock, John	Everagin, Edward
Pasquotank County	Harvey, Thomas	-
Perquimans County	Blount, Charles	Eaton, Jesse
Perquimans County	Harvey, John (Note: John Harvey's Wikipedia biography states that he died in 1775, which is verified on NCPedia. Not sure who the John Harvey was in 1780.)	-
Pitt County	George	Simpson, John
Pitt County	Williams, John	-
Randolph County	Balfour, Andrew	Collier, John
Randolph County	Harper, Jeduthan	-
Richmond County	Harrington, Henry William	Medlock, Charles
Richmond County	Webb, Robert	-
Rowan County	Locke, Matthew	Rutherford, Griffith
Rowan County	Barrier, George Henry (aka George H. Berger)	-
Rutherford County	Whitesides, David/Porter, William (Note: David Whitesides died while in office. William Porter was elected to replace him.)	Unknown
Rutherford County	Gilbert, William	-
Sullivan County	Looney, David	Shelby, Evan
Sullivan County	Unknown/Vacant	-
Surry County	Cummings, Samuel	Shepherd, William
Surry County	Freeman, Samuel	-
Tyrrell County	Warrington, John	Frazier, Jeremiah
Tyrrell County	Blunt, Edmund	-
Wake County	Jones, Nathanial	Hinton, John, Jr.
Wake County	Humphries, John	-
Warren County	Macon, John	Haynes, Herbert
Warren County	Hawkins, Joseph	-
Washington County (became Tennessee in 1789)	Allison, Charles	Carter, John
Washington County (became Tennessee in 1789)	Robertson, Charles/Clarke, Henry	-
Wayne County	Cobb, Stephen	Unknown
Wayne County	Mooring, Burwell	-
Wilkes County	Isaacs, Elijah	Cleveland, Benjamin
Wilkes County	Herndon, Joseph	-
Edenton District	Smith, Robert	-
Halifax District	Montfort, Henry	-
Hillsborough District	Tullock, Thomas/Shields, John	-
New Bern District	Green, James, Jr./Blount, William (Note: John Green, Jr. was elected to the Council of State and had to give up his seat. William Blount was elected to replace him.)	-
Salisbury District	Newman, Anthony	-
Wilmington District	Hooper, William	-

== See also ==
- List of North Carolina state legislatures
