= Joseph Riddick =

American politician

Personal details
- Born: 1735 Perquimans County, North Carolina
- Died: November 18, 1818 (aged 82–83) Gates County, North Carolina
- Spouse: Ann
- Children: sons Reuben, Isaiah, and Arthur; daughters Hannah Rogerson, Easter Billups, Avis Eason, and Mabel Hill

Member of the North Carolina House of Representatives from the Gates County district
- In office 1781–1784

Member of the North Carolina Senate from the Gates County district
- In office 1785–1811

Member of the North Carolina Senate
- In office 1815–1817

Joseph Riddick (1735 – November 18, 1818) was a North Carolina politician who served as Speaker of the North Carolina Senate for 11 years from 1800 to 1804 and from 1806 to 1811. Only Bartlett Yancey and Marc Basnight have led the state Senate for a longer span of time. Riddick was also a veteran of the American Revolutionary War. He attained the rank of General in the NC Militia.

== Early life ==
Joseph was born in about 1735, probably in that portion of Perquimans County, North Carolina that became Gates County in 1779. His parents were Captain Joseph Riddick (1689–1759) and Hannah (Hunter) Riddick (about 1712–1791). His mother was the daughter of Isaac and Elizabeth Hunter. Joseph Married Ann Stallings (?–1824), who was the daughter of Simon Stallings.

Professor and historian Isaac Samauel Harrell writes the following

Although no returns can be obtained further back than 1842, the county was in all probability anti-Federalist in the early days, for Joseph Riddick, who was in the assembly for 33 years, voted with the anti-Federalists. He never wanted to spend any money. The county was opposed to internal improvements and to the Literary Fund.

== Political career ==
Joseph Riddick was the leading man in the county from the close of the Revolutionary War to his death. He was in the Assembly from 1781 to 1811 and again in 1815 and 1817. For eleven years he was the speaker of the Senate; was a representative from Gates County to the Hillsborough Convention of 1788 that debated the Constitution of the United States. During its sessions he made himself distinguished on account of his common sense. He bitterly opposed the ratification by the state of the Virginia and Kentucky Resolutions and their defeat is largely due to him. He was also a member of the convention of 1835 for a new constitution for the state. In 1798 Governor Samuel Johnston wrote to Supreme Court Justice James Iredell,

"There are some men of very good understanding in both houses. Riddick, from Gates, has more influence in the Senate; he seems generally disposed to do what is right, but will go about it in his own way."

He made his trips to Raleigh in a stick-gig and never missed a session. At his old home is a grape-vine that he brought from Raleigh when he was a member of the Assembly.

He represented Gates County, North Carolina in the North Carolina General Assembly over a period of 35 years, including service in the North Carolina House of Commons (1781–1785) and in the North Carolina Senate (1785–1811, 1815, 1817). He ran unsuccessfully for the United States House of Representatives as a Democratic-Republican in 1810 and 1813 (and also got a handful of votes, likely unsolicited, in 1815).

- North Carolina House of Commons (five consecutive terms)
  - North Carolina General Assembly of 1781
  - North Carolina General Assembly of 1782
  - North Carolina General Assembly of 1783
  - North Carolina General Assembly of April 1784
  - North Carolina General Assembly of October 1784
- North Carolina Senate (27 consecutive terms)
  - North Carolina General Assembly of 1785, 1786, 1787, 1788, 1789, 1790, 1791-1792, 1792-1793, 1793-1794, 1794-1795, 1795, 1796, 1797, 1798, 1799, 1800, 1801, 1802, 1803, 1804, 1805, 1806, 1807, 1808, 1809, 1811
  - 1815, 1817 (two consecutive terms)

He was a Presidential elector for the state of North Carolina on 2 occasions—1809-Madison, 1817-Monroe.

== Patriotic Service ==
Joseph was a member of the Chowan County Committee of Safety in 1776. (Note: The NCPEDIA biography says that he fought in the American Revolution and that he was referred to as General after the war. No references to substantiate this have been found.)

== Commissioner ==
The following court record is stating that he was to be a commissioner to establish the county boundary line between Gates & Perquimans.

- An Act to appoint commissioners to lay off and establish the dividing line between the counties of Perquimans and Gates
- Whereas, the dividing line between the counties of Perquimans and Gates have not heretofore been sufficiently described, either by actual surveys, or by known and fixed boundaries, whereby it becomes expedient in order to prevent disputes between the inhabitants of said counties, that the said dividing line should be more accurately ascertained and laid off.
- Be it enacted by the General Assembly of the State of North Carolina, and it is hereby enacted by the authority of the same, That Willis Riddick and Langley Billups, of the county of Perquimans, and Joseph Gordon and Joseph Riddick of the county of Gates, be, and they are hereby appointed commissioners with full power and authority to lay off, extend and mark the line between the said counties, due regard being had to the former reputed line.
- And be it further enacted, That the said Commissioners shall appoint such surveyor, chain carrier and other attendance as shall be necessary for the marking, extending and establishing the said line, and shall make or cause to be made a return of their proceedings to each of the Courts of Pleas and Quarter Sessions of the said counties, to be deposited and kept among the records thereof, and the said lines when so extended, and laid off, shall forever thereafter be established, and confirmed as the dividing line between the said counties.
- And be it further enacted, That the said commissioners, surveyors, chain carriers and attendants, shall receive such compensation for their services as the Courts of Pleas and Quarter Sessions of the said counties shall deem just, to be paid out of the monies levied and collected for the said counties.

== Death ==
Joseph died September 1818. In his will, dated July 24, 1818, he mentions his wife Ann; sons Reuben, Isaiah, and Arthur; daughters Hannah Rogerson, Easter Billups, Avis Eason, and Mabel Hill; and grandsons Josiah, Kedar, and Nathan Riddick, Mills Hill, Langley Billups, Solomon Eason, and Jesse Rogerson.

Preceded by Benjamin Smith	Speaker of the North Carolina Senate; 1800–1804	Succeeded by Alexander Martin
Preceded by Alexander Martin	Speaker of the North Carolina Senate; 1806–1811	Succeeded by George Outlaw
