= North Carolina General Assembly of 1785 =

Legislative term in US state of North Carolina

10th North Carolina General Assembly (1785)
←	Oct 1784	1786	→

Overview
- Legislative body: North Carolina General Assembly
- Jurisdiction: North Carolina, United States
- Meeting place: New Bern
- Term: 1785

Senate
- Members: 54 Senators
- Speaker: Alexander Martin
- Clerk: John Haywood
- Assistant Clerk: Sherwood Haywood
- Doorkeeper: William Murphy
- Assistant Doorkeeper: Nicholas Murphy

House of Commons
- Members: 114 Delegates Authorized
- Speaker: Richard Dobbs Spaight
- Clerk: John Hunt
- Assistant Clerk: John Haywood
- Doorkeeper: Peter Gooding
- Assistant Doorkeeper: James Malloy

Sessions
- 1st: November 19, 1785 – December 29, 1785

The North Carolina General Assembly of 1785 met in New Bern from November 18, 1785, to December 29, 1785. The assembly consisted of the 114 members of the North Carolina House of Commons and 54 senators of North Carolina Senate elected by the voters on August 19, 1785. During the 1785 session, the legislature created Rockingham County. As prescribed by the 1776 Constitution of North Carolina the General Assembly elected Richard Caswell to continue as Governor of North Carolina and members of the Council of State.

== Councilors of State ==
As prescribed by the 1776 Constitution of North Carolina, the General Assembly elected Richard Caswell as governor on December 9, 1785, and the following members of the North Carolina Council of State:

- Joseph Leech, Craven County, President, elected on December 10, 1785,
- James Gillespie, Duplin County, elected on December 10, 1785
- Winston Caswell, Dobbs County, Clerk (Note: Winston Caswell was the son of Richard Caswell.)
- John Hawks, Craven County, elected on December 10, 1785
- William McClure, Craven County, elected on December 10, 1785
- John Spicer, Onslow County, elected on December 10, 1785
- Green Hill, Franklin County, elected on December 12, 1785
- Miles King, Richmond County, elected on December 28, 1785

James Glasgow continued as North Carolina Secretary of State.

== Assembly membership ==
=== House of Commons members ===
William Polk, Davidson County

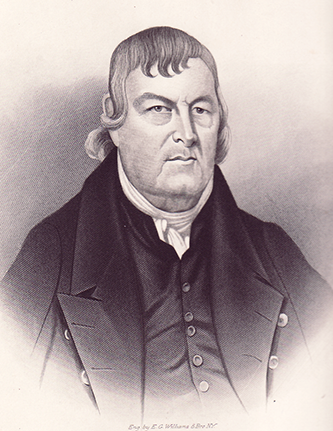
Philemon Hawkins, Jr., Granville County

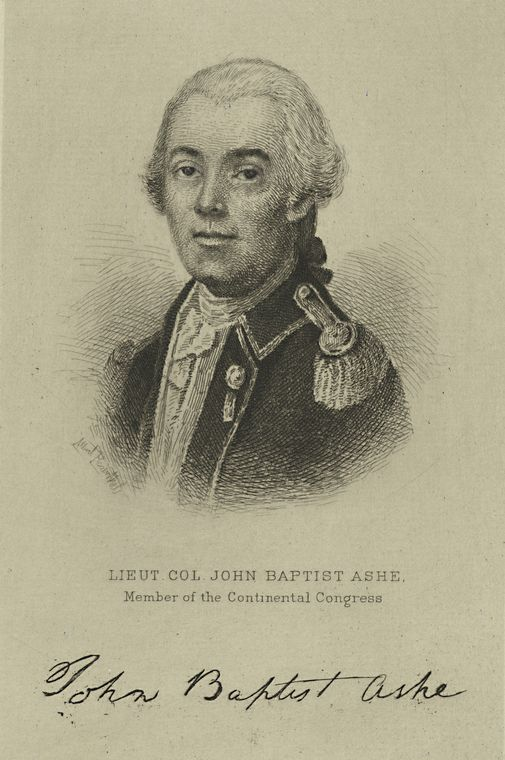
John Baptista Ashe, Halifax County

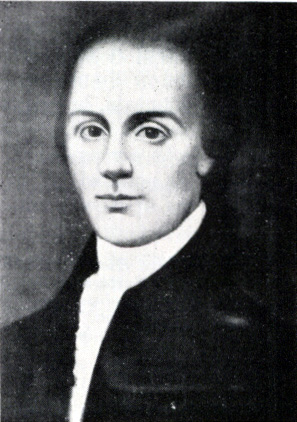
Abner Nash, Jones County

There were 114 positions authorized for the House of Commons in this assembly, including one representative from each of six districts and 54 counties. Only 105 delegates are known to have attended this House of Commons assembly.

Fayette County, which was formed in July 1784 from the eastern part of Cumberland County, reverted to Cumberland County three months later, so does not appear in this assembly.

Greene, Sullivan and Washington Counties had formed the State of Franklin in an attempt to create a new state. They did not send representatives to this assembly.

Anson, Bladen, and Gates County only sent one elected official to the House of Commons.

The House of Commons delegates elected a Speaker (Richard Dobbs Spaight), Clerk (John Hunt), Assistant Clerk (John Haywood), Doorkeeper (Peter Gooding), and Assistant Doorkeeper (James Malloy). The following delegates to the House of Commons were elected by the voters of North Carolina to represent each county and district:

County/District	Delegate
Anson	James Terry (Note: James Terry was unacceptable as a delegate because of his Loyalist past. The assembly requested a new election in Anson County in December 1785 for the next General Assembly.)
Anson	Vacant / Unknown
Beaufort	Henry Smaw
Beaufort	John Gray Blount
Bertie	Thomas Collins
Bertie	Andrew Oliver
Bladen	James Richardson
Bladen	Vacant / Unknown
Brunswick	Jacob Leonard
Brunswick	David Flowers
Burke	Joseph McDowell
Burke	Waightstill Avery
Camden	Enoch Sawyer
Camden	Selby Harney
Carteret	David Cooper
Carteret	Eli West
Caswell	Robert Dickens
Caswell	Adam Sanders
Chatham	Joseph Stewart
Chatham	Roger Griffith
Chowan	Dr. Hugh Williamson
Chowan	Clement Hall
Craven	Richard Dobbs Spaight
Craven	Abner Neale
Cumberland	Robert Rowan
Cumberland	David Smith
Currituck	Joseph Ferebee
Currituck	Dr. James White
Davidson	Elijah Robertson
Davidson	William Polk
Dobbs	Benjamin Coleman
Dobbs	William Sheppard
Duplin	Robert Dickson
Duplin	Joseph Thomas Rhodes
Edgecombe	Robert Diggs
Edgecombe	Etheldred Phillips
Franklin	Thomas Sherrod
Franklin	Durham Hall
Gates	Vacant / Unknown
Gates	Seth Riddick
Granville	Thomas Person
Granville	Philemon Hawkins, Jr.
Greene	Vacant
Greene	Vacant
Guilford	John Hamilton
Guilford	Barzillai Gardner
Halifax	John Whitaker
Halifax	John Baptista Ashe
Hertford	James Manney
Hertford	Robert Montgomery
Hyde	John Eborne
Hyde	Thomas Jordan, Jr. (Note: There were problems with Thomas Jordon's qualifications because he held the position of Entry Taker. A new election was requested and the voters again elected Thomas Jordan.)
Johnston	Hardy Bryan
Johnston	Benjamin Williams
Jones	Abner Nash
Jones	John Isler
Lincoln	John Sloan
Lincoln	Daniel McKissick
Martin	Edmund Smithwick
Martin	Samuel Williams
Mecklenburg	Caleb Phifer
Mecklenburg	George Alexander
Montgomery	James McDonald
Montgomery	Charles Robertson
Moore	John Cox
Moore	John Carroll
Nash	Micajah Thomas
Nash	John Bonds
New Hanover	James Bloodworth
New Hanover	John Pugh Williams
Northampton	Howell Edmunds
Northampton	Augustin Woods
Onslow	Edward Starkey
Onslow	Reuben Grant
Orange	William Courtney
Orange	William Cain
Pasquotank	Edward Everagin
Pasquotank	Abraham Symons
Perquimans	John Skinner
Perquimans	Robert Riddick
Pitt	John Jordan
Pitt	Richard Moye
Randolph	Joseph Robbins
Randolph	Aaron Hill
Richmond	Robert Webb
Richmond	Benjamin Covington
Rowan	Matthew Locke
Rowan	George Henry Barrier, aka George H. Berger
Rutherford	Richard Singleton
Rutherford	George Moore
Sampson	David Dodd
Sampson	John Hay
Sullivan	Vacant
Sullivan	Vacant
Surry	William Lewis
Surry	James Martin
Tyrrell	Nehemiah Norman (Note: Nehemiah Norman died on December 28, 1785.)
Tyrrell	Nathan Hooker
Wake	James Hinton
Wake	William Hayes
Warren	Henry Montfort
Warren	Wyatt Hawkins
Washington	Vacant
Washington	Vacant
Wayne	William Taylor
Wayne	John Handley
Wilkes	Jesse Franklin
Wilkes	William T. Lewis
Edenton District	Stephen Cabarrus
Halifax District	Dr. Charles Pasteur
Hillsborough District	John Taylor
New Bern District	William Tisdale
Salisbury District	Thomas Frohock
Wilmington District	Archibald MacLaine

=== Senate members ===
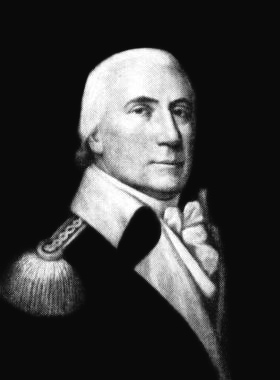
Alexander Martin, Guilford County

The Senators elected a President (Alexander Martin), Clerk (John Haywood), Assistant Clerk (Sherwood Haywood), Doorkeeper (William Murphy), and Assistant Doorkeeper (Nicholas Murphy). The following Senators were elected by the voters of North Carolina to represent each county:

County	Senator
Anson	Stephen Miller
Beaufort	John Smaw
Bertie	Jonathan Jaycocks
Bladen	Thomas Brown
Brunswick	Dennis Hawkins
Burke	Charles McDowell
Camden	Isaac Gregory
Carteret	John Easton
Caswell	Dempsey Moore
Chatham	Ambrose Ramsey
Chowan	Michael Payne
Craven	James Coor
Cumberland	Thomas Armstrong
Currituck	Willis Etheridge
Davidson	Anthony Bledsoe
Dobbs	John Herritage
Duplin	James Gillespie (Note: Although elected to the Council of State on December 11, James Gillespie is thought to have finished his term in the Senate.)
Edgecombe	Elisha Battle
Franklin	Henry Hill
Gates	Joseph Riddick
Granville	Howell Lewis
Greene	Vacant
Guilford	Alexander Martin
Halifax	Benjamin McCulloch
Hertford	Thomas Wynns
Hyde	Abraham Jones
Johnston	Arthur Bryan
Jones	Frederick Hargett
Lincoln	Robert Alexander
Martin	Vacant / Unknown
Mecklenburg	James Harris
Montgomery	Samuel Parsons
Moore	Henry Lightfoot
Nash	Hardy Griffin
New Hanover	John A. Campbell
Northampton	Samuel Lockhart (Note: Samuel Lockhart was elected Sheriff of Hyde County and had to resign his position in the Senate. A new election was required at the end of December.)
Onslow	John Spicer (Note: Although John Spicer was elected to Council of State, it is thought that he fulfilled his term in the Senate.)
Orange	William McCauley
Pasquotank	Thomas Relfe
Perquimans	William Skinner (Note: William Skinner was elected to another office, the Continental Loan office, Treasurer of the Continental Loan Office, on December 14, 1785. He was required to resign as delegate.)
Pitt	John Williams
Randolph	Edward Sharpe
Richmond	Henry William Harrington
Rowan	Griffith Rutherford
Rutherford	James Miller
Sampson	Richard Clinton
Sullivan	Vacant
Surry	John Armstrong
Tyrrell	John Warrington
Wake	Thomas Hines
Warren	John Macon
Washington	Vacant
Wayne	Burwell Mooring
Wilkes	Benjamin Herndon

== Legislation ==
The assembly passed the acts concerning:

- establishing a post-war militia
- jurisdictions of the Court of Pleas and Quarter Sessions, North Carolina justice of the peace and other courts
- regulation of commerce and imports
- collection of public debt
- emitting paper currency
- regulating the towns of Wilmington, Edenton, and Fayetteville; regulating and restraining the conduct of slaves and others in these towns
- securing and quieting forfeited estates
- raising revenues and suppressing excessive gambling
- levying taxes and redemption of Continental money
- opening land offices
- dealing with traitors and loyalists
- registration of marriage contracts
- liquidating accounts of officers and soldiers of the continental line and reviving district board of auditors for a limited time
- relief of disabled veterans of the late war
- recovering artillery belonging to the state that was thrown into the river at Edenton
- settling accounts between the United States and the state of North Carolina
- making provision for the poor, including building houses for them
- regulation of the town of Tarborough
- resolving disputes regarding building mills in certain counties
- relief of children and widows of soldiers that died in the service of the United States
- creating Rockingham County from Guilford County and selecting board of trustees for Salisbury Academy in Salisbury District
- annexing part of Pitt County to Beaufort County
- preventing blocking or obstructing of ways leading to houses of public worship
- empowering County Courts of Pleas and Quarter Session to deal with public roads, ferries and bridges
- securing literary property
- duties and salaries of public printer
- destruction of wolves, wildcats, panthers, bears, crows, and squirrels in several counties
- promoting learning in Davidson County at Davidson Academy
- establishing Grove Academy in Duplin County
- conveying common land to Smith Academy in Edenton
- establishing Kinston Academy in Dobbs County
- repairing jails and court houses, establishing a gaol in Edenton District
- changing the location of the county court in Beaufort County from Bath to Washington
- acts dealing with personal estates
- pardoning the citizens of Washington, Sullivan and Green counties if they return to allegiance to North Carolina
- establishing a Superior Court in Davidson County
- temporarily preventing distillation of spirituous liquors in Davidson County
- appointing tobacco inspectors in some counties
- establishing towns: on the land of Whitmell Hill in Martin County on the Roanoke River; on the lands of Luke Mizell and William MacKay in Martin County; on the land of Mial Scurlock in Chatham, County; on the land of Jessee Peacock in Sampson County; in Lincoln County; at Guilford Courthouse named Martinville; in the fork of the Cumberland and Red River on the east side of the Red River in Davidson County; Morgan in Morgan District

For additional details on minutes of the assembly and laws, see Legislative Documents.

== See also ==
- List of North Carolina state legislatures
