= Henry Henderson (baseball) =

American baseball player (1905–1980)

- First baseman
- Born: May 1, 1905; Hamilton County, Tennessee, U.S.
- Died: August 8, 1980 (aged 75); Chattanooga, Tennessee, U.S.

Negro league baseball debut
- 1932, for the Nashville Elite Giants

Last appearance
- 1932, for the Nashville Elite Giants

Teams
- Nashville Elite Giants (1932)

Henry Henderson (May 1, 1905 – August 8, 1980) was an American Negro league first baseman in the 1930s.

A native of Hamilton County, Tennessee, Henderson was the younger brother of fellow Negro leaguer Leonard Henderson. He played for the Nashville Elite Giants in 1932. Henderson died in Chattanooga, Tennessee in 1980 at age 75.
