= List of North Carolina state legislatures =

The North Carolina General Assembly of the U.S. state of North Carolina has convened many times since the state declared its independence from the British Crown and established a constitution in December 1776 during the Fifth North Carolina Provincial Congress.

Prior to 1957, the General Assembly convened in January at a time fixed by the Constitution of North Carolina. From 1957 through 1967, sessions convened in February at a time fixed by the Constitution. The 1969 General Assembly was the first to convene on a date fixed by law after elimination of the constitutionally fixed date. The assembly now convenes on the third Wednesday after the second Monday in January after the November election.

== History of the legislatures ==
The new General Assembly, which first convened in April 1777, consisted of a Senate, which had one member from each county (regardless of population), and a House of Commons, which had two members representing each county, plus one each from certain towns/districts.

- Only protestant men owning land (100 acres for the House of Commons, 300 acres for the Senate) could serve. Early assemblies met in multiple locations in North Carolina when there was not a state capital.
- In 1789 at the Fayetteville Convention, the constitution was amended to substitute the word "Christian" for "Protestant". Fayetteville was also added as a borough/town.
- In 1792, a commission was appointed to select a site to build a permanent state capital. The commission members favored land owned by Colonel John Hinton across the Neuse River, but the night before the final vote the committee adjourned to the home of Joel Lane in Wake County for an evening of food and spirits. The next day, the vote went in Lane's favor and the capital has been in Raleigh ever since.
- In the North Carolina Constitutional Convention of 1835, the constitution was amended to make the Governor elected by the people, but the legislature still elected all other officials. Amendments also set the number of senators at 50 and the number of commoners at 120. Senators would now be elected by districts representing approximately equal numbers of citizens, rather than by counties. Members of the House were still elected by county, but more populous counties were entitled to more representatives.
- In 1868, a new constitution changed the name of the House of Commons to the House of Representatives. It also established the office of Lieutenant Governor. Previously, the Speaker of the Senate was the constitutional successor to the Governor in case of death or resignation. Property qualifications for holding office were also abolished. This constitution also established administrative townships in every county. The power to elect executive officers and judges was taken from legislators and given to the people in this session. The House of Commons was renamed as the House of Representatives. The Speaker of the Senate was abolished and the newly-created Lt. Governor became the President of the Senate when it was in session; next in line became the President Pro Tempore elected by members.
- In 1868, African Americans were first elected to the General Assembly (fifteen representatives and two senators). But after Democrats consolidated power in the late 1890s, no African Americans were elected until Henry Frye (a Democrat) in 1968.
- Lillian Exum Clement became the first female member of the General Assembly in 1921
- The North Carolina Constitution was rewritten in 1971.

== Legislatures ==
The following table shows when and where the North Carolina General Assembly met. The numbered order indicates a new election.

Election Order	Assembly Link	Location	Dates of Sessions	Comments about assemblies and legislation	Image	Last Election
North Carolina Constitution of 1776						
1	1777	New Bern	April 7 – May 9, 1777; November 15 – December 24, 1777	This assembly probably met in the Tryon Palace after it was vacated by the British. Created Burke, Camden, Caswell, Nash, and Wilkes counties. Total of 38 counties and seven Districts were represented in the assembly. The assembly elected the Councilors of State. The governor was elected in the Fifth North Carolina Provincial Congress.	Tryon Palace	
2	1778	New Bern; Hillsborough; Halifax	April 14 – May 2, 1778; August 8–19, 1778; January 19 – February 13, 1779	This assembly established the following counties in their last session in 1779: Franklin, Gates, Jones, Lincoln, Montgomery, Randolph, Richmond, Rutherford, Warren, and Wayne counties. The assembly elected the governor and councilors of state per the state constitution of 1776.		
3	1779	Smithfield; Halifax; New Bern	May 3–15, 1779; October 18 – November 10, 1779; January – February, 1780			
4	1780–1781	unknown; unknown; Halifax	April 1780; (probably 1780); January 27 – February 13, 1781	The journals for this assembly are missing.		
5	1781	Wake Court House	June 23 – July 14, 1781	The town of Wake Court House later became Bloomsbury, which is currently a historic district in Raleigh.		
6	1782	Hillsborough	April 15 – May 18, 1782			
7	1783	Hillsborough	April 18 – May 17, 1783	This assembly created Davidson and Greene counties.		
8	April 1784	New Bern	April 19 – June 3, 1784	Davidson County and Greene County sent delegates to the NC General Assembly for the first time in 1784. During 1784, the assembly created Moore County and Sampson County. These two counties also sent delegates to the NC General Assembly for the first time in 1784.		
9	October 1784	New Bern	October 25 – November 26, 1784			
10	1785	New Bern	November 19 – December 29, 1785	During 1785, the assembly created Rockingham County.		
11	1786	Fayetteville	November 20, 1786 – January 6, 1787	In 1786, Rockingham County sent its first delegates to the assembly.		
12	1787	Tarboro	November 19 – December 22, 1787	During 1786, the assembly created Hawkins County and Sumner County. These two counties sent their first delegates to the NC General Assembly in 1787. During the earlier 1786/1787 session, the assembly created Robeson County, and its first delegates showed up later in the same session.		
13	1788	Fayetteville	November 3 – December 6, 1788	This assembly created Iredell County and Tennessee County, North Carolina.		
14	1789	Fayetteville	November 2 – December 22, 1789	Iredell and Tennessee counties sent their first delegates to the assembly. Fayetteville was added as a city/borough with a Senator. This General Assembly ceded the lands west of the Appalachian Mountains to the U.S. Government as part of North Carolina's national debt. This assembly elected the first two U.S. senators from North Carolina and established a process for the people to elect five members to the U.S. House of Representatives in early 1790. This assembly established the University of North Carolina and appropriated funds for the initial buildings.		
15	1790	Fayetteville	November 1 – December 15, 1790	During 1789, the assembly created Stokes County. In 1790, Stokes County sent its first delegates to the NC General Assembly. This was also the first General Assembly that allowed the Borough Town of Fayetteville to elect and send a delegate to the House of Representatives. Also during 1789, North Carolina ceded seven counties on the western side of the Appalachian Mountains to the newly-established "Southwest Territory," which later became the state of Tennessee in 1796: Davidson, Greene, Hawkins, Sullivan, Sumner, Tennessee, and Washington. These seven counties no longer sent delegates to the NC General Assembly.		
16	1791-1792	New Bern	December 5, 1791 – January 19, 1792			
17	1792-1793	New Bern	November 15 – January 1, 1793	During 1791, the assembly created four new counties: Buncombe, Glasgow, Lenoir, and Person. These four counties sent their first delegates to the NC General Assembly in 1792.		
18	1793-1794	Fayetteville	December 2, 1793 – January 11, 1794			
19	1794-1795	Raleigh	December 30, 1794 – February 7, 1795	This was the first assembly to meet in the newly completed North Carolina State House in Raleigh.	North Carolina State House (watercolor by Glennie)	
20	1795	Raleigh	November 2 – December 9, 1795			
21	1796	Raleigh	November 21 – December 25, 1796			
22	1797	Raleigh	November 20 – December 23, 1797			
23	1798	Raleigh	November 19 – December 24, 1798			
24	1799	Raleigh	November 18 – December 23, 1799			
25	1800	Raleigh	November 17 – December 20, 1800	During 1799, the assembly created two new counties: Ashe and Washington. Also in 1799, Glasgow County was renamed to Greene County. In 1800, these three counties sent their first delegates to the NC General Assembly.		
26	1801	Raleigh	November 16 – December 19, 1801			
27	1802	Raleigh	November 15 – December 18, 1802			
28	1803	Raleigh	November 21 – December 22, 1803			
29	1804	Raleigh	November 19 – December 19, 1804			
30	1805	Raleigh	November 18 – December 21, 1805			
31	1806	Raleigh	November 17 – December 21, 1806			
32	1807	Raleigh	November 16 – December 18, 1807			
33	1808	Raleigh	November 21 – December 23, 1808	Jacob Henry was the first Jewish American in the assembly, serving in the House of Commons for Buncombe County. See also, Jacob Henry House.		
34	1809	Raleigh	November 20 – December 23, 1809	In 1808, the assembly created two new counties - Columbus and Haywood. Both sent new delegates to the General Assembly in 1809.		
35	1810	Raleigh	November 19 – December 22, 1810			
36	1811	Raleigh	November 18 – December 23, 1811	This was the first General Assembly to meet in the newly renovated North Carolina State House in Raleigh.	Renovated North Carolina State House (watercolor by William Goodacre)	
37	1812	Raleigh	November 16 – December 25, 1812			
38	1813	Raleigh	November 15 – December 25, 1813			
39	1814	Raleigh	November 21 – December 27, 1814			
40	1815	Raleigh	November 20 – December 21, 1815			
41	1816	Raleigh	November 18 – December 28, 1816			
42	1817	Raleigh	November 17 – December 24, 1817			
43	1818	Raleigh	November 16 – December 26, 1818			
44	1819	Raleigh	November 15 – December 25, 1819			
45	1820	Raleigh	November 20 – December 25, 1820			
46	1821-1822	Raleigh	November 19, 1821 – January 1, 1822			
47	1822	Raleigh	November 18 – December 31, 1822			
48	1823-1824	Raleigh	November 17, 1823 – January 1, 1824	In 1822, the assembly created Davidson County. In 1823, Davidson County sent their first delegates to the NC General Assembly.		
49	1824-1825	Raleigh	November 15, 1824 – January 5, 1825			
50	1825-1826	Raleigh	November 21, 1825 – January 4, 1826			
51	1826-1827	Raleigh	December 25, 1826 – February 12, 1827			
52	1827-1828	Raleigh	November 19, 1827 – January 7, 1828			
53	1828-1829	Raleigh	November 17, 1828 – January 10, 1829			
54	1829-1830	Raleigh	November 16, 1829 – January 8, 1830	During 1828, the assembly created Macon County. In 1829, Macon County sent their first delegates to the NC General Assembly.		
55	1830-1831	Raleigh	November 15, 1830 – January 8, 1831			
56	1831-1832	Raleigh	November 21, 1831 – January 14, 1832			
57	1832-1833	Raleigh	November 18, 1832 – January 11, 1833			
58	1833-1834	Raleigh	November 18, 1833 – January 13, 1834	1832 assembly not listed.		
59	1834-1835	Raleigh	November 17, 1834 – January 10, 1835	During 1833, the assembly created Yancey County. In 1834, Yancey County sent its first delegates to the NC General Assembly.		
60	1835	Raleigh	November 16 – December 22, 1835	This was the last assembly to have representatives from Districts, i.e. Edenton, Fayetteville, Halifax, Hillsborough, New Bern, Salisbury, and Wilmington.		
61	1836–1837	Raleigh	November 21, 1836 – January 23, 1837	Per the North Carolina Constitutional Convention of 1835, the House of Commons was authorized a total of one hundred-twenty (120) delegates. Each county was authorized a minimum of one delegate, while the most populous counties were authorized four delegates. Each delegate was elected for a two year term of office. During the 1836 session, the assembly created Davie County, but it was not until 1842 that Davie County began sending delegates to the General Assembly.		
62	1838-1839	Raleigh	November 19, 1838 – January 8, 1839	During the 1838 session, the assembly created Henderson County, but it was not until 1844 that Henderson County began sending delegates to the General Assembly. During the 1839 session, the assembly created Cherokee County, and they sent their first delegates to the 1840 General Assembly.		
63	1840-1841	Raleigh	November 16, 1840 – January 12, 1841	This assembly was the first to meet in the newly constructed North Carolina State Capitol in Raleigh, which was built after the destruction of the North Carolina State House in 1831. Although it was created in 1838, according to most sources, Cherokee County began sending its delegate to the NC General Assembly during the 1840 session. No other county giving up a delegate in this session, so Cherokee County may not have actually been authorized to send a delegate during this session - or - the NC General Assembly proceeded with 121 delegates. During the 1841 session, the assembly created Caldwell County, Cleveland County, and Stanly County. Caldwell County began sending delegates to the NC General Assembly in 1842. Cleveland County and Stanly County began sending delegates to the NC General Assembly in 1844.	North Carolina State Capitol, completed in 1840	
64	1842-1843	Raleigh	November 21, 1842 – January 28, 1843	Davie County was established in 1836, but it did not begin sending any delegates to the NC General Assembly until 1842. Caldwell County was established in 1841, and it began sending its delegates to the NC General Assembly in 1842. During 1842, the assembly created Catawba County, McDowell County, and Union County. McDowell County sent its first delegates to the NC General Assembly in 1852. Catawba County and Union County began sending their first delegates to the NC General Assembly in 1854.		
65	1844-1845	Raleigh	November 18, 1844 – January 10, 1845	The reapportioning of the North Carolina House of Commons based upon the 1840 US Census was finally completed and implemented this year, and there were plenty of changes. With the creation of new counties since the last reapportionment, many existing counties had to give up one delegate to retain the number of members as stipulated in the latest NC State Constitution (120). However, Cabarrus County added one delegate. Although Henderson County was established in 1838, and Cleveland County and Stanly County were established in 1841, all three began sending their first delegates to the NC General Assembly in 1844.		
66	1846-1847	Raleigh	November 16, 1846 – January 18, 1847			
67	1848-1849	Raleigh	November 20, 1848 – January 27, 1849	Although Catawba County was established in 1842, it did not begin sending its first delegates to the General Assembly until 1848.		
68	1850-1851	Raleigh	November 18, 1850 – January 29, 1851			
69	1852	Raleigh	October 4 – December 27, 1852			
70	1854-1855	Raleigh	November 20, 1854 – February 16, 1855	Although McDowell County and Union County were established in 1842; Gaston County was established in 1846; Alexander County was established in 1847; Alamance, Forsyth, and Watauga Counties were established in 1849; Yadkin County was established in 1850; and, Jackson County and Madison County were established in 1851; all ten counties began sending their first delegates to the General Assembly in 1854.		
71	1856-1857	Raleigh	November 17, 1856 – February 3, 1857	In 1856, the Assembly eliminated the requirement to own property in order to vote; however, only tax payers could vote.		
72	1858-1859	Raleigh	November 15, 1858 – February 17, 1859			
73	1860–1861	Raleigh	November 19, 1860 – February 25, 1861.	Extra Session: May 1, 1861 – May 13, 1861. Extra Session: August 15, 1861 – September 23, 1861 This General Assembly decided that each county should vote for special delegates who would decide whether North Carolina should secede from the Union. On May 20, 1861, those special delegates convened in Raleigh and voted unanimously that the state would no longer be a part of the United States of America.	Flag of North Carolina (1861–1865)	
74	1862–1864	Raleigh	November 17 – December 22, 1862	Extra Sessions: January 19 – February 12, 1863; June 30 – July 7, 1863; November 23 – December 14, 1863; and May 17–30, 1864.		
75	1864-1865	Raleigh	November 21 – December 23, 1864	Extra Sessions: January 17 – February 7, 1865 and May 17–28, 1865.		
76	1865-1866	Raleigh	November 27 – December 18, 1865.	Extra Session: January 18 – March 12, 1866 This was the first General Assembly to meet after the US Civil War, and Reconstruction was just beginning. Although Harnett County had been established in 1855, it was not until 1865 that Harnett County sent their first delegates to the NC General Assembly. As a result, Cumberland County had to give up one member in the House of Commons.		
77	1866-1867	Raleigh	November 19 – December 24, 1866	Extra Session: January 22 – March 4, 1867 On March 4, 1867, the Reconstruction Acts of the U.S. Congress stipulated that North Carolina would be part of the Second Military District until they ratified the 14th Amendment.		
North Carolina Constitution of 1868						
78	1868–1869	Raleigh	November 16, 1868 – April 12, 1869	The House of Commons was renamed the House of Representatives. The assembly had extra Session from July 1 to August 24, 1868, in which they ratified the 14th Amendment. Although they had been established several years earlier, the following counties sent their first delegates to the 1868 General Assembly: Alleghany, Clay, Mitchell, Polk, Transylvania, and Wilson. This was the first assembly to have Black members in the house and senate. North Carolina was re-admitted to the Union on July 4, 1868 when they ratified the 14th Amendment.		
79	1869-1870	Raleigh	November 15, 1869 – March 28, 1870			
80	1870-1872	Raleigh	November 21, 1870 – April 6, 1871	Extra Session: November 20, 1871 – February 18, 1872. Governor William Woods Holden was impeached by the House on December 14, 1870 and convicted by the Senate on March 22, 1871. Governor Holden was the first governor to be convicted and removed from office in the United States.		
81	1872-1874	Raleigh	November 18, 1872 – March 3, 1873	Extra Session: November 17, 1873 – February 16, 1874 Dare County and Swain County sent their first delegates to this General Assembly.		
82	1874-1875	Raleigh	November 16, 1874 – March 22, 1875			
83	1876-1877	Raleigh	November 20, 1876 – March 12, 1877	Pender County was established in 1875, and it sent their first delegates to the 1876 NC General Assembly. As a result, New Hanover County had to give up one member in the House of Representatives.		
84	1879-1880	Raleigh	January 8, 1879 – March 14, 1879	Extra Session: March 15 – March 29, 1880.		
85	1881	Raleigh	January 5 – March 14, 1881	Durham County was established in 1881 and it sent their first delegates to this NC General Assembly. Orange County had to give up one member of the House of Representatives as a result.		
86	1883	Raleigh	January 3 – March 12, 1883	Although Graham County and Pamlico County were established in 1872, and Vance County was established in 1881, all three sent their first delegates to the 1883 NC General Assembly.		
87	1885	Raleigh	January 7 – March 11, 1885			
88	1887	Raleigh	January 5 – March 7, 1887			
89	1889	Raleigh	January 9 – March 11, 1889			
90	1891	Raleigh	January 7 – March 9, 1891			
91	1893	Raleigh	January 4 – March 6, 1893			
92	1895	Raleigh	January 9 – March 13, 1895			
93	1897	Raleigh	January 6 – March 9, 1897			
94	1899–1900	Raleigh	January 4 – March 8, 1899			
95	1901	Raleigh	January 9 – March 15, 1901	Scotland County was established in 1899 and it sent their first delegates to the 1901 General Assembly. As a result, Richmond County had to give up one member in the House of Representatives.		
96	1903	Raleigh	January 7 – March 9, 1903			
97	1905	Raleigh	January 4 – March 6, 1905			
98	1907-1908	Raleigh	January 9-March 11	Extra Session: January 21 – February 1, 1908.		
99	1909	Raleigh	January 6 – March 9, 1909			
100	1911	Raleigh	January 4 – March 8, 1911			
101	1913	Raleigh	January 8 – March 12, 1913	Extra Session: September 24, 1913 Although Lee County was established in 1907, and Avery County and Hoke County were established in 1911, all three began sending their first delegates to this General Assembly.		
102	1915	Raleigh	January 6 – March 9, 1915			
103	1917	Raleigh	January 3 – March 7, 1917			
104	1919-1920	Raleigh	January 8 – March 11, 1919	Extra Session: August 10–26, 1920.		
105	1921	Raleigh	January 5 – March 9, 1921	First female representative in the House of Representatives, Lillian Exum Clement.	Rep. Lillian Exum Clement	
106	1923-1924	Raleigh	January 3 – March 6, 1923	Extra Session: August 7–23, 1924.		
107	1925	Raleigh	January 7 – March 10, 1925			
108	1927	Raleigh	January 5 – March 9, 1927			
109	1929	Raleigh	January 9 – March 19, 1929			
110	1931	Raleigh	January 7 – May 27, 1931	Gertrude Dills McKee was the first female Senator.	Legislators of the 1931 General Assembly with staff outside the Capitol	
111	1933	Raleigh	January 4 – May 15, 1933			
112	1935-1936	Raleigh	January 9 – May 11, 1935	Extra Session: December 10–16, 1936.		
113	1937-1938	Raleigh	January 6 – March 23, 1937	Extra Session: March 8 – August 13, 1938.		
114	1939	Raleigh	January 4 – April 4, 1939			
115	1941	Raleigh	January 8 – March 15, 1941			
116	1943	Raleigh	January 6 – March 10, 1943			
117	1945	Raleigh	January 3 – March 12, 1945			
118	1947	Raleigh	January 8 – April 5, 1947			
119	1949	Raleigh	January 5 – April 23, 1949			
120	1951	Raleigh	January 3 – April 14, 1951			
121	1953	Raleigh	January 7 – April 30, 1953			
122	1955-1956	Raleigh	January 5 – May 26, 1955	Extra Session: July 23–27, 1956.		
123	1957	Raleigh	February 6 – June 12, 1957			
124	1959	Raleigh	February 4 – June 20, 1959			
125	1961	Raleigh	February 8 – June 22, 1961	This General Assembly was the last to meet in the North Carolina State Capital building in Raleigh.		
126	1963	Raleigh	February 6 – June 26, 1963	This was the first assembly to meet in the newly completed North Carolina State Legislative Building in Raleigh.	North Carolina Legislative Building, completed in 1963	
127	1965-1966	Raleigh	February 3 – June 17, 1965	Extra Session: November 15–17, 1965. Second Extra Session: January 10–14, 1966.		
128	1967	Raleigh	February 8 – July 6, 1967			
129	1969	Raleigh	January 15 – July 2, 1969			
130	1971	Raleigh	January 13 – October 30, 1971			
North Carolina Constitution of 1971						
131	1973-1974	Raleigh	January 10 – May 24, 1973; January 16 – April 13, 1974	Beginning at this General Assembly, the assembly met in both years from henceforth.		
132	1975-1976	Raleigh	January 15 – June 26, 1975; May 3–14, 1976			
133	1977-1978	Raleigh	January 12 – July 1, 1977; May 31 – June 16, 1978			
134	1979-1980	Raleigh	January 10 – June 8, 1779; June 5–25, 1980			
135	1981-1982	Raleigh	January 14 – July 10, 1981; October 5–10, 1982; April 26–27, 1982	Extra Sessions: October 29–30, 1981; February 9–11, 1982; June 2–28, 1982.		
136	1983-1984	Raleigh	January 12 – July 22, 1983; March 7 – July 7, 1984	Extra Session: August 26, 1983 (one day).		
137	1985-1986	Raleigh	February 5 – July 18, 1985; February 18 – July 16, 1986			
138	1987-1988	Raleigh	February 9 – August 14, 1987; June 2 – July 12, 1988			
139	1989-1990	Raleigh	January 11 – August 12, 1989; March 6 – July 28, 1990	Extra Session: December 7, 1989 (one day).		
140	1991-1992	Raleigh	January 30 – July 16, 1991; May 26 – July 25, 1992	Extra Session: December 30, 1991 – February 3, 1992.		
141	1993-1994	Raleigh	January 27 – September 24, 1993; March 24 – July 17, 1994	Extra Session February 8 – March 26, 1994.		
142	1995-1996	Raleigh	January 25 – July 29, 1995; May 13 – June 21, 1996	Daniel F. McComas was the first Hispanic member of the House of Representatives. Extra Session: February 21, 1996 (one day).		
143	1997-1998	Raleigh	January 29 – August 28, 1997; May 11 – October 29, 1998	Extra Session: March 24 – April 30, 1998.		
144	1999-2000	Raleigh	January 27 – July 21, 1999; December 15–16, 1999; May 8, 2000	Extra Session: April 5, 2000		
145	2001–2002	Raleigh	January 24 – December 6, 2001; May 28 – November 13, 2002	Beverly Eaves Perdue was the first female North Carolina Lieutenant Governor and President of the Senate. Extra Session: May 14 – November 26, 2002.		November 2000: House, Senate
146	2003–2004	Raleigh	January 29 – August 27, 2003; May 10 – July 18, 2004	Extra Sessions: November 24–25, 2003; December 9–10, 2003; November 4, 2004 (one day).		November 2002: House, Senate
147	2005–2006	Raleigh	January 26 – October 12, 2005; May 9 – July 28, 2006			November 2004: House, Senate
148	2007–2008	Raleigh	January 24 – August 2, 2007; May 13 – July 18, 2008	Extra Sessions: September 10–11, 2007; March 20, 2008 (one day).		November 2006: House, Senate
149	2009–2010	Raleigh	January 28 – August 11, 2009; May 12 – July 10, 2010			November 2008: House, Senate
150	2011–2012	Raleigh	January 26 – June 18, 2011; May 16 – July 3, 2012	Extra Session: January 4 – February 18, 2012.		November 2010: House, Senate
151	2013–2014	Raleigh	January 9, January 30 – July 26, 2013; May 14 – August 20, 2014	Extra Session: September 3–4, 2013.		November 2012: House, Senate
152	2015–2016	Raleigh	January 14; January 28 – September 29, 2015; April 25 – July 1, 2016			November 2014: House, Senate
153	2017–2018	Raleigh	January 11 – June 30, 2017; August 3; August 18–25; August 28–31; October 4–17			November 2016: House, Senate
154	2019–2020	Raleigh	January 9 – July 12, 2019			November 2018: House, Senate
155	2021–2022	Raleigh	January 13 –			November 2020: House, Senate
156	2023–2024	Raleigh	January 11 –			November 2022: House, Senate
157	2025–2026	Raleigh	January 8 –			November 2024: House, Senate

== Conventions ==
Several state conventions were held to ratify state and national constitutions:

- 1788, Hillsborough Convention, United States Constitution
- 1789, Fayetteville Convention, U.S. Constitution
- 1835, North Carolina Constitutional Convention of 1835 in Raleigh
- 1861 Convention
  - First Session, Raleigh, May 20-June 28, 1861
  - Second Session, Raleigh, November 18-December 18, 1861
  - Third Session, Raleigh, January 20-February 26, 1862
  - Fourth Session, Raleigh, April 21-May 13, 1862
- 1865 Convention
  - First Session, Raleigh, October 2-October 19, 1865
  - Second Session, Raleigh, May 24-June 25, 1866
- 1868 Convention, Raleigh, January 14-March 17, 1868
- 1875 Convention, Raleigh, September 6-October 11, 1875

== See also ==
- List of speakers of the North Carolina House of Representatives
- List of presidents pro tempore of the North Carolina Senate
- List of governors of North Carolina
- Politics of North Carolina
- Elections in North Carolina
- North Carolina State Capitol
- Historical outline of North Carolina
- Lists of United States state legislative sessions
