= Leonard Henderson (baseball) =

American baseball player (1901–1979)

- Third baseman
- Born: January 22, 1901; Hamilton County, Tennessee, U.S.
- Died: March 1979; Jackson, Mississippi, U.S.
- Threw: Right

Negro league baseball debut
- 1930, for the Nashville Elite Giants

Last appearance
- 1932, for the Birmingham Black Barons
- Stats at Baseball Reference

Teams
- Nashville Elite Giants (1930, 1932); Louisville Black Caps (1932); Birmingham Black Barons (1932)

Leonard Lindsey Henderson (January 22, 1901 – March 1979), sometimes listed as "Lenon", was an American Negro league third baseman in the 1930s.

A native of Hamilton County, Tennessee, Henderson was the older brother of fellow Negro leaguer Henry Henderson. He made his Negro leagues debut in 1930 with the Nashville Elite Giants, played for Nashville again in 1932, and also spent time with the Louisville Black Caps and Birmingham Black Barons. Henderson died in Jackson, Mississippi in 1979 at age 78.
