= Smith-Whitford House =

Historic house in North Carolina, United States

- U.S. National Register of Historic Places
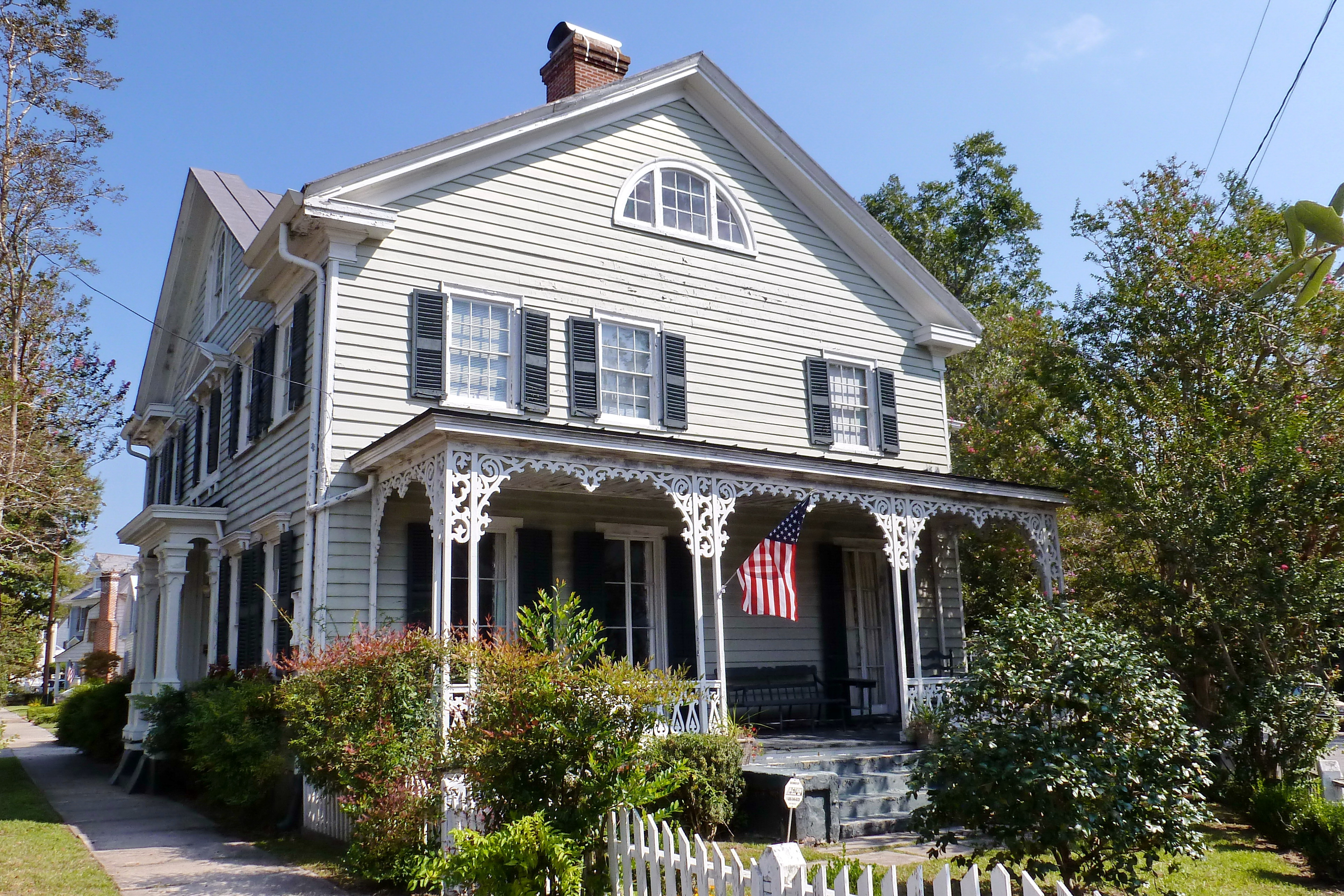
- Smith-Whitford House, September 2012

- Location within North Carolina Location within the United States
- Location: 506 Craven St., New Bern, North Carolina
- Coordinates: 35°6′36″N 77°2′16″W
- Area: 0.5 acres (0.20 ha)
- Built: c. 1772
- Built by: Coor, James
- Architectural style: Late Victorian, Georgian
- NRHP reference No.: 72000950
- Added to NRHP: April 13, 1972

Smith-Whitford House is a historic home located at New Bern, Craven County, North Carolina. It was built about 1772 and is a two-story, five-bay, central hall plan, Georgian style frame dwelling. The front entrance was recessed, and a shallow porch added during the Late Victorian period.

It was listed on the National Register of Historic Places in 1972.
