= Spruce Macay =

North Carolina judge (1755–1808)

- Born: 1755 (est.); Likely North Carolina
- Died: February 23, 1808; Rowan County, North Carolina

Spruce Macay (c. 1755–d. February 23, 1808) was a North Carolina judge and state representative. He is best known for the part he played in preparing future U.S. president Andrew Jackson for a law license in the state of North Carolina.

== Early life and education ==
Macay may have been born about 1755. Variant spellings of his name include Mackay, McKay, McCay, and McCoy. Records of the estate of his son articulate that Spruce Macay "belonged to the fourth generation of an American family founded by an immigrant from Scotland." In 1762, James Macay was granted 430 acres of land in Rowan County, North Carolina in the vicinity of the Yadkin River at "Swearing Creek, near the Jersey Meeting-house." James Macay was "probably" Spruce Macay's father, and in any event "he was from that neighborhood, and was buried there, with others of his family." Macay began at the College of New Jersey (now Princeton University) in 1771 and joined the Whig Society. He graduated 1775 with a B.A. degree, after having participated at graduation "in a three-way 'English forensick dispute' on the proposition that 'A retired, solitary life has no tendency to promote knowledge, happiness or virtue'."

In the telling of the History of Rowan County (1881):

At that early period, the Rev. David Caldwell, D.D., was conducting his classical school, on Buffalo, in Guilford County, then a part of Rowan, about forty miles from the Jerseys. Thither young Spruce Macay was sent for his literary training. He probably read law under John Dunn, Esq., of Salisbury, or it may be Waightstill Avery, who practised in these Courts. He was licensed to practice law about the beginning of the Revolutionary War, and devoted himself with energy to his profession, and soon became such a proficient that students came to him for instruction. In 1776, William R. Davie, just graduated at Princeton College, commenced the study of law in Salisbury, and the current opinion is that his preceptor was Spruce Macay.

The Princetonian Biographical Dictionary disputes or quibbles with some of these claims, arguing that studying with Dunn "seems unlikely in view of the fact that [he] was apprehended as an assumed Tory by the Rowan Committee a few weeks before Macay's graduation and spirited out of the state for an extended exile." The Avery association is deemed "possible...but this would argue that he spent some time in Charlotte, where Avery had his office, before beginning his own practice in Salisbury, probably in time for him to assist William R. Davie in preparation for the license he won from the Rowan County Court late in 1779."

== Career ==
1940 map of Salisbury, North Carolina

Macay worked out of the town of Salisbury, North Carolina. Per the Rowan County history, "His residence was on lot No. 19, of the West Ward, the property now owned by Mrs. Nathaniel Boyden, and his law office was in front of his dwelling on Jackson Street." Macay began practicing law in the Washington County Court of Pleas and Quarter Sessions sometime before August 1781. He was elected to the North Carolina Council of State 1781 to 1783. The North Carolina General Assembly appointed him to the Court of Oyer and Terminer for Washington County and Sullivan County in May 1782. He represented the town of Salisbury, North Carolina in the North Carolina House of Commons from 1784 to 1785. In 1786 he taught law to Andrew Jackson. In the telling of Jackson biographer Mark R. Cheathem, Jackson's training probably including copy work and reading law books. Macay was a co-founder of the Salisbury Library Company in 1789.

He was elected judge of the North Carolina Court of Law and Equity on December 1790. This was a demanding and influential position, and in "Traveling from courthouse to courthouse, including that at Jonesboro in what became Tennessee, Macay evidently acquired the reputation of a tough judge. A high point in his career had come in 1791 when as mayor of Salisbury, he formally received President Washington, then on a tour of the southern states." The North Carolina General Assembly "established biannual meetings of the judges of the superior courts in 1799, burdening the judges with the duty of arguing and determining open questions of law and equity from the circuits. The meetings contemplated the attendance of neither parties nor attorneys, and required seriatim written opinions of the judges' determinations of these questions. At this time, the judges of the superior courts were John Louis Taylor, John Haywood, John Williams, and Spruce Macay." From 1799 to 1801 these meetings were used to try the "notorious" Glasgow land fraud cases. Macay died 1808 and is buried at the Jersey Meeting-house, in Davidson County, North Carolina.

== Land and slaves ==
According to the Rowan County book, "Judge Macay bought the Frohock lands and mills, near Salisbury, on Grant's Creek, and owned lands in Davidson County. By inheritance with his wife, by industry and economy, he accumulated a large estate." A Spence Macay of North Carolina owned 19 slaves at the time of the 1790 U.S. census; his presumed father James Macay owned eight slaves. In his will written in 1803, Macay bequeathed a carriage to his wife and "by number or name 66 slaves, to whom must be added an unspecified number of children listed in such entries as 'Lucy and her children with Dick her husband' or 'Darcus and her children'." He owned substantial land in Rowan County as well as "6,000 acres in Tennessee and unspecified acreages situated in at least seven other North Carolina counties."

== Personal life ==
Macay married first Fanny Richardson, daughter of Richard Henderson and sister of Archibald Henderson and Leonard Henderson. Another Macay brother-in-law was Thomas Henderson, who was "clerk of the court in Guilford County...[and] a wealthy man in his own right, owning half the real estate in Martinville." Thomas Henderson was, in turn, brothers-in-law with Alexander Martin, former Governor of North Carolina, Founding Father, land speculator, and namesake of Martinville. Still another brother-in-law was Pleasant Henderson, secretary to Martin. Macay and Fanny Richardson had one child, Elizabeth Macay, who married William C. Love.

Macay married second Elizabeth Hays or Haynes, of Halifax, North Carolina. They had three children: Alfred Macay (died young), Fanny Macay, and William Spruce Macay.

- Fanny Macay married George Locke and moved to Tennessee
- William Spruce Macay married Belle Lowry then Annie Hunt

== See also ==
- Salisbury District, North Carolina

== Sources ==
- Cheathem, Mark R. (2014). Andrew Jackson, Southerner. Baton Rouge, Louisiana: Louisiana State University Press. ISBN 978-0-8071-5099-3. LCCN 2012049695. OCLC 858995561. Project MUSE book 26506.
- Davis, Thomas P.; Fish, J. Barrett, eds. (2024). Selected documents relating to law reform in North Carolina during the nineteenth century: with numerous documents from surrounding centuries to provide historical context. Raleigh, N.C: Historical Research and Publications Office, Office of Archives and History, Department of Natural and Cultural Resources. doi:10.1353/book.131751. ISBN 978-0-86526-507-3. OCLC 1481711099.
- Ely, James W. Jr.; Brown, Theodore Jr., eds. (1987). Legal Papers of Andrew Jackson. Supplement to the Papers of Andrew Jackson. Knoxville, Tennessee: University of Tennessee Press. ISBN 978-0-87049-355-3. LCCN 82002635. OCLC 17590211.
- Harrison, Richard A. (2014) [1981]. Princetonians, 1776–1783: A Biographical Dictionary. Princeton Legacy Library. Macay entry attributed to WFC (W. Frank Craven). Princeton: Princeton University Press. pp. 505–507. ISBN 978-1-4008-5653-4. Project MUSE book 34211.
- Rumple, Jethro (1929) [1881]. A History of Rowan County, North Carolina: Containing Sketches of Prominent Families and Distinguished Men, with an Appendix (Original publisher J.J. Bruner, Salisbury) (Reprint ed.). Elizabeth Maxwell Steele Chapter, Daughters of the American Revolution. LCCN 01006839. OCLC 1896611. OL 7004216W.
