= Thomas Benbury =

American politician

- Born: November 28, 1736; Chowan County, North Carolina
- Died: February 6, 1793 (aged 56); Chowan County, North Carolina
- Burial place: St. Paul's Church, Edenton; 36°03′40.6″N 76°36′31.8″W
- Spouse(s): Thamir Howcott (m. 1761), Elizabeth Unknown (m. 1769)
- Children: Thomas, Richard, and Mary
- Military career
- Allegiance: United States
- Branch: North Carolina Militia
- Rank: Brigadier General (Pro Tempore)
- Unit: Chowan County Regiment
- Commands: Edenton District Brigade

Thomas Benbury (November 28, 1736 – February 6, 1793) was a revolutionary leader in the early formation of the State of North Carolina. He was a member of the North Carolina Provincial Congress, a member of the North Carolina House of Commons from 1776 to 1782, Speaker of the House of Commons, and an officer in the Chowan County Regiment during the American Revolution.

== Early political career ==
Thomas Benbury was born on November 28, 1736, in Chowan County, Province of North Carolina. His father, John Benbury, and grandfather, William Benbury, came from England to an area near Edenton, North Carolina in 1701. Thomas became a planter and became sheriff of Chowan County in 1769. He was elected to the North Carolina Provincial Congress in 1771. He was an ardent Whig and member of five Provincial Congresses, beginning in August 1774 at New Bern. As the Revolutionary War approached, he was elected a member of the Chowan County Committee of Safety.

== Military service ==
Service record:

- Chowan County Regiment (1779-1783) Major.
- 6/21/1779, a known Lt. Colonel under Col. James Blount.
- October 1780, a Brigadier General (Pro Tempore) while BG Isaac Gregory marched westward. Back to Lt. Colonel until the end of the war.

He was appointed a major in the Chowan County Regiment. He served as Brigadier General (Pro Tempore) in the Edenton District Brigade in 1780.

He and Thomas Jones, along with the aid of Benjamin Franklin, purchased for the war effort 23 canons from France in 1778. They were to be delivered to Edenton by Captain William Borritz aboard the ship Holy Heart of Jesus. When Captain Boritz arrived in Edenton harbor in July 1778, he attempted to levy a transportation charge of 150 pounds of tobacco for every 100 pounds of cannon. There was not sufficient tobacco stores in Edenton to pay the levy, so the cannon were dumped in the harbor.

== Political career and personal life ==
He served in the North Carolina House of Commons from 1776 to 1782 and was speaker of the house from 1778 to 1782. His son, Richard Benbury, succeeded him in the house. In 1784, he was appointed collector of customs for the State of North Carolina at "Port Roanoke". After 1789, he was appointed federal collector of customs for the Port of Edenton by President George Washington.

He married Thamir Howcott, in 1761, and later after her death he married Elizabeth Unknown in 1769. By his first wife he had two sons, Thomas and Richard, and by his second wife, a daughter, Mary.

He was justice of the peace and a vestryman in the Anglican church in Edenton for most of his adult life. He died on February 6, 1793, and was buried at St. Paul's Church, Edenton.
