= Jonathan Skinner =

British author, journalist and Baptist minister

Jonathan Skinner is a British author, journalist, and Baptist minister. He was a minister at Widcombe Baptist Church in Bath, England. He has worked for the Universities and Colleges Christian Fellowship (UCCF).

Skinner is a writer for the Evangelical Times, which is a monthly newspaper published in Britain and circulated around the world, with a readership of over 40,000. He writes on faith, social issues, politics, and religion.

Skinner has a BSc degree in biochemistry and has taught science, working with students and discussing issues of science and faith.

Skinner is married with four children, named Elizabeth, Thomas, Henry and Susannah.

== Articles ==
- Is death the end?
- Hostage in Iraq
- Has Father Christmas upstaged Jesus?
- Shopping for God

== Books ==
- The Edge of Known Reality and Beyond, ISBN 0-85234-600-X, 2005, Evangelical Press
