= James Coor =

Architect, builder, politician and leader in North Carolina

Member of the North Carolina Senate from the Craven County, North Carolina district
- In office 1777–1787
- Preceded by: first General Assembly
- Succeeded by: Benjamin Williams

Personal details
- Born: before 1737 England
- Died: December 28, 1796 New Bern, North Carolina

James Coor (before 1737–1795) was an architect, builder, politician and leader in North Carolina.

== Early life ==
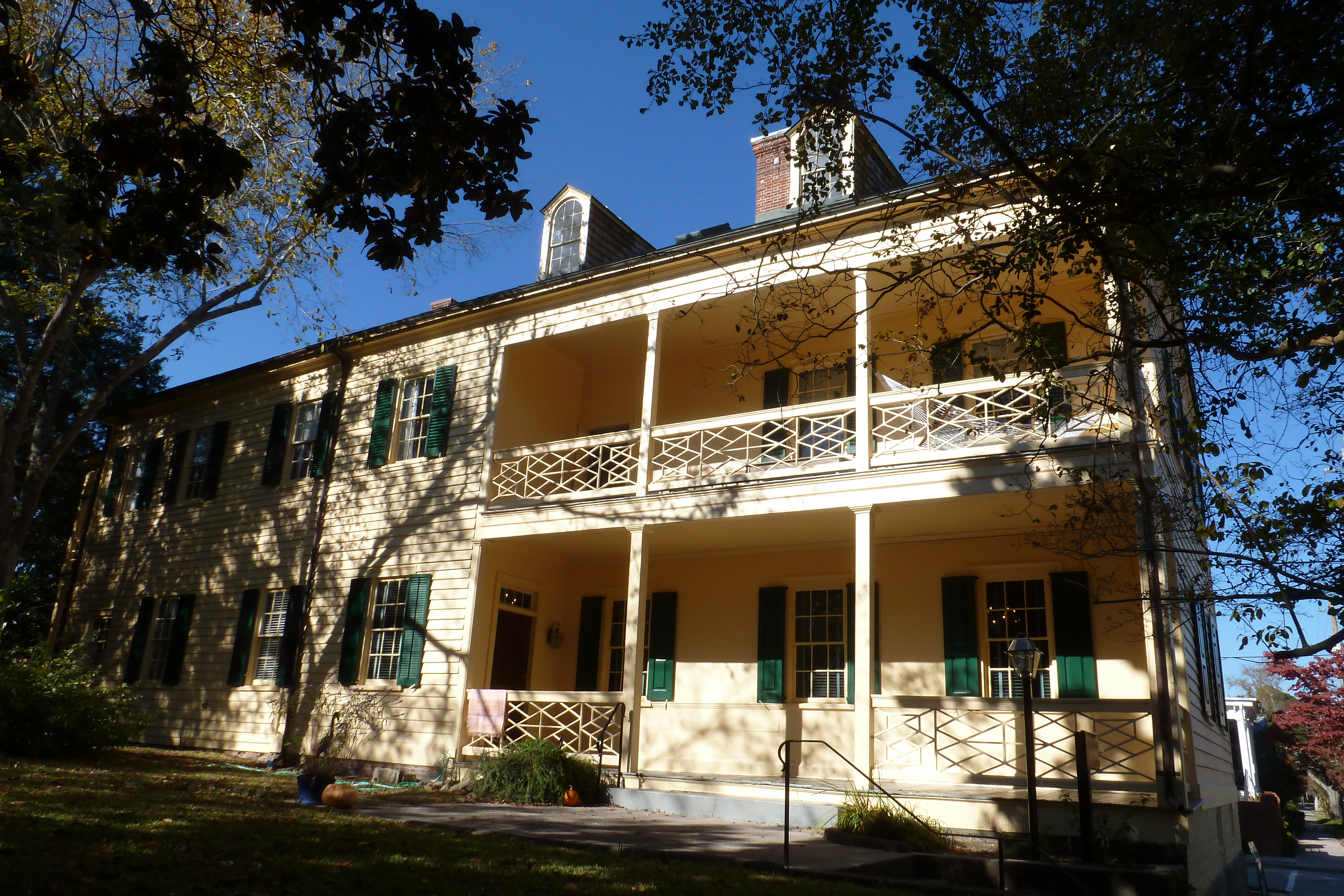
Coor-Gaston House in New Bern

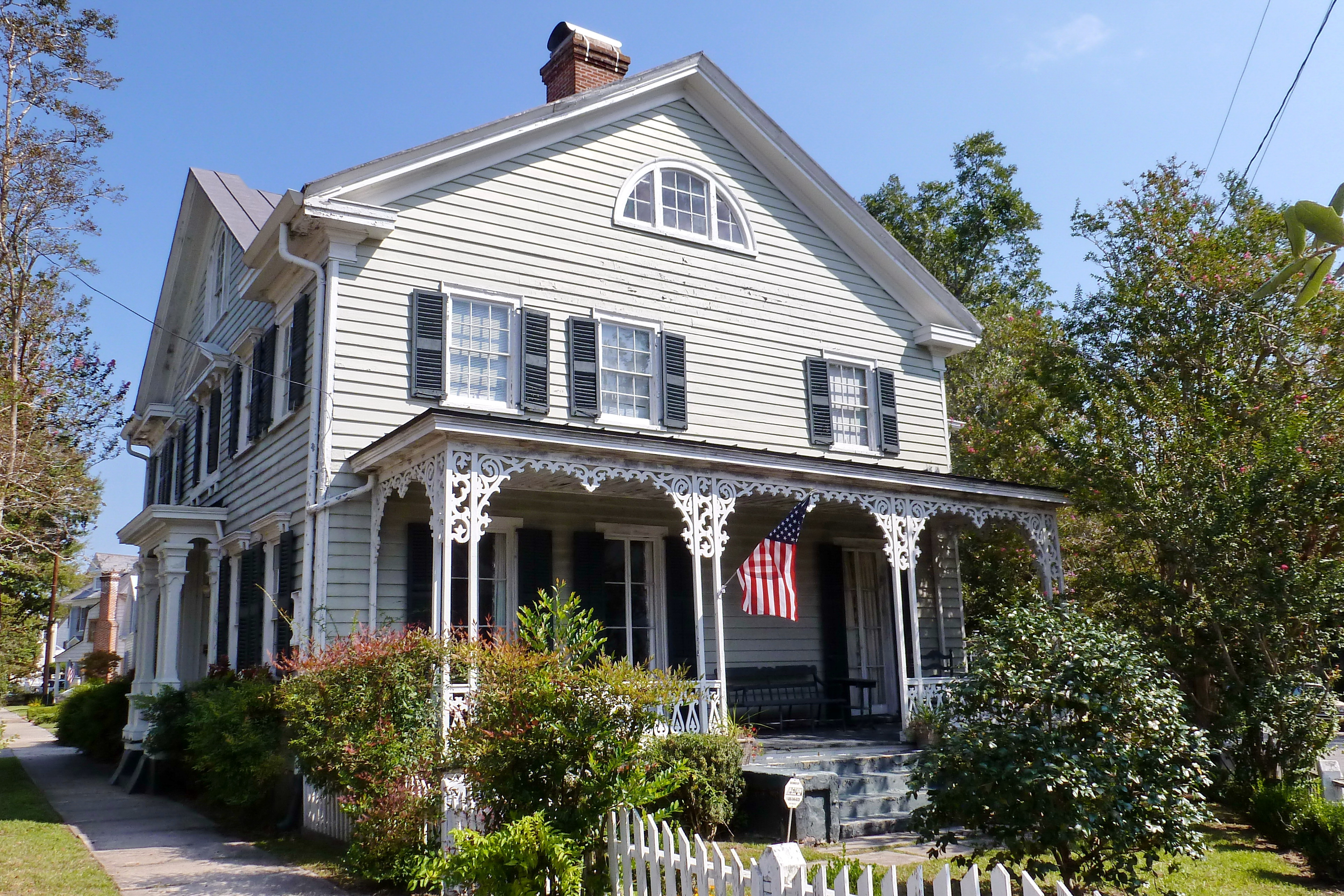
Smith-Whitford House

Coor was probably born in England before 1737. He was invited by Thomas Webber of Maryland to come to Maryland to be a naval architect. Webber owned land in New Bern, North Carolina, where Coor ended up building a house for Webber and his house own house near Webber. This house stands today and is called the Coor-Gaston House. Coor may also have designed two other buildings in New Bern, a Masonic lodge and the New Bern Academy. These buildings were not completed until after Coors death, however. Coor was also architect of the Smith-Whitford House in New Bern.

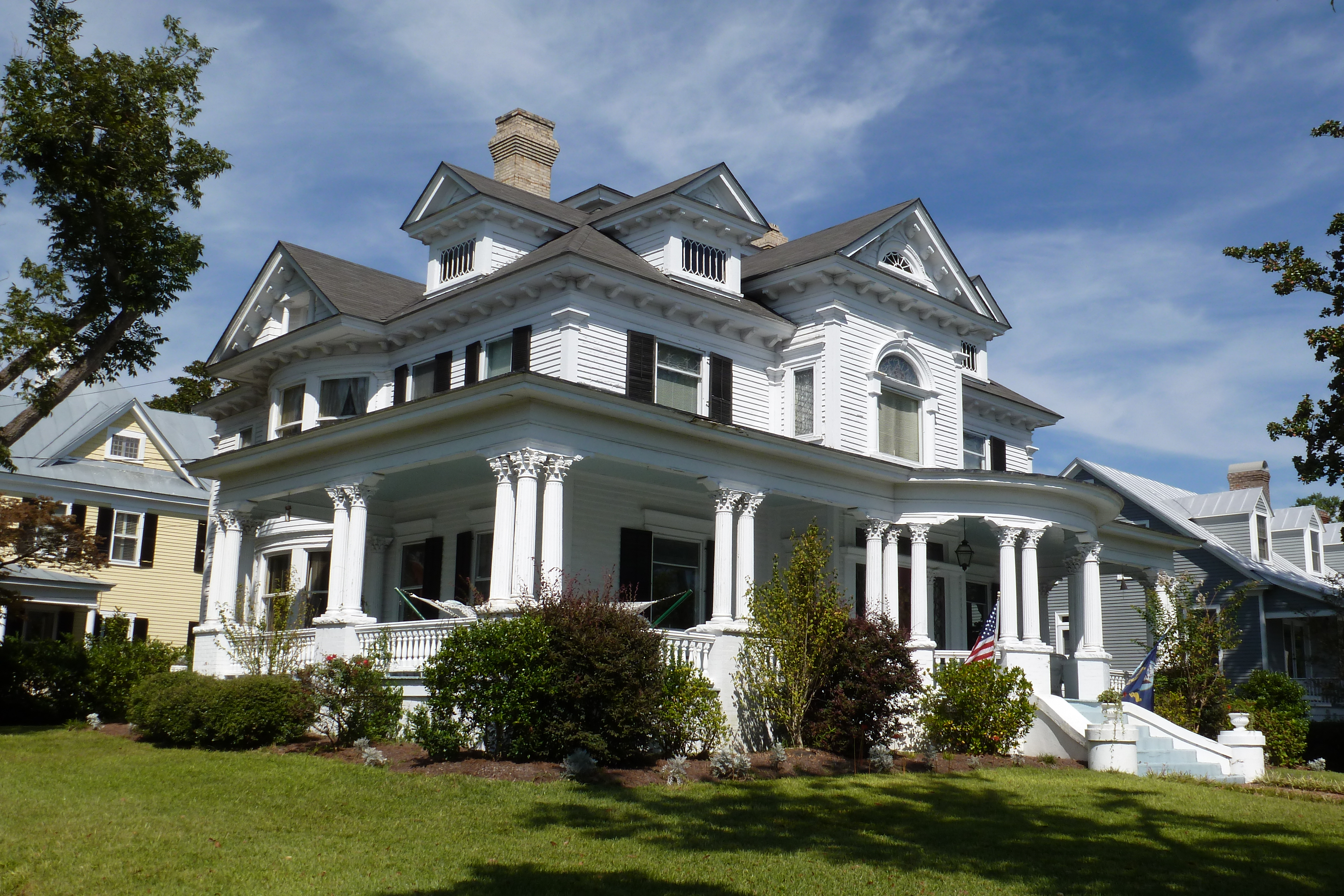
Coor-Bishop House

Coor also designed and built the Coor-Bishop House in New Bern in about 1767. As a skilled architect, Coor may also have been involved in building the Tryon Palace in New Bern.

== Political career ==
Coor served three terms representing Craven County in the Province of North Carolina House of Burgesses between 1773 and 1775. As war with Britain loomed, he served on the New Bern Council of Safety. He represented Carven County in the North Carolina Provincial Congress in the second, third, fourth and fifth sessions. He played a role in the adoption of the Halifax Resolves and in the creation of the first North Carolina State Constitution in 1776. After statehood, he represented Craven County twelve times in the North Carolina Senate of the North Carolina General Assembly between 1777 and 1787, serving as Speaker in 1786–1787.

There is no evidence that James Coor served in the militia during the American Revolution. He was on a committee to develop regulations for the militia during the Halifax Provincial Congress. There are several pay vouchers to James Coor, esquire, for services during the Revolution. There is a letter from James Coor to George Washington written in 1790. In this letter, he states that he was a naval officer for the port of Beaufort.

== Death ==
James Coor died on December 28, 1796, as noted in the New Bern North Carolina Gazette on December 31, 1796. James was a slave owner. He emancipated two of his slaves in his will.
