= Fifth North Carolina Provincial Congress =

1776 meeting in Halifax, North Carolina

←	4th	1st General Assembly	→
- Continental Union Flag

Overview
- Legislative body: North Carolina Provincial Congress
- Jurisdiction: North Carolina
- Meeting place: Halifax Court House
- Term: November 12, 1776 – December 23, 1776

Provincial Congress
- Members: 187 delegates
- President: Richard Caswell
- Vice President: Cornelius Harnett

The Fifth North Carolina Provincial Congress or 1st North Carolina Constitutional Convention was the fifth and final meeting of the North Carolina Provincial Congress. Composed of 187 delegates from 35 counties and ten towns, it met at the court house in Halifax from November 12 to December 23, 1776, in the first year of American independence. Richard Caswell of Dobbs County was unanimously chosen as president, and Cornelius Harnett of Brunswick County as vice president.

== History ==
=== Resolutions ===
This fifth provincial congress approved the first state constitution and a "Declaration of Rights" on December 18, 1776. It chose Richard Caswell as acting governor until the first General Assembly elected a state governor to replace Josiah Martin. The congress dealt extensively with raising a militia of 5,000 men to defend North Carolina. They also dealt with the ongoing Cherokee War taking place in the western part of the state.

=== Delegates ===
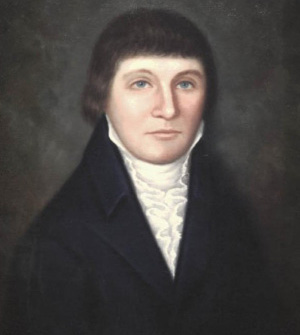
Richard Caswell

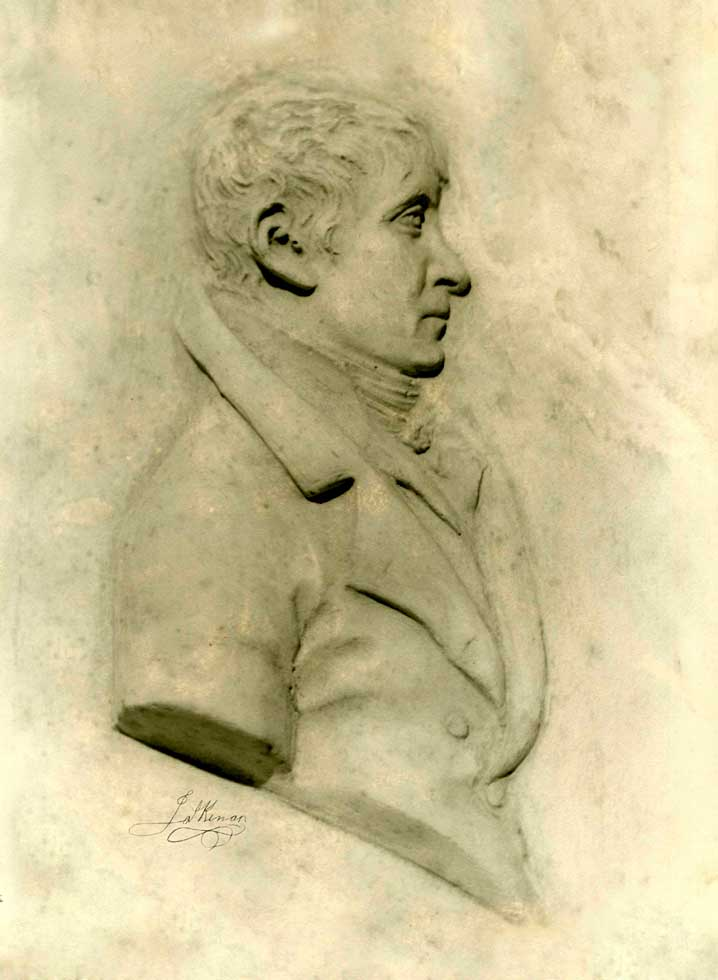
James Kenan

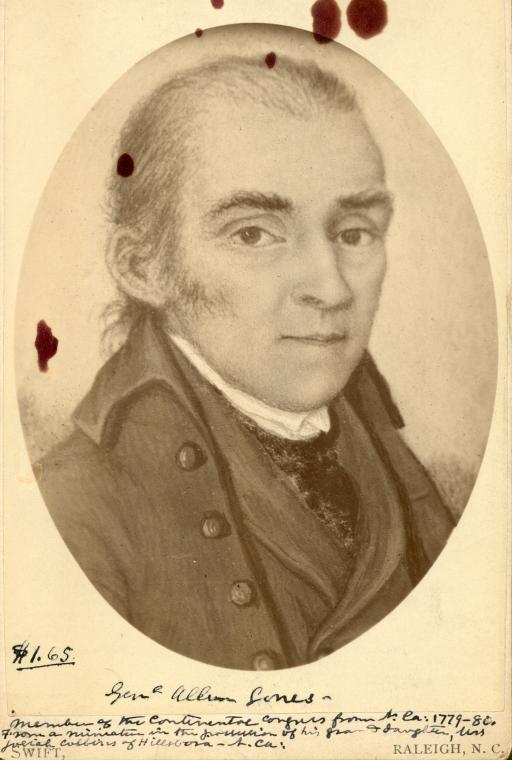
Allen Jones

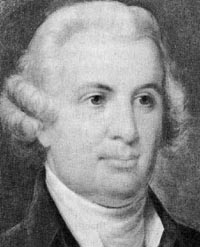
William Hooper

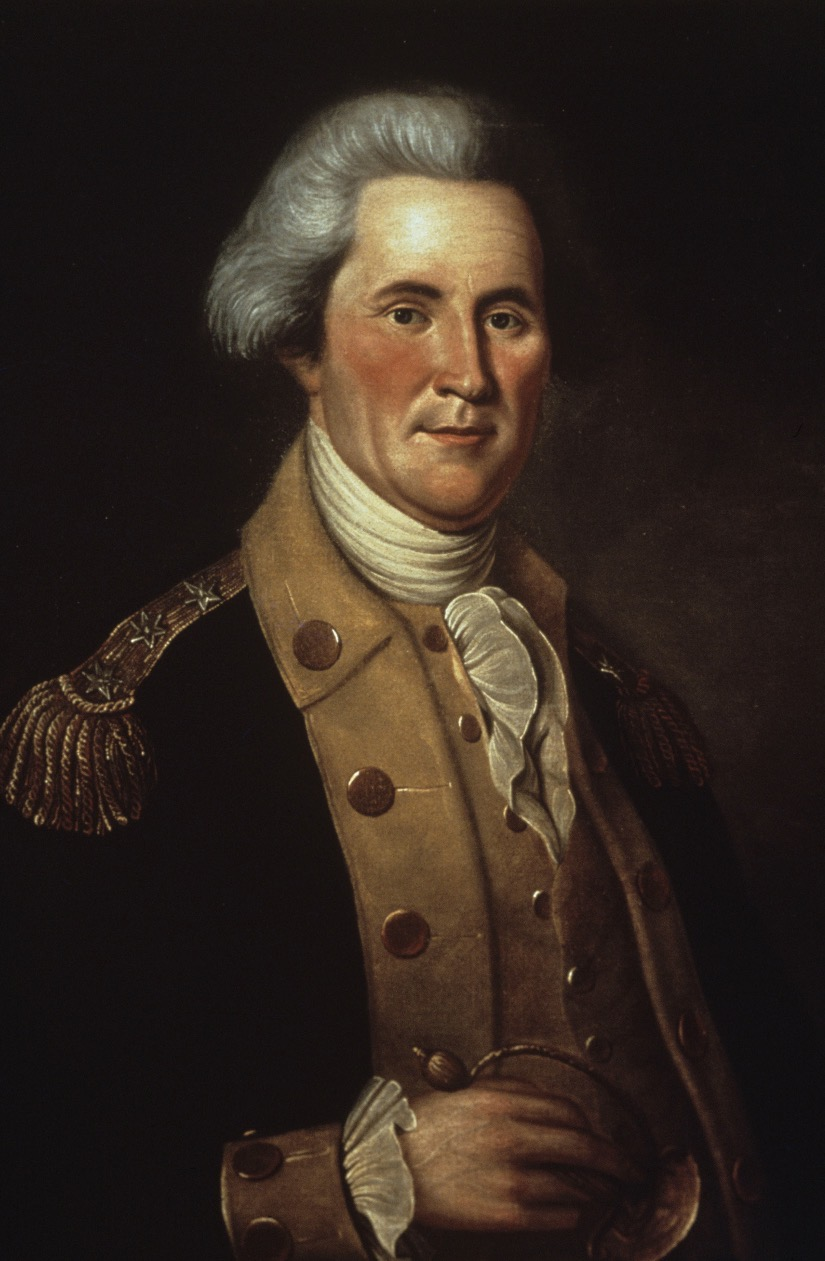
John Sevier

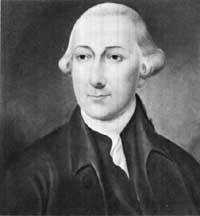
Joseph Hewes

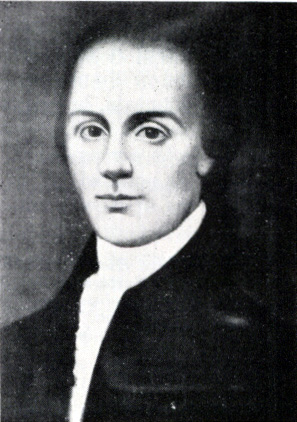
AbnerNash

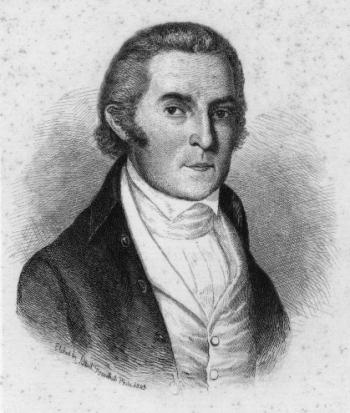
Willie Jones

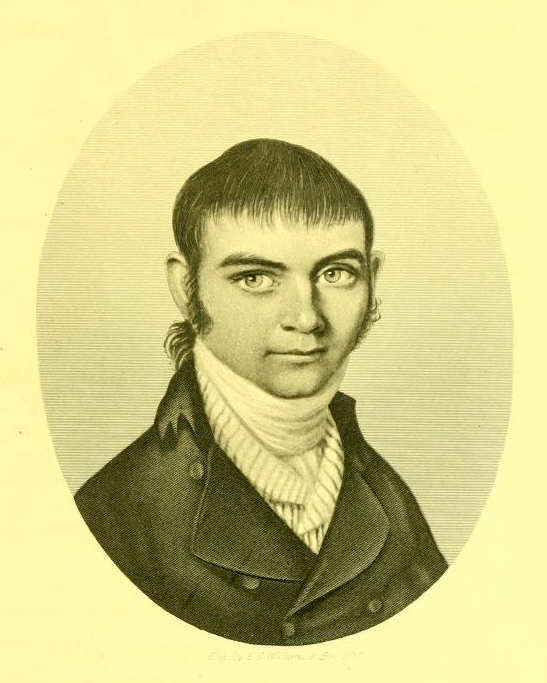
Thomas Amis, Halifax County

Each county was authorized five delegates to this congress. Some counties only had four delegates. In addition, nine districts or borough towns were also authorized a single delegate. These districts were the larger towns and population centers of the state. The concept of district representation was a hold over from the Province of North Carolina in colonial times. Washington District, in the western end of the state and later became a county, elected four delegates to the congress.

The following is a full list of delegates to the fifth congress by constituency.

Constituency	Name
Anson County	George Davidson
Anson County	David Love
Anson County	William R. Pickett
Anson County	Charles Robertson
Anson County	Thomas Wade
Beaufort County	John Barrow
Beaufort County	Francis Jones
Beaufort County	Thomas Respess
Beaufort County	Thomas Respess, Jr.
Beaufort County	Robert Tripp
Bertie County	William Gray
Bertie County	Noah Hinton
Bertie County	John Johnston
Bertie County	Thomas Pugh
Bertie County	Zedekiah Stone
Bladen County	Thomas Amis
Bladen County	James Council
Bladen County	Thomas Owen
Bladen County	Thomas Robeson
Brunswick County	Lewis Dupree
Brunswick County	Cornelius Harnett
Brunswick County	William Lord
Brunswick County	Archibald MacLaine
Brunswick County	Maurice Moore
Bute County	James Denton
Bute County	Thomas Eaton
Bute County	Philemon Hawkins
Bute County	Benjamin Seawell
Bute County	Benjamin Ward
Carteret County	William Borden
Carteret County	Brice Williams
Carteret County	Thomas Chadwick
Carteret County	John Easton
Carteret County	Soloman Shepard
Chatham County	John Birdsong
Chatham County	Mial Scurlock
Chatham County	Jeduthan Harper
Chatham County	Isaiah Hogan
Chatham County	Ambrose Ramsey
Chowan County	Thomas Benbury
Chowan County	Jacob Hunter
Chowan County	James Blount
Chowan County	Thomas Jones
Chowan County	Luke Sumner
Craven County	Nathan Bryan
Craven County	John Tillman
Craven County	William Bryan
Craven County	James Coor
Craven County	Christopher Neale
Cumberland County	William Rand
Cumberland County	Philip Alston
Cumberland County	Robert Cobb
Cumberland County	Robert Rowan
Currituck County	James White
Currituck County	Samuel Jarvis
Currituck County	Kedar Merchant
Currituck County	Hollowell Williams
Currituck County	Thomas Williams
Dobbs County	Andrew Bass
Dobbs County	Benjamin Exum
Dobbs County	Simon Bright
Dobbs County	Richard Caswell
Dobbs County	Abraham Sheppard
Duplin County	James Gillespie
Duplin County	William Dickson
Duplin County	Thomas Gray
Duplin County	James Kenan
Duplin County	William Taylor
Edgecombe County	Elisha Battle
Edgecombe County	William Haywood
Edgecombe County	William Horn
Edgecombe County	Jonas Johnston
Edgecombe County	Isaac Sessums
Granville County	Memucan Hunt
Granville County	Robert Lewis
Granville County	John Oliver
Granville County	Thornton Yancey
Granville County	Thomas Person
Guilford County	Isham Browder
Guilford County	Charles Bruce
Guilford County	David Caldwell
Guilford County	Ralph Gorrell
Guilford County	Joseph Hinds
Halifax County	Willis Alston
Halifax County	John Bradford
Halifax County	James Hogun (Note: James Hogun resigned his position after being commissioned in the North Carolina Line, and was replaced by Egbert Haywood.)
Halifax County	Egbert Haywood
Halifax County	Benjamin McCullough
Halifax County	Samuel Weldon
Hertford County	Lawrence Baker
Hertford County	William Murfree (Note: Possibly the father of William Murfree)
Hertford County	Day Ridley
Hertford County	Robert Sumner
Hertford County	James Wright
Hyde County	John Jordan
Hyde County	Abraham Jones
Hyde County	Joseph Hancock
Hyde County	Benjamin Parmele
Hyde County	William Russell
Johnston County	Alexander Avery
Johnston County	Needham Bryan Jr.
Johnston County	Henry Rains
Johnston County	Samuel Smith
Johnston County	John Stevens
Martin County	Whitmell Hill
Martin County	John Hardison
Martin County	Thomas Hunter
Martin County	Samuel Smithwick
Martin County	William Williams
Mecklenburg County	Hezekiah Alexander
Mecklenburg County	Waightstill Avery
Mecklenburg County	Robert Irwin
Mecklenburg County	John Phifer
Mecklenburg County	Zaccheus Wilson
New Hanover County	John Ashe
New Hanover County	Samuel Ashe
New Hanover County	John Devane
New Hanover County	John Hollingsworth
New Hanover County	Sampson Mosely
Northampton County	Jeptha Atherton
Northampton County	Robert Peebles
Northampton County	Howell Edmunds
Northampton County	James Ingram (Note: James Ingram was commissioned in the North Carolina Line and replaced by Thomas Parker, who was elected to replace him.)
Northampton County	Thomas Parker
Northampton County	Allen Jones
Onslow County	Benajah Doty
Onslow County	Thomas Johnston
Onslow County	Henry Rhodes
Onslow County	John Spicer
Onslow County	Edward Starkey
Orange County	Thomas Burke (Note: Seated on December 16, due to voting irregularities in a first pole)
Orange County	John Atkinson
Orange County	John Butler
Orange County	John McCabe
Orange County	John McCabe
Orange County	William Moore
Orange County	Alexander Mebane
Orange County	John Paine
Orange County	Nathaniel Rochester
Orange County	James Saunders
Pasquotank County	Henry Abbot
Pasquotank County	Dempsey Burgess
Pasquotank County	Devotion Davis
Pasquotank County	Isaac Gregory
Pasquotank County	Lemuel Sawyer
Perquimans County	Benjamin Harvey
Perquimans County	Miles Harvey
Perquimans County	Thomas Harvey
Perquimans County	William Hooper
Perquimans County	William Skinner
Pitt County	George Evans
Pitt County	James Gorham
Pitt County	Benjamin May
Pitt County	William Robson
Pitt County	Edward Salter
Rowan County	John Brevard
Rowan County	Matthew Locke
Rowan County	Griffith Rutherford
Rowan County	William Sharpe
Rowan County	James Smith
Surry County	Charles Gordon
Surry County	William Hall
Surry County	Robert Lanier
Surry County	Joseph Williams
Tryon County	John Barber
Tryon County	Robert Abernathy
Tryon County	William Alston
Tryon County	William Graham
Tryon County	Joseph Hardin
Tyrrell County	Benjamin Blount
Tyrrell County	Jeremiah Frazier
Tyrrell County	Stephen Lee
Tyrrell County	Isham Webb
Tyrrell County	Peter Wynn
Wake County	Britain Fuller
Wake County	James Jones (Note: James Jones was deemed ineligible due to service in the Light Horse. He resigned his commission on October 25, 1776 and was re-elected to serve in the congress.)
Wake County	Tignal Jones
Wake County	John Rice (Note: The Congress Journal shows that it was John Rice as delegate for Wake County. William Brown was the delegate for Bath. This appears to be an error in the Lewis delegate listing.)
Wake County	Michael Rogers
Washington District	John Carter
Washington District	John Haile
Washington District	Charles Robertson
Washington District	John Sevier
Town of Bath	William Brown
Town of Brunswick	Parker Quince
Town of Campbelton	Thomas Hadley
Town of Edenton	Joseph Hewes
Town of Halifax	Willie Jones
Town of Hillsborough	William Johnston
Town of Newbern	Abner Nash
Town of Salisbury	David Nesbitt
Town of Wilmington	William Hooper
