= 1776 in the Thirteen Colonies =

- Decades: 1770s; 1780s; 1790s
- See also: 1776 in the Thirteen Colonies; History of the United States (1776–1789); Timeline of the American Revolution; List of years in the United States

In the first half of 1776, the Thirteen Colonies individually declared independence from the British Empire. On July 4, the Declaration of Independence marked the beginning of the United States.

== Incumbents ==
- President of the Second Continental Congress: John Hancock

== Events ==
=== January ===
- January 1
  - The 3rd New Jersey Regiment is raised at Elizabethtown, New Jersey.
  - American Revolution: Burning of Norfolk.
  - The 22nd Continental Regiment is formed.
- January 2 – The Tory Act of 1776 is signed by Peyton Randolph.
- January 10 – Thomas Paine publishes Common Sense.
- January 20 – American Revolution: South Carolina Loyalists led by Robert Cunningham, signed a petition from prison agreeing to all demands for peace by the newly formed state government of South Carolina.
- January 24
  - American Revolution: Henry Knox arrives at Cambridge, Massachusetts, with the artillery that he has transported from Fort Ticonderoga.
  - American Revolution: The Continental Congress writes the third and final letter to the inhabitants of Canada urging Quebec to join the revolution.
- January 28 – The Annapolis Convention changes to the Assembly of Freeman.

=== February ===
- February 27 – American Revolution: Battle of Moore's Creek Bridge: North Carolina Loyalists charge across Moore's Creek bridge near Wilmington to attack what they mistakenly believe to be a small force of rebels. Several loyalist leaders are killed in the ensuing battle. The patriot victory virtually ends all British authority in the town.
- February 29 – The Boston News-Letter ceased publication.

=== March ===
- March 2–3 – American Revolution: Battle of the Rice Boats: Following the British seizure of rice from merchant ships on the Savannah River, militia from Georgia and South Carolina attack the British squadron on the river using fire ships.
- March 3–4 – Raid of Nassau.
- March 4 – American Revolution: The Americans capture "Dorchester Heights" dominating the port of Boston, Massachusetts.
- March 7 – The 1st and 2nd Maryland Regiments are organized.
- March 17 – American Revolution: Threatened by Patriot cannons on Dorchester Heights, the British evacuate Boston.
- March 26 – Henry Laurens ends as the President of the South Carolina Committee on Safety and becomes the Vice President of South Carolina.
- March 27 – The 3rd, 4th and 6th Maryland Regiments are organized.
- March 28 – Juan Bautista de Anza finds the site for the Presidio of San Francisco.

=== April ===
- April 3 – Nicholas Cooke is elected the 1st Governor of Rhode Island.
- April 4 – the first session of the Fourth North Carolina Provincial Congress meets in Halifax, North Carolina with Samuel Johnston as president and Allen Jones as vice president.
- April 11 – Jonathan Trumbull elected the 16th governor of Connecticut.
- April 12 – American Revolution: The Royal Colony of North Carolina produces the Halifax Resolves making it the first British colony to officially authorize its Continental Congress delegates to vote for independence from the Kingdom of Great Britain.
- April 15 – Archibald Bulloch is sworn in as the first governor of Georgia.

=== May ===
- May – The German Battalion is authorized.
- May 4
  - American Revolution: Rhode Island becomes the first American colony to renounce allegiance to King George III of Great Britain.
  - The Edenton, Halifax, Hillsborough, New Bern, Salisbury and Wilmington District Brigades are established by the North Carolina Provincial Congress.
- May 6 – The Fifth Virginia Convention is first held at Williamsburg.
- May 14 – The first session of the Fourth North Carolina Provincial Congress ends.
- May 15 – American Revolution: The Continental Congress passes John Adams' preamble, explaining why a declaration of independence was being proposed. The Lee Resolution of independence is first brought before Congress.

=== June ===
June 28: The United States Declaration of Independence is presented to the Congress

- June 7 – American Revolution: Richard Henry Lee of Virginia proposes to the Continental Congress the Lee Resolution that "these united colonies are, and of right ought to be, free and independent states."
- June 8
  - American Revolution: Battle of Trois-Rivières: American invaders are driven back at Trois-Rivières, Quebec.
  - Lee's Legion is raised at Williamsburg, Virginia.
- June 11 – American Revolution: The Continental Congress appoints the Committee of Five to draft the Declaration of Independence. The principal draft will be written by Thomas Jefferson.
- June 12 – American Revolution: Virginia Declaration of Rights by George Mason adopted by the Virginia Convention of Delegates.
- June 15 – American Revolution: Delaware Separation Day: The Delaware General Assembly votes to suspend government under the British Crown.
- June 17
  - Lt. Jose Joaquin Moraga leads a band of colonists from Monterey Presidio, landing on June 29 and, with Father Francisco Palóu, constructing the Mission San Francisco de Asís ("Mission Dolores") of the new Presidio of San Francisco, the oldest surviving building in the modern-day city.
  - The Maryland and Virginia Rifle Regiment is organized.
- June 18 – The Pennsylvania Provincial Conference begins at Carpenters' Hall in Philadelphia.
- June 25 – The Pennsylvania Provincial Conference ends at Carpenters' Hall in Philadelphia.
- June 28
  - American Revolution: The Committee of Five presents their United States Declaration of Independence to the Continental Congress, which begins a further revision process, removing reference to slavery.
  - Battle of Sullivan's Island.
  - Thomas Hickey becomes the first person executed by the Continental Army for mutiny, sedition, and treachery.
- June 29
  - American Revolution: Battle of Turtle Gut Inlet – The Continental Navy successfully challenges the British Royal Navy blockade off Cape May County, New Jersey.
  - The Constitution of Virginia is first adopted with Patrick Henry elected its first governor defeating Thomas Nelson Jr..

=== July ===
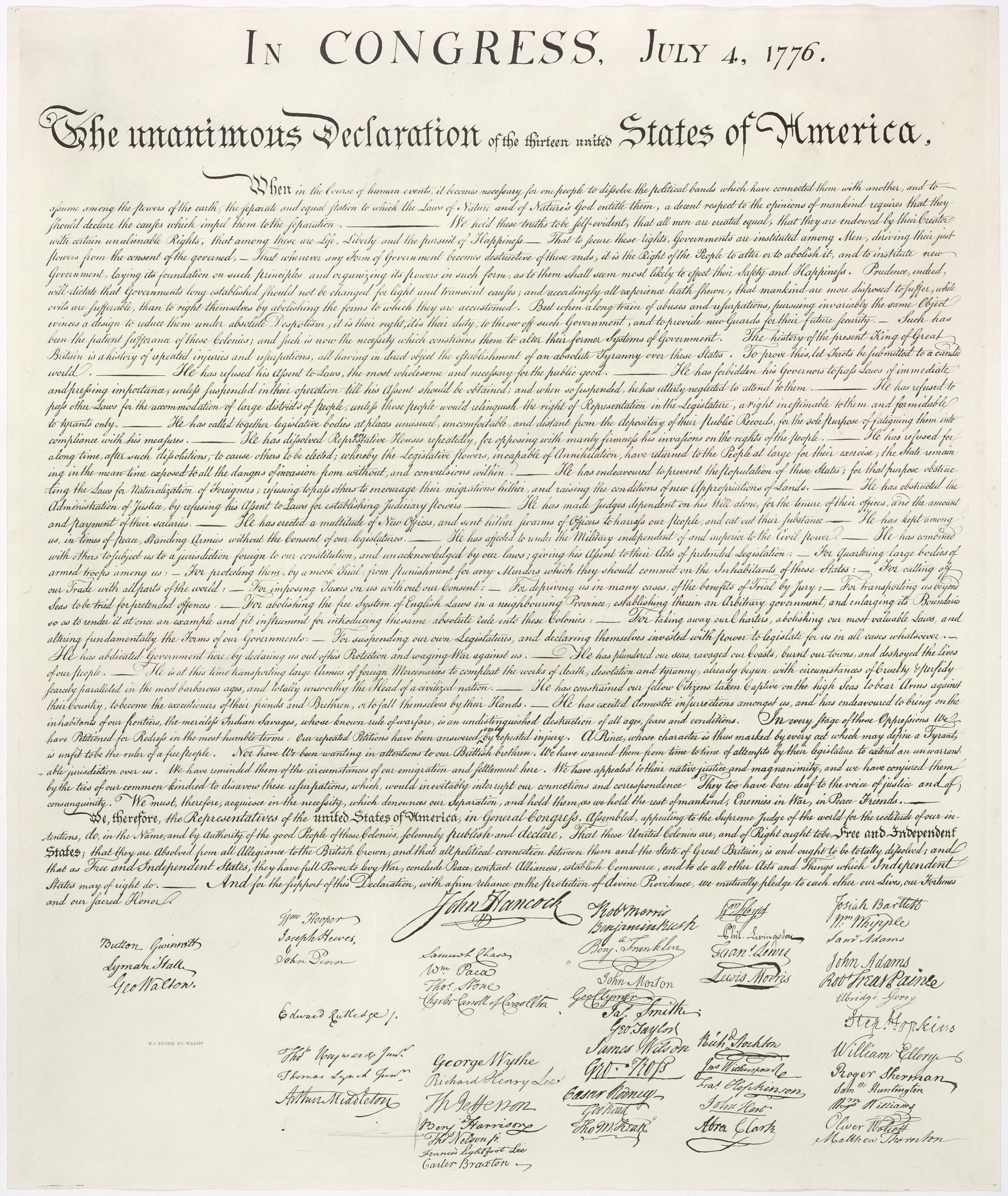
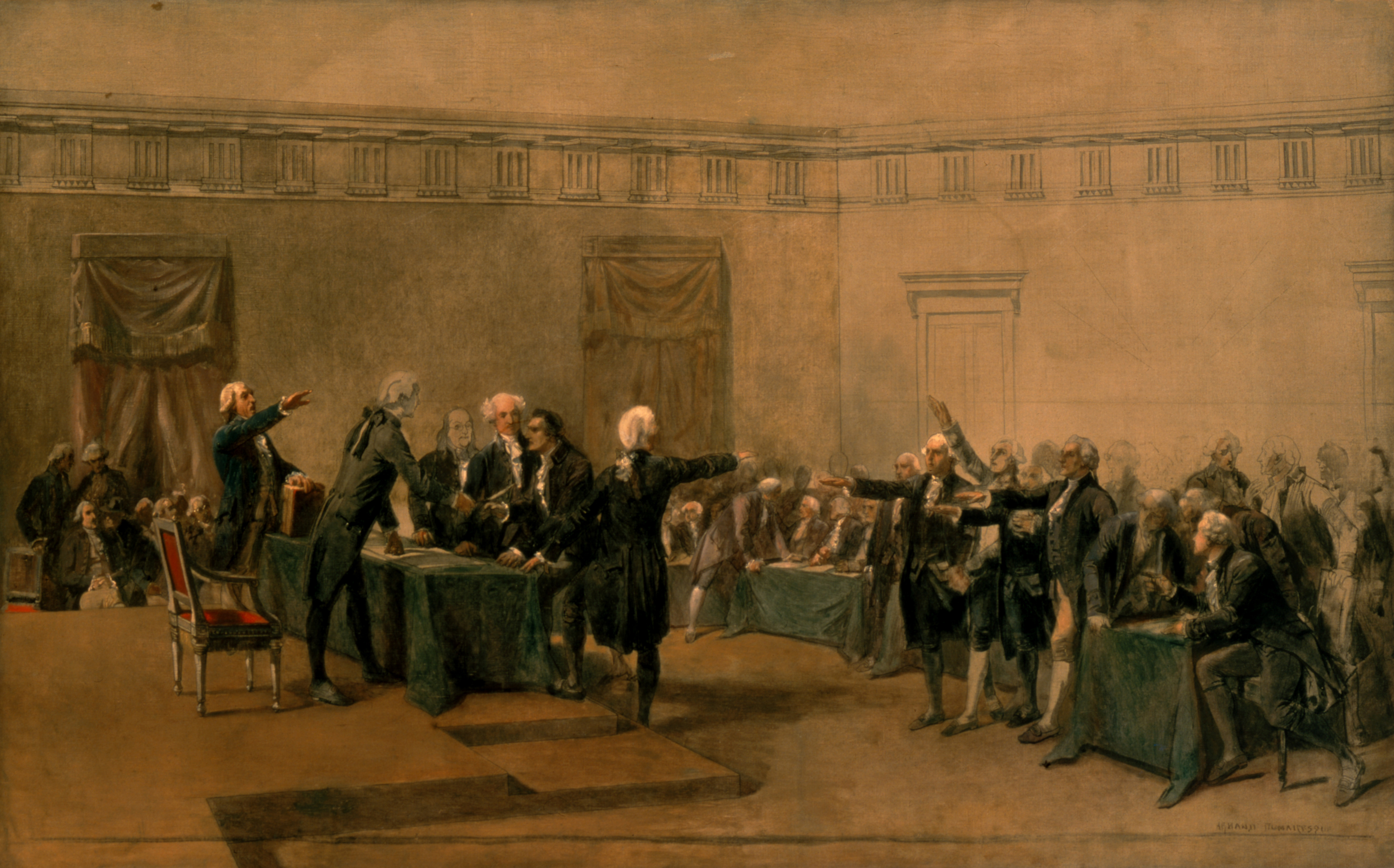
July 4: United States Declaration of Independence
- July 1 – American Revolution: Congress sitting as a committee of the whole votes in favor of independence.
- July 2 – American Revolution: The final (despite minor revisions) U.S. Declaration of Independence is written. The full Continental Congress passes the Lee Resolution.
- July 3 – American Revolution: British troops first land on Staten Island, which will become the longest occupied land for the duration of the conflict.
- July 4 – American Revolution: The United States Declaration of Independence, in which the United States officially declares independence from the British Empire, is approved by the Continental Congress and signed by its president, John Hancock, together with representatives from Connecticut, Delaware, Georgia, Maryland, Massachusetts Bay, New Hampshire, New Jersey, New York, North Carolina, Pennsylvania, Rhode Island, South Carolina and Virginia.

=== Undated ===
- The Maryland Court of Appeals now the Supreme Court of Maryland is founded by Article 56 of the Maryland Constitution of 1776.
- Fort Clinton is erected by the Continental Army west bank of the Hudson River.
- Fort Defiance is constructed by Nathanael Greene.
- Fort Salonga is built in Fort Salonga, New York.
- Peter Van Brugh Livingston is appointed by the New York Provincial Congress as the first New York State Treasurer.
- Brunswick Town, North Carolina is attacked by British soldiers of the Royal Navy ship Cruizer and burns most of the town including St. Philip's Church.
- Henry Robason settles in the location that will become Robersonville, North Carolina.
- Forks of the Tar changes to Washington, North Carolina naming it in honor of George Washington.
- Thoughts on Government is written by John Adams.
- The Continental Powder Works at French Creek is constructed.
- Crawford Township, Pennsylvania is settled.
- The Dobbin House Tavern is built in the location now to be Gettysburg, Pennsylvania.
- The Seal of South Carolina is adopted.
- The Boston Caucus dissolves.
- Garnet Fort later to be Fort Andrew is built.
- Fort Revere is first fortified by Patriot forces.
- Gill, Massachusetts is first settled.
- Hancock, Massachusetts is incorporated named after John Hancock.
- The Independent Chronicle publishes its first issue.
- North Cemetery is built in Leverett, Massachusetts.
- The House of Burgesses comes to an end.
- Fort Nelson is constructed by Virginia's Revolutionary government.
- Fort Randolph is built in Point Pleasant, Virginia.
- Kentucky County, Virginia is founded.
- Washington County, Virginia is formed by Virginians and named after George Washington.
- The Pennsylvania Provincial Council dissolves.
- The 20th Continental Regiment is established.
- Lookout Place is constructed by British Regulars.

== Births ==
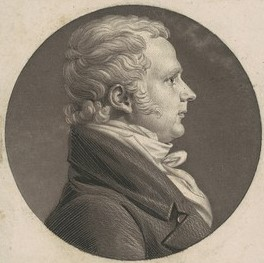
James M. Broom

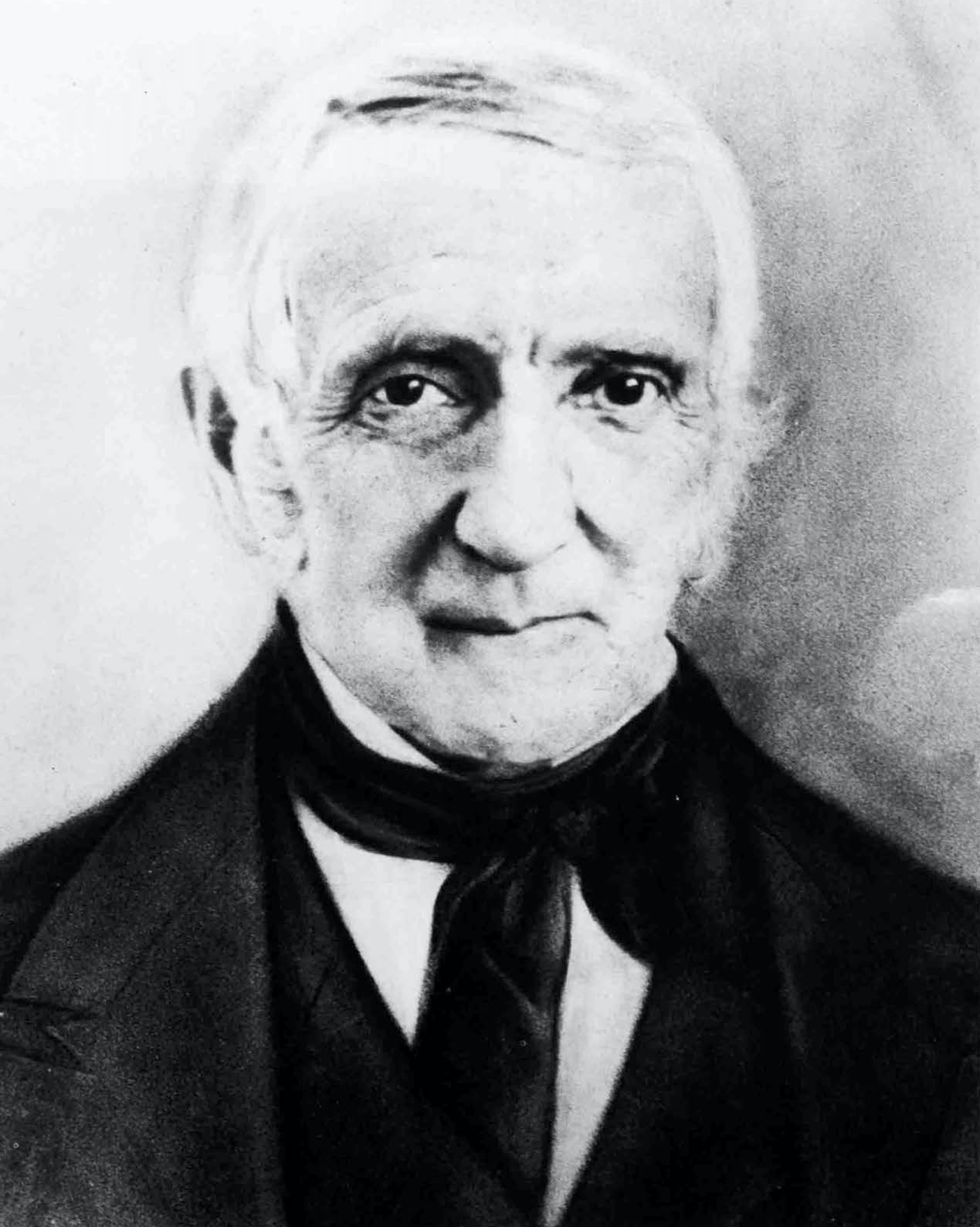
Jeremiah Chaplin

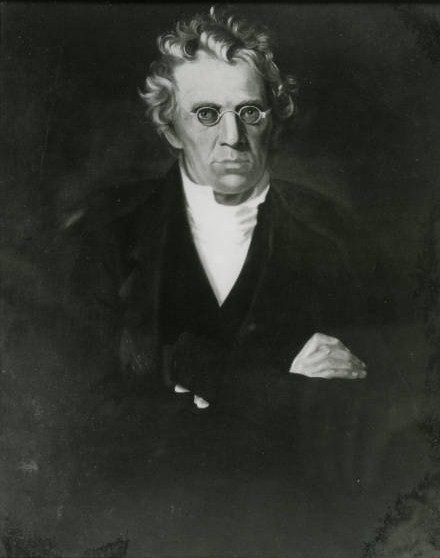
Matthew Brown

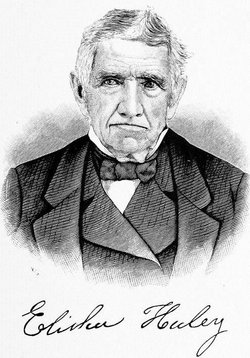
Elisha Haley

Peter Augustus Jay

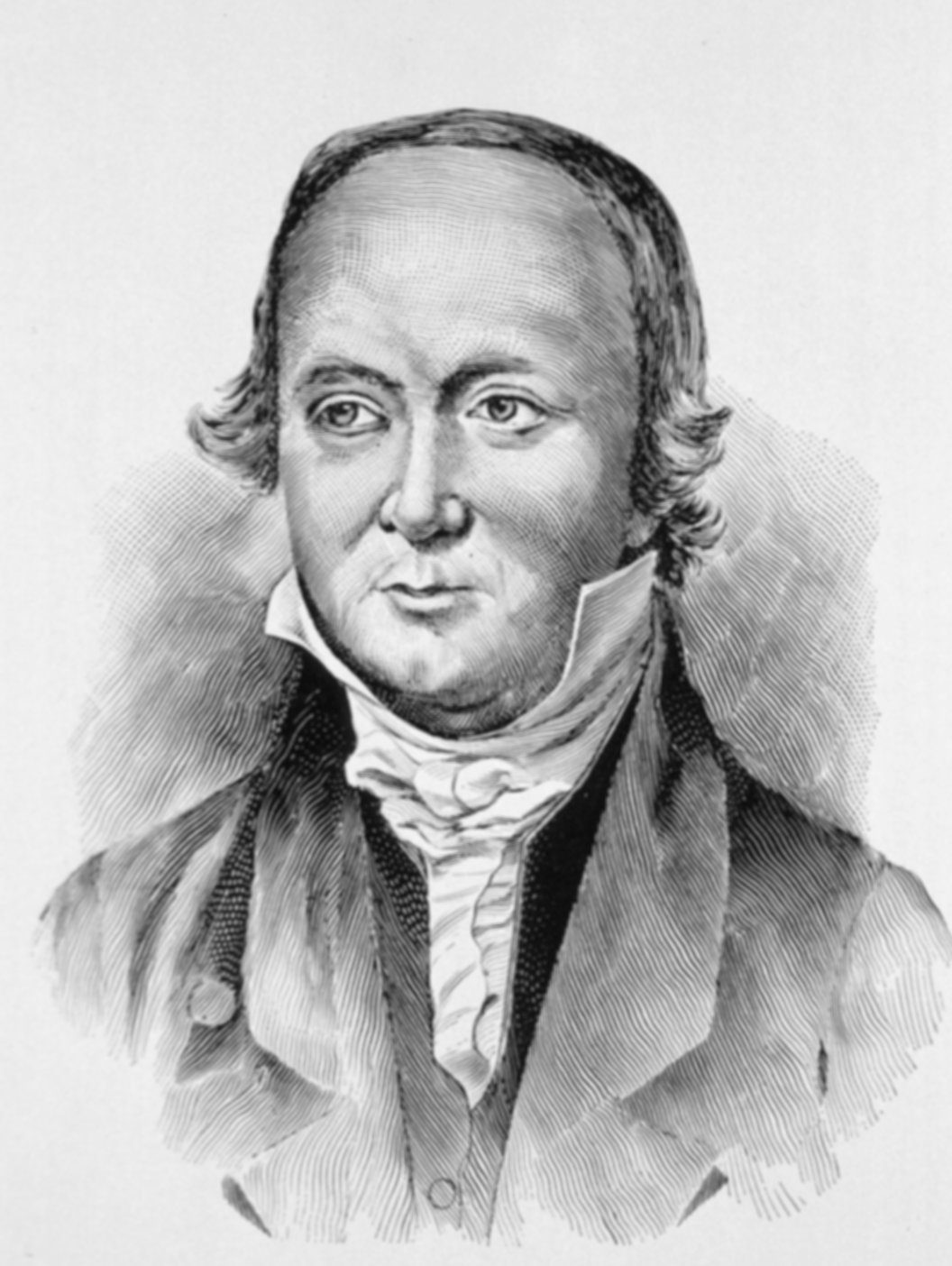
Gerard Troost

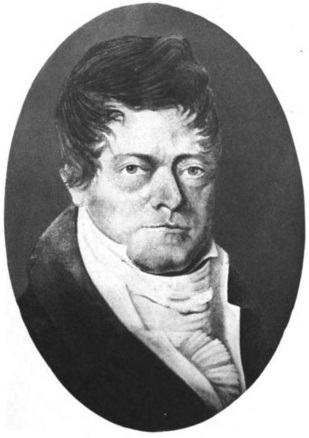
David Rogerson Williams

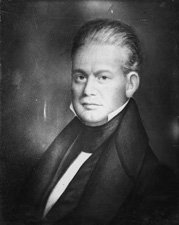
Jesse Bledsoe

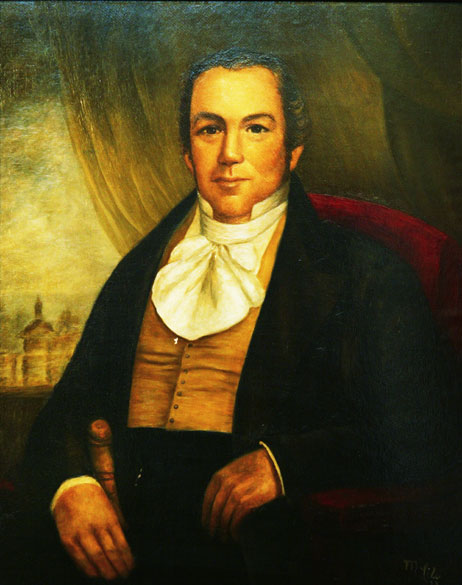
James Miller

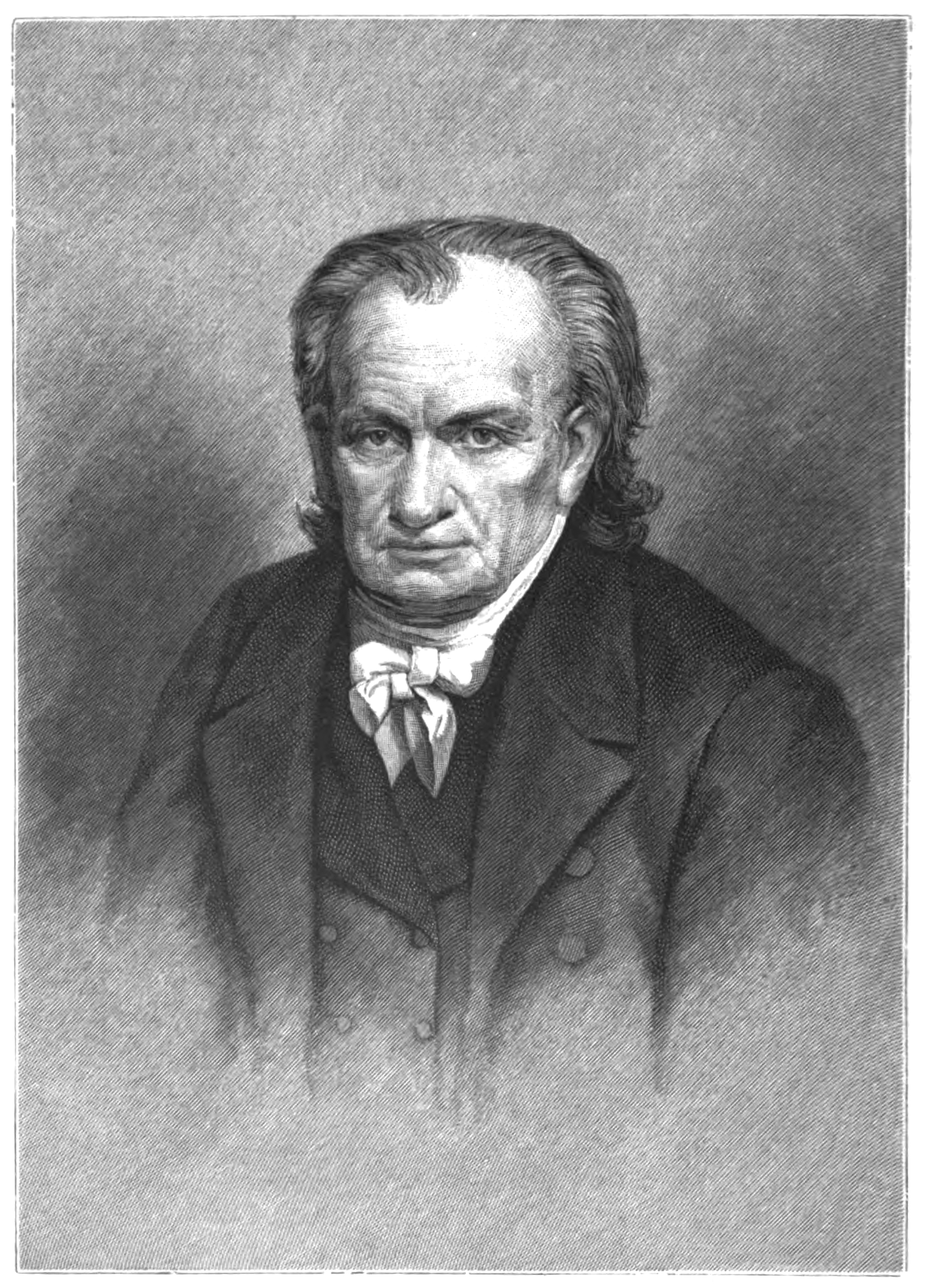
Amos Eaton

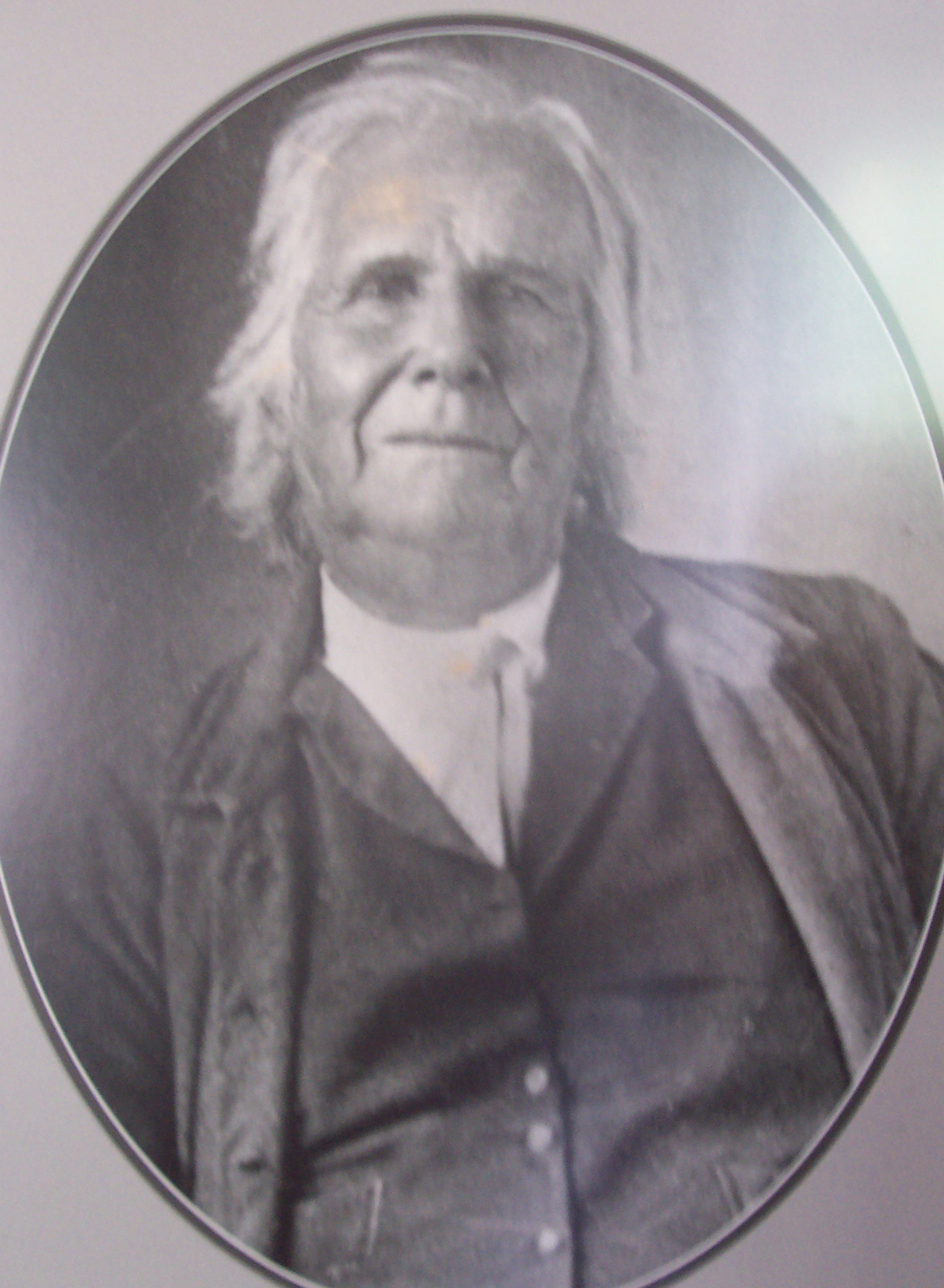
Dennis Pennington

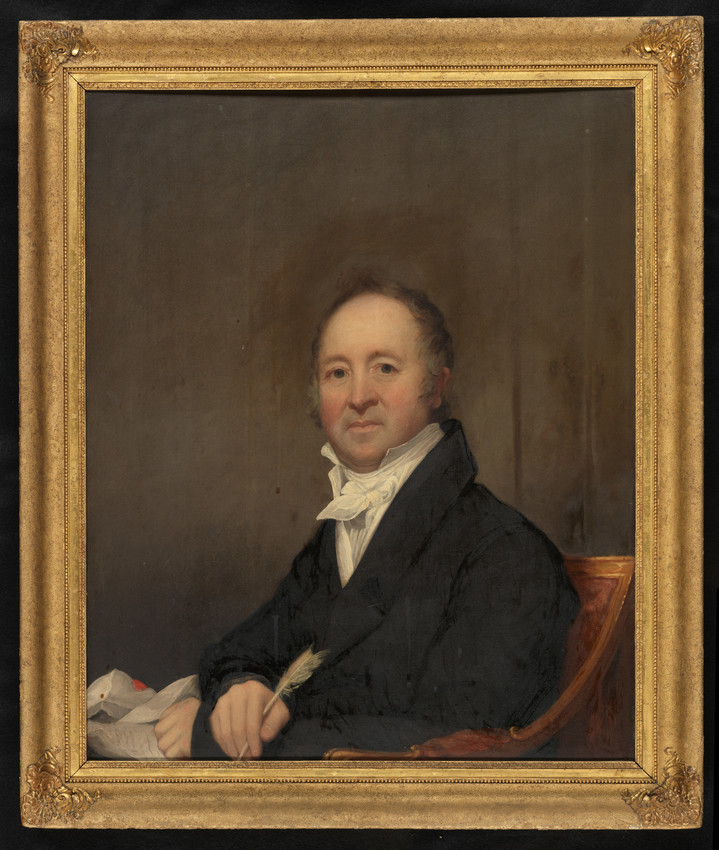
William Reed

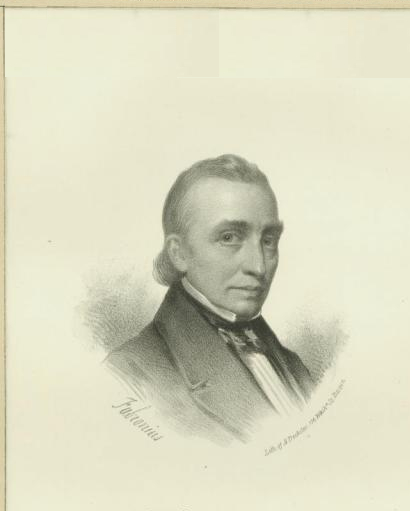
Stephen Longfellow

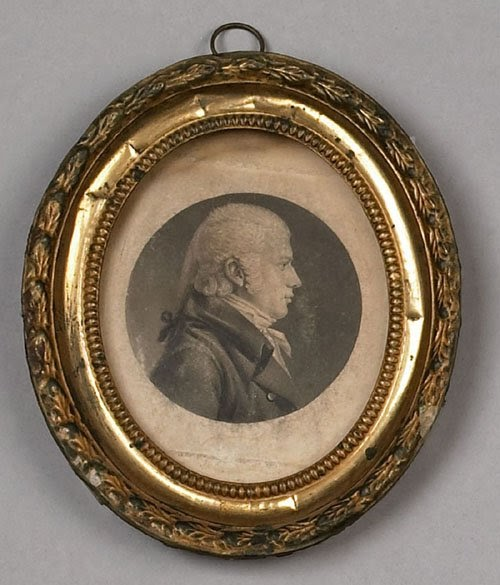
Samuel Thatcher
- January 1 – James M. Broom, politician (died 1850)
- January 2 – Jeremiah Chaplin, Reformed Baptist theologian (died 1841)
- January 16 – Matthew Brown, college president (died 1853)
- January 21 – Elisha Haley, politician (died 1860)
- January 24 – Peter A. Jay, politician (died 1843)
- February 26 – Innis Green, congressman for Pennsylvania (died 1839)
- March 1
  - John Collins, manufacturer and politician (died 1822)
  - Elias Moore, American-born politician (died 1847 in Canada)
- March 3 – James Parker, politician (died 1868)
- March 5 – Gerard Troost, mineralogist (died 1850)
- March 8
  - David Rogerson Williams, politician (died 1830)
  - Samuel Tweedy, politician (died 1868)
- March 17 – Joel Abbot, politician (died 1826)
- March 19 – Philemon Beecher, politician (died 1839)
- March 20 – Joshua Bates, educator (died 1854)
- April 6 – Jesse Bledsoe, U.S. senator from Kentucky from 1813 to 1814 (died 1836)
- April 25 – James Miller, politician and military general (died 1851)
- May 5 – Valentine Efner, politician (died 1865)
- May 6 – Rensselaer Westerlo, politician (died 1851)
- May 13 – Jett Thomas, militia general (died 1817)
- May 17 – Amos Eaton, naturalist and pioneer of scientific education (died 1842)
- May 18 – Dennis Pennington, politician (died 1854)
- May 31 – José Antonio de la Garza, mayor (died 1851)
- June 1 – George Schetky, violoncellist and composer (died 1831)
- June 4 – Isaac B. Van Houten, politician (died 1850)
- June 6 – William Reed, politician (died 1837)
- June 19 – Francis Johnson, congressman (died 1842)
- June 23 – Stephen Longfellow, politician (died 1849)
- July 1 – Samuel Thatcher, politician (died 1872)

== Deaths ==
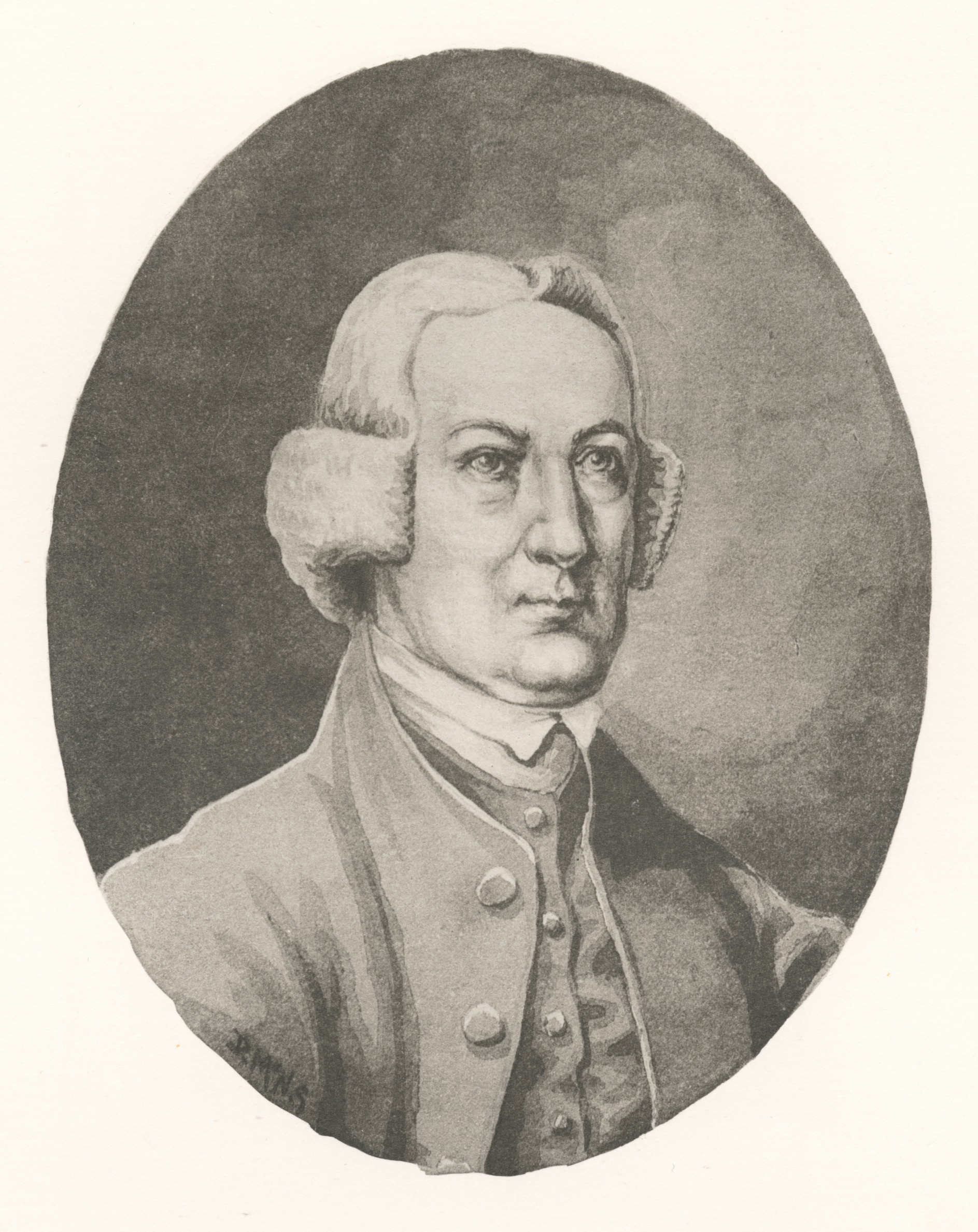
Samuel Ward

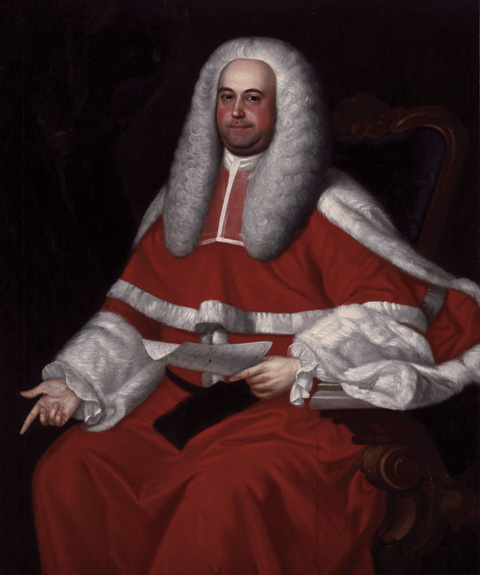
Jonathan Belcher
- March 26 – Samuel Ward, politician (born 1725)
- March 30 – Jonathan Belcher, lawyer, chief justice, and lieutenant governor of Nova Scotia (born 1710)
- June 28 – Thomas Hickey, sergeant in the Commander-in-Chief's Guard, tried and executed for mutiny and sedition (birth unknown)

== Works cited ==
- Stokes, Isaac Newton Phelps (1915–1928). The Iconography of Manhattan Island, 1498–1909. Robert H. Dodd.
