= North Carolina state troops in the American Revolution =

Military units created in early North Carolina, USA

North Carolina State Troops in the American Revolution
- Active: 1775–1783
- Allegiance: North Carolina
- Branch: State Troops

Commanders
- Notable commanders: Major General John Ashe, Sr.

North Carolina state troops in the American Revolution were the initial military units created in a transition from the Province of North Carolina under British rule to independence from British rule. Most units did not last long as such and were either transferred to the Continental Army or state militia instead.

== Leadership and units ==
The North Carolina State Troops and militia were under the command of Major General John Ashe from 1778 to 1779. Brigadier Alexander Mebane was Commissary General for the State of North Carolina with the rank of Brigadier General (1780-1783). The units of the State troops included:

=== 1st and 2nd North Carolina Regiments ===
The 1st North Carolina Regiment was created on September 1, 1775 with men from the Wilmington District and Salisbury District. Colonel James Moore was the first commander. Its transition to Continental Line was completed on July 8, 1777

The 2nd North Carolina Regiment was created on September 1, 1775. Colonel Robert Howe, Esq was the first commander. Its transition to Continental Line was completed on January 8, 1777.

=== Minuteman battalions ===
The Third North Carolina Provincial Congress (1775) authorized the creation of six battalions of "Minutemen" (also known as Minute Men) for a duration of six months. They considered the local militias as ineffective. However, the local militias were a tradition and they continued. Each Minutemen battalion was to consist of ten companies of 50 men each. The counties were to furnish one to three companies of their militia to fill the Minutemen battalions. The battalions would be trained for fourteen days and then would be mustered once per fortnight. The battalions were to be established in each of six judicial (later called military) districts and was a "standing army" paid full-time by the Province of North Carolina. The Minutemen concept did not continue past the original six-month trial. At the Battle of Moore's Creek Bridge in February 1776, the militia acquitted themselves and the General Assembly dropped the Minutemen concept in favor of Militia Brigades in each military district, instead.

- The Edenton District Minuteman Battalion was created by the Continental Congress on September 9, 1775 for six months duration. It was disbanded on April 10, 1776 in favor of Edenton District Brigade of militia instead. The Battalion was commanded by Col. Edward Vail, Sr., who was the first commander of the Edenton District Brigade. There were eight known companies in the battalion, including one headed by Captain John Pugh Williams, who would later be acting commander of the Edenton District Brigade. The battalion was engaged only once, a skirmish at Great Bridge, Virginia on December 9, 1775.
- The Halifax District Minuteman Battalion was created by the Continental Congress on September 9, 1775 for six months duration. The battalion was commanded by Colonel Nicholas Long. It was disbanded on April 10, 1776 in favor of Halifax District Brigade of militia. Colonel Long went on to become the Deputy Quartermaster General of the North Carolina Line.
- The Hillsborough District Minuteman Battalion was created by the Continental Congress on September 9, 1775 for six months duration. The battalion was commanded by Colonel James Thackston. It was disbanded on April 10, 1776 in favor of Hillsborough District Brigade of militia. Colonel Thackston became a Lieutenant Colonel in the 4th North Carolina Regiment.

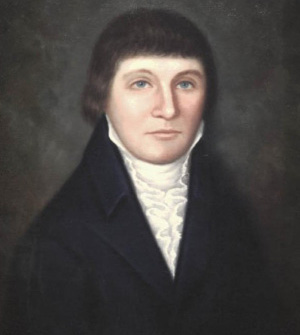
Richard Caswell

- The New Bern District Minuteman Battalion was created by the Continental Congress on September 9, 1775 for six months duration. The battalion was commanded by Colonel Richard Caswell. It was disbanded on April 10, 1776 in favor of New Bern District Brigade of militia, which was commanded by Brigadier General Richard Caswell.
- The Salisbury District Minuteman Battalion was created by the Continental Congress on September 9, 1775 for six months duration. It was commanded by Colonel Griffith Rutherford and Colonel Thomas Wade. It was disbanded on April 10, 1776 in favor of Salisbury District Brigade of militia, which was commanded by Brigadier General Griffith Rutherford. Colonel Wade became commander of the Anson County Regiment. This was the existing command structure later in the year when the Rutherford Light Horse expedition was launched against the Overmountain Cherokee.
- The 2nd Salisbury District Minuteman Battalion was created by splitting the Salisbury District Minuteman Battlation on December 21, 1775. The battalion was commanded by Colonel Thomas Polk. It was disbanded on April 10, 1776 in favor of Salisbury District Brigade of militia. Colonel Polk went on to command the 4th North Carolina Regiment and became the Commissary General for the North Carolina Line in 1780.
- The Wilmington District Minuteman Battalion was created by the Continental Congress on September 9, 1775 for six months duration. The brigade was commanded by Colone John Alexander Lillington. It was disbanded on April 10, 1776 in favor of Wilmington District Brigade of militia. Colonel Lillington went on in 1776 to command the 6th North Carolina Regiment and the Wilmington District Brigade from 1779 to 1783.

=== Light dragoons ===
The North Carolina Light Dragoons Regiment consisted of three companies authorized by the North Carolina General Assembly on April 16, 1776. It was placed under Continental Line on March 7, 1777. A fourth company was authorized in 1778. It was removed from the Continental Line on January 1, 1779 and formed the North Carolina Light Dragoons Regiment. In February 1779, it was re-established as the North Carolina Light Dragoons Regiment of State Troops under the command of Col François Malmédy. It was disbanded in late 1781. Some consider it militia.

=== Independent companies ===
Five independent companies of Provincial Troops were created on April 29, 1776. These companies were designated to protect the North Carolina coast. The companies included:

1. The Bogue Inlet Independent Company led by Captain Selby Harney (disbanded in December 1777),
2. The Cape Fear Independent Company led by Captain John King (disbanded on November 21, 1776),
3. The Core Sound Independent Company led by Captain Enoch Ward (disbanded in December 1777).
4. The Ocracoke Independent Company led by Captain James Anderson (disbanded in December 1777 but re-established on July 30, 1779 and active until the end of the war)
5. The Outer Banks Independent Company led by Captain Dennis Dauge (disbanded in December 1777).

=== Artillery companies ===
North Carolina artillery companies included:

- The 1st North Carolina Artillery Company was authorized by the North Carolina General Assembly on May 9, 1776 and led by Captain John Vance.
- The 2nd North Carolina Artillery Company was authorized by the North Carolina General Assembly on January 7, 1777 and led by Captain Thomas Clark. It was disbanded in June 1779.

These companies were placed in the North Carolina Line on July 10, 1777.

=== French Refugees Regiment ===
On April 24, 1778, the North Carolina General Assembly approved the creation of a French Refugees Regiment to be led by Colonel Monsieur Chariol DePlacer. This regiment was envisioned to include Frenchmen from North and South Carolina and the Caribbean. The regiment was disbanded on August 19, 1778, due to insufficient numbers, despite personal efforts to solicit members by Governor Richard Caswell.

=== North Carolina State Regiment ===
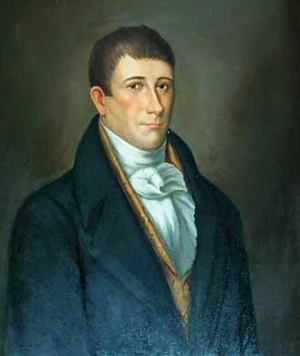
Colonel Benjamin Williams

The North Carolina General Assembly created a State Regiment (also called a State Legion) to subdue loyalists in the state with men from militia units all over the state in January 1779. The troops were to serve for terms of three months. The regiment was commanded by Colonel John Herritage. Men from this unit were not to leave the state. The unit included both infantry and cavalry. The unit was disbanded in October 1779, re-established on July 10, 1781 under colonel Col. Benjamin Williams (1781) and later Col. Joel Lewis (1781-1783), and finally disbanded on January 10, 1783.

=== North Carolina State Cavalry, Western District Regiment ===
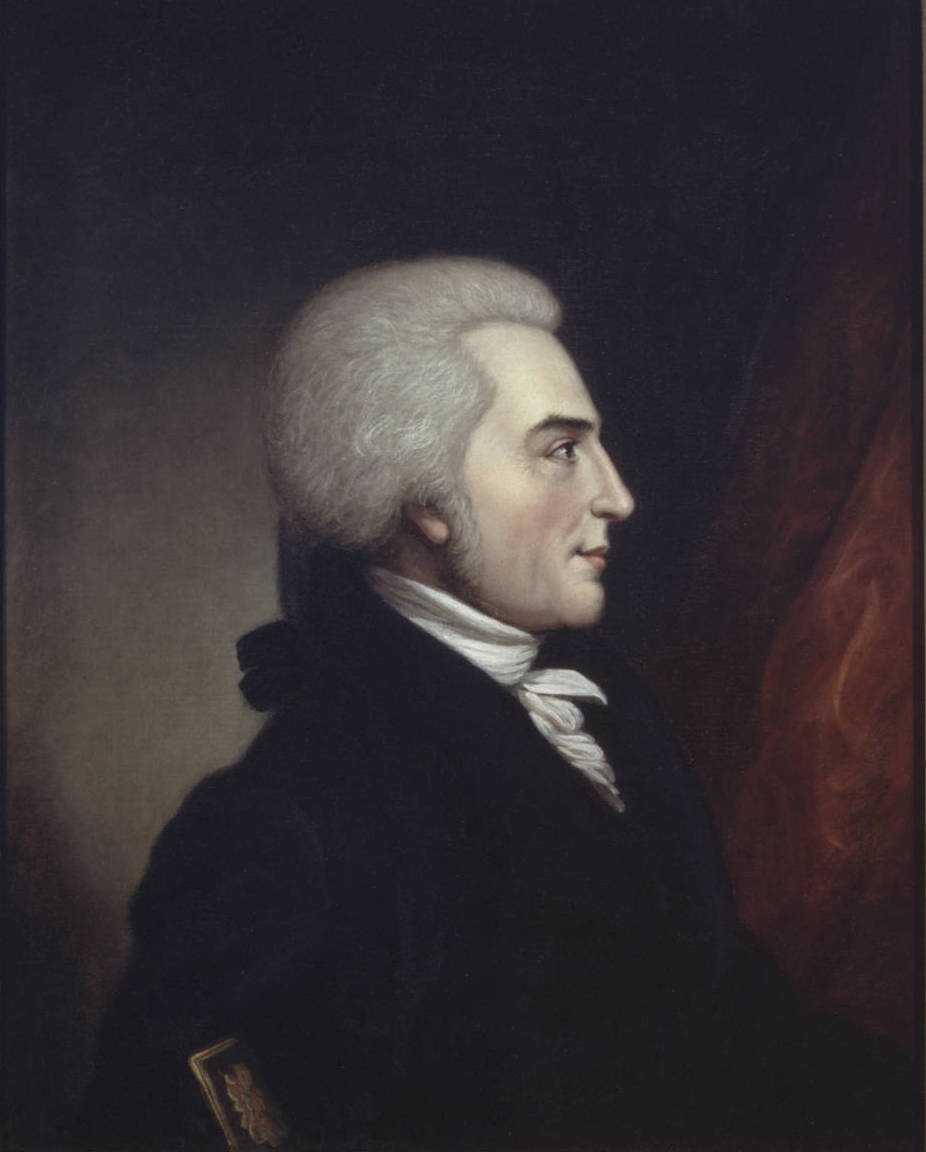
Colonel William Richardson Davie

On September 5, 1780, Colonel William Richardson Davie was given command of a new regiment of light horse in the Salisbury District of North Carolina. The North Carolina Department of War named this regiment the North Carolina Cavalry, West District Regiment. The regiment only lasted until late December 1780 or early January 1781, as the Board of War appointed Colonel Davie as Superintendent Commissary General of Provisions and Supplies for the state. The regiment did participate in several engagements: on September 21, 1780 in a pre-emptive attack on the British at Wahab's Plantation in South Carolina, on September 26, 1780 against the entire British Army as they marched into the Battle of Charlotte, and on October 9, 1780 at the skirmish at Polk's Mill in North Carolina.

Other officers in the regiment included Lieutenant Colonel DeBrisbourn, Major George Davidson, Major Joseph Dickson, Maj. James Cole Mountflorence, Maj. James Rutherford, Maj. Salter, Maj. James White, Lieutenant Mussenden Ebenezer Matthews, and Adjutant Joseph Graham.

=== North Carolina Light Horse Regiment ===
It is not known if there was actually a regiment called the light horse regiment in either the North Carolina militia or State troops. The North Carolina General Assembly resolved on February 7, 1781 to raise a new regiment of light horse from the Halifax District. It was to be led by captain James Reid with a militia rank of major and commandant. Within two weeks of this resolution Reid was promoted to colonel with a lieutenant colonel and two majors under his command. Units were added to this regiment from other parts of the state. A Guilford Dudley assumed command as a colonel in the regiment in 1781 while colonel Reid was convalescing from wounds suffered at Hobkirk's Hill in 1781.

Companies from this regiment were engaged six known battles and skirmishes: 3/15/1781, New Garden Meeting House; 3/15/1781, Battle of Guilford Court House in North Carolina; 4/25/1781, Hobkirk's Hill in South Carolina; 5/8/1781, Sawney's Creek in South Carolina; 5/13/1781, Legat's Bridge in North Carolina; and 9/12/1781, skirmish in Hillsborough, North Carolina. Colonel Reid and Governor Thomas Burke were captured at the skirmish in Hillsborough, along with hundreds of their soldiers.

=== North Carolina State Legion Regiment ===
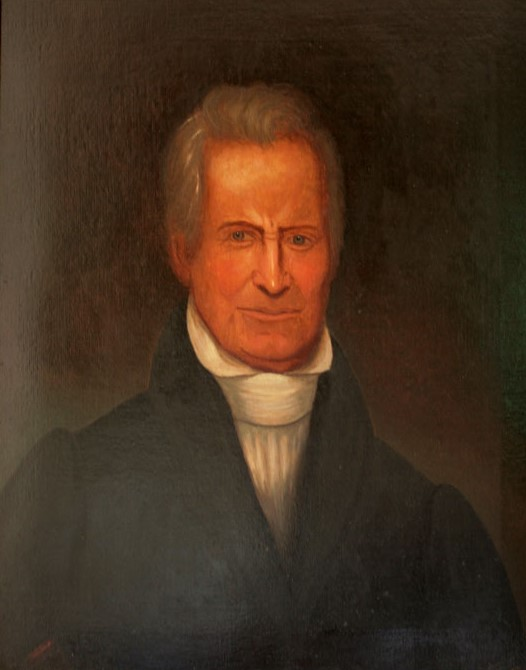
Joseph Graham

On October 7, Brigadier General Griffith Rutherford appointed Joseph Graham, formerly a Captain from Mecklenburg County, to be a Major in Col. Robert Smith's "legionary corps in my brigade", according to Rutherford. Historians differ on whether this unit was North Carolina State Troops or Militia. The argument in favor of being a State Troop is that the members of the unit were from all over North Carolina and not just one military district or county. Components of this unit were engaged at the following battles and skirmishes:

- October 15, 1781, Raft Swamp
- November 14, 1781, Moore's Plantation
- November 15, 1781, Brick House
- November 16, 1781, Seven Creeks
- November 18, 1781, Evacuation of Wilmington

Other majors in the unit were Maj. John Carruth and Maj. James White. The unit was disbanded in late November 1781.

== Forts and garrisons ==
- Fort Hancock Garrison
- Fort Johnston Garrison
- Camp Quankey, Quartermaster Depot for the North Carolina Line

== Bibliography ==
- Howard, Josh (2010). "North Carolina in the American Revolution".
- Wheeler, John Hill (1884). "Reminiscences and Memoirs of North Carolina and Eminent North Carolinians: Genealogy of the Ashe family".
- Ashe, Samuel A'Court (1906). Biographical History of North Carolina from Colonial Times to the Present. C. L. Van Noppen.
