= Edward Buncombe =

- Born: 1742; St. Christopher, West Indies
- Died: 1778 (aged 35–36); Philadelphia, Pennsylvania
- Burial place: Christ Church Burial Ground, Philadelphia, Pennsylvania
- Spouse: Elizabeth Dawson Taylor
- Military career
- Allegiance: United States of America
- Branch: North Carolina militia, Continental Army
- Service years: 1775-1778
- Rank: Colonel
- Units: Tyrrell County Regiment, 5th North Carolina Regiment
- Commands: Tyrrell County Regiment, 5th North Carolina Regiment
- Conflicts: Battle of Brandywine Creek, Battle of Germantown

Edward Buncombe (1742–1778) was a plantation owner from the Province of North Carolina who served as a colonel in the North Carolina militia and Continental Army (the army of the Patriot side) in the American Revolutionary War. He is the namesake of Buncombe County in western North Carolina. In 1820, his surname (in its status as the name of that county) became the source of the derogatory American slang term, "bunkum" and its shortened form, "bunk" in consequence of the U.S. representative for the county, Felix Walker, invoking the county during a poorly received speech delivered on the floor of the U.S. House of Representatives.

== Biography ==
Buncombe was born in 1742 on the West Indies island of St. Christopher (today St. Kitts). He grew up there and in England. He immigrated to North Carolina in 1768 and settled at a plantation he had inherited near the shore of Albemarle Sound on the Atlantic coast, in what is now Washington County. In 1774, as the independence movement of the Thirteen Colonies gathered steam, he took a leading role in convening proindependence meetings, especially the First Provincial Congress, which is reportedly the first assembly anywhere in the Thirteen Colonies to defy a royal governor.

Service record:

- Colonel Tyrrell County Regiment, North Carolina militia (1771-1775)
- 4/15/1776 until his death in May 1778, Colonel of the 5th North Carolina Regiment
- 10/4/1777, captured at Germantown, POW in Philadelphia, paroled
- May 1778, fell down a flight of stairs, reopened old wounds, died as a result.

He was appointed first colonel of the newly formed Tyrrell County Regiment of the North Carolina militia in 1771. The "Halifax Assembly" elected him colonel of the 5th North Carolina Regiment of the Continental Army on April 15, 1776 (three days after it had passed the historic Halifax Resolves). He was wounded and captured on October 4, 1777 at the Battle of Germantown, fought several miles outside of the rebel capital of Philadelphia, which the British had recently seized. He was left for dead and the next day a British officer who was an old friend found him and brought him to Philadelphia for medical treatment. The British army paroled him to that city. Bumcombe wrote to General George Washington requesting an exchange for a British prisoner but was ignored. The following May 1778, Col. Buncombe fell down some stairs while sleepwalking and his wounds reopened, causing him to bleed to death. He is buried in Christ Church Burial Ground in Philadelphia.

Tax records of 1782 say that his estate included 2,250 acres (9.1 km^{2}) of land and 10 Negroes.

In 1791, the State of North Carolina created a new county from parts of two other counties and named it for Col. Buncombe. The present Buncombe County is a combination of parts of the original one with parts of neighboring counties.
