= William McCormick (businessman) =

Scottish-born merchant (1742 – 1815)

William McCormick (8 April 1742 – 1815) was a Scottish-born merchant who lived in North Carolina, took the loyalist side in the American War of Independence, and played a leading role in efforts to win compensation from the British government for losses suffered as a result of the war.

== Early life ==
William was born in Edinburgh, Scotland, on 8 April 1742, the fifth child (and third son) of Samuel McCormick, the General Examiner of Excise, and his wife Helen. He worked as a clerk in the office of the solicitor of excise in Edinburgh, including two years working for T. Wharton, one of the Commissioners of Excise. He was apparently headed for promotion when he decided to emigrate to America, leaving in early 1761.

== Life in North Carolina ==
William's first job was working for Thomas MacKnight & Co in North Carolina. MacKnight was a Scotsman who had emigrated to North Carolina in 1755, and was almost certainly a relative of William's by marriage. William lived in the settlement of Windfield in the northeastern part of the province on the Pasquotank River. The Pasquotank had become an important artery of commerce, the main industries being transport, logging, and oyster harvesting. North Carolina was not heavily populated, but Windfield was on the coastal road to Virginia and well situated for trade. At some point in the 1760s William set up a company in his own name in which he had a 20% share, the balance being held by Thomas MacKnight (40%), James Parker (20%), and William Aitchison (20%). The company traded to Europe and the West Indies.

By the late 1760s, William was one of the leading members of North Carolina society, or certainly of Pasquotank County society. In November 1771, he was appointed Register (described in other places as Registrar) of Pasquotank County by Josiah Martin, governor of North Carolina (in office 1771–1775). A month later, Governor Martin, 'reposing especial trust and confidence in your loyalty, courage, and good conduct', appointed William as a captain in the Pasquotank regiment of militia, commanded by Colonel John Lowry. William McCormick & Co owned a small port and cargo facility at Windfield on 25 acres of land, several ships, and two plantations covering a total of more than 1,000 acres, well stocked with cattle, pigs, and sheep. According to one of his employees, Caleb Church, William had a house with several well-furnished rooms, which he kept 'in a very genteel way, and at a great expense', and he travelled with 'two horses and a chair and servant' and had 'several clerks in his counting house'.

But the colonial era was drawing to a close. Tensions began to build between Britain and the colonies in the early 1770s as Americans resisted the right of the British Parliament to govern without representation. Colonists were divided over which side to take during the buildup to the war, and during the war itself. About 40–45 per cent supported the revolutionaries (or patriots), about 15–20 per cent—known as loyalists, Tories or 'King's Men'—supported the British Crown, and the balance stayed neutral. William was clearly a loyalist, and was later described by one of his employees as 'one of the greatest Tories in the county.' Loyalists may have agreed with some of the principles being pursued by the revolutionaries, but they did not want to go to war over the issue.

== Life as a Loyalist ==
The first tangible effect of the unrest on William came in late 1775/early 1776 when the Belville and the Betsy, two ships (most likely brigantines, or two-masted merchant ships) owned by William McCormick & Co, were lost. The Belville (built in 1772) sailed from Windfield in December 1775 bound for Cádiz in Spain with a cargo of 500 pounds of beeswax, 61,900 pipe staves, 600 hoghead staves, and 3400 barrel staves. Because the Restraining Act (passed in 1775 in response to an American boycott of British goods, and prohibiting trade with all countries except Britain) did not extend to North Carolina (because the British government mistakenly thought that North Carolina was not part of the boycott), the ship was regularly cleared on her journeys, but this time she was intercepted by an American vessel soon after leaving.

Afraid that the ship would be captured by a British vessel that hove into sight, the captain of the American ship ordered that the cargo of the Belville be dumped overboard and the vessel be taken to New Bern. William gave bond and security to get the vessel back, she was reloaded, and she left again in early 1776. She was within a day's sail of Cádiz when she was taken by a British man of war off the coast of Spain, taken to Gibraltar, and condemned as the property of a colony in rebellion under the terms of the Prohibitory Act; this was passed in December 1775, coming into force on 1 January 1776, and aimed at destroying the American economy through a trade blockade. The ship was valued at £1500, the cargo at £600, and a slave on board at £80; everything was handed over to the captors as a prize.

The second lost ship, the Betsy, was captured by a British man of war in April/May 1776, ironically in the process of carrying provisions from North Carolina to British troops stationed in Norfolk, at the request of Lord Dunmore, governor of Virginia. As William and his partners later observed, they were 'plundered by the Americans for our loyalty on the one hand, and thus punished as partisans of rebellion on the other'.

As a loyalist who worked for the Crown, William was in a risky situation, particularly because the Second Continental Congress declared that the property of loyalists would be subject to seizure as a means of financing hostilities against England. The first North Carolina law providing for confiscation of property had been passed in November 1776, but commissioners had already been appointed to take an inventory of estates. An act of banishment against loyalists was passed in April 1777 which included the possible penalty of death for loyalists, and required everyone in the state either to take an oath of allegiance or to leave the state within 60 days. They could sell their property before leaving, otherwise it was forfeited.

William arranged for a brigantine named the Johnston that he owned jointly with Thomas MacKnight to be repaired and loaded in case of the need for a hasty departure. The boat eventually set sail in September 1777 under the pretence that it was bound for Spain, but William told the other passengers that it was his plan to go to New York and seek protection. He arrived back in Britain in about November 1778, so in all it took 14 months to make a trip that should only have taken two months.

== Return to Britain ==
Although the surrender at Yorktown in October 1781 did not mean the end of hostilities (Britain decided to suspend operations to recover the colonies in March 1782), within weeks every American state had passed a confiscation act, and loyalists had lost property worth millions of pounds. Article V of the 1783 Treaty of Paris ending the war provided that Congress would 'earnestly recommend' that states recognize the rightful owners of all confiscated lands and 'provide for the restitution of all estates, rights, and properties, which have been confiscated belonging to real British subjects'. Also, all other loyalists were to be allowed to return to their former homes for up to 12 months to recover their property or to buy back their land from the new owners. In the event, only South Carolina responded to the plea. Confiscation of property in North Carolina had begun in January 1779, and early in 1780 the property of William McCormick & Co of Pasquotank County was sold for £102,870.

By October 1782 more than 300 British-based American loyalists were receiving financial aid from Parliament. Two members of Parliament—John Wilmot and Daniel Parker Coke—were behind the passage of a 1783 Act of Parliament setting up a Royal Commission looking into the situation of the loyalists; this met sporadically between 1783 and 1788, and reported for the last time in May 1789. It gathered information and took statements with the object of providing advice to the government on who should be compensated. Their work was supported by the efforts of the loyalists themselves, who in March and July 1783 held meetings at the London Coffee House under the chairmanship of James Parker, and set up a committee (with Thomas MacKnight as one of the members) to decide who had legitimate claims; William was among the 40 or so chosen, with McCormick & Company listed separately. A total of 3,225 claims were examined by the commission, and the total final amount awarded was £3,033,091; a long way short of the more than £10.3 million claimed.
