= William Skinner (North Carolina general) =

American colonial general

- Born: December 25, 1728; Berkely, Perquimans County, North Carolina, British America
- Died: January 26, 1798 (age 70); Perquimans County, North Carolina, U.S.
- Military career
- Allegiance: United States
- Branch: North Carolina militia
- Service years: 1775-1779
- Rank: Brigadier General
- Units: Perquimans County Regiment, Edenton District Brigade of militia
- Commands: Edenton District Brigade of militia
- Conflicts: American Revolutionary War; Battle of Great Bridge

William Skinner (December 25, 1728 – January 26, 1798) was a Province of North Carolina official, planter and brigadier general in Edenton District Brigade of the North Carolina militia during the American Revolution.

== Life story ==
William was born on December 25, 1728, in Perquimans County, Province of North Carolina. He was the son of Richard Skinner and Sarah Creecey. He first married the widow Sarah Gale Corprew on May 28, 1752, and they had four known children-William Gale, Penelope, Elizabeth, and Lavinia. He married a second time to the widow Dorothy Black McDonald, and they had two known children-William and Caroline. He owned several farms in Perquimans County and was a slave owner. He died on January 26, 1798, in Perquimans County, North Carolina. He was buried at the General Williams Skinner cemetery in the Yeopim section of Perquimans County, on a farm four or five miles from the town of Hertford.

He held the following political offices:

- 1761 and 1762, represented Perquimans County in the Province of North Carolina colonial assembly
- 1775 and 1776, represented Perquimans County in the 3rd, 4th and 5th Provincial Congresses
- 1777 and 1785, represented Perquimans County in the Senate of the North Carolina General Assembly
- 1788, represented Perquimans County in the Hillsborough constitutional convention
- September 24, 1789, resigned as judge of the Admiralty Court (uncertain length of time serving)
- 1777 to 1779, treasurer for the Northern District
- 1779 to 1784, treasurer for the Edenton District
- Served as a commissioner to settle the accounts of North Carolina with the general government and as commissioner of loans for the United States in North Carolina.

== Military service ==
He served in the following units during the American Revolution:

- Lt. Colonel served in the Perquimans County Regiment of the North Carolina militia (1775-1777), He was appointed on September 9, 1775, by the North Carolina Provincial Congress. He was with this regiment at the Battle of Great Bridge, Virginia on December 9, 1775.
- Brigadier General over the Edenton District Brigade of the North Carolina militia (1777-1779), The North Carolina General Assembly appointed him on December 20, 1777, to replace Brigadier General Edward Vail, Sr., who had died in June 1777. General Skinner resigned his commission on May 9, 1779.

His statement about why he resigned his commission was "As my experience in military matters is very small, my continuing in that office might, perhaps, be a public injury, as well as fatal to those whose lives might in a manner depend on my conduct. For these reasons I take the liberty at this time of resigning that appointment which I heretofore with reluctance accepted."
