= Mussenden Ebenezer Matthews =

American military officer and politician

Lieutenant Mussenden Ebenezer Matthews
- Born: April 25, 1750; Belfast, County Antrim, Ireland
- Died: March 17, 1830 (aged 79); Iredell County, North Carolina, US
- Burial place: Old Fourth Creek Cemetery, Statesville, North Carolina
- Spouse: 1. Ann Sloan; 2. Jane Knox
- Military career
- Allegiance: United States
- Branch: North Carolina State Troops
- Service years: 1779-1780
- Rank: Lieutenant
- Unit: NC State Cavalry-Western District

Mussenden Ebenezer Matthews (1750–1830) was an early settler in Iredell County, North Carolina, military officer in the American Revolution, speaker pro tem of the North Carolina House of Commons, plantation owner, and elder in the Fourth Creek Congregation Presbyterian Church.

== Early life ==
Mussenden will sometimes appear in historical documents misspelled as Mussendin, Mussendine and Mussentine. He was born in 1750 or 1751, reportedly born in Belfast, County Antrim, Ireland. His parents were James Matthews and Mary McGill. He immigrated from Ireland to the American colonies and appeared in Rowan County, North Carolina in 1778. In 1780, "Mussentine Matthews" was one of seven Elders at the Fourth Creek Presbyterian on the records of the Orange Presbytery to which the Church belonged.

== Military service ==
Matthews was a known Lieutenant in the NC State Cavalry-Western District in 1780 under Capt. John Reid. He was also referred to as "Major" Matthews.

The following accounts of his Revolutionary War exploits have been found:

"A company of Cavalry, composed of choice men, was immediately organized. By general consent he was demanded for their leader; all his objections were overruled and to encourage his countrymen to act rather than to talk, he accepted the command. In the year 1779 he led them on an expedition into South Carolina, of several months continuance, performing a double office of Commander and Chaplain, and marched over a large part of the western section of the State."

"During this expedition two of his men were taken prisoners. As he could not recover them by force of arms, he made their case a subject of prayer, both in private and in public, with his men. In a few days they rejoined the company, having made their escape..."

"Going one day on a reconnoitering expedition, accompanied by an Officer of the company, his friend Mathews, as they emerged from a dense forest into an open field, near to and in full view of a house, they observed some fifteen or twenty British dragoons around the house, some walking about, and some ready mounted. In a moment they observed the peril of their situation from the number of the enemy, and the position of the house and open fields; that it was as impossible to escape by flight, as reckless to make an attack on ten times their number, fully aware of their approach. They halted; Mathews drew his sword, and turning in his saddle towards the wood, waves it as if summoning a company to advance. The dragoons take the alarm, and dashing off at full speed, were soon out of sight, leaving our two officers to make good their retreat."

"He was an expert rider and had his horse well trained to do his bidding.... Somewhere in South Carolina, probably about Ninety-Six, while he was out reconnoitering he ran into the enemy and found himself in a position where his only means of escape was to cross a large creek which was not fordable except at the regular ford. Instead of making for the ford where the enemy expected to head him off, he directed his course to a foot crossing, approaching which he rode his horse across on the foot log and having safely crossed, waving his sword in defiance at the pursuing enemy who though that they had hemmed, as he rode away."

== After the war ==
In 1786, Mussenden was given a Land Grant consisting of 274 Acres on Station Camp Creek just northeast of Nashville. This land was in Davidson County (now Sumner County), Tennessee and was given to him by the State of North Carolina for his service during the Revolutionary War.

In 1788 Iredell County was created from part of Rowan county, and in 1789, Mussenden was one of the first two representatives from Iredell County to the North Carolina House of Commons. He was elected to serve 13 times between 1789 and 1803. In 1796, he served as speaker of the house,

His residence was a plantation on Third Creek near Statesville where Third Creek Elementary School is located today. He had married Ann Sloan (1751-1805) before 1780 in Rowan County. Ann was the daughter of Fergus Sloan who donated the land for the Fourth Creek Congregation church. After Ann died, he married Jane Knox (1768-1833) in Iredell County.

Mussenden died on March 17, 1830 "in the 79th year of his age" and was buried in the Old Fourth Creek Cemetery in Statesville.
