= Fourth North Carolina Provincial Congress =

1776 meeting in Halifax, North Carolina

←	3rd	5th	→
- Continental Union Flag

Overview
- Legislative body: North Carolina Provincial Congress
- Jurisdiction: North Carolina (de facto)
- Meeting place: Halifax Court House
- Term: April 4, 1776 – May 14, 1776

Provincial Congress
- Members: 153 delegates
- President: Samuel Johnston
- Vice President: Cornelius Harnett

Sovereign
- Monarch: HM George III
- Governor: HE Josiah Martin

The Fourth North Carolina Provincial Congress was a meeting of the provincial congress of the de facto provincial government of North Carolina, composed of 153 delegates from 35 counties and nine towns. The congress convened in Halifax on April 4, 1776, and ended on May 14, 1776, during the final year of Josiah Martin's gubernatorial administration. Samuel Johnston was unanimously chosen as president, and Cornelius Harnett was appointed as vice president of the congress.

== History ==
=== Resolutions ===
John Trumbull's painting, Declaration of Independence, depicting the five-man drafting committee of the Declaration of Independence presenting their work to the Congress. Hewes and Penn are depicted in the back row. Hooper missed the initial vote approving it on the Fourth of July, 1776, but was able to sign it on August 2, 1776.

The delegates authorized their representatives to the Second Continental Congress to vote for independence, including Joseph Hewes, William Hooper, and John Penn. The 83 delegates present on April 12, 1776 adopted the Halifax Resolves. On April 13, 1776, the delegates formed a committee to start working on a North Carolina Constitution, which was ratified in December by the Fifth North Carolina Provincial Congress. In April 1776, the congress passed a resolve to move loyalists while allowing them to dispose of their property. Later in May 1776, the congress passed a resolve to confiscate the property of those taking up arms against the United Colonies.

=== Delegates ===
Samuel Johnston, Chowan County

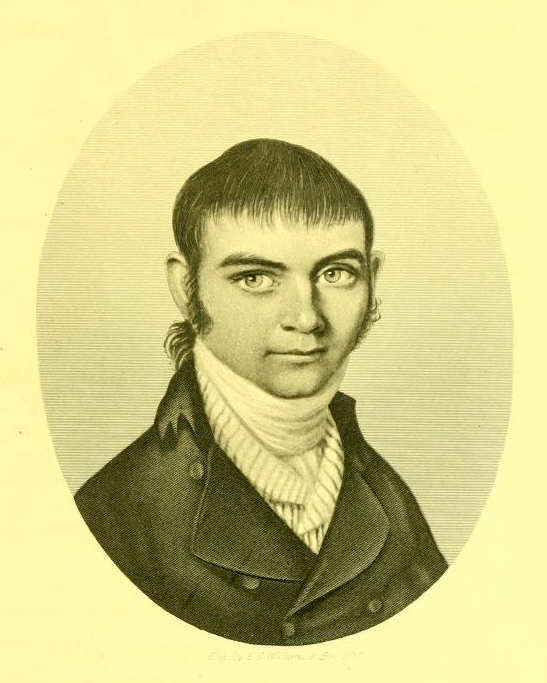
Thomas Amis, Halifax County

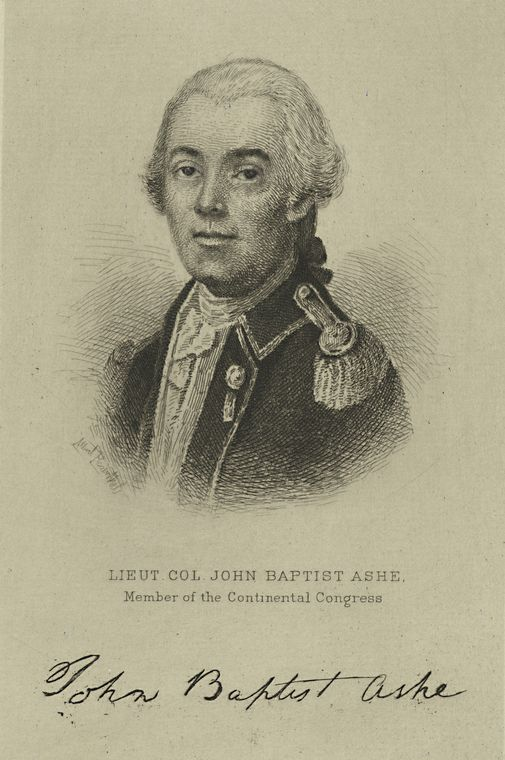
John Baptista Ashe, New Hanover County

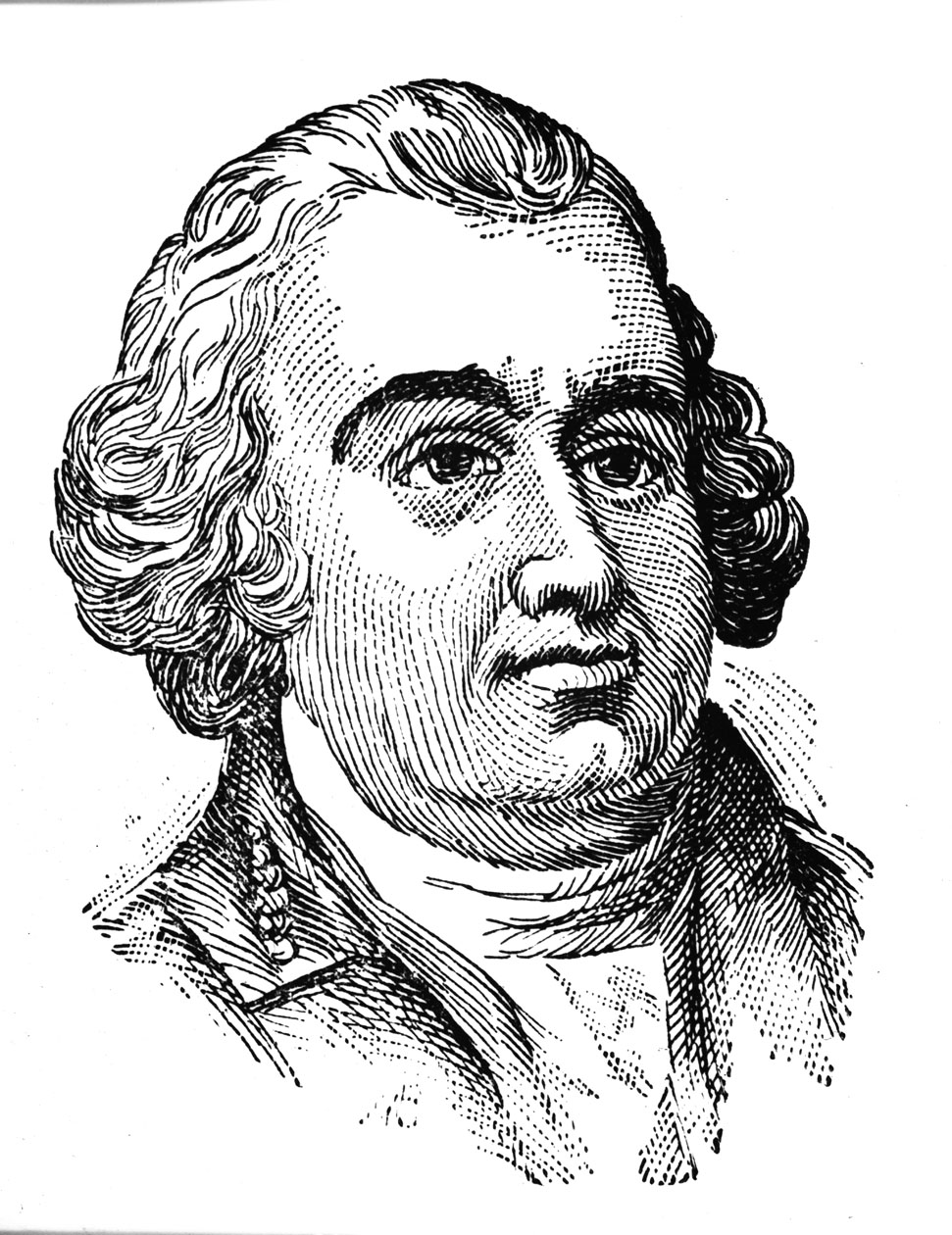
Thomas Burke, Orange County

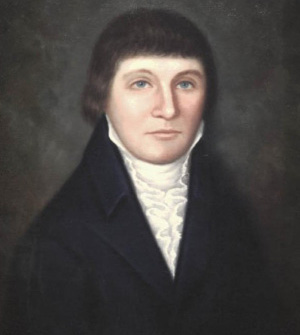
Richard Caswell, Dobbs County

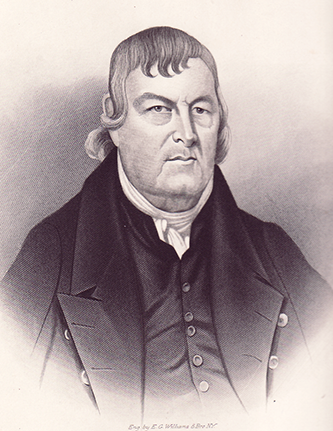
Philemon Hawkins, II, Bute County

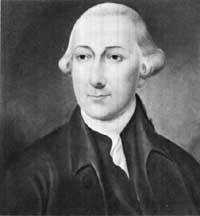
Joseph Hewes, Edenton

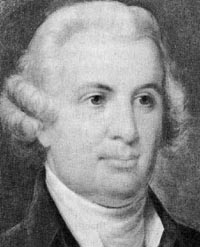
William Hooper, New Hanover County

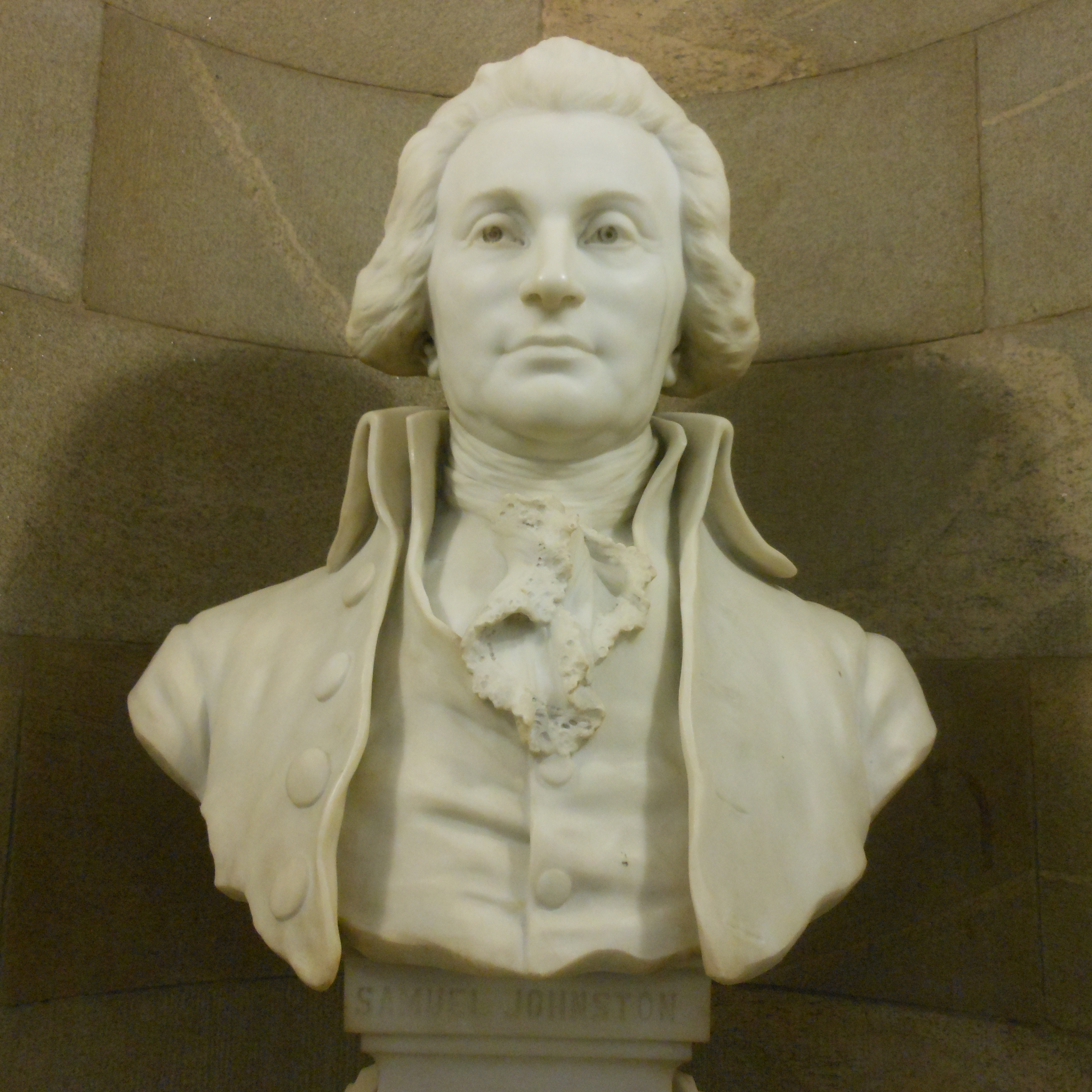
Samuel Johnston, Chowan County

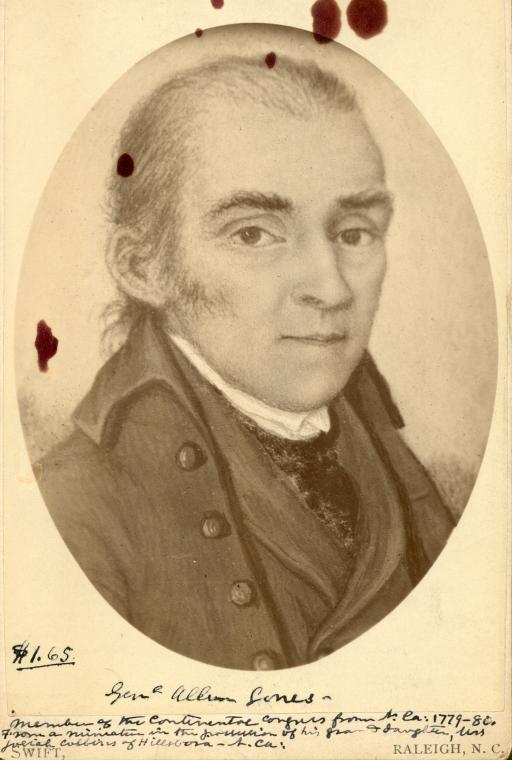
Allen Jones, Northampton County

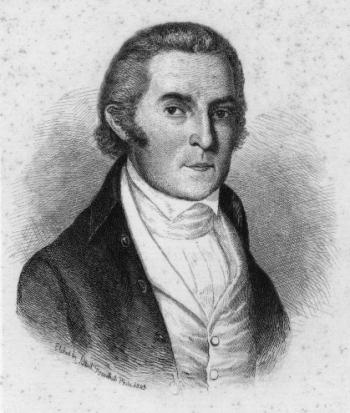
Willie Jones, Halifax County

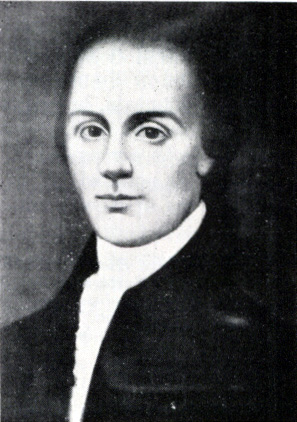
Abner Nash, New Bern

John Penn, Granville County

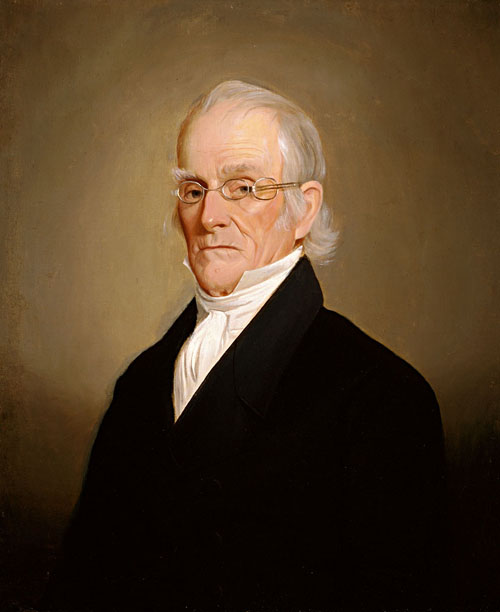
Nathaniel Rochester, Orange County

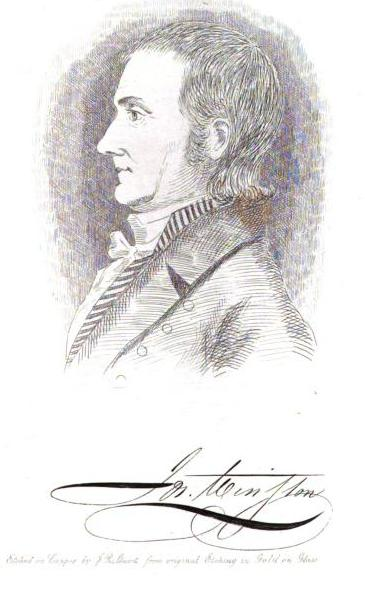
Joseph Winston, Surry County

The following is a full list of delegates to the fourth congress by constituency.

Constituency	Name
Anson County	John Child
Anson County	John Crawford
Anson County	Daniel Love
Anson County	James Pickett
Anson County	Samuel Spencer
Beaufort County	John Cowper
Beaufort County	Roger Ormond
Beaufort County	Thomas Respess, jun.
Bertie County	John Campbell
Bertie County	John Johnston
Bertie County	Charles Jaycocks
Bladen County	Thomas Amis
Bladen County	Maturin Colville
Bladen County	James Council
Bladen County	Nathaniel Richardson
Bladen County	Thomas Robeson, jun.
Brunswick County	not represented
Bute County	William Alston
Bute County	Philemon Hawkins
Bute County	Green Hill
Bute County	William Person
Bute County	Thomas Sherrod
Carteret County	John Backhouse
Carteret County	Solomon Shepard
Carteret County	William Thompson
Chatham County	Elisha Cain
Chatham County	Jeduthan Harper
Chatham County	Ambrose Ramsey
Chatham County	Joseph Rosser
Chatham County	John Thompson
Chowan County	Thomas Benbury
Chowan County	John B. Beasly
Chowan County	Thomas Hunter
Chowan County	Samuel Johnston
Chowan County	Thomas Jones
Craven County	Jacob Blount
Craven County	John Bryan
Craven County	William Bryan
Craven County	James Coor
Craven County	Lemuel Hatch
Cumberland County	David Smith
Cumberland County	Alexander McAllister
Cumberland County	Farquard Campbell
Cumberland County	Thomas Rutherford
Cumberland County	Alexander McKay
Currituck County	Samuel Jarvis
Currituck County	Gideon Lamb
Currituck County	Solomon Perkins
Currituck County	James Ryan
Currituck County	James White
Dobbs County	Simon Bright
Dobbs County	Richard Caswell
Dobbs County	William McKinnie
Dobbs County	George Miller
Dobbs County	Abraham Sheppard
Duplin County	Richard Clinton
Duplin County	William Dickson
Duplin County	Thomas Gray
Edgecombe County	Elisha Battle
Edgecombe County	Nathan Boddie
Edgecombe County	William Haywood
Edgecombe County	Henry Irwin
Edgecombe County	Duncan Lemon
Granville County	Charles A. Eaton
Granville County	Memucan Hunt
Granville County	John Penn
Granville County	Thomas Person
Granville County	John Taylor
Guilford County	William Dent
Guilford County	Ralph Gorrell, jun.
Guilford County	Ransom Sutherland
Halifax County	Willis Alston
Halifax County	John Bradford
Halifax County	James Hogun
Halifax County	David Sumner
Halifax County	Joseph John Williams
Hertford County	Lawrence Baker
Hertford County	Matthias Brickell, jun.
Hertford County	William Murfree (Note: Possibly the father of William Murfree)
Hertford County	Robert Sumner
Hyde County	Joseph Hancock
Hyde County	John Jordan
Hyde County	Rotheas Latham
Hyde County	Benjamin Parmelin
Johnston County	Samuel Smith, jun.
Johnston County	Henry Rains
Johnston County	Needham Bryan, jun.
Martin County	Whitmell Hill
Martin County	Kenneth McKenzie
Martin County	Edward Smithwick
Martin County	Thomas Wiggins
Martin County	William Williams
Mecklenburg County	John McKnitt Alexander
Mecklenburg County	Robert Irwin
Mecklenburg County	John Phifer
New Hanover County	John Ashe
New Hanover County	Samuel Ashe
New Hanover County	John DeVane
New Hanover County	John Hollingsworth
New Hanover County	Sampson Mosely
Northampton County	Jeptha Atherton
Northampton County	Howell Edmunds
Northampton County	Drewry Gee
Northampton County	Eaton Haynes
Northampton County	Allen Jones
Northampton County	Samuel Lockhart
Northampton County	Eaton Haynes
Onslow County	Benjamin Doty
Onslow County	John King
Onslow County	George Mitchell
Onslow County	John Norman
Onslow County	John Spicer
Orange County	Thomas Burke
Orange County	John Butler
Orange County	John Kinchen
Orange County	Nathaniel Rochester
Orange County	James Saunders
Pasquotank County	Henry Abbot
Pasquotank County	Thomas Boyd
Pasquotank County	Dempsey Burgess
Pasquotank County	William Cumming
Pasquotank County	Joseph Jones
Perquimans County	Charles Blount
Perquimans County	Miles Harvey
Perquimans County	Thomas Harvey
Perquimans County	Charles Moore
Perquimans County	William Skinner
Pitt County	William Robeson
Pitt County	Edward Salter
Pitt County	John Simpson
Rowan County	John Johnston
Rowan County	Matthew Locke
Rowan County	Griffith Rutherford
Surry County	Charles Gordon
Surry County	Joseph Williams
Surry County	Joseph Winston
Tryon County	James Johnston
Tryon County	Charles McLean
Tyrrell County	Archibald Corry
Wake County	John Hinton
Wake County	William Hooper
Wake County	Tignal Jones
Wake County	Joel Lane
Wake County	John Rand
Town of Bath	William Brown
Edenton	Joseph Hewes
Newbern	Abner Nash
Wilmington	Cornelius Harnett
Brunswick	not represented
Halifax	Willie Jones (Note: Willie Jones had to leave the provincial congress because he was elected by the Continental Congress to serve as the Superintendent of Indian Affairs. John Webb replaced him.)
Halifax	John Webb
Hillsborough	William Johnston
Salisbury	David Nesbitt
Campbelton (Note: Campbelton became part of Fayetteville, North Carolina, in 1783.)	Arthur Council
