= John Pugh Williams =

American Revolutionary officer

- Born: c. 1750
- Died: 1803; Wilmington, New Hanover County, North Carolina
- Spouse: Jane Davis
- Military career
- Allegiance: United States of America
- Branch: North Carolina militia
- Service years: 1775-1780
- Rank: Brigadier General Pro Tempore
- Units: Edenton District Minutemen, 5th North Carolina Regiment, Bertie County Regiment
- Commands: Edenton District Brigade

John Pugh Williams (c. 1750 – 1803) was an officer in the American Revolution from Bertie County, North Carolina. He represented Bertie County in the North Carolina House of Commons in 1779 and New Hanover County in 1785, 1786, 1788, and 1789.

== Military service ==
He was an officer during the American Revolution in North Carolina units.

- Captain in the Edenton District Minutemen (1775-1776)
- Captain in the 5th North Carolina Regiment (1776-1778)
- Colonel in the Bertie County Regiment of the North Carolina militia - 1778-1779
- Brigadier General (Pro Tempore) over the Edenton District Brigade of the North Carolina militia (May 1779)
- Colonel on Staff to Maj. Gen. Richard Caswell (1780)

It is reported that John Pugh (pronounced and sometimes spelled Pue) Williams was a brother of Benjamin Williams, the Governor of North Carolina, and that he was recommended to Thomas Jefferson for a political appointment in 1801.
