= Edward Vail =

- Born: August 6, 1717 unknown
- Died: June 5, 1777, age 60; Chowan County, North Carolina
- Spouse: Susannah
- Children: four sons
- Military career
- Allegiance: United States of America
- Branch: North Carolina militia
- Service years: 1775-1777
- Rank: Brigadier General
- Units: Edenton District Minutemen, Edenton District Brigade of militia
- Commands: Edenton District Minutemen, Edenton District Brigade of militia

Edward Vail, Sr. (1717-1777) was a Revolutionary War Colonel of the Edenton District Minutemen and Brigadier General Edenton District Brigade in North Carolina. Prior to the war, he was a captain in the Chowan County militia during the French and Indian War, as well as member of the Chowan County Courts and represented Chowan County in the Province of North Carolina General Assembly from 1754 to 1762, 1770 to 1771, and 1773 to 1774. He was a member of the North Carolina Committee of Correspondence, which was formed in December 1773.

== Military service ==
- Captain in the Chowan County militia during the French and Indian War (1754-1763)
- September 9, 1775, commissioned as a colonel in the North Carolina militia
- Commander of the Edenton District Minutemen (1775-1776)
- May 4, 1776, commissioned as a Brigadier General in the North Carolina militia
- Commander of the Edenton District Brigade of Militia (1776-1777)
