= Isaac Gregory =

American brigadier general (c.1737–1800)

- Born: circa 1737; Pasquotank County, North Carolina, British America
- Died: April 1800 (age 63); Camden County, North Carolina, U.S.
- Spouse(s): Elizabeth Whedbee; Sarah Lamb
- Military career
- Allegiance: United States of America
- Branch: North Carolina militia
- Service years: 1775-1783
- Rank: Brigadier General
- Unit: Pasquotank County Regiment
- Commands: Camden County Regiment; Edenton District Brigade
- Conflicts: American Revolutionary War; Battle of Camden
- Other work: politician

Isaac Gregory (c. 1737–1800) was a politician, Senator in the North Carolina General Assembly, and Brigadier General in the North Carolina militia during the American Revolution.

== Early life ==
Isaac was born in about 1737 in Pasquotank County, Province of North Carolina. He was the son of William Gregory and Judith Morgan. He held positions in Pasquotank County as Justice in 1765 and Collector of Public Debts in 1769-1770, and Sheriff (1770, 1773). He represented Pasquotank County in the last Province of North Carolina House of Burgesses General in 1775. He was a delegate to the North Carolina Provincial Congresses in 1775 and 1776 when the North Carolina constitution was written. He served as a member of the Edenton District Committee of Safety. In July 1777, the General Assembly named him to a committee to establish a courthouse and other public building for the newly created Camden County (created in 1777 from portions of northern Pasquotank County), where many of Isaac's land holdings were located. He represented Camden County in the North Carolina House of Commons in 1780-1781. Then Gregory was a senator in the North Carolina General Assembly of 1782. He represented his county for ten terms in the senate between 1782 and 1795. He was an active Federalist and delegate to the constitutional conventions of 1788 and 1789.

Gregory's first wife was Elizabeth Whedbee (some sources say she was a daughter of Caleb Sawyer). His second wife was Sarah Lamb. His children were William, Isaac, Mary, Sarah, Penelope, and Harriett. He died in April 1800 and was buried on his plantation, Fairfax (often called Fairfield), in Camden County. The Fairfax plantation dates from the 1740s.

"A lady, who remembers General Gregory well, says that he was a large, fine looking man. He was exceedingly polite, had a very grand air, and in dress was something of a fop."

== Military service ==
During the Revolutionary War, he held the following positions:

- Lt. Colonel in the Pasquotank County Regiment of the North Carolina militia (1775)
- Colonel over the 2nd Pasquotank County Regiment of the North Carolina militia (1775-1777)
- Colonel over the Camden County Regiment of the North Carolina militia (1777-1779)
- Brigadier General over the Edenton District Brigade of the North Carolina militia (1779-1783)

He nearly died while leading the Edenton District Brigade at the Battle of Camden in South Carolina when his horse was shot from under him and he was bayonetted. General Charles Cornwallis reported him dead. The British assumed he was going to die but he recovered.

== Sources ==
- Hampton, Jeff (August 14, 2011). "General Isaac Gregory". The Virginian-Pilot., Camden County, North Carolina
- Pugh, Jesse Forbes (1957). Three Hundred Years Along the Pasquotank: A Biographical History of Camden County.
- Ashe, Samuel A. Ashe, ed. (1906). Biographical History of North Carolina, vol. 4.
- Clark, Walter Clark (ed.). State Records of North Carolina, vols. 13-15, 18-19, 22-25 (1896–1906).
- Pasquotank County Historical Society (1957). Pasquotank County Historical Society Year Book, vol. 3.
- Saunders, William L., ed. (1890). Colonial Records of North Carolina, vols. 8-10.
- Simcoe, J. G. (1844). A History of the Operations of a Partisan Corps, Called The Queen's Rangers.
- "Isaac Gregory Marker, located at US 158/NC 34 at Camden".
