= William Cumming (Continental Congress) =

American lawyer and delegate to the Continental Congress

William Cumming (July 30, 1724–1797) was an American lawyer who served as a delegate to the Continental Congress for North Carolina in 1785.

William was born in Annapolis, Maryland on July 30, 1724. He read law and practiced in Maryland for several years before he moved to Edenton, North Carolina. In North Carolina his law practice extended into several counties: Chowan, Currituck, and Pasquotank Counties.

Cumming attended the colony's Provincial Congress in 1776 and was first elected to North Carolina's House of Commons in 1781, and served in several other terms as well. In 1784 and 1785 the legislature named him as a delegate to the Continental Congress, but he only attended sessions of the Congress in 1785.
