= Edenton District Brigade =

- Active: 1776-1783
- Allegiance: (United States) North Carolina
- Branch: North Carolina militia
- Type: Militia
- Part of: Brigade

Commanders
- Notable commanders: Brigadier General Edward Vail, Sr. Brigadier General William Skinner; Brigadier General Isaac Gregory

The Edenton District Brigade was an administrative division of the North Carolina militia during the American Revolutionary War (1776–1783). This unit was established by the North Carolina Provincial Congress on May 4, 1776, and disbanded at the end of the war.

== History ==
Known commanders/commandants:

1. Brigadier General Edward Vail, Sr. (1776-1777)
2. Brigadier General William Skinner (1777-1779)
3. Brigadier General John Pugh Williams (Pro Tempore) (May 1779)
4. Brigadier General Isaac Gregory (1779-1783)
5. Brigadier General Thomas Benbury (Pro Tempore) (October 1780)

Edward Vail, Sr. was commissioned as the first commander of the Edenton District Brigade on May 4, 1776. William Skinner was appointed by the North Carolina General Assembly on December 20, 1777, to replace, general Edward Vail who died on June 5, 1777. John Pugh was commissioned as a Brigadier General commanding the Edenton District Brigade on May 12, 1779; however, he resigned his position after three days to take up a new position as a colonel on the staff of Major General Caswell, commander of the North Carolina Militia and State Troops. Brigadier General Issac Gregory replaced him on May 15, 1779. Thomas Benbury served as commander for a short time in October 1780 when general Gregory was in the western part of the state.

== Regiments ==
The known regiments of the Edenton District Brigade were as follows:

Unit	Subordinate Brigade	Created	Disbanded	Original Commander, Rank
Edenton District Brigade	North Carolina Militia	1776	1783	Vail, Edward, Brigadier General
1st Regiment of North Carolina militia	Edenton	1780	1780	Jarvis, Samuel, Col
2nd Regiment of North Carolina militia	Edenton	1780	1780	Exum, Benjamin, Col
Bertie County Regiment	Edenton	1775	1783	Witmell, Thomas, Col
Camden County Regiment	Edenton	1777	1783	Gregory, Isaac, Col
Chowan County Regiment	Edenton	1775	1783	Bonner, Thomas, Col
Currituck County Regiment	Edenton	1775	1783	Jarvis, Samuel, Col
Gates County Regiment	Edenton	1779	1783	Baker, Lawrence, Col
Hertford County Regiment	Edenton	1775	1783	Wynns, Benjamin, Col
Martin County Regiment	Edenton, Halifax	1775	1783	Williams, William, Col
1st Pasquotank County Regiment	Edenton	1775	1783	Lowery, John, Col
2nd Pasquotank County Regiment	Edenton	1775	1777	Gregory, Isaac, Col
Perquimans County Regiment	Edenton	1775	1783	Harvey, Miles, Col
Tyrrell County Regiment	Edenton	1775	1783	Buncombe, Edward, Col

=== 1st and 2nd Regiments ===
On June 2, 1780, the North Carolina Legislature authorized two new special regiments of Militia to be raised and led by Colonel Samuel Jarvis of the Currituck County Regiment and Colonel Benjamin Exum of the Wayne County Regiment. These and many other county militia regiments were quickly assembled under Major General Richard Caswell at Cross Creek and Brigadier General Griffith Rutherford at Salisbury in July. They were marched to join up with the recently arrived Major General Horatio Gates of the Continental Army, and led into South Carolina to stop the British if possible. Both regiments fought at the Battle of Lynches Creek on August 11, 1780, and Battle of Camden on August 16, 1780, in South Carolina. After the Battle of Camden, both units retreated to Salisbury and were disbanded on September 2, 1780.

=== Bertie County Regiment ===
The Bertie County Regiment was one of the 35 existing county militias to be authorized as a regiment of the North Carolina militia by the North Carolina Provincial Congress on September 9, 1775. It was active until the end of the war. The colonels included:

- Colonel Thomas Whitmell (commander 1775–1778)
- Colonel Thomas Pugh (commander 1778–1780)
- Colonel John Pugh Williams (2nd colone, 1778–1779)
- Colonel James Moore (1780/1781-1783?)
- Colonel James Campbell (1780-1783?)

Companies of the Bertie County Regiment were engaged in five known battles and skirmishes: Battle of Brier Creek in Georgia on March 3, 1779, Battle of Stono Ferry in South Carolina on June 20, 1779, Siege of Charleston from March 18 to May 12, 1780, Little Lynches Creek in South Carolina on August 11, 1780, and the Battle of Camden in South Carolina on August 16, 1780.

=== Chowan County Regiment ===
The Chowan County Regiment was one of the 35 existing county militias to be authorized as a regiment of the North Carolina militia by the North Carolina Provincial Congress on September 9, 1775. It was active until the end of the war. The colonels included:

- Colonel Thomas Bonner (1775-1779)
- Colonel James Blount (1779-1783)

There are very few records about this unit. However, the regiment is known to have been engaged in the Battle of Brier Creek in Georgia on March 3, 1779.

=== Currituck County Regiment ===
The Currituck County Regiment was one of the 35 existing county militias to be authorized as a regiment of the North Carolina militia by the North Carolina Provincial Congress on September 9, 1775. It was active until the end of the war. The colonels included:

- Colonel Samuel Jarvis (1775-1783)
- Colonel Hollowell Williams (2nd colonel 1776–1777)
- Colonel Solomon Perkins (2nd colonel 1777–1779)

The Currituck County Regiment was known to have been involved in five battles and skirmishes: Battle of Great Bridge in Virginia on December 9, 1775, Battle of Brier Creek in Georgia on March 3, 1779, Battle of Camden in South Carolina on August 16, 1780, and the Siege of Charleston from March 28 to May 12, 1780.

=== Gates County Regiment ===
When Gates County was formed by the North Carolina General Assembly from Chowan County, Hertford County, and Perquimans County on January 30, 1779, the Gates County Regiment was also established and continued to be active until the end of the war in 1783. The colonels included:

- Colonel Lawrence Baker (2nd colonel 1779–1783)
- Colonel Kadar Reddick (commander 1779–1783)

The Gates County Regiment was engaged in seven known battles and skirmishes: Battle of Brier Creek in Georgia on March 3, 1779, Charleston Neck in South Carolina on May 11–13, 1779, Battle of Stono Ferry in South Carolina on June 20, 1779, Siege of Charleston in South Carolina from March 28 to May 12, 1780, Battle of Camden in South Carolina on August 16, 1780, the Battle of Guilford Courthouse in North Carolina on March 15, 1781, and the Battle of Eutaw Springs in South Carolina on September 8, 1781.

=== Hertford County Regiment ===
The Hertford County Regiment was one of the 35 existing county militias to be authorized as a regiment of the North Carolina militia by the North Carolina Provincial Congress on September 9, 1775. It was active until the end of the war. The colonels included:

- Colonel Benjamin Wynns (1775-1780)
- Colonel Matthias Brickell, Jr. (1779-1780)
- Colonel George Lytle (2nd colonel by 1780)
- Colonel George Wynns (1780-1783)

The Hertford County Regiment was known to have been engaged in three battles: Battle of Great Bridge in Virginia on December 9, 1775, Siege of Charleston in South Carolina from March 28 to May 12, 1780, and the skirmish in Hillsborough in North Carolina on September 12, 1781.

=== Martin County Regiment ===
The Martin County Regiment was one of the 35 existing county militias to be authorized as a regiment of the North Carolina militia by the North Carolina Provincial Congress on September 9, 1775. The regiment was transferred to the Halifax District Brigade of the North Carolina militia under Brigadier General Allen Jones in December 1777. It was active until the end of the war. The colonels included:

- Colonel William Williams (1775-1778)
- Colonel Whitmell Hill (1778, 1781–1783)
- Colonel Thomas Wiggins (2nd colonel, 1778–1782)

The Martin Count Regiment was known to have been involved in four battles during the American Revolution: Battle of Brier Creek in Georgia on March 3, 1779, Battle of Camden in South Carolina on August 16, 1780, the Battle of Guilford Court House in North Carolina on March 15, 1781, and the Battle of Hobkirk's Hill in South Carolina on April 25, 1781.

=== Pasquotank County Regiment ===
The Pasquotank County Regiment was one of the 35 existing county militias to be authorized as a regiment of the North Carolina militia by the North Carolina Provincial Congress on September 9, 1775. On December 22, 1775, the regiment was split into a 1st Pasquotank County Regiment and a 2nd Pasquotank Regiment. On May 9, 1777, the 2nd Pasquotank Regiment was renamed the Camden County Regiment and the 1st Pasquotank County Regiment reverted to just the Pasquotank County Regiment. It was active until the end of the war. The colonels included:

- Colonel John Lowery (1775-1776)
- Colonel Thomas Boyd (1776-1783)

Colonel Lowry commanded the Pasquotank County Regiment as early as 1771 when William McCormick was appointed as Captain by Governor Josiah Martin. Captain McCormick was a loyalist.

The Pasquotank County Regiment was involved in two known engagements: Battle of Great Bridge in Virginia on December 9, 1775, and the Battle of Camden in South Carolina on August 16, 1780.

=== Camden County Regiment ===
The Camden County Regiment was originally called the 2nd Pasquotank County Regiment, which was formed from the Pasquotank County Regiment on December 2, 1775, when it was split into 1st and 2nd Pasquotank County regiments. On May 9, 1777, the 2nd Pasquotank County Regiment was renamed the Camden County Regiment. The colonels included:

- Colonel Isaac Gregory (1775-1777, 2nd Pasquotank County Regiment), (1777-1779, Camden County Regiment)
- Colonel Dempsey Burgess (1779)
- Colonel John Gregory (1779-1783)
- Colonel Peter Dauge/Dozier (1779-1783)

As the 2nd Pasquotank County Regiment, it was not involved in any engagements. After it became the Camden County Regiment it was involved in two battles, the Battle of Stono Ferry on June 20, 1779, and the Battle of Guilford Court House on March 15, 1781.

=== Perquimans County Regiment ===
The Perquimans County Regiment was one of the 35 existing county militias to be authorized as a regiment of the North Carolina militia by the North Carolina Provincial Congress on September 9, 1775. It was active until the end of the war. The colonels included:

- Colonel Miles Harvey (1775-1776), He died in 1776.
- Colonel Thomas Harvey (1776-1783)

The Perquimans County Regiment was engage in only one known battle during the American Revolution, the Battle of Great Bridge on December 9, 1775, in Virginia.

=== Tyrrell County Regiment ===
The Tyrrell County Regiment was one of the 35 existing county militias to be authorized as a regiment of the North Carolina militia by the North Carolina Provincial Congress on September 9, 1775. It was active until the end of the war. The colonels included:

- Colonel Edward Buncombe (1775–1776)
- Colonel Clement Cook (1776)
- Colonel Benjamin Blount (1776–1779)
- Colonel James Long (1779–1783)

The Tyrrell County Regiment was engaged in the Battle of Brier Creek in Georgia on March 3, 1779, the Siege of Charleston from March 28 to May 12, 1780, and the Battle of Eutaw Springs in South Carolina on September 8, 1781.

== Re-dedication of grave marker ==
On 15 August 2001, there was a re-dedication of a Grave Marker for the Revolutionary War General Isaac Gregory, which, in part, reads: "from January through July, General Gregory with his Militia, having returned to the Northwest River Bridge [the location of Black Swamp on the border of North Carolina and Virginia] again successfully guarded & defended the Edenton Military District (the counties bordering the Albemarle Sound or Chowan River), this time through repeated engagements around the Dismal Swamp [i.e. Black Swamp] against the army from Norfolk [Kemps Landing] … until the British retreated from Portsmouth to Yorktown in August of 1781."

"General Gregory's existing tombstone, erected before 1920 by the D.A.R., marked his grave in the field between Fairfield Hall and the Palmer Road about 200 yards south of the home; but it fell in the 1970's, was stolen and then shortly recovered by the sheriff, and finally was garaged for three decades by a family member. The stone has been erected again now in front of the Sawyer Cemetery, directly across the Palmer Road from the site of Fairfield Hall and the grave, by Edenton's S.A.R. chapter which has attached to it bronze plaques reciting further details of the General's life & career."
