= North Carolina General Assembly of 1778 =

Three sessions of the general assembly by North Carolina held in 1778-1779

2nd North Carolina General Assembly (1778-1779)
←	1777	1779	→

Overview
- Legislative body: North Carolina General Assembly
- Jurisdiction: North Carolina, United States
- Meeting place: 1st New Bern, 2nd Hillsborough, 3rd Halifax sessions
- Term: 1778–1779

North Carolina Senate
- Members: 41 Senators (41 counties, including Washington County/District)
- Speaker: Whitmell Hill
- Clerk: John Sitgreaves

North Carolina House of Commons
- Members: 88 Representatives (41 counties with two each, 6 districts with one each)
- Speaker: John Williams, Thomas Benbury
- Clerk: John Hunt

Sessions
- 1st: April 14 – May 2, 1778
- 2nd: August 8, 1778 – August 19, 1778
- 3rd: January 19 – February 13, 1779

The North Carolina General Assembly of 1778 met in three sessions in three locations in the years 1778 and 1779. The first session was held in New Bern from April 14 to May 2, 1778; the second session in Hillsborough, from August 8 to August 19, 1778; the third and final session in Halifax, from January 19 to February 13, 1779.

Each of the 39 North Carolina counties and Washington District/County were authorized by the North Carolina Constitution of 1776 to elect one Senator to the Senate and two representatives to the House of Commons. In addition, six districts (also called boroughs) were authorized to elect one House representative each. Richard Caswell was elected governor by the legislature.

== Legislation ==
This general assembly established Wilkes County in 1778 This general assembly established the following counties in their last session in 1779: Franklin, Gates, Jones, Lincoln, Montgomery, Randolph, Richmond, Rutherford, Warren, and Wayne Counties. For additional laws and minutes of the 1778 General Assembly, see Legislative Documents.

== Councilors of State ==
The General Assembly elected the following Councilors of State on April 18, 1778:

- Joseph Leech, from Craven County
- Thomas Bonner from Beaufort County
- William Cray from Onslow County (Note: William Cray Died in office.)
- Edward Starkey from Onslow County
- Robert Bignall from Edgecombe County
- Richard Henderson from Granville County (Note: Richard Henderson declined to serve.)
- William Haywood from Edgecombe County (Note: William Haywood declined to serve.)
- William Bryan from Craven County
- John Simpson from Pitt County
- Frederick Jones from New Hanover County (elected on February 3, 1779)

== House of Commons ==
=== House leadership ===
- Speaker: John Williams (Granville County), until April 28, 1778; Thomas Benbury (Chowan County) elected to replace Williams.
- Clerk: John Hunt (Franklin County)
- Assistant Clerk: Joseph Blithe

=== House members ===
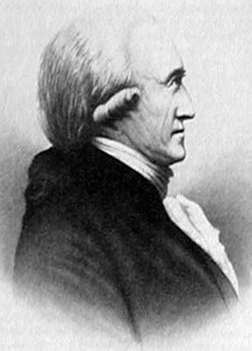
Rep. Benjamin Hawkins

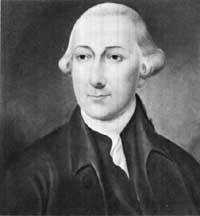
Rep. Joseph Hewes

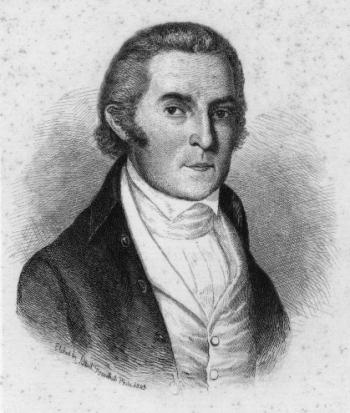
Rep. Willie Jones

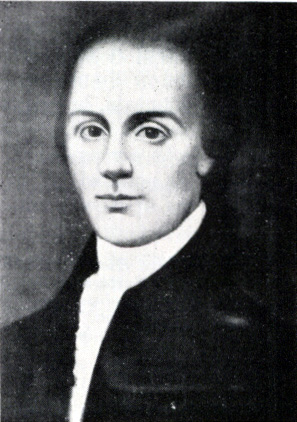
AbnerNash

The members of the House and the counties and districts they represented are listed below.

County	House of Commons Member
Anson County	George Davidson
Anson County	Stephen Miller
Beaufort County	Alderson Allerson (Note: Alderson Allerson was elected county entry taker. His seat was declared vacant on 19 January 1779.)
Beaufort County	Thomas Respress, Jr. (Note: Thomas Respress was elected to replace Alderson Allerson. He took office on February 2, 1779.)
Beaufort County	William Brown
Bertie County	William Jordan, Jr.
Bertie County	Simon Turner
Bladen County	Thomas Amis (Note: Thomas Amis was elected to another office. His seat was declared vacant on May 2, 1778.)
Bladen County	Benjamin Clark (Note: Benjamin Clark was elected to replace Thomas Amis. He took office on August 8, 1778.)
Bladen County	Samuel Cain
Brunswick County	Lewis Dupree (Note: Lewis Dupree took office on August 8, 1778 after a special election.)
Brunswick County	William Gause
Burke County	Ephraim McLaine (Note: Ephraim McLaine was elected, but there is no evidence of service.)
Burke County	Charles McLean (Note: Charles McLean took office on August 13, 1778.)
Burke County	Thomas Whitson
Bute County	Benjamin Hawkins
Bute County	Adkin McLemore
Camden County	Caleb Grandy (Note: Caleb Grady's seat vacated because he held another public office.)
Camden County	Willis Bright (Note: Willis Bright was elected to replace Caleb Grandy. He took office on January 21, 1779.)
Camden County	John Gray (Note: John Gray's seat was vacated because he held another public office.)
Camden County	William Burgess (Note: William Burgess was elected to replace John Gray. There is no evidence of service.)
Carteret County	John Easton
Carteret County	Solomon Shepperd
Caswell County	Peter Farrar
Caswell County	John Williams
Chatham County	Alexander Clark
Chatham County	James Williams
Chowan County	Thomas Benbury
Chowan County	Jacob Hunter
Craven County	Nathan Bryan
Craven County	John Tillman (Note: John Tillman resigned on April 30, 1778.)
Craven County	Abner Nash (Note: Abner Nash was elected to replace John Tillman. He took office on August 14, 1778.)
Cumberland County	Peter Mallett
Cumberland County	Robert Rowan
Currituck County	William Ferebbe
Currituck County	Holowell Williams (Note: Holowell Williams was elected, but there is no evidence that he took office.)
Dobbs County	Jesse Cobb
Dobbs County	William Fellows
Duplin County	Richard Clinton
Duplin County	Thomas Hicks
Edgecombe County	Jonas Johnston (Note: Jonas Johnston was named county entry taker. His seat was declared vacant on April 27, 1778. A new election was held. Johnston was re-elected and he took office on August 8, 1778)
Edgecombe County	Isaac Sessums
Granville County	John Williams (Note: John Williams resigned on April 28, 1778 when elected to Continental Congress.)
Granville County	Thomas Person (Note: Thomas Person was elected to replace John Williams. He took office on August 8, 1778.)
Granville County	Thorton Yancey
Guilford County	James Hunter
Guilford County	Robert Lindsay
Halifax County	Haywood
Halifax County	John Whitaker
Hertford County	William Baker
Hertford County	Arthur Cotton
Hyde County	Abraham Jones
Hyde County	Joseph Hancock
Johnston County	William Bryan
Johnston County	John Bryan, Jr.
Martin County	Nathan Mayo
Martin County	E. Edward Smithwick
Mecklenburg County	Caleb Phifer
Mecklenburg County	David Wilson
Nash County	Thomas Hunter
Nash County	Hardy Griffin
New Hanover County	Timothy Bloodworth
New Hanover County	John Devane
Northampton County	Joseph Bryan
Northampton County	Robert Peebles
Northampton County	Robert Nash
Onslow County	Benijah Doty
Onslow County	George Mitchell
Orange County	John Butler (Note: John Butler was named county record taker. His seat was declared vacant on April 27, 1778.)
Orange County	Thomas Burke (Note: Thomas Burke was elected to replace John Butler. He took office on August 8 and resigned on August 18 when elected to the Continental Congress.)
Orange County	Mark Patterson (Note: Mark Patterson was elected to replace Thomas Burke. He took office on January 20, 1779.)
Orange County	William McCauley
Pasquotank County	Thomas Harvey
Pasquotank County	Thomas Relfe
Perquimans County	Charles Blount
Perquimans County	John Harvey (Note: There is some question about sources that say it died earlier than this date.)
Pitt County	William Robeson (Note: William Robeson was named county entry taker. His seat was declared vacant on April 27, 1778.)
Pitt County	John Simpson (Note: John Simposon was elected to replace William Robeson. He took office on August 8 and was then elected to Council of State, so he resigned on August 18.)
Pitt County	James Gorham (Note: James Gorham was elected to replace John Simpson. He took office on January 21, 1779.)
Pitt County	John Williams
Rowan County	Matthew Locke
Rowan County	Moses Winslow
Surry County	Matthew Brooks
Surry County	Frederick Miller
Tryon County	William Gilbert (Note: William Gilbert was expelled from office on February 8, 1779 for fraud.)
Tryon County	Joseph Hardin Sr.
Tyrrell County	Joshua Swann
Tyrrell County	Isham Webb (Note: Isham Webb died in April 1778.)
Tyrrell County	Benjamin Spruill (Note: Benjamin Spruill was elected to replace Isham Webb. He took office on August 8, 1778.)
Wake County	Lodwick Alford
Wake County	Hardy Sanders
Washington District/County	Luke Boyer
Washington District/County	William Cooke (Note: William Cooke was named county clerk of court and his seat was declared vacant on April 27, 1778.)
Washington District/County	Jesse Walton (Note: Jesse Walton was elected to replace William Cooke. He took office on January 19, 1779.)
Wilkes County	Benjamin Cleveland
Wilkes County	Elijah Isaacs
Edenton District	Joseph Hewes
Halifax District	Willie Jones
Hillsborough District	William Courtney
New Bern District	Richard Cogdell
Salisbury District	Matthew Troy
Wilmington District	William Hooper

== Senate ==
=== Senate leadership ===
- President pro tempore: Whitmell Hill, until his election to the Continental Congress; Allen Jones elected to replace Hill
- Clerk: John Sitgreaves

=== Senate members ===
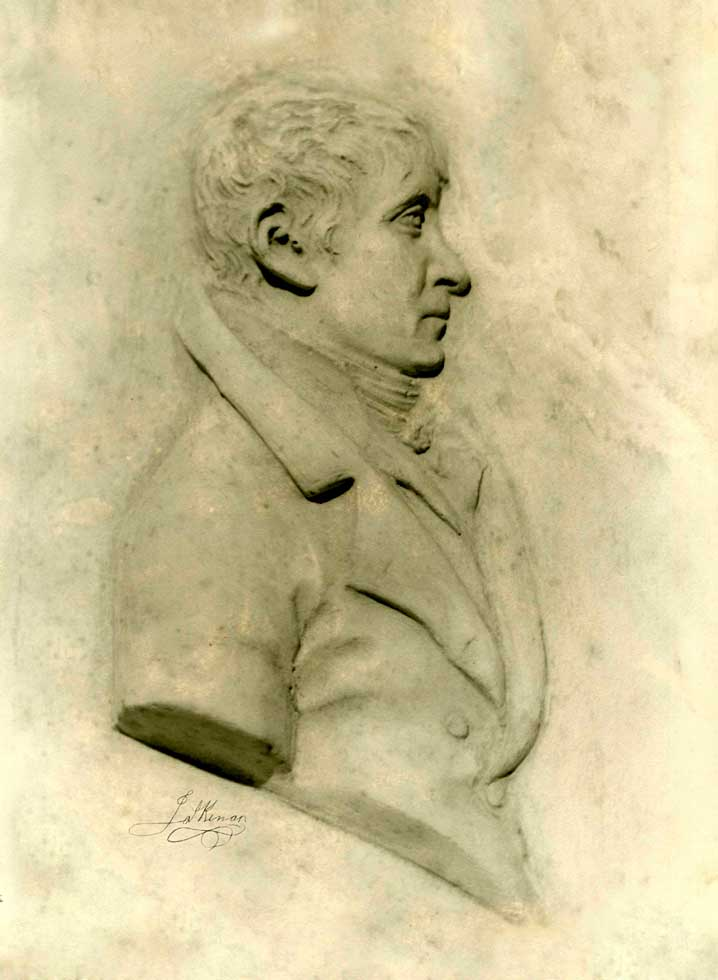
Sen. James Kenan

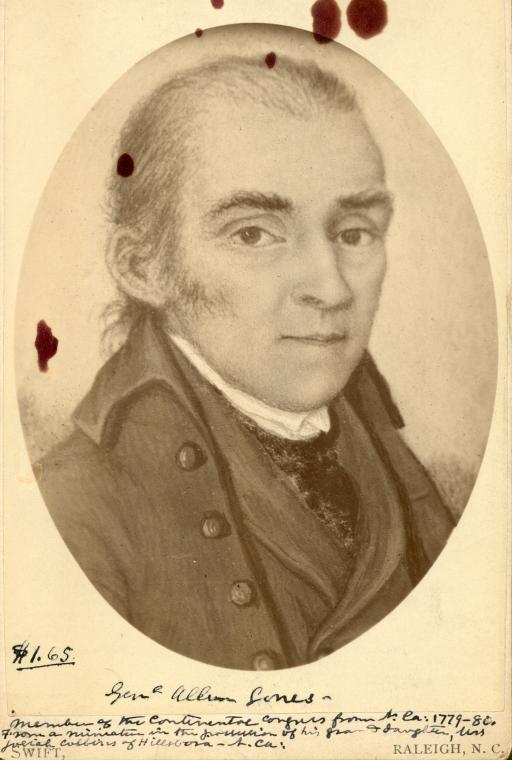
Sen. Allen Jones

The following senators and the counties they represented are listed.

County	Senate Member
Anson County	John Childs
Beaufort County	Thomas Respess
Bertie County	Zedekiah Stone
Bladen County	Thomas Owen
Brunswick County	Alexius M. Foster
Burke County	Charles McDowell (Note: Charles McDowell held another public office, so his seat was declared vacant on April 22, 1778.)
Bute County	Edward Jones
Camden County	Joseph Jones
Carteret County	William Thompson
Caswell County	James Sauders
Chatham County	Ambrose Ramsey (Note: Ambrose Ramsey held another public office, so his seat was declared vacant on April 22, 1778.)
Chatham County	John Birdsong (Note: John Birdsong was elected to replace Ambrose Ramsey. He took office on August 8, 1778.)
Chowan County	Luke Sumner
Craven County	James Coor
Cumberland County	Ebenezer Folsome
Currituck County	Solomon Perkins
Dobbs County	Benjamin Exum
Duplin County	James Kenan
Edgecombe County	Elisha Battle
Granville County	Robert Harris
Guilford County	Ralph Gorrell (Note: Ralph Gorrell held the office of county entry taker, so his seat was declared vacant on April 22, 1778.)
Guilford County	Alexander Martin (Note: Alexander Martin was elected to replace Ralph Gorrell. He took office on August 12, 1778.)
Halifax County	Oroondates Davis
Hertford County	Robert Sumner
Hyde County	William Russell
Johnston County	Needham Bryan (Note: Needham Bryan held another public office, so his seat was declared vacant on April 22, 1778.)
Martin County	Whitmell Hill (Note: Whitmell Hill was appointed to the Continental Congress, so he resigned on August 12, 1778.)
Martin County	Kenneth McKenzie (Note: Kenneth McKenzie was elected to replace Whitmell Hill. He took office on January 19, 1779.)
Mecklenburg County	Robert Irwin
Nash County	Nathan Boddie
New Hanover County	John Ashe, Jr.
Northampton County	Allen Jones
Onslow County	Henry Rhodes
Orange County	John Kinchen
Pasquotank County	John Lowrie
Perquimans County	John Eason (Note: John Eason held the office of county entry taker, so his seat was declared vacant on April 15, 1778.)
Perquimans County	Thomas Harvey (Note: Thomas Harvey was elected to replace John Eason. He took office on January 20, 1779.)
Pitt County	Robert Salter
Rowan County	Griffith Rutherford
Surry County	William Sheppard
Tryon County	William Graham
Tyrrell County	Jeremiah Frazier
Wake County	Michael Rogers
Washington District	Charles Robertson
Wilkes County	John Brown

== See also ==
- List of North Carolina state legislatures
