= North Carolina General Assembly of 1779 =

Three sessions of the general assembly of North Carolina held in 1779-1780

3rd North Carolina General Assembly (1779-1780)
←	1778	1780	→

Overview
- Legislative body: North Carolina General Assembly
- Jurisdiction: North Carolina, United States
- Meeting place: 1st Smithfield, 2nd Halifax, 3rd New Bern
- Term: 1778–1779

North Carolina Senate
- Members: 49 Senators (48 counties, plus Washington District/County)
- Speaker: Allen Jones
- Clerk: John Sitgreaves

North Carolina House of Commons
- Members: 104 Representatives authorized (49 counties with 2 each, 6 districts with 1 each) (Note: Not all counties sent two representatives. Some sent none or one.)
- Speaker: Thomas Benbury
- Clerk: John Hunt

Sessions
- 1st: May 3, 1779 – May 15, 1779
- 2nd: October 18, 1779 – November 10, 1770
- 3rd: January 1780 – February 1780

The North Carolina General Assembly of 1779 met in three sessions in three locations in the years 1779 and 1780. The first session was held in Smithfield from May 3 to May 15, 1779; the second session in Halifax, from October 18 to November 10, 1779; the third and final session in New Bern, from January to February, 1780.

Each of the 50 North Carolina counties was authorized by the North Carolina Constitution of 1776 to elect one Senator and two members of the House of Commons. In addition, six districts (also called boroughs) were authorized to elect one House member each. Richard Caswell was elected governor by the legislature.

== Legislation ==
For additional laws and minutes of the 1779 General Assembly, see Legislative Documents.

== Councilors of State ==
This General Assembly selected the following Councilors of State on May 3, 1779:

- Joseph Leech from Craven County
- Robert Bignall from Edgecombe County
- John Sampson (Note: John Sampson declined to serve as councilor of state.)
- John Simpson from Pitt County
- Thomas Respass, Senior from Beaufort County (Note: Thomas Respass declined to serve as councilor of state.)
- Isaac Guion from Craven County
- William Whitfield from Dobbs County
- Waightstill Avery from Burke Count (selected on October 25, 1779)
- Edward Starkey from Onslow County (selected on October 30, 1779)

== House of Commons ==
=== Leadership of the House of Commons ===
- Speaker: Thomas Benbury (Chowan County)
- Clerk: John Hunt (Franklin County)

=== Members of the House of Commons ===
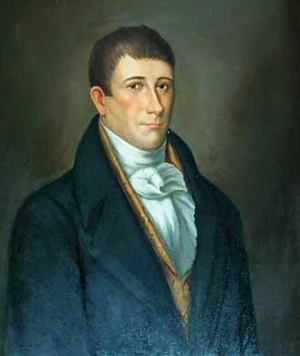
Rep. Benjamin Williams

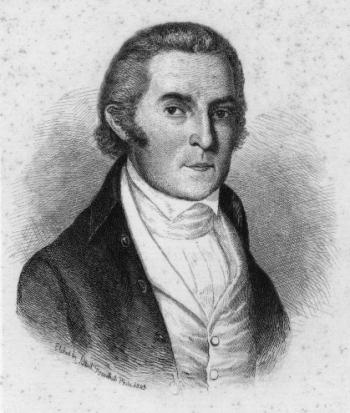
Rep. Willie Jones

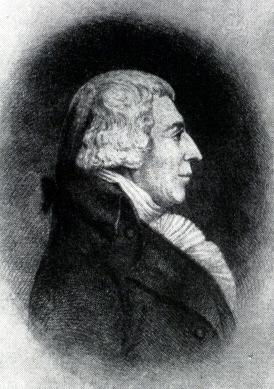
Rep. Richard Dobbs Spaight

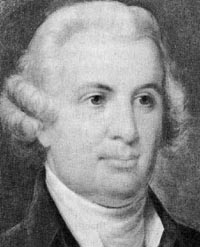
Rep. William Hooper

In 1779, the General Assembly abolished Bute County and Tryon County. They also created eleven new counties: Franklin, Gates, Jones, Lincoln, Montgomery, Randolph, Richmond, Rutherford, Sullivan, Warren, and Wayne Counties. Members of the House of Commons are listed below, along with the county they represented:

County	House of Commons Member
Anson County	Charles Medlock
Anson County	Stephen Miller
Beaufort County	John Kennedy
Beaufort County	Robert Tripp
Bertie County	James Campbell
Bertie County	John Johnston
Bladen County	Samuel Cain
Bladen County	Thomas Brown
Brunswick County	William Dry (possibly)
Brunswick County	(vacant)
Burke County	William Morrison
Burke County	Thomas Whitson
Camden County	Willis Bright
Camden County	Caleb Grandy
Carteret County	John Easton
Carteret County	Solomon Shepperd
Caswell County	Peter Farrow
Caswell County	William Moore
Chatham County	Jonathan Harper
Chatham County	John Luttrell
Chowan County	Thomas Benbury
Chowan County	William Boyd
Craven County	Hardy Bryan
Craven County	Benjamin Williams
Cumberland County	Robert Cochran
Cumberland County	Robert Rowan
Currituck County	John Humphries
Currituck County	Thomas Youngblood
Dobbs County	Jesse Cobb (Note: This Dobbs County seat was declared vacant on May 15, 1779.)
Dobbs County	William Caswell (Note: William Caswell was elected to replace Jesse Cobb. He took office October 20, 1779.)
Dobbs County	Thomas Gray (Note: Thomas Gray's seat was declared vacant on May 15, 1779.)
Dobbs County	Abraham Sheppard (Note: Abrham Sheppard was elected to replace Thomas Gray. He took office on October 20, 1779.)
Duplin County	Richard Clinton
Duplin County	James Gillespie
Edgecombe County	Ethelred Exum (Note: Ethelred Exum died before the second session.)
Edgecombe County	William Haywood (Note: William Haywood was elected to replace Ethelred Exum and served during third session.)
Edgecombe County	William Haywood (Note: William Haywood died in November 1779. There was no replacement.)
Franklin County	Green Hill (Note: Green Hill was elected Halifax district treasurer. His seat was declared vacant on May 15.)
Franklin County	John Norwood (Note: John Norwood was elected to replace Green Hill on October 18, 1779.)
Franklin County	Thomas Sherrod
Granville County	Philemon Hawkins II
Gates County	vacant (Note: Gates County was formed in 1779 from parts of Chowan, Hertford, and Perquimans counties.)
Granville County	Thomas Person
Guilford County	Daniel Gillespie
Guilford County	James Hunter
Halifax County	Willie Jones
Halifax County	Augustine Willis
Hertford County	Arthur Cotton
Hertford County	William Wynns
Hyde County	Joseph Hancock
Hyde County	Benjamin Parmele
Johnston County	Lewis Bryan (Note: Bryan Lewis died in November 1779.)
Johnston County	Phillip Raiford
Jones County	vacant (Note: Jones County was formed in 1779 from the southwestern part of Craven County.)
Lincoln County	vacant (Note: Lincoln County was formed in 1779 from the eastern part of Tryon County.)
Martin County	Samuel Smithwick
Martin County	Samuel Williams
Mecklenburg County	Caleb Phifer
Mecklenburg County	David Wilson
Montgomery County	Solomon Gross
Montgomery County	John Kimbrough
New Hanover County	Timothy Bloodworth
New Hanover County	John A. Campbell
Northampton County	Robert Peebles
Northampton County	James Vaughan
Onslow County	James Howard
Onslow County	Edward Starkey
Orange County	William McCauley
Orange County	Mark Patterson
Pasquotank County	John Blackstock
Pasquotank County	Thomas Riding
Perquimans County	Jonathan Skinner
Perquimans County	John Whedbee
Pitt County	James Gorham
Pitt County	John Williams
Randolph County	Jacob Shepperd
Randolph County	Absolam Tatum (Note: Absolam Tatum was named county clerk of court. His seat was declared vacant on May 8, 1779.)
Randolph County	John Arnold (Note: John Arnold was elected to replace Absolam Tatum. He assumed office on October 15, 1779.)
Richmond County	vacant (Note: Richmond County was formed from Anson County in 1779.)
Richmond County	
Rowan County	Matthew Locke
Rowan County	Moses Winslow
Sullivan County	vacant (Note: Sullivan County was established in 1779 from a portion of Washington County.)
Sullivan County	vacant
Surry County	Gray Bynum
Surry County	Frederick Miller
Tyrrell County	Benjamin Spruill
Tyrrell County	Joshua Swann
Wake County	Thomas Hines
Wake County	John Hinton, Jr.
Warren County	Joseph Hawkins
Warren County	John Macon
Washington District	Henry Clark
Washington District	Jesse Walton
Wayne County	vacant (Note: Wayne County was established in 1779 from the western part of Dobbs County.)
Wayne County	vacant
Wilkes County	Elisha Isaacs
Wilkes County	Benjamin Herndon
Edenton District	Robert Smith
Halifax District	Henry Montford
Hillsborough District	Thomas Tulloch
New Bern District	Richard Cogdell (Note: Richard Cogdell was elected treasurer for the New Bern district.)
New Bern District	Richard Dobbs Spaight (Note: Richard Dobbs Spaight was elected to replace Richard Cogdell. He took office on October 18, 1779.)
Salisbury District	Maxwell Chambers
Wilmington District	William Hooper

== Senate ==
=== Senate leadership ===
- Speaker: Allen Jones (Northampton County), resigned October 25, 1779; Abner Nash, elected to replace Jones October 26, 1779
- Clerk: John Sitgreaves (Craven County)

=== Members of the senate ===
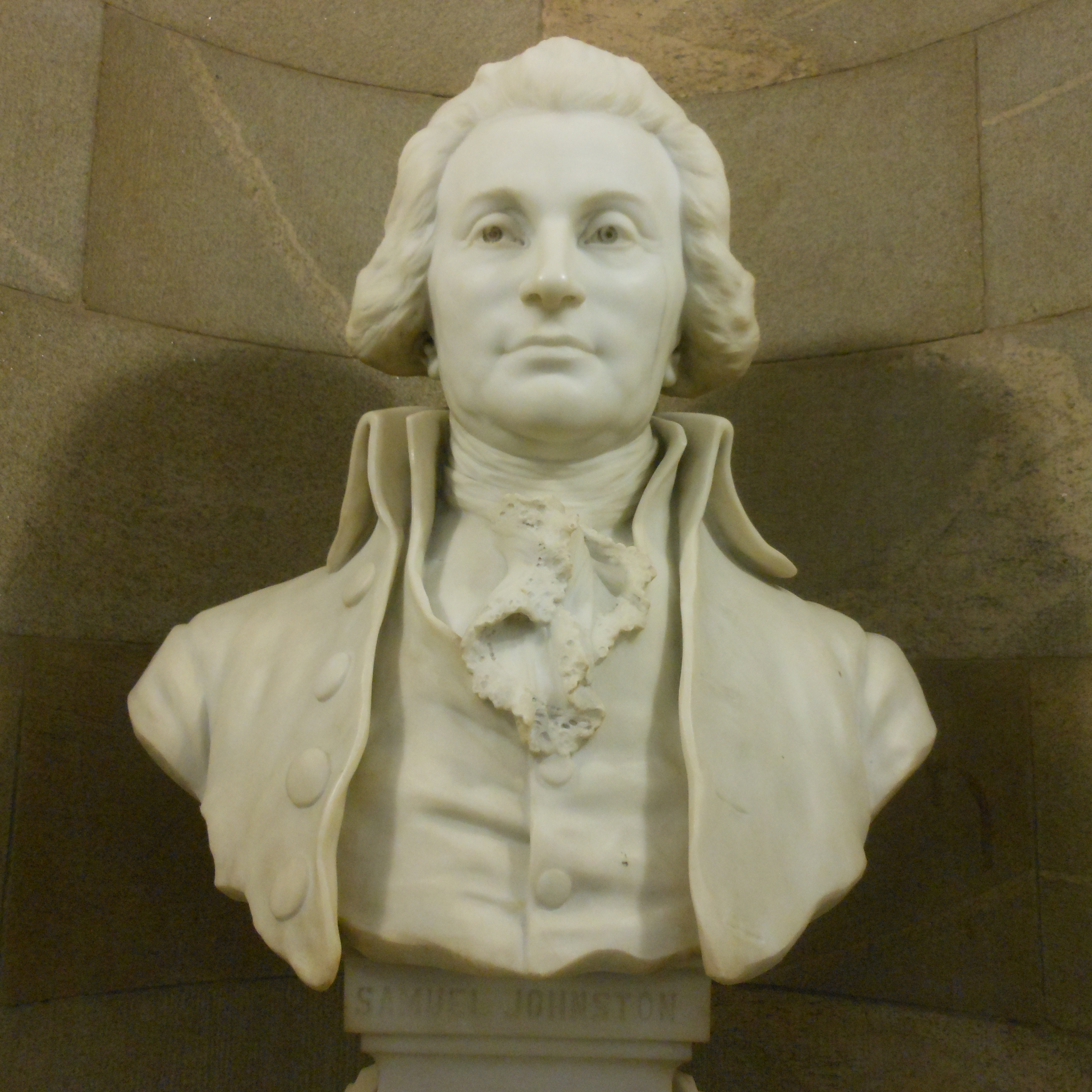
Sen. Samuel Johnston

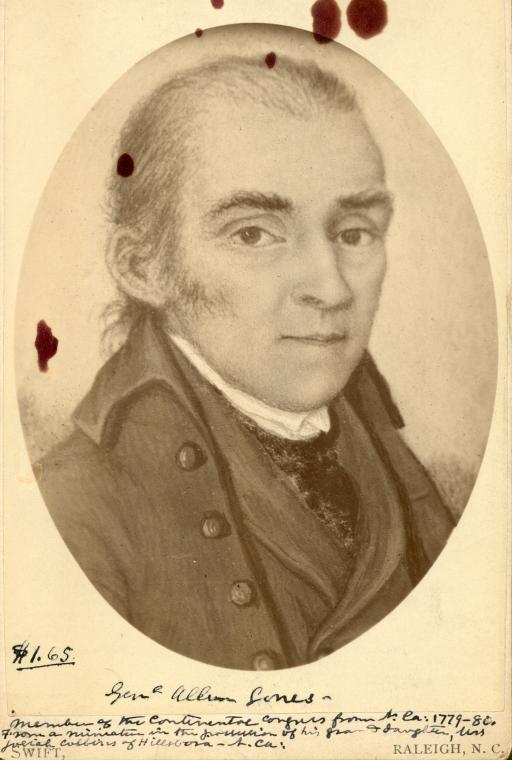
Sen. Allen Jones

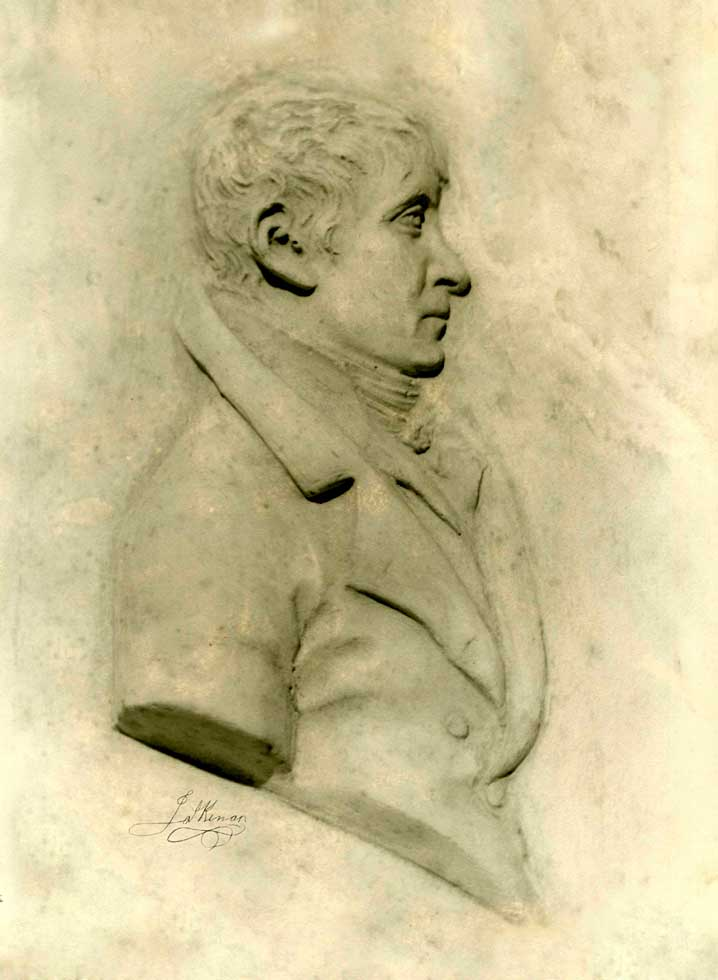
Sen. James Kenan

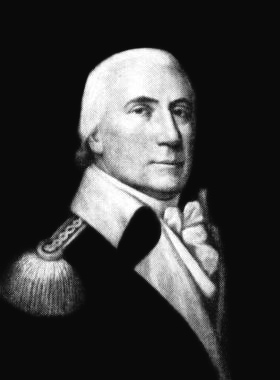
Sen. Alexander Martin

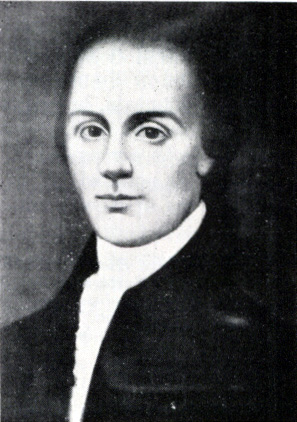
Sen. Abner Nash

Members of the senate and counties they represented included the following

County	Senate Member
Anson County	John Childs
Beaufort County	Thomas Respess
Bertie County	Jasper Carlton
Bladen County	Thomas Owen
Brunswick County	(vacant)
Burke County	Ephraim McLean
Camden County	John Gray
Carteret County	William Thompson
Caswell County	James Saunders
Chatham County	Ambrose Ramsey
Chowan County	Samuel Johnston
Craven County	James Coor
Cumberland County	(vacant)
Currituck County	Solomon Perkins (Note: Although Solomon Perkins was elected, there is no evidence of service in the minutes.)
Dobbs County	Benjamin Exum
Duplin County	James Kenan
Edgecombe County	Elisha Battle
Franklin County	Benjamin Seawell
Gates County	(vacant)
Granville County	Memucan Hunt
Guilford County	Alexander Martin
Halifax County	Oroondate Davis
Hertford County	George Wynn
Hyde County	William Russell
Johnston County	Samuel Smith
Jones County	Abner Nash
Lincoln County	William Graham
Martin County	(unknown)
Mecklenburg County	Kenneth McKenzie
Montgomery County	(vacant)
New Hanover County	Nathan Boddie
Northampton County	Allen Jones (Note: Allen Jones was elected to the Continental Congress. He resigned as senator on October 25, 1779.)
Northampton County	Samuel Lockhart (Note: Samuel Lockhart was elected to replace Allen Jones. He served during the third session.)
Onslow County	Henry Rhodes
Orange County	John Hogan
Pasquotank County	Thomas Relfe
Perquimans County	Thomas Harvey
Pitt County	Edward Salter
Randolph County	John Collier
Richmond County	(vacant)
Rowan County	Griffith Rutherford
Sullivan County	(vacant)
Surry County	William Shepperd
Tyrrell County	Jeremiah Frazier
Wake County	John Rand
Warren County	John Faulcon
Washington District	Charles Roberson
Wayne County	(vacant)
Wilkes County	Benjamin Cleveland

== See also ==
- List of North Carolina state legislatures
