= North Carolina General Assembly of 1777 =

1777 meeting of the North Carolina General Assembly

←	5th Provincial Congress	1778	→
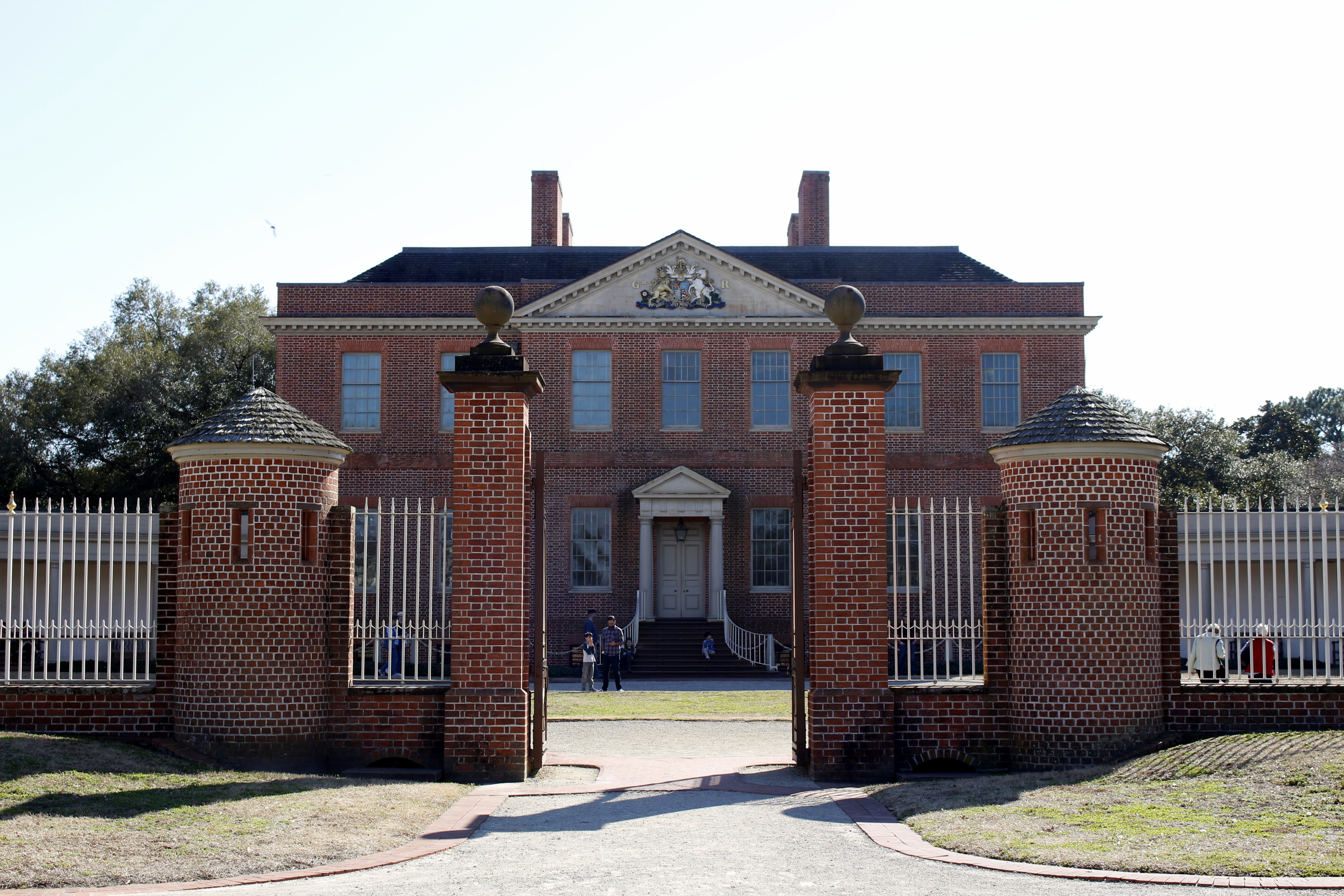
- Governor's Palace, Newbern

Overview
- Legislative body: North Carolina General Assembly
- Jurisdiction: North Carolina, United States
- Meeting place: New Bern, North Carolina
- Term: 1777

North Carolina Senate
- Members: 39 Senators (38 counties, one district)
- Speaker: Samuel Ashe
- Clerk: James Green, Jr.

North Carolina House of Commons
- Members: 76 Representatives from 38 counties, 6 from districts
- Speaker: Abner Nash
- Clerk: Benjamin Exum

Sessions
- 1st: April 7, 1777 – May 9, 1777
- 2nd: November 15, 1777 – December 24, 1777

The North Carolina General Assembly of 1777 met in two sessions in New Bern, North Carolina, from April 7 to May 9, 1777, and from November 15 to December 24, 1777. This was the first North Carolina legislature elected after the last provincial congress wrote the first North Carolina Constitution. This assembly elected Richard Caswell as the state's first constitutional governor (he had been serving as acting governor by action of the provincial congress).

Each of the 38 counties of North Carolina were authorized to elect one senator and two representatives to the House of Commons. In addition, six boroughs (also called districts) elected one House member each. An additional district, Washington District, had one senator and no representative in the House of Commons. Washington District comprised the lands that later became part of Tennessee in 1789. It was referred to as a District in 1776 and 1777 and Washington County after 1777.

== History ==
The North Carolina Constitution of 1776 created a strong legislature and a weak executive. The constitution created a bicameral legislature consisting of a Senate made up of one representative from each county and a House of Commons with two members from each county and one member from each of seven designated districts, including Washington District. House members had to own at least 100 acres of land and Senate members had to own at least 300 acres of land. Members were not paid for their services. The governor was chosen annually. Thus, Richard Caswell was chosen the first governor of the State of North Carolina. The governor had no veto power and little control over patronage, He could not convene, prorogue, or dissolve the legislature.

Members of the legislature were elected by popular vote annually. As such, they were the only state officials elected by popular vote. The constitution allowed that "all freemen of the age of twenty-one years, who have been inhabitants of any one county within this State twelve months immediately preceding the day of any election, and shall have paid public taxes shall be entitled to vote for members of the House of Commons for the county in which he resides". It also allowed "that all freemen, of the age of twenty-one years, who have been inhabitants of any one county within the State twelve months immediately preceding the day of any election and possessed of a freehold within the same county of fifty acres of land for six months next before, and at the day of election, shall be entitled to vote for a member of the Senate." Restrictions were placed on voting for town or district members, i.e. "That all persons possessed of a freehold in any town in this State, having a right of representation and also all freemen who have been inhabitants of any such town twelve mouths next before and at the day of election, and shall have paid public taxes, shall be entitled to vote for a member to represent such town in the House of Commons: -- Provided always, That this section shall not entitle any inhabitant of such town to vote for members of the House of Commons, for the county in which he may reside, nor any freeholder in such county, who resides without or beyond the limits of such town, to vote for a member for said town.

The Constitution of 1776 required the General Assembly to "appoint judges of the Supreme Courts of Law and Equity, Judges of Admiralty, and Attorney-General," who were commissioned by the Governor and held office during good behavior. Acting under this authority, the General Assembly in 1776 divided the State into six judicial districts. Under the act of 1777 three judges, Samuel Ashe, Samuel Spencer, and James Iredell, were chosen.

The General Assembly of 1777 was also responsible for electing Councilors of State. They elected the following councilors on April 18, 1777:

- William Cray from Onslow County
- William Haywood from Edgecombe County
- Joseph Leech from Craven County
- Edward Starkey from Onslow County
- Thomas Eaton from Bute County
- Cornelius Harnett from New Hanover County (Note: Vacated upon election to the Continental Congress, 1777–1780)
- William Taylor from Duplin County

The General Assembly of 1777 elected James Glasgow from Dobbs County as North Carolina Secretary of State.

From 1777 to 1779, the State was divided into two districts, Northern and Southern, each with a treasurer. John Ashe from New Hannover County was elected treasurer of the Southern District. Samuel Johnston from Chowan County was elected treasurer of the Northern District but declined to serve, so William Skinner was elected.

Waightstill Avery from Burke County was elected Attorney-General by the 1777 legislature.

The General Assembly of 1777 elected the following Judges of the Superior Court: James Iredell (1777–1778, Samuel Ashe (1777–1795), and Samuel Spencer (1777–1794).

The constitution gave the Senate and House of Commons the power to appoint the generals and field-officers of the militia, and all officers of the regular army of this State.

The following counties were created in 1777 by the legislature: Burke, Camden, Caswell, Nash, and Wilkes counties.

== Legislative accomplishments ==
The following acts were passed by the General Assembly of 1777 during the first session: (Note: Original spelling is used.)

1. An Act to establish a militia
2. An Act for levying a tax by general assement, and other purposes
3. An Act establishing what crimes and practices against the state shall be considered treason.
4. An Act concerning oaths.
5. An Act for punishment of such persons who shall procure or commit wilful perjury
6. An Act to prevent domestic insurrections and other such purposes
7. An Act for encouragement of the militia and volunteers employed in prosecuting the present Indian War
8. An Act for the appointment of registers in the several counties in this State
9. An Act to empower the Justice of Bladen County to take into the possession the Records of said County, now in possession of Maturin Colvill
10. An Act for the relief of such person who have or may suffer by their deeds mean conveyances not being proved and registered with the time heretofore appointed by law
11. An Act for establishing fairs in the town of Halifax, Halifax County
12. An Act for enlarging the time of saving lots in the town of Windsor, in Bertie County
13. An Act for appointing commissioners for building a court-house, prison, and stocks for the county of Tryon
14. An Act for appointing commissioners to finish the building of court-house, prison and stocks in the County of Guilford
15. An Act for establishing a town on the lands of John Smith in Johnston County, and other purposes
16. An Act for the regulation of the town of Hillsborough
17. An Act for establishing a new county between Hillsborough and the Virginia Line, by erecting the Northern Part of Orange County into a distinct county, by the name of Caswell
18. An Act for dividing the county of Pasquotank, and establishing that part thereof on the North East side of Pasquotank River a county, by the name of Camden
19. An Act for dividing Rowan County, and other purposes therein mentioned
20. An Act for incorporating the President and Trustees of Liberty Hall (Academy), in the County of Mecklenburg
21. An Act to prevent hunting with a gun, by fire light in the night
22. An Act to prevent forging or counterfeiting, and punish such persons as shall forge or counterfeit, or pass or vend, knowing the same to be forge or counterfeit, any of the lottery tickets of the United States, and other purposes
23. An Act for confirming an Act, entitled an Act to amend an Act, instituted an Act what fences are sufficient, and to amend and continue an Act relating to taking up stray horses
24. An Act for ascertaining the salary of the Governor, and other purposes therein mentioned
25. An Act for enforcing the Statute Laws and such parts of the Common Law and Acts of Assembly heretofore in use here, and also for enforcing the resolves of Conventions and Congresses of this State, which have not had their effect, and for other purposes therein mentioned.
26. An Act to establish courts for the trial of criminals in each District within the State, and for vesting in the several County Courts and Sessions of the Peace, the Power of appointing Jurymen for the said District Cours and Constituting Judges to preside therein.
27. An Act to establish courts for the trial of Criminals in each District within this State, and for vesting in the several County Courts and Sessions of the Peace, the Power of appointing jurymen for the said district courts and constituting judges to preside therein.
28. An Act for erecting county courts and sessions of the peace and also or appointing and commissioning justices of the peace and sheriffs in and for the several counties and District of Washington within this State and for other purposes therein mentioned.

During the second session, the following acts were approved:

1. An Act for establishing offices, for receiving entries of claims for lands in the several counties within this State, for ascertaining the method of obtaining titles to the same, and for other purposes wherein mentioned.
2. An Act establishing courts of law, and for regulating the proceedings therein.
3. An Act to regulate and ascertain the fees of clerks in the Superior and County Courts, Justices of the Peace, and Attornies, in this State, and directing the method of paying the same.
4. An Act directing the method of electing members of the General Assembly, and other Purpose.
5. An Act for directing the method of appointing jurors in all causes, civil and criminal.
6. An Act to amend an Act for declaring what crimes and practices against the State shall be Treason, and what shall be Misprison of Treason, and providing punishments adequate to crimes of both classes, and for preventing the dangers which may arise from persons disaffected to the State.
7. An Act for making provision for the poor, and for other purposes.
8. An Act for appointing Sheriffs, and directing their duty in office, and for obliging the late Sheriffs and Collectors of Public Monies who are in arrear, to account for and pay the same, and other purposes.
9. An Act to prevent abuses in taking up stray horses, cattle, hogs and sheep, and other things therein mentioned.
10. An Act for ascertaining the Oath of Allegiance and Abjuration.
11. An Act for appointing Naval Officers in the different ports of this State, and directing their duty in office.
12. An Act to amend the staple of tobacco, and prevent frauds.
13. An Act for amending an Act, instituted, an Act for levying a tax by assessment and other purposes passed the last session of this assembly.
14. An Act to enforce such parts of the statute of Common Laws as have been heretofore in force and use here, and the Acts of Assembly made and passed when this Territory was under the Government of the Late Proprietors, and the Crown of Great Britain; and for reviving the several Acts therein mentioned.
15. An Act to amend an Act, instituted, an Act to establish a militia in this State.
16. An Act to impower the Court of Admiralty of this State to have Jurisdiction in all cases of capture of the ships and other vessels of the inhabitants and subjects of Great Britain, to establish the Trial by Jury in the said court in cases of capture.
17. An Act, for confiscating the property of all such person as are inimical to the United States, and of such persons as shall not, within a certain time therein mentioned appear and submit to the State whether they shall be received as citizens thereof, and of such persons as shall so appear and shall not be admitted as citizens, and for other purposes therein mentioned.
18. An Act to regulate the pilotage of Cape Fear and Occacock Bars, and the rivers leading from the same to Brunswick, Wilmington, New Bern, Bath and Edenton.
19. An Act to enable the governor to send an aid from the militia to oppose the enemies of the United States, if the same shall be requested by Congress.
20. An Act for establishing the salaries of the justices of the Superior Courts, and of the Attorney General.
21. An Act for establishing a loan office in this State.
22. An Act declaring what fences are sufficient, and to provide a remedy for abuses.
23. An Act to encourage the building of public mills, and directing the duty of millers.
24. An Act to encourage the destroying vermin in the several counties of this State.
25. An Act to prevent burning the woods.
26. An Act for levying a tax for the year one thousand seven hundred and seventy-eight.
27. An Act for appointing commissioners to lay off and mark a road from the court house in the County of Washington, through the mountains, into the County of Burke.
28. An Act to facilitate the navigation of Port Currituck.
29. An Act to impower the coursts for the Counties of Tryon and Guilford to lay a tax by assessment, for finishing the court-houses, prison and stocks, in the said counties; and also to impower the several counties in the District of Wilmington to levy taxes for building a District Gaol, and Gaoler's house, in the town of Wilmington, and other purposes.
30. An Act for dividing Edcombe County, and other purposes therein mentioned.
31. An Act for erecting the District of Washington into a county, by the name of Washington County.
32. An Act for erecting part of the county of Surry, and part of the District of Washington, into a separate and distinct County, by the name of Wilkes.
33. An Act for adding part of the County of Duplin to Johnston.
34. An Act for erecting a prison in the Town of Edenton, for the use of the District of Edenton.
35. An Act to ratify and confirm an Act, instituted, an Act for the Regulation of the Town of Wilmington; also to revive an Act, instituted, an Act for the Regulation of the Town of Wilmington.
36. An Act for levying a tax for defraying the contingencies of the several counties in this State, and other purposes.
37. An Act for securing lots in Elizabeth Town, in Bladen County.
38. An Act for adding part of Brunswick County to Bladen, and part of Bladen to Brunswick County.
39. An Act for building a court house in the Town of Salisbury, for the District of Salisbury.
40. An Act for laying a tax to defray the expence of the public buildings in the County of Burke, and other purposes therein mentioned.
41. An Act to amend an Act, passed the last session of this assembly, instituted, an Act for establishing a new County between Hillsborough and the Virginia Line, by erecting the Northern part of Orange County into a distinct County, by the name of Caswell.
42. An Act for adding part of Anson County to Bladen.
43. An Act for impowering commissioners to build a prison and stocks in the County of Duplin, and other purposes therein mentioned.
44. An Act to ratify an Act, instituted, an Act for the better regulation of the Town of New Bern, and for securing the titles of persons who hold lots in the said town; also to ratify an Act, instituted, an Act for the better regulation of the Town of New Bern, and for securing the titles of persons who hold lots in the said town; also to ratify an Act, instituted, an Act for amending an Act, instituted, an Act for the better regulation of the Town of New Bern, and for securing the titles of person who hold lots in the said town.
45. An Act for the regulation of the Town of Edenton.

== House of Commons ==
=== House of Commons leadership ===
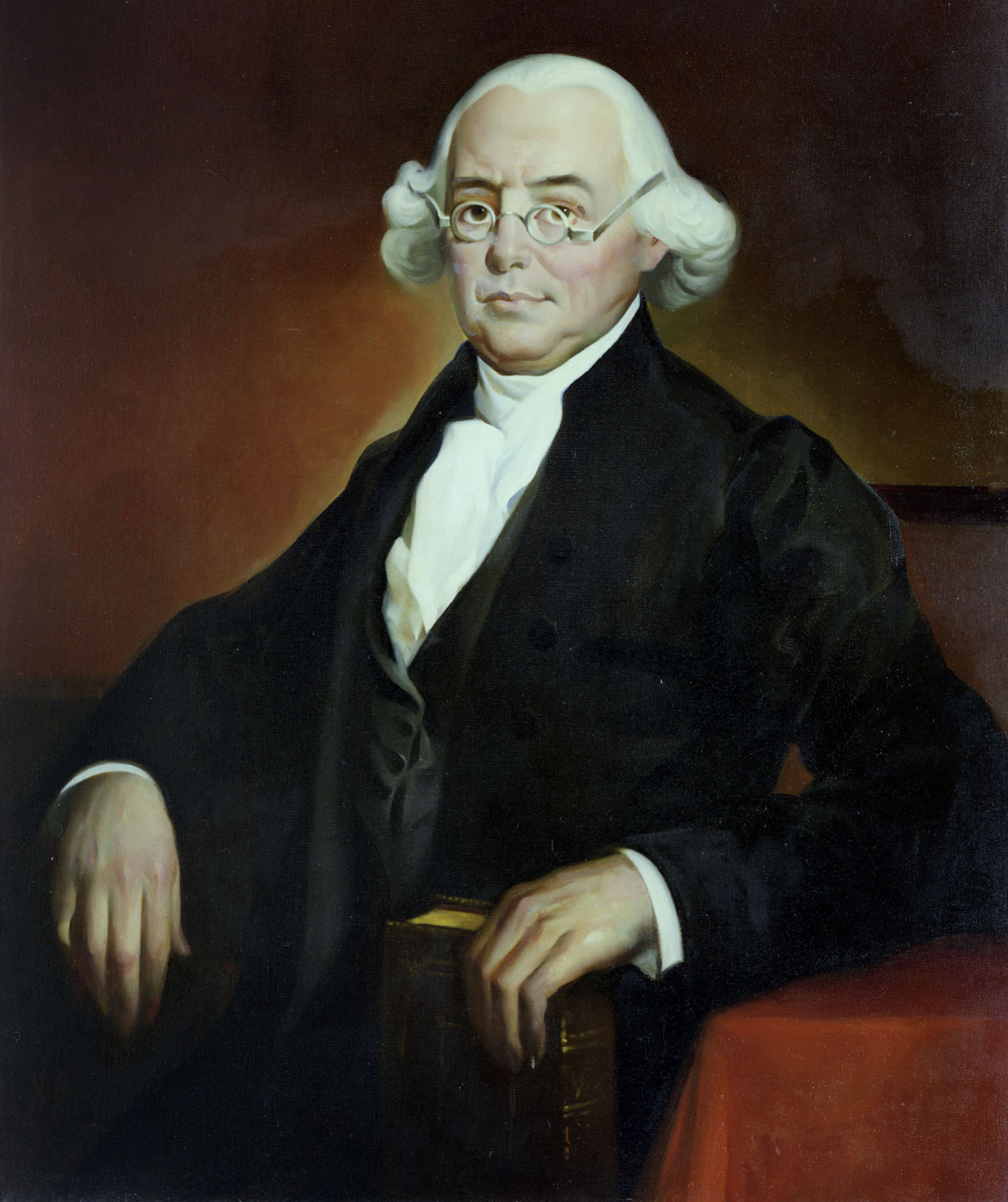
Rep. James Wilson

Rep. John Penn

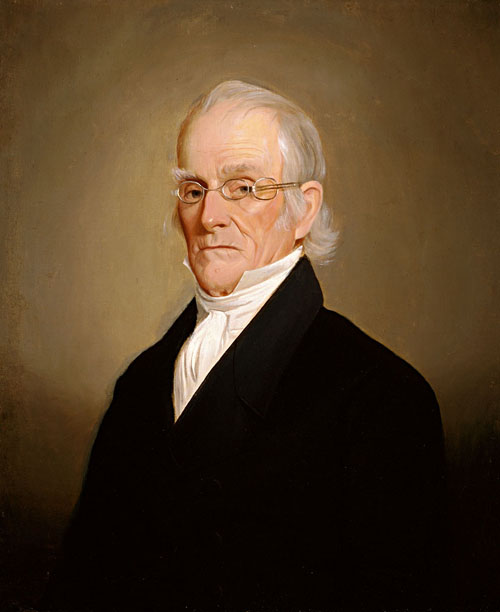
Rep. Nathaniel Rochester

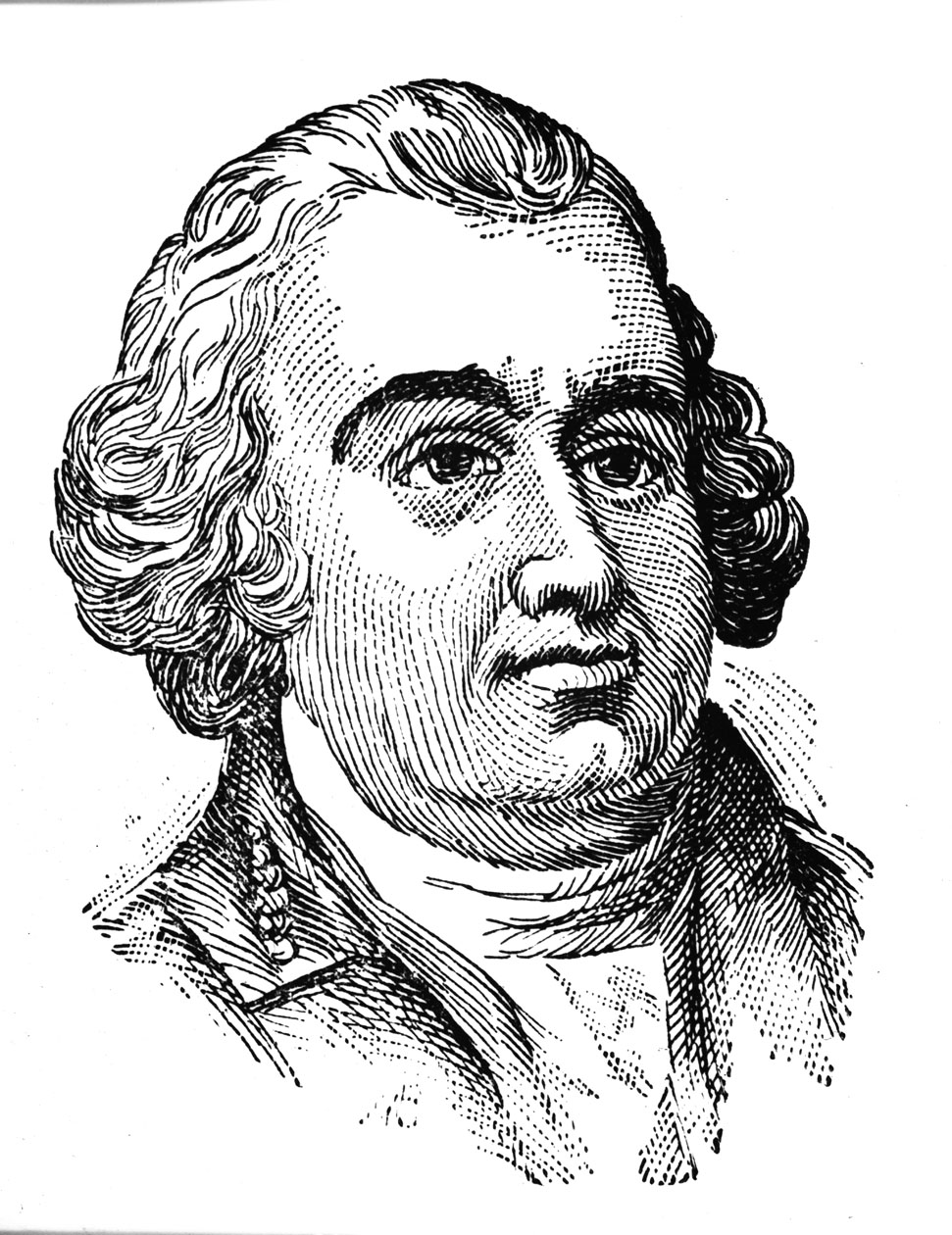
Rep. Thomas Burke

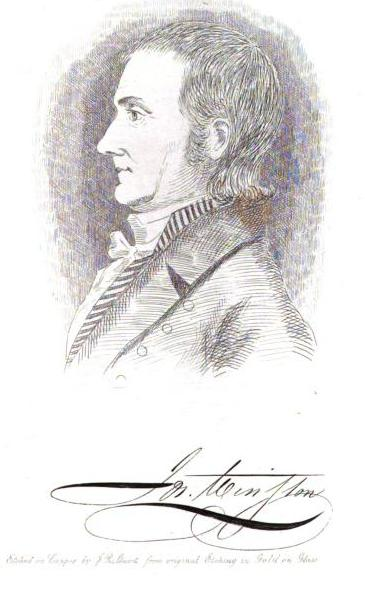
Rep. Joseph Winston

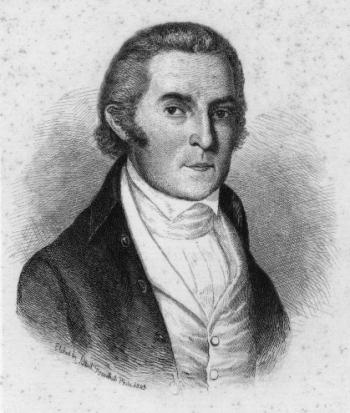
Rep Willie Jones

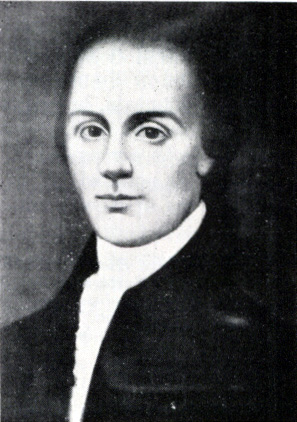
Rep. Abner Nash

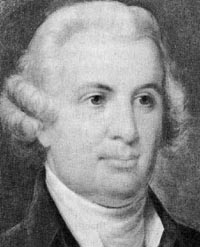
Rep. William Hooper

- Speaker: Abner Nash (New Bern)
- Clerk: Benjamin Exum (Dobbs County)

=== House of Commons members ===
The following list shows the names of the house members and the counties or districts that they represented

County	House of Commons Member
Anson County	George Davidson
Anson County	William R. Pickett
Beaufort County	Alderson Ellison (Note: Alderson Ellison was elected but out of the country.)
Beaufort County	Nathan Keas (Note: Nathan Keas was elected to replace Alderson Ellison. He took office on December 4, 1777.)
Beaufort County	William Brown
Bertie County	Zedekiah Stone
Bertie County	Simon Turner
Bladen County	Thomas Owen
Bladen County	John Turner
Brunswick County	William Lord
Brunswick County	Richard Quince, Jr.
Burke County	Ephraim McLean
Burke County	James Wilson
Bute County	Green Hill
Bute County	Benjamin Ward
Camden County	Caleb Granby (Note: Caleb Granby took office on December 8, 1777.)
Camden County	Thomas Humphries (Note: Thomas Humphries took office on December 8, 1777.)
Carteret County	Brice Williams
Carteret County	Thomas Chadwick
Caswell County	John Atkinson
Caswell County	Richard Moore
Chatham County	John Birdsong
Chatham County	Mial Scurlock (Note: Mial Scurlock was elected county clerk, so his seat was declared vacant on November 15, 1777.)
Chowan County	Thomas Benbury
Chowan County	Jacob Hunter
Craven County	Nathan Bryan
Craven County	John Tillman
Cumberland County	William Rand (Note: William Rand was elected county clerk. His seat was declared vacant on November 15, 1777.)
Cumberland County	Philip Alston
Currituck County	James Ryan
Currituck County	James White
Dobbs County	Andrew Bass
Dobbs County	Jesse Cobb
Duplin County	Richard Clinton
Duplin County	Robert Dixon
Edgecombe County	Nathan Boddie
Edgecombe County	Jonas Johnston
Granville County	John Penn (Note: Member of the Continental Congress, 1775–1776, 1777–1780)
Granville County	Thomas Person
Guilford County	John Collier
Guilford County	Robert Lindsay
Halifax County	Egbert Haywood
Halifax County	Joseph John Williams
Hertford County	Joseph Dickenson
Hertford County	James Garrett
Hyde County	John Jordan (Note: John Jordan was elected county clerk, so his seat was declared vacant on November 15, 1777.)
Hyde County	Joseph Hancock (Note: Joseph Hancock was elected to replace John Jordan. He took office on December 11, 1777.)
Hyde County	Benjamin Parmely
Johnston County	Alexander Averet
Johnston County	Henry Rains
Martin County	Whitmell Hill (Note: Member of the Continental Congress, 1778–1781)
Martin County	William Slade
Mecklenburg County	Waightstill Avery
Mecklenburg County	Martin Phifer
New Hanover County	Alexander Lillington
New Hanover County	Samuel Swann
Northampton County	Jeptha Atherton (Note: Jeptha Atherton was elected county clerk, so his seat was declared vacant on November 15, 1777.)
Northampton County	Robert Peebles (Note: Robert Peebles was elected to replace Jeptha Atherton. He took office on December 6, 1777.)
Northampton County	Howell Edmunds
Onslow County	John King
Onslow County	Henry Rhodes
Orange County	John Butler
Orange County	Nathaniel Rochester (Note: Nathaniel Rochester was elected county clerk, so his seat was declared vacant on November 15, 1777.)
Orange County	Thomas Burke (Note: Thomas Burke was elected to replace Nathaniel Rochester. He took office on December 1, 1777.) (Note: Member of the Continental Congress, 1777–1781)
Pasquotank County	James Ferebee (Note: James Ferebee died before the second session.)
Pasquotank County	Thomas Harvey (Note: Thomas Harvey was elected to replace James Ferebee. He took office on December 4, 1777.)
Pasquotank County	Thomas Relfe
Perquimans County	Jesse Eason
Perquimans County	Benjamin Harvey
Pitt County	William Robeson
Pitt County	John Williams
Rowan County	Matthew Locke
Rowan County	James Smith
Surry County	Charles Gordon
Surry County	Joseph Winston
Tryon County	Andrew Neel
Tryon County	John Barber
Tyrrell County	John Hooker
Tyrrell County	Benjamin Spruill
Wake County	John Rice (Note: John Rice was elected county clerk, so his seat was declared vacant on November 15, 1777.)
Wake County	John Rand (Note: John Rand was elected to replace John Rice. He took office on December 5, 1777.)
Wake County	Thomas Wooten (Note: Thomas Wooten was elected county sheriff, so his seat was declared vacant on November 15, 1777.)
Wake County	Tignal Jones (Note: Tignal Jones was elected to replace Wooton. He took office on December 6, 1777.)
Edenton District	John Green
Halifax District	Willie Jones (Note: Member of the Continental Congress, 1780–1781)
Hillsborough District	William Courtney
New Bern District	Abner Nash
Salisbury District	David Nisbitt
Wilmington District	William Hooper (Note: Member of the Continental Congress, 1774–1777)

== Senate ==
=== Senate leadership ===
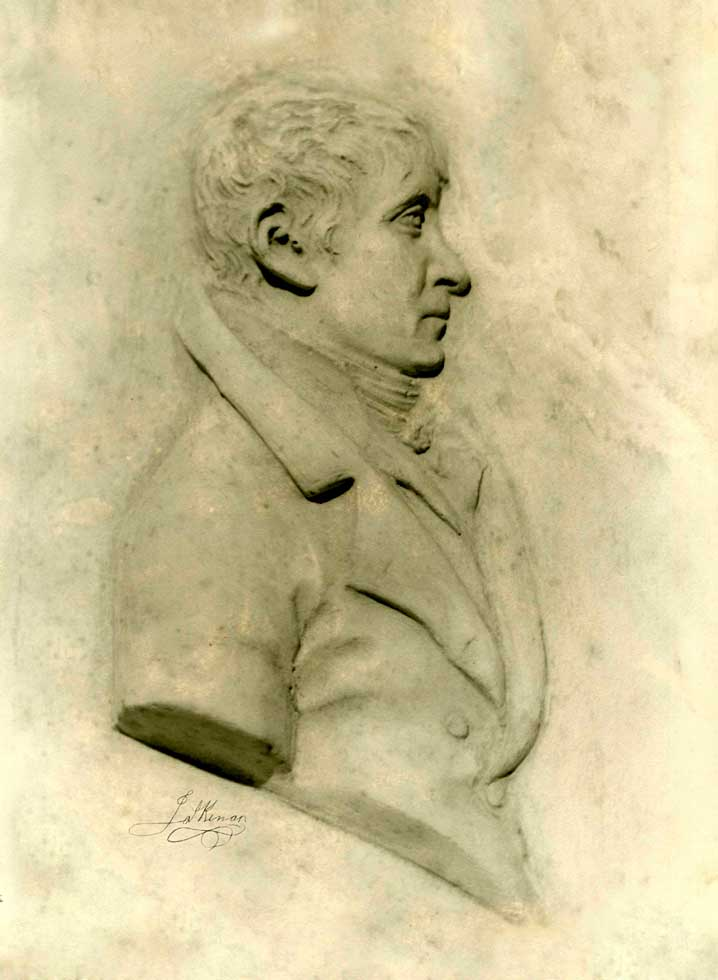
Sen. James Kenan

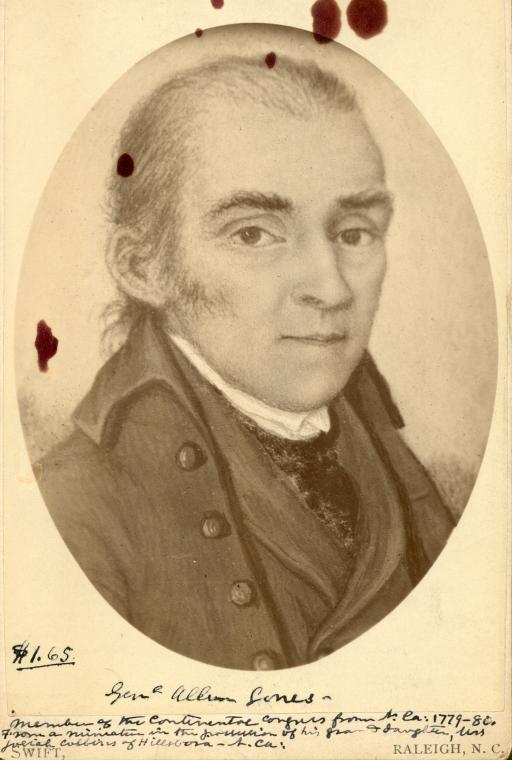
Sen. Allen Jones

- President pro Tempore: Samuel Ashe (New Hanover County)
- Clerk: James Green, Jr. (Craven County)

=== Senators ===
The following Senators served in this assembly:

County	Senate Member
Anson County	David Love
Beaufort County	Thomas Respess
Bertie County	John Campbell
Bladen County	Thomas Robeson
Brunswick County	Archibald Maclaine
Burke County	Charles McDowell
Bute County	Benjamin Seawell
Camden County	John Gray
Carteret County	James Parrot
Caswell County	James Saunders
Chatham County	Ambrose Ramsey
Chowan County	Luke Sumner
Craven County	James Coor
Cumberland County	David Smith
Currituck County	Samuel Jarvis
Dobbs County	Benjamin Exum
Duplin County	James Kenan
Edgecombe County	Elisha Battle
Granville County	Memucan Hunt
Guilford County	Ralph Gorrell
Halifax County	John Bradford
Hertford County	Robert Sumner
Hyde County	William Russell
Johnston County	Needham Bryan
Martin County	William Williams
Mecklenburg County	John McKnitt Alexander
New Hanover County	Samuel Ashe
Northampton County	Allen Jones (Note: Member of the Continental Congress, 1779–1780)
Onslow County	William Cray (Note: William Cray left office and he was replaced by John Spicer.)
Onslow County	John Spicer (Note: John Spicer replaced William Cray on December 8, 1777.)
Orange County	Thomas Hart
Pasquotank County	Joseph Jones
Perquimans County	William Skinner (Note: William Skinner was appointed state treasurer, so he resigned his seat.)
Pitt County	Robert Salter
Rowan County	Griffith Rutherford
Surry County	Robert Lanier
Tryon County	Charles McLean
Tyrrell County	Archibald Currie
Wake County	James Jones (Note: James Jones resigned after the first session.)
Wake County	Michael Rogers (Note: Michael Rogers was elected and took office on November 15, 1777.)
Washington District	John Carter

== See also ==
- List of North Carolina state legislatures

== Notes ==
General notes:

House notes:

Senate notes:
