= Benjamin Herndon =

Member of the North Carolina militia in the American Revolution

- Born: December 10, 1740; Caroline County, Colony of Virginia
- Died: December 30, 1819 (aged 79); Newberry County, South Carolina, US
- Burial place: Herndon Family Cemetery, Whitmire, Newberry County, South Carolina, US
- Spouse(s): Sarah Pines, Patience Terry
- Military career
- Allegiance: United States
- Branch: North Carolina militia
- Service years: 1775–1783
- Rank: Colonel
- Units: Surry County Regiment, Wilkes County Regiment, North Carolina Light Dragoons Regiment
- Commands: Wilkes County Regiment
- Conflicts: Battle of Moore's Creek Bridge, Battle of Colson's Mill, Battle of Kings Mountain, Battle of Guilford Courthouse

Benjamin Herndon (1749–1819) was a colonel in the Wilkes County Regiment, a Patriot unit of the North Carolina militia in the American Revolution. After the war, he was elected to represent Wilkes County, North Carolina in the state legislature: twice as a senator and twice as a member of the house. After 1790, he moved with his family to Newberry County, South Carolina where he built a plantation called "Mollihon".

== Biography ==
He was born in Drysdale Parish, Caroline County, Colony of Virginia on December 10, 1749. His parents were Joseph Herndon and Mary Boswell Herndon. He was one of six children. His father died in 1757 and Charles Gordon became the guardian of the children when he was eight years old. Benjamin married Sarah Pines on February 23, 1769. They lived in Culpeper County, Virginia in the first few years of their marriage. Benjamin sold his land in Virginia and moved to Wilkes County, North Carolina in about 1775 where they resided for the next 15 years on their plantation (Horseshoe) near what would become Ronda, North Carolina.

=== Military service ===
In 1775, he was commissioned a lieutenant in the Surry County Regiment of the North Carolina militia and fought at the Battle of Moore's Creek Bridge on February 27, 1776, in North Carolina. In 1778, he was promoted to captain and served in the Wilkes County Regiment of the North Carolina militia. He was in the Battle of Colson's Mill on July 21, 1780, under Colonel William Lee Davidson of the Mecklenburg County Regiment. In the Spring of 1781, he was assigned to the North Carolina Light Dragoons Regiment. Later in 1781, he was commissioned as a major in the Wilkes County Regiment of the North Carolina militia. He was also promoted to full colonel in the Wilkes County Regiment in 1781, taking the place of Colonel Benjamin Cleveland, who vacated his command after being elected an official in the North Carolina General Assembly.

=== After the war ===
After the war, he represented Wilkes County in the North Carolina General Assembly's House of Commons (North Carolina General Assembly of October 1784 and North Carolina General Assembly of 1779); and twice as a senator (North Carolina General Assembly of 1785 and North Carolina General Assembly of 1786-1787. He was the first justice for Wilkes County and also Entry Taker for the county.

The Herndon family left Wilkes County after 1790 and travelled to the banks of the Enoree River in South Carolina to their 1,000 acres in Ninety-Six District, Newberry County. There Benjamin Herndon built his home, called "Mollihon". This home was built with slave labor and was still standing in 1957. His wife, Sarah, died in 1798. Benjamin married a second time in 1799 to Patience Terry. He died on December 30, 1819, at Mollihon. He was buried in the family burial ground at Mollihon next to his first wife. His second wife, Patience, died in 1823.

Benjamin had the following children, according to his will: Joseph, Stephen, Benjamin, Zachariah, John Newton, Mary Boswell (Herndon) Lewis, Francis (Herndon) McKie, Elizabeth (Herndon) Farrow, Sally (Herndon) Rice, Barbara Asbury (Herndon) Johnson, Nancy Coke (Herndon) Rice, Rebecca Ellis (Herndon) Reid, Patsy M. Harriet Herndon, and Lucy Boswell Herndon.
