= Hall STEAM Magnet High School =

Public school in Little Rock, Arkansas, US

Location
- 6700 H Street; Little Rock, Arkansas 72205; United States; 34°45′35″N 92°20′50″W

Information
- Type: Public
- Established: 1957 (69 years ago)
- School district: Little Rock School District
- CEEB code: 041423
- NCES School ID: 050900001688
- Principal: Carlton McGee
- Faculty: 25.82 (on FTE basis)
- Grades: 9–12
- Enrollment: 305 (2023-2024)
- Student to teacher ratio: 11.81
- Colors: Orange, white and blue
- Mascot: Warrior
- Team name: Hall Warriors
- Website: www.lrsd.org/o/hall

Hall STEAM Magnet High School, formerly Hall High School, is an accredited public high school located in Little Rock, Arkansas, United States. It is a part of the Little Rock School District (LRSD).

Prior to its conversion to an all magnet school in 2020, Hall was one of five comprehensive four-year public high schools in the LRSD enrolling students in grades nine through twelve.

== History ==
Opened in late 1957 as the city's second white high school, Hall High School started with student body of about 700. It was named for Col. Robert Cleveland "R.C." Hall, Superintendent of the Little Rock School District from 1909 to 1941. As a result of the school opening, Little Rock High School was renamed to Little Rock Central High School.

In 2020 it became a magnet school only, with Little Rock Southwest High School taking its attendance boundary. That year it had grades 10-12 and had 401 students; it will get the 9th grade later.

== Facilities ==
Hall's classic performing arts auditorium, the home of the Arkansas Symphony Orchestra from September 1972 to April 1973, still serves as a site for community events and performances. Hall High School received additions in 1962, 1963, 1971, 1975 and 1984.

The two newest buildings opened in 2003: a new classroom wing (Zone 8) and a new gymnasium/athletic center (officially named "Cirks Arena" in 2010 to honor George Cirks, basketball coach and dean of students). The Dietz Physical Development Center officially was dedicated in January 2005 and was named to honor Donald Dietz, a Hall High graduate and West Point alumnus who was killed in Vietnam in 1969.

== Academics ==
=== Accreditation ===
Hall is accredited by AdvancED (formerly The North Central Association of Colleges and Schools) since 1958 and holds membership in the College Board. It remains one of only three Arkansas public schools admitted (1963) to the National Cum Laude Society, the high school equivalent of Phi Beta Kappa.

=== College coursework ===
At Hall High, college courses are offered through a partnership (University Studies) with the University of Arkansas at Little Rock (UALR). Currently, Hall offers 12 college courses, representing a total of 40 college credit hours. Also offered is Comp I, Comp II, Biology, Speech Communication, Intro to Sociology, Physics I, Physics II, US History I, US History II, Intro to Psychology, College Algebra, Evolutionary and Environmental Biology.

Students receive college credit (in addition to high school credit) for all of these courses. Students receive "grants-in-aid" from UALR which result in a 50% reduction in tuition costs. Textbooks are currently provided at no cost to students by the Little Rock School District. Additionally, professors from UALR are onsite with Hall teachers at the school.

=== Vocational training ===
Another unique program for Hall High in the LRSD is the Cisco Academy. Internetworking Technologies is a four semester hands-on curriculum prescribed by the Cisco Systems. At the end of the fourth semester, students take a certification test which is recognized throughout the computer industry. This curriculum is open to 10th, 11th, and 12th grade students. Cisco Networking Academy prepares students to take the CCNA certification exam. Cisco provides the background needed for success in the competitive field of computer networking.

== Athletics ==
The Hall High School mascot and athletic emblem is the Warrior with orange and white serving as the school colors. The Hall Warriors compete in the 6A Classification—the state's second largest classification—within the 7A/6A Central Conference as administered by the Arkansas Activities Association. The Warriors compete in interscholastic sport activities including football, volleyball, golf (boys/girls), cross country (boys/girls), basketball (boys/girls), soccer (boys/girls), swimming and diving (boys/girls), baseball, softball, wrestling, and track and field (boys/girls).

The Little Rock Hall Warriors have won 51 state championships, including 15 in swimming and diving, 12 in basketball, seven in football, seven in tennis titles, five in track and field, three in golf, and two in cross country.

- Football: The Warriors football teams won seven state football championships (1959, 1964, 1966, 1969, 1977, 1979, 1982).
- Cross Country: The boys cross country teams won two consecutive state cross country championships in 1973 and 1974.
- Golf: The boys golf teams have won three state golf championships (1963, 1964, 1969).
- Swimming and diving: The boys swim teams have won five state swimming titles (1961, 1966, 1969, 1970, 1971). The girls teams won ten state championships (1960, 1961, 1963, 1964, 1965, 1966, 1969, 1971, 1973, 1974).
- Basketball: The Warrior basketball teams have won twelve state basketball championships (boys: 1981, 1982, 1983, 1984, 2001, 2008, 2010, 2011, 2012, 2013, 2026; girls: 1997, 2013).
- Tennis: The tennis teams have won seven state tennis championships (boys: 1968, 1969, 1988; girls: 1971, 1972, 1973, 1983).
- Track and field: The Warriors track teams have won five state track titles (boys: 1966, 1973, 1977, 1978; girls: 1975).

== Notable alumni ==
The following are notable people associated with Hall High School. If the person was a Hall High School student, the number in parentheses indicates the year of graduation; if the person was a faculty or staff member, that person's title and years of association are included

- General Wesley Clark (1963)–former NATO Supreme Allied Commander and 2008 Democratic presidential candidate.
- Maurice Clemmons—convicted of November 29, 2009, murder of four police officers in Lakewood, Washington
- Elbert Crawford—football player
- Sidney Moncrief (1975)–NBA player with Milwaukee Bucks.
- Leslie O'Neal (1982)—football player
- Robert F. "Bob" Palmer Jr. (1963)—musician, author and well-known authority on R&B music and critic for New York Times
- Bobby Portis (2013)–NBA player with Milwaukee Bucks.
- Brent Renaud (1990)—documentary filmmaker
- Jim Guy Tucker (1961)—politician, Congressman (1977–1979) and Governor of Arkansas (1992—1996)
- Daniel Davis (actor) - actor known for playing Niles in The Nanny.
