= Robert Cleveland =

- Born: January 8, 1744; Orange County, Colony of Virginia
- Died: April 10, 1812 (aged 68); Wilkesboro, Wilkes County, North Carolina
- Burial place: Cleveland Cemetery, Purlear, Wilkes County, North Carolina
- Spouse: Alice Aley Mathis (1750-1791)
- Children: 13
- Relatives: Colonel Benjamin Cleveland
- Military career
- Allegiance: United States of America
- Branch: North Carolina militia
- Service years: 1776-1781
- Rank: Captain
- Units: Surry County Regiment (1776-1777), Wilkes County Regiment (1777-1781)
- Conflicts: Battle of Kings Mountain, Battle of Cowpens, Battle of Big Glade

Robert Cleveland (1744–1812) was a soldier in the American Revolutionary War from Wilkes County, North Carolina, and served as a captain in the Wilkes County Regiment of the North Carolina militia under his brother Colonel Benjamin Cleveland.

== Early life ==
Cleveland was the son of John Cleveland and Elisabeth Coffey Cleveland. He was born on his father's plantation in Orange County, Virginia on June 8, 1744; along with several siblings he migrated to western North Carolina sometime around 1769. Those family members who migrated with him were: Benjamin Cleveland, Jeremiah Cleveland, Absalom Cleveland, Larkin Cleveland, Rev. John Cleveland, and a sister Mary who married Bernard Franklin. Franklin's son Jesse Franklin served as governor of North Carolina.

Cleveland was an acquaintance of Daniel Boone and married a Kentucky girl named Aley Mathis (1750–1791). They had thirteen children. He made his home near the Parsonsville, North Carolina community near Lewis Fork, North Carolina. This area is now known as Purlear, North Carolina as recognized by the US Postal Service. The home he once lived in (Robert Cleveland Log House) is said to be the oldest existing home in Wilkes County and has been moved and restored to a place behind the Old Wilkes Jail Museum in Wilkesboro, North Carolina.

== Service ==
Captain Cleveland was an active patriot and served in the Surry County Regiment (1776-1777) and the Wilkes County Regiment (1777-1781) under his brother, Colonel Benjamin Cleveland. He was in the Battle of Kings Mountain, Battle of Cowpens, and Battle of Big Glades.

In the Cleveland Genealogy there is a quote by another soldier named Dan White saying

"... that this brave Captain was due the success of this battle; for in the middle of the conflict, when all were giving away before Ferguson's bayonets Captain Cleveland stood firm and unmoved, sustaining the charge until Colonel Ben Cleveland could rally the troops and come to his assistance."

Cleveland also served on the third electoral college of the United States after the war.

== Death ==
Cleveland was buried in the Cleveland Cemetery alongside his wife in a well-marked grave bearing a headstone and markers placed there by the Daughters of the American Revolution. The grave is surrounded by an iron picket fence and is situated near the site of his old home off the Parsonsville Road.

This site is not far from Rendezvous Mountain, famous as the place that Colonel Benjamin Cleveland rallied the Over Mountain Men in preparation for the trek to Kings Mountain in October 1780. The Battle of King's Mountain was the beginning of the successful end to the Revolution, assuring independence for the United States of America.
