= Senator Isaacs =

Senator Isaacs may refer to:

- Benjamin Isaacs (1778–1846), Connecticut State Senate
- Elijah Isaacs (died 1799), North Carolina State Senate
