= Martin Armstrong (surveyor) =

- Born: 1739; Augusta County, Virginia
- Died: 1802 (aged 62–63); Davidson County, Tennessee
- Burial place: Unknown
- Spouse: Mary Tate
- Relatives: John Armstrong, brother
- Military career
- Allegiance: United States of America
- Branch: North Carolina militia
- Service years: 1775-1783
- Rank: Colonel
- Unit: Surry County Regiment
- Commands: Surry County Regiment
- Conflicts: Battle of Moore's Creek Bridge, Cherokee Expedition, Battle of Camden

Martin Armstrong (1739–1802) was an colonel in the Surry County Regiment of the North Carolina militia during the American Revolution, a surveyor, and notable for devising the plan for Clarksville, Tennessee in 1784.

== Early life ==
Martin Armstrong was born in Augusta County, Virginia in 1739. He was one of the early settlers in what would become Surry County, North Carolina in 1771 after he and Anthony Hampton and James Dunne proposed to the North Carolina General Assembly in December 1770 an act to establish the county. Martin Armstrong was elected to the Third Provincial Congress of August 1775.

== Military career ==
Martin was a captain in the Province of North Carolina militia as early as 1773. During the American Revolution, he was a colonel in the Surry County Regiment of the North Carolina militia. He was appointed as the North Carolina Surveyor General after the war and was responsible for overseeing veterans land claims in what became Tennessee. He ended his career as a brigadier general of the 8th North Carolina Brigade of Militia.

== Post war ==
Following the war, he moved to the western region of North Carolina that later became Tennessee. He met John Montgomery and was interested in joining Montgomery in his plan to establish a town along the Cumberland River. The proposed site by the confluence of the Red River was still unsettled and Armstrong, who was an experienced surveyor agreed to help Montgomery explore and map out the proposed new town. North Carolina had declared the region of the Cumberland River as a military reserve in 1782. Martin Armstrong was appointed entry taker and chief surveyor for the military reservation. His office was to be in Nashville, Tennessee. His responsibility was to help eligible soldiers lay claim to their land-grant parcels.

Martin's brother John Armstrong was also involved in distribution of the western reserve lands. An office authorized by the state of North Carolina was opened in Hillsboro. Its purpose was to handle the entries for military land grants. John Armstrong was the entry taker. In these affairs, Martin Armstrong operated the only other office for the western reserve, serving as the military entry taker and chief surveyor.

It was Armstrong who set up the original survey map of the town, soon to be named Clarksville. Lots were laid out along the Cumberland and streets were designated. Both Montgomery and Armstrong sold lots to interested settlers.

== Scandals ==
Between 1783 and 1790 both John and Martin Armstrong were accused of becoming involved in activities of fraudulent land grant documentation. The initial report of wrongdoing was reported to a North Carolina senator by Andrew Jackson. Southwest Territory governor William Blount was also accused of wrongdoing in the scandal. Ultimately, a judgment for £50,000 was levied against the bondsmen for General Armstrong by the state of North Carolina. The state of Tennessee moved to block any further land grants to Martin Armstrong.
