= Elijah Isaacs =

American statesman

- Born: circa 1730 near Berryville, Virginia
- Died: 1799; Anderson County, South Carolina
- Military career
- Allegiance: United States of America
- Branch: North Carolina militia
- Service years: 1776-1783
- Rank: Lieutenant Colonel
- Units: Surry County Regiment, Wilkes County Regiment
- Conflicts: Battle of Camden, Battle of Colson's Mill

Signature
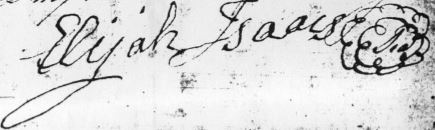

Elijah Isaacs (1730–1799) was a farmer, politician, and militia officer in Wilkes County Regiment of the North Carolina militia during the American Revolution.

== Early life ==
Elijah Isaacs was likely born near Berryville, Virginia, where in 1771 he sold the farm inherited from his father Samuel Isaacs Jr. By September 1775, he was in Surry County, North Carolina, and a member of the Surry County Committee of Safety with Benjamin Cleveland and Joseph Winston.

He had a younger brother named Godfrey Isaacs. His wife's name may have been Mary, and their children were Jinny Isaacs, George Isaacs, Samuel Isaacs, Winny Isaacs, Abbee Isaacs, Elijah Isaacs, and Rebecca Isaacs.

In 1777, he built Fort Defiance on the Yadkin River in what is now Caldwell County, North Carolina. William Lenoir later built a home on the site of Fort Defiance.

== Military service ==
Military service:

- Captain in the Surry County Regiment of the North Carolina militia, 1776-1777
- Captain in the Wilkes County Regiment of militia, 1777-1778
- Major in the Wilkes County Regiment of militia, 1778-1779
- Lt. Col./Colonel in the Wilkes County Regiment of militia, 1779-1783

Lieutenant Colonel Elijah Isaacs was Colonel Benjamin Cleveland’s second in command of the Wilkes County Regiment of militia during the American Revolution. In August 1780, Isaacs led the Wilkes County regiment under Brigadier General Griffith Rutherford, commander of the Salisbury District Brigade of militia in western North Carolina. Two days before the Battle of Camden (South Carolina) Isaacs’ regiment was detached from Major General Horatio Gates' army to reinforce Colonel Thomas Sumter. Elijah Isaacs was captured when Lieutenant–Colonel Banastre Tarleton defeated Sumter’s forces at the Battle of Fishing Creek on August 18, 1780.

Lieutenant Colonel Isaacs and General Rutherford, who was captured at the Battle of Camden, were held at St. Augustine, Florida until exchanged in July 1781. From October 1781 through February 1782, Isaacs led a militia regiment fighting against Colonel David Fanning's Tories in Chatham County, North Carolina and Randolph County, North Carolina.

== Political career ==
He was a representative to the North Carolina General Assembly from Wilkes County in 1778, 1779, and 1780. He served as senator in the assembly in 1782 and 1783. In May 1778, he introduced a bill in the House of Commons to form Wilkes County, which was formed in 1779 from parts of Surry County and Washington District, North Carolina.

== Death ==
After the American Revolution ended, Elijah Isaacs bought land in Georgia and may have lived there briefly. By 1790 he was living in Anderson County, South Carolina, where he is believed to have died in 1799.
