= Wilkes County Regiment =

American colonial military unit

- Active: 1777-1783
- Allegiance: North Carolina
- Branch: North Carolina militia
- Type: Militia
- Part of: Salisbury District Brigade

Commanders
- Notable commanders: Col. Benjamin Cleveland; Col. Elijah Isaacs; Col. Benjamin Herndon

The Wilkes County Regiment was authorized on December 9, 1777 by the Province of North Carolina Congress at the same time that Wilkes County, North Carolina was created from Surry County, North Carolina and Washington District, North Carolina. The regiment was subordinate to the Salisbury District Brigade of militia. It was engaged in battles and skirmishes against the British and Cherokee during the American Revolution in North Carolina, South Carolina, Tennessee, and Georgia between 1779 and 1782. It was active until the end of the war.

== Officers ==
The colonels and commanders of the regiment were:

- Col. Benjamin Cleveland (commander, 1777-1782)
- Col. Elijah Isaacs (2nd colonel, 1779-1783)
- Col. Benjamin Herndon (2nd colonel, 1781-1783)

Known Lieutenant Colonels and Majors:

- Lt. Col. Hardgrove
- Lt. Col. John Herndon
- Lt. Col. William Nash
- Lt. Col. William Shepherd
- 1st Maj. John Brevard
- 2nd Maj. William Lewis
- Maj. Josiah Branham
- Maj. Jesse Hardin Franklin (later Governor of North Carolina, 1820-1821)
- Maj. Nathaniel Gordon
- Maj. Joseph Hardin Sr.
- Maj. Francis Hardgrave
- Maj. Benjamin Herndon
- Maj. Joseph Herndon
- Maj. Elijah Isaacs
- Maj. William Lenoir
- Maj. Joseph Lewis
- Maj. James Smith
- Maj. James Stevenson

The regiment had 78 known companies headed by captains. Companies consisted of lieutenants, ensigns, sergeants, corporals, privates, drummers and fifers. Notables captains and other troops included:

- Capt Richard Allen (1778-1781, may have been Colonel of the regiment after the war
- Private John Hammon under Captain Larkin Cleveland (the 2nd to last Revolutionary War Patriot to die, 1760-1868)

- Captain and Major William Lenoir later went on to become a major general in the North Carolina militia after the war.

== See also ==
- List of American Revolutionary War battles
- Salisbury District Brigade
- Southern Campaigns: Pension Transactions for a description of the transcription effort by Will Graves
- Southern theater of the American Revolutionary War

== Bibliography ==
- Arthur, John Preston (1914). Western North Carolina; a history (1730-1913). National Society Daughters of the American Revolution of North Carolina. Edward Buncombe Chapter, Asheville, North Carolina.
- Hunter, C.L. (1877). Sketches of western North Carolina, historical and biographical : illustrating principally the Revolutionary period of Mecklenburg, Rowan, Lincoln, and adjoining counties, accompanied with miscellaneous information, much of it never before published. Raleigh: Raleigh News Steam Job Print. p. 166-183.
