= Carteret County Regiment =

American colonial military unit

- Active: 1775-1783
- Allegiance: (United States) North Carolina
- Branch: North Carolina militia infantry
- Type: Militia
- Engagements: Battle of Stono Ferry, Battle of Beaufort

Commanders
- Notable commanders: Colonel William Thompson

The Carteret County Regiment was authorized by the North Carolina Provincial Congress on September 9, 1775. It was subordinate to the New Bern District Brigade after May 4, 1776. The regiment was engaged in battles or skirmishes against the British during the American Revolution, including the Battle of Stono Ferry and the Battle of Beaufort. The regiment also existed during the colonial period in the Province of North Carolina.

== Leadership ==
The Carteret County Regiment was commanded by the following colonels:

- William Thompson (1775-1779)
- Thomas Chadwick (1778-1779)
- 2nd Colonel Malachi Bell (1779-1783)
- 2nd Colonel Enoch Ward (1780-1783)

Known Lieutenant Colonels:

- Lt. Col. Solomon Shepherd
- Lt. Col. John Easton
- Lt. Col. James Cole Mountflorence

Known Majors:

- 1st Maj. Thomas Chadwick
- 2nd Maj. Malachi Bell
- Maj. Isaiah Chadwick
- Maj. William Dennis
- Maj. Eli West
- Maj. Bryce Williams

== See also ==
- Carteret County, North Carolina
- Southern Campaigns: Pension Transactions for a description of the transcription effort by Will Graves
- Southern theater of the American Revolutionary War
- List of North Carolina militia units in the American Revolution
