= William Thompson (North Carolina politician) =

American politician

- Born: February 3, 1732; County Down, Ireland
- Died: November 22, 1802 (aged 70); Beaufort, North Carolina, U.S.
- Burial place: Old Burying Ground
- Military career
- Allegiance: United States of America
- Branch: North Carolina militia
- Service years: 1775-1779
- Rank: Colonel
- Commands: Carteret County Regiment
- Awards: Battle of Stono Ferry

William Thompson (February 3, 1732 – November 22, 1802) was the Senator for Carteret County in the North Carolina General Assembly of 1778 and 1779. He was also a colonel and commander of the Carteret County Regiment of the North Carolina militia during the American Revolution.

== Life story ==
William Thompson (also known as William Thomson) was born on February 3, 1732, in County Down, Ireland. He settled in Beaufort, Carteret County, Province of North Carolina in about 1770. He was a naval deputy for the port of Beaufort.

William was a member of the Carteret County militia in the colonial era and helped North Carolina Governor William Tryon in the War of the Regulation.

William was a representative from Carteret County to the Colonial General Assembly in 1769, 1770–1771, 1773, 1774, and 1775.

William Thompson and his colleague Soloman Shepard (1728–1780) were delegates from Carteret County to the first North Carolina Provincial Congress held in New Bern on August 25, 1774. The same two were delegates to the second Provincial Congress held in New Bern in April of 1775. The British had cut off salt supplies to Carteret County in 1775. William Thompson was on a committee that was exploring production of salt in the county. Prior to this time, the county had been dependent on receiving salt from elsewhere. Of the five delegates to the third Provincial Congress that occurred on August 25, 1775, they were two of the five delegates from Carteret County.

== Revolutionary War ==
When the Provincial Congress appointed officers for the Carteret County Regiment on September 9, 1775, William Thompson was selected as a colonel and Soloman Shepard as Lieutenant Colonel of the regiment. The regiment was active until the end of the war. The regiment also had several second colonels during its history, Thomas Chadwick, Malachi Bell, and Enoch Ward. His colleague from the Provincial Congress, Soloman Shepard, died in 1780.

== Senator ==
William represented Carteret County in the North Carolina State Senate in 1778 and 1779.

== Death ==
William Thompson died on November 22, 1802, in Beaufort, North Carolina. He was buried at the Old Burying Ground in Beaufort. He left his estate to the poor and orphans.
