= Robert Lindsay (North Carolina politician) =

American politician

Robert Lindsay (c. 1735 – 1801) was an American politician who was elected to the North Carolina General Assembly of 1777.

== Life story ==
Robert Lindsay was the son of John Lindsay, but there are conflicting accounts as to their background and Robert's early life. One account says he was born c. 1735. He may have been born in Virginia or Ireland. He was descended from the ancient and illustrious Clan Lindsay of Scotland. Evidently, he lived for a time on the Pennsylvania/Maryland border area before coming to North Carolina in the mid-18th century. His name first appears in the North Carolina records in 1763. He died in 1801.

Lindsay established a 2,000 acre (8 km^{2}) plantation on Deep River in what later became Guilford County. In fact, when the county was formed in 1771, and until a court house could be built in 1774, the county court met in the "great hall" of his plantation home. The property included an ordinary (an inn/tavern), formal gardens, a mulberry grove for raising silk worms, a silk mill, a grist mill, and a store. A fragment of the original house remains.

Robert Lindsay was a captain in the North Carolina Militia. He served in the first independent North Carolina Legislature from 1777 to 1778, and was presiding Judge of Guilford County from 1781 to 1788. He was a well known and respected member of his community, and his descendants were prominent in the history of North Carolina.

Robert married twice:

1. His first wife was Elizabeth Mebane with whom he had two children:
  1. Elizabeth, who died young
  2. John A. Lindsay (1767–1828) who married Elizabeth Wilson and raised a large family in Davidson County, NC.
2. Lindsay's second wife was Ann "Nancy" McGee (1753/4-1832), a daughter of Colonel John McGee (d.1773), whom he married on 23 June 1772. They had eight children:
  1. Senator Samuel Lindsay (c.1774-1813, m. Henrietta Causey)
  2. Colonel Robert Lindsay, Jr. (1776–1818, m. Letitia Harper, father of Ann Eliza Lindsay Morehead)
  3. William Lindsay (1777–1841, m. Elisabeth Briggs)
  4. Jane Lindsay (1779–1827, m. Jesse Hargrave)
  5. Elizabeth Lindsay (1784–1825, m. Rev. Samuel Craighead Caldwell)
  6. Andrew Lindsay (1786–1844, m. Elizabeth Dick)
  7. Susannah Lindsay (1789–1857, m. Dr. Joseph Wood)
  8. David Lindsay (1793–1860, m. Sarah Dillon).
