= John Blackstock =

Australian cricketer

Personal information
- Born: 16 January 1871; Edinburgh, Scotland
- Died: 14 September 1950 (aged 79); Sydney, Australia
- Source: Cricinfo, 1 October 2020

John Blackstock (16 January 1871 – 14 September 1950) was an Australian cricketer. He played in one first-class match for Queensland in 1896/97.

Blackstock was born in Scotland where his family owned farmland. When he was young they immigrated to North Queensland aiming to capitalize on the gold mining boom ultimately settling in Toowoomba where he attended Toowoomba Grammar School. After graduating he began working for the Union Bank where he worked until he was sixty and he became well-known in Mackay and Brisbane.

He played for the Woolloongabba Cricket Club in district cricket under Roger Hartigan and represented the Queensland state team once and he was involved in cricket administration after his playing days up until his retirement at age sixty. He died in 1950 and was survived by a son and daughter.

== See also ==
- List of Queensland first-class cricketers
