= Joshua Swann =

American politician

Joshua Swann was a member of the North Carolina General Assembly of 1779 from Tyrrell County. There have been several spelling of Joshua's last name, including "Swain".
