= Whitmell Hill =

American politician

Personal details
- Born: February 12, 1743 Bertie County, North Carolina
- Died: September 25, 1797 (aged 54) Martin County, North Carolina
- Military career
- Allegiance: United States of America
- Branch: North Carolina millita
- Rank: Colonel
- Unit: Martin County Regiment North Carolina militia

Whitmell Hill (February 12, 1743 – September 26, 1797) was an American planter from Martin County, North Carolina and commander of the Martin County Regiment of the North Carolina militia during the American Revolution. He was a delegate for North Carolina to the Continental Congress from 1778 to 1780 and served as Speaker of the North Carolina House of Commons in 1778.

== Early life ==
Whitmell was the son of a John and Martha Hill, and was born in Bertie County, North Carolina. In 1760 he graduated from the University of Pennsylvania and returned to North Carolina to begin developing his own plantation, Hill’s Ferry, in what was to become Martin County when it was established in 1774.

== Service in the American Revolution ==
Service record:

- Lt. Colonel in the Martin County Regiment of the North Carolina militia (1775-1778)
- Colonel over the Martin County Regiment of the North Carolina militia (1778 & 1781-1783)
- North Carolina delegate to the Continental Congress (1778-1780)

Hill supported the rising revolutionary sentiment, and when the Martin County Regiment of the North Carolina militia was organized he was named its Lieutenant Colonel, and was later its Colonel in 1778. When the revolutionary North Carolina Provincial Congress met in 1775-1776 he represented Martin County. Then, in 1776 he was advanced to the Provincial Council to represent the Edenton district. During this time he was also a member of the local Committee of Safety.

== Political career ==
Once North Carolina wrote its new Constitution, Hill was elected to the state Senate, and served as speaker in 1778. Later that year the Assembly named him as one of the state's delegates to the Continental Congress. He was returned to the Congress until 1781, when the term limit imposed by the state constitution prevented his reappointment. He was re-elected to the state Senate in 1783, 1784, and 1788. In 1788 he was also a delegate to North Carolina's Hillsborough Convention to consider ratification of the U.S. Constitution. His outspoken support helped strengthen the forces that ultimately completed ratification the following year in Fayetteville.

== Death ==
Hill died and was buried at his home, Hill’s Ferry, in northwestern Martin County. In 1887 his grave was moved to the Trinity Cemetery, near Scotland Neck in Halifax County, North Carolina.
