= Benjamin Spruill =

American politician

Benjamin Spruill was a member of the Province of North Carolina House of Burgesses and North Carolina General Assembly of 1779, representing Tyrrell County.
