= Richard Cogdell =

British scientist

professor Richard Cogdell FRS FRSE

Hooker Professor of Botany, University of Glasgow
- Incumbent
- Assumed office 1993

Personal details
- Born: Richard John Cogdell; 4 February 1949 (age 77)

Richard John Cogdell (born 4 February 1949) is a British plant molecular biologist who holds the Hooker Chair of Botany at the University of Glasgow. Cogdell is the director of Glasgow Biomedical Research Centre, with a principal research interest in the structure and function of purple bacterial photosynthetic membrane proteins. Cogdell has authored over 250 peer-reviewed journal articles, and was a member of the Council of the BBSRC from 2014 to 2018.

== Education ==
Cogdell was educated at Royal Grammar School, Guildford and the University of Bristol where he studied biochemistry obtaining a BSc in 1970 and a PhD in 1973.

== Career ==
From 1973 to 1975 Cogdell carried out postdoctoral research at Cornell University and University of Washington and was a lecturer in botany at the University of Glasgow from 1975 to 1978. He was a visiting professor at UCLA in 1979 and the University of Paris-Sud in 2004. From 2007 to 2007 he was adjunct professor at the Chinese Academy of Sciences' Institute of Biophysics in Beijing.

Cogdell's primary research interest is in the early events of bacterial photosynthesis, specifically on the involvement of pigment-protein complexes in light harvesting and energy transfer using protein crystallography and various methods of spectroscopy. His collaboration with other related groups culminated in a 1995 scientific paper describing the three dimensional structure of a light-harvesting complex from the bacterium, Rhodopseudomas acidophila. Subsequent collaborations with physics and chemistry research teams have led to a more complete understanding of the various energy transfer reactions involved in light harvesting.

He is now exploring the potential applications of these discoveries to the production of fuels using sunlight and founded the Glasgow Solar Fuels Initiative with Leroy Cronin in Glasgow to coordinate the work of other research groups within Glasgow University and others in the US, Japan, Germany, Italy and Poland.

Cogdell has been Editor-in-Chief of the Royal Society journal Journal of the Royal Society Interface since 2019.

== Awards and honours ==
Cogdell was elected a Fellow of the Royal Society in 2007 His citation reads as follows:

Richard Cogdell's research has investigated the structure and function of bacterial reaction centres and light-harvesting complexes. In both areas he has made seminal contributions. He was the first to show that in reaction centres ubiquinone was the primary electron acceptor, that bacteriopheophytin was the intermediate electron acceptor and how carotenoid triplet formation photoprotects. More recently his determination of the crystal structure of the LH2 antenna complex has completely changed ideas of the mechanisms photosynthetic energy transfer, and induced many physicists and chemists to study this complex. This new structure of the RC-LH1 'core' complex is likely to be just as influential.

He was elected a Fellow of the Royal Society of Edinburgh in 1991 and he is also a Fellow of the Royal Society of Biology.

- Humboldt Prize 1995
- Daiwa-Adrian Prize 2001
