= John Williams (Pitt County, North Carolina) =

American politician

John Williams (c. 1735 – 1789) was a planter and an American Revolutionary from Pitt County, North Carolina. He was the son of a Welsh immigrant, and served on the county Committee of Correspondence. He represented his county in the North Carolina provisional Assembly of 1777 as well as the state's House of Commons in 1778 and 1779.
