= Benjamin Cleveland =

Colonel in Revolutionary militia (1738 – 1806)

- Born: May 28, 1738; Orange County, Colony of Virginia
- Died: October 15, 1806 (aged 68); Oconee County, South Carolina
- Burial place: Benjamin Cleveland Cemetery, Madison, Oconee County, South Carolina
- Spouse: Mary Graves
- Military career
- Allegiance: United States of America
- Branch: North Carolina militia
- Service years: 1775–1782
- Rank: Colonel
- Units: Surry County Regiment, Wilkes County Regiment, 2nd Battalion of Volunteers
- Commands: Wilkes County Regiment, North Carolina militia
- Conflicts: Battle of King's Mountain

Benjamin Cleveland (May 28, 1738 – October 15, 1806) was an American pioneer and officer in the North Carolina militia. He is best remembered for his service as a colonel in the Wilkes County Regiment of the North Carolina militia during the American Revolutionary War, and in particular for his role in the American victory at the Battle of Kings Mountain.

== Personal life and career ==
Benjamin Cleveland was born in Orange County, Virginia, the fourth child of John and Elizabeth [nee Coffee] Cleveland, and was of English descent and Irish descent. He moved to the area which would become Wilkes County, North Carolina in 1769. There, Cleveland built his estate, "Roundabout," near what is today Ronda, North Carolina. He was noted in the early history of Wilkes County, and is known to have worked as a hunter, trapper, farmer, carpenter, and surveyor. By the time of the American Revolution, Cleveland was the wealthiest and most prominent citizen in the county. A large, heavyset man – around six feet tall and weighing over 300 lbs in his prime – he was called "Old Roundabout".

Cleveland married Mary Graves, a sister of Susannah Graves, the wife of Revolutionary War patriot and frontiersman, General Joseph Martin (for whom Martinsville, Virginia, is named).

Cleveland was elected to the North Carolina House of Commons in 1778 and to the North Carolina Senate in 1779 and 1780.

== Revolutionary War ==
Military service record:

- Lieutenant in the Surry County Regiment of militia (1775–1776)
- Captain in the Surry County Regiment of militia (1776–1777)
- Captain in the 2nd Battalion of Volunteers (1776–1777)
- Colonel over the Wilkes County Regiment of militia (1777–1782)

Cleveland was commissioned a lieutenant in 1775 and as a colonel in 1777 in the North Carolina militia. Until Lord Cornwallis invaded in 1780, the fighting in North Carolina consisted of guerrilla warfare between patriots ("Whigs") and "Tories". Cleveland became known as the "Terror of the Tories" for his treatment of Loyalists. In 1779, two Tories looted the home of George Wilfong, a patriot and friend of Cleveland, in an attempt to retrieve items stolen from them. The Tories used Wilfong's clothes line to chase away his horses. They were captured by Cleveland's men, who had them hanged using the clothes line they had stolen. In revenge, a group of Tories led by Captain William Riddle kidnapped Cleveland. Cleveland convinced them to release him, which they did. Cleveland immediately went after Riddle. Cleveland and his men captured Riddle and two others. All three were hanged from the same tree, which became known as the "Tory Oak," and was for years an historic landmark behind the old Wilkes County Courthouse (now the Wilkes Heritage Museum).

=== Kings Mountain ===
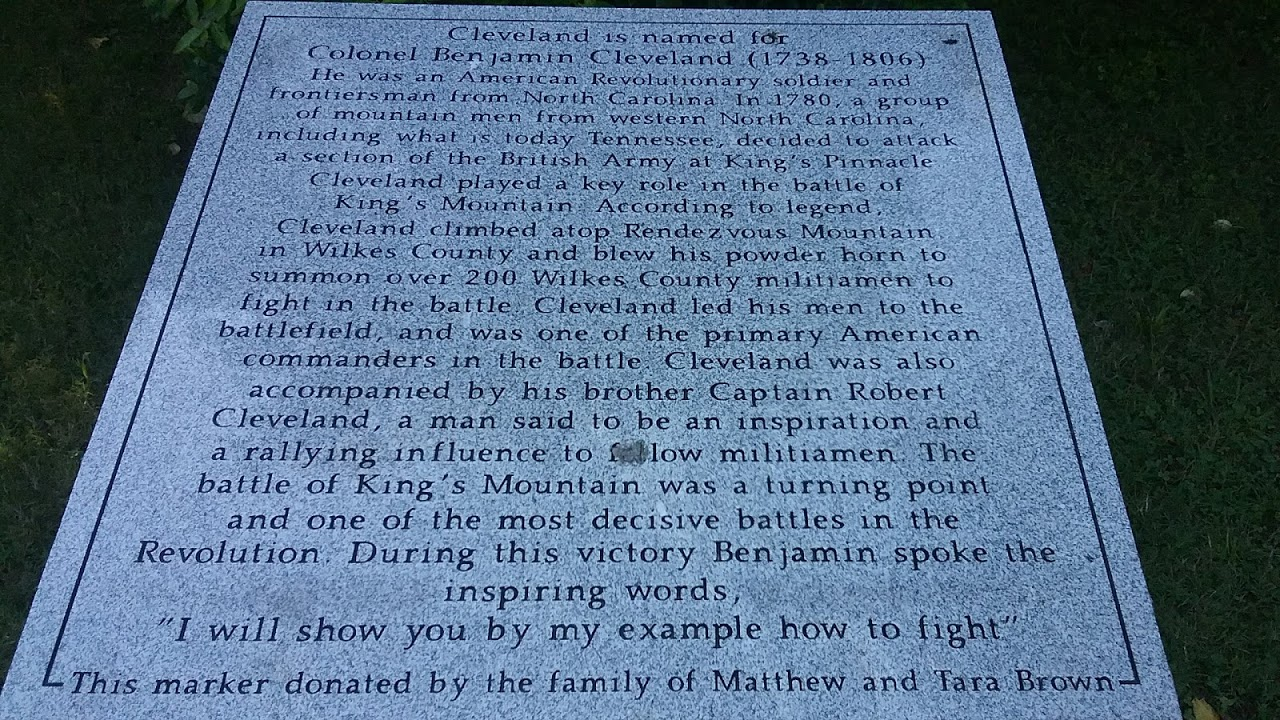
Historical marker about Cleveland on the Cleveland/Bradley County Greenway in Cleveland, Tennessee.

In 1780, General Lord Cornwallis led a British army into the Carolinas and won several victories over the patriots. Major Patrick Ferguson, one of Cornwallis's commanders, led an army of Tories into the North Carolina mountains to crush the rebels there. A large force of mountain men attacked Ferguson at Kings Pinnacle, an isolated ridge on the North Carolina-South Carolina border.

Prior to the Battle of King's Mountain, Cleveland and his men murdered an unarmed father and son, then dismembered them. This act led Ferguson to post broadsides warning people that this type of treatment is what they will suffer at the hands of the Patriots if they win the war.

Cleveland played a key role in the ensuing Battle of Kings Mountain. According to legend, Cleveland climbed up Rendezvous Mountain and blew his horn to summon some 200 Wilkes County militiamen. He led them into battle. Cleveland's horse was shot from under him, and Major Ferguson was himself killed in the battle. Cleveland's brother, Robert, is said to have rallied the militiamen during the heat of the battle, contributing to the patriot victory. Cleveland claimed Ferguson's white stallion as a "war prize", and rode it home to his estate of Roundabout.

== Later years ==
After the war, Cleveland moved to the South Carolina frontier and was a commissioner in the Pendleton District.

He died at his home in Oconee County, South Carolina in 1806 of heart dropsy. An obelisk monument to him stands on private property just north of U.S. Route 123 about 160 yds (145 m) east of the Madison Baptist Church in the Madison Community of Oconee County. He was buried about 1 mi (1.6 km) away in a private cemetery.

== Legacy ==
Cleveland County, North Carolina and Cleveland, Tennessee are named in his honor.

A historical marker dedicated to Cleveland reads: "Colonel in Revolution, Whig leader in battle of Kings Mountain, state legislator. Home was on 'The Round About,' one mile southwest."

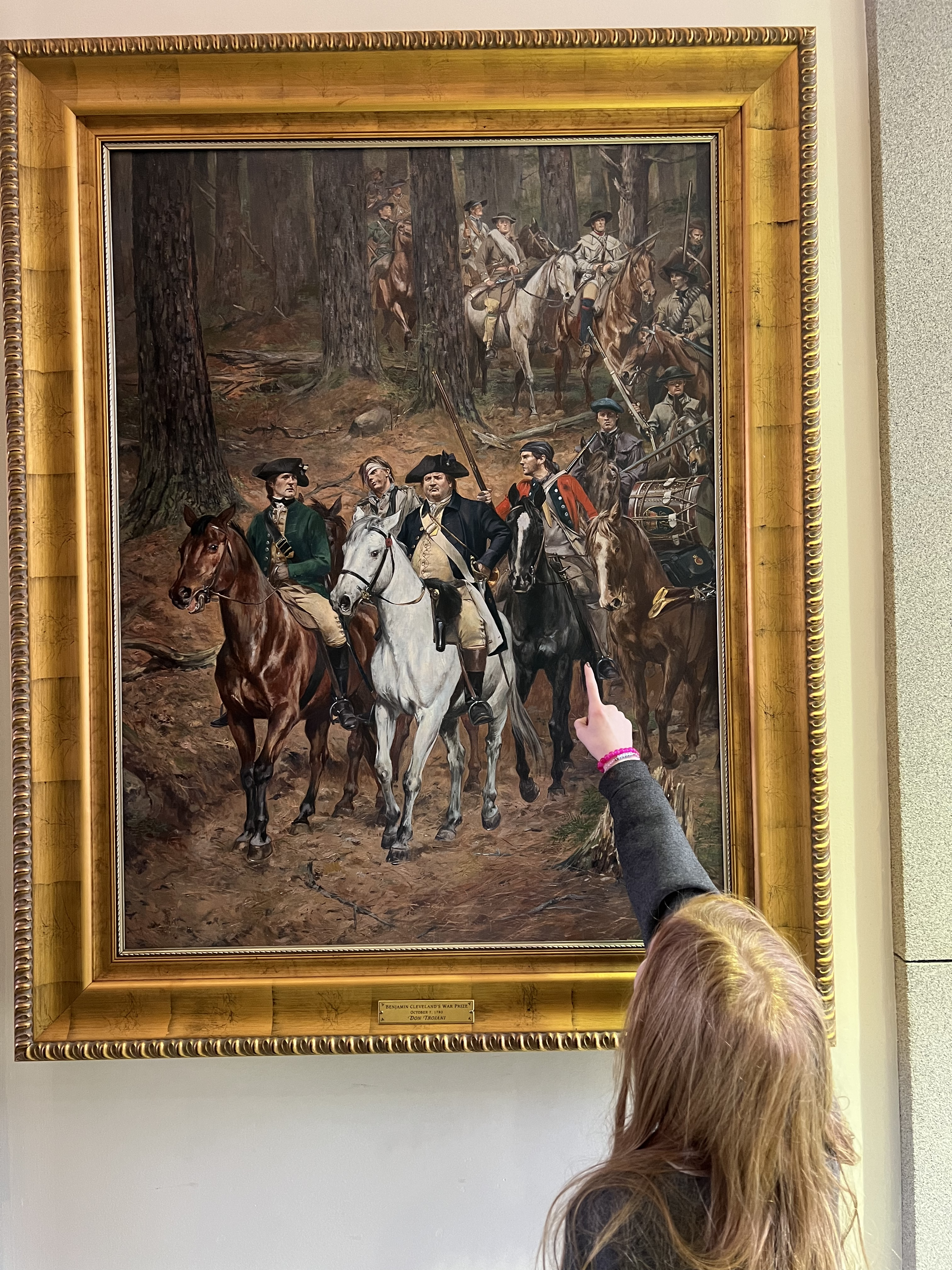
Giclee replica of Troian's original painting "Benjamin Cleveland's War Prize"

=== First historically accurate depiction and statue ===
In 2012, artist Don Troiani completed the first historically accurate depiction of Benjamin Cleveland, titled "Benjamin Cleveland's War Prize." Troiani teamed with experts from across the nation to ensure accuracy. These included historical tailor Henry Cooke, a consultant for the History Channel and owner of Historical Costume Services in Randolph, Massachusetts. Troiani asked Cooke to hand-stitch the hat and clothing that appear in the painting and required that every detail was to be embroidered by hand. The waistcoat in the painting featured hand-embroidered silk that matched a North Carolina waistcoat from 1770. Dr. Philip Mead, a Harvard University historian and expert on Revolutionary War theory, did research through the National Archives and acquired an original Revolutionary War militia officer’s sword for the Cleveland’s depiction in the painting. Tim Wilson, the shoe and boot maker for Colonial Williamsburg, made boots identical to the ones Cleveland wore at the battle and ordered special England leather that was identical to what would have been worn in the late 18th century. Williamsburg’s arms expert, Erik Goldstein, created a scabbard for the sword that was acquired by Mead. The project was funded by local businessman and philanthropist Allan Jones. The painting features a victorious Cleveland leading his troops back home to Wilkes County on Ferguson's white stallion.

The research that contributed to the Don Troiani painting was used to create a 500-pound bronze statue of Colonel Benjamin Cleveland. On April 19, 2013, the statue of Cleveland, sculpted by local Cleveland, Tennessee artist, Joshua Coleman, was erected in Patriots Park in Cleveland. The statue was funded by the Colonel Benjamin Cleveland Chapter of the Tennessee Society of the Sons of the American Revolution.

== Depictions ==
Benjamin Cleveland is depicted in Season 8 of the television series Outlander, which is set-in the run-up to the Battle of Kings Mountain. He is portrayed by actor Turlough Convery.

== See also ==
Robert Cleveland Log House
