= Surry County Regiment =

American colonial military unit

- Active: 1775-1783
- Allegiance: North Carolina
- Branch: North Carolina militia
- Type: Militia
- Part of: Brigade

Commanders
- Notable commanders: Col. Martin Armstrong; Col. Joseph Williams

The Surry County Regiment was established on August 26, 1775 by the North Carolina Provincial Congress. The regiment was engaged in battles and skirmishes against the British and Cherokee during the American Revolution in North Carolina, South Carolina Tennessee, and Georgia between 1776 and 1782. It was active until the end of the war.

== History ==
The Surry County Regiment was one of the 35 existing North Carolina county militias that were authorized to be organized by the North Carolina Provincial Congress on September 9, 1775. The officers were appointed by the North Carolina Provincial Congress. The regiment had only one commander, Colonel Martin Armstrong. The Surry County Regiment became part of the Salisbury District Brigade commanded by Brigadier General Griffith Rutherford when it was established on May 4, 1776. The regiment was active until the end of the Revolutionary War in 1783.

== Officers ==
The known officers of the Surry County Regiment included:

Commanders

- Colonel Martin Armstrong (commandant, 1775-1783)
- Colonel Joseph Williams (2nd colonel, 1776-1783) (Lieutenant Colonel, 1775–1776)

Lieutenant Colonels:

- Lt. Col. Joseph Williams
- Lt. Col. Robert Lanier
- Lt. Col. David Looney
- Lt. Col. John "Jack" Martin
- Lt. Col. Joseph Phillips

Majors:

- 1st Maj. William Hall
- 2nd Maj. Joseph Winston
- Maj. Micajah Lewis
- Maj. Richardson Owens
- Maj. John Shepherd
- Maj. Henry Smith
- Maj. Joseph Vincent
- Maj. Jesse Walton
- Maj. Gibson Wooldridge

Adjutants:

- James Armstrong
- Patrick McGibboney
- William Queery

The regiment had 121 known companies headed by captains with subordinate lieutenants, ensigns, sergeants, corporals, and privates.

== Known engagements ==
See Salisbury District Brigade engagements matrix for known battles and skirmishes involving companies of the Surry County Regiment.

== See also ==
- List of American Revolutionary War battles
- Salisbury District Brigade
- Southern Campaigns: Pension Transactions for a description of the transcription effort by Will Graves
- Southern theater of the American Revolutionary War

== Bibliography ==
- Arthur, John Preston, Western North Carolina; a history (1730-1913), National Society Daughters of the American Revolution of North Carolina. Edward Buncombe Chapter, Asheville, North Carolina, Publication date 1914, Link, accessed Jan 29, 2019
- Hollingsworth, J. G. (1935). History of Surry County, North Carolina.
- Hunter, C.L.; Sketches of western North Carolina, historical and biographical : illustrating principally the Revolutionary period of Mecklenburg, Rowan, Lincoln, and adjoining counties, accompanied with miscellaneous information, much of it never before published, Raleigh : Raleigh News Steam Job Print, 1877; pages 166-183
- North Carolina in the American Revolution (PDF). An Exhibition of the Society of Cincinnati. 2006.
