= Washington District, North Carolina =

Short-lived district in western North Carolina (Tennessee)

Coordinates: 36.20°N 82.15°W

The Washington District of North Carolina was in a remote area west of the Appalachian Mountains, officially existing for only a short period (November 1776 – November 1777), although it had been self-proclaimed and functioning as an independent governing entity since the spring of 1775. The district was the bureaucratic successor to the Watauga Association, a group of Virginian settlers that colonized the area in 1769, originally believing themselves to be in trans-Appalachian Virginia territory. When the settlement's application to be united with Virginia was denied, they asked North Carolina to annex the settlement, which occurred in November, 1776.

After the American Revolution, the now informal district saw a huge growth of the area it encompassed, eventually stretching to the Mississippi River. At the time of North Carolina's final cession of the area to the Federal Government (1790), it had grown to include the seven "Overmountain Counties": Washington, Greene, Davidson, Sullivan, Hawkins, Sumner and Tennessee. These lands would become a large part not only of the subsequent extra-legal State of Franklin, but of the Southwest Territory (1790–1796) and the State of Tennessee (after 1796) as well.

== History ==
=== Watauga Association ===
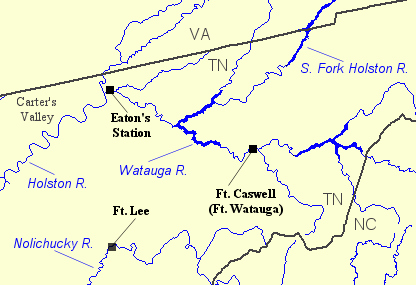
Targets of the failed Cherokee invasion of the Washington District, 1776

In May 1772, several years after arriving in the area, the settlers created their own government charter, a "written association and articles for the management of general affairs", and elected a self-governing body (considered by The Crown to be an extra-legal entity at best, in light of the Royal Proclamation of 1763) and set up a courthouse and jail. This government became known as the "Watauga Association" (or, sometimes, "Watauga Republic").

=== Washington District ===
Shortly after the outbreak of the American Revolutionary War (April 1775), the members of the Watauga Association organized themselves into the extra-legal "Washington District", a separate region "...loyal to the united colonies...". They promptly formed a Committee of Safety to oversee it.

In the Spring of 1776, seeking additional security for its inhabitants, the Washington District Committee of Safety drafted a petition asking the Colony of Virginia to annex the district. After Virginia refused, the Committee drafted a similar petition (dated July 5, 1776) asking the North Carolina Assembly to annex the area. In November of that year, North Carolina granted the petition, and the Washington District was admitted to North Carolina and designated Washington County, although the district technically remained in existence until the formal adoption as a North Carolina county almost a full year later. Thereafter, "Washington District" was used to refer to North Carolina's holdings west of the Appalachian Mountains.

Immediately after the news of the second petition was made known, the Cherokee—from whom the district had originally leased the settlement's land, but who had now allied themselves with the British—launched an all-out invasion against the district, but were soundly defeated. In 1777, the Cherokee signed the Treaty of Long Island, effectively ceding control of the Watauga and Nolichucky valleys to North Carolina. Chief Dragging Canoe (eventual leader of the Chickamauga Cherokee), and his followers, however, vowed to continue to fight.

== The Watauga Petition ==
The petition requesting annexation to North Carolina (often referred to as the "Watauga Petition") was drawn up by the Washington District Committee of Safety and was signed by the district's thirteen elected commissioners. These were:

- William Bean
- Jacob Brown
- John Carter
- Zachary Isbell
- John Jones
- Robert Lucs
- Charles Robertson
- James Robertson
- George Russell
- John Sevier
- James Smith
- William Tatham
- Jacob Womack

== See also ==
- Washington County, Tennessee
