= First ladies and gentlemen of North Carolina =

List of spouses of North Carolina Governors

First Lady of North Carolina

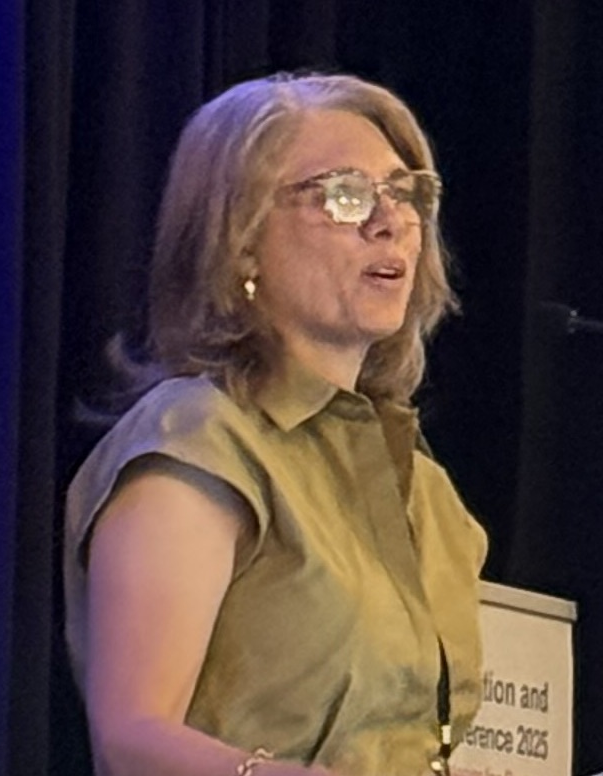
- Incumbent; Anna Harris Stein since January 1, 2025
- Style: First Lady; First Gentleman
- Residence: Executive Mansion (primary); Western Residence (secondary)
- Inaugural holder: Sarah Heritage Caswell
- Formation: 1776
- Website: governor.nc.gov/first-lady-scheduling-request

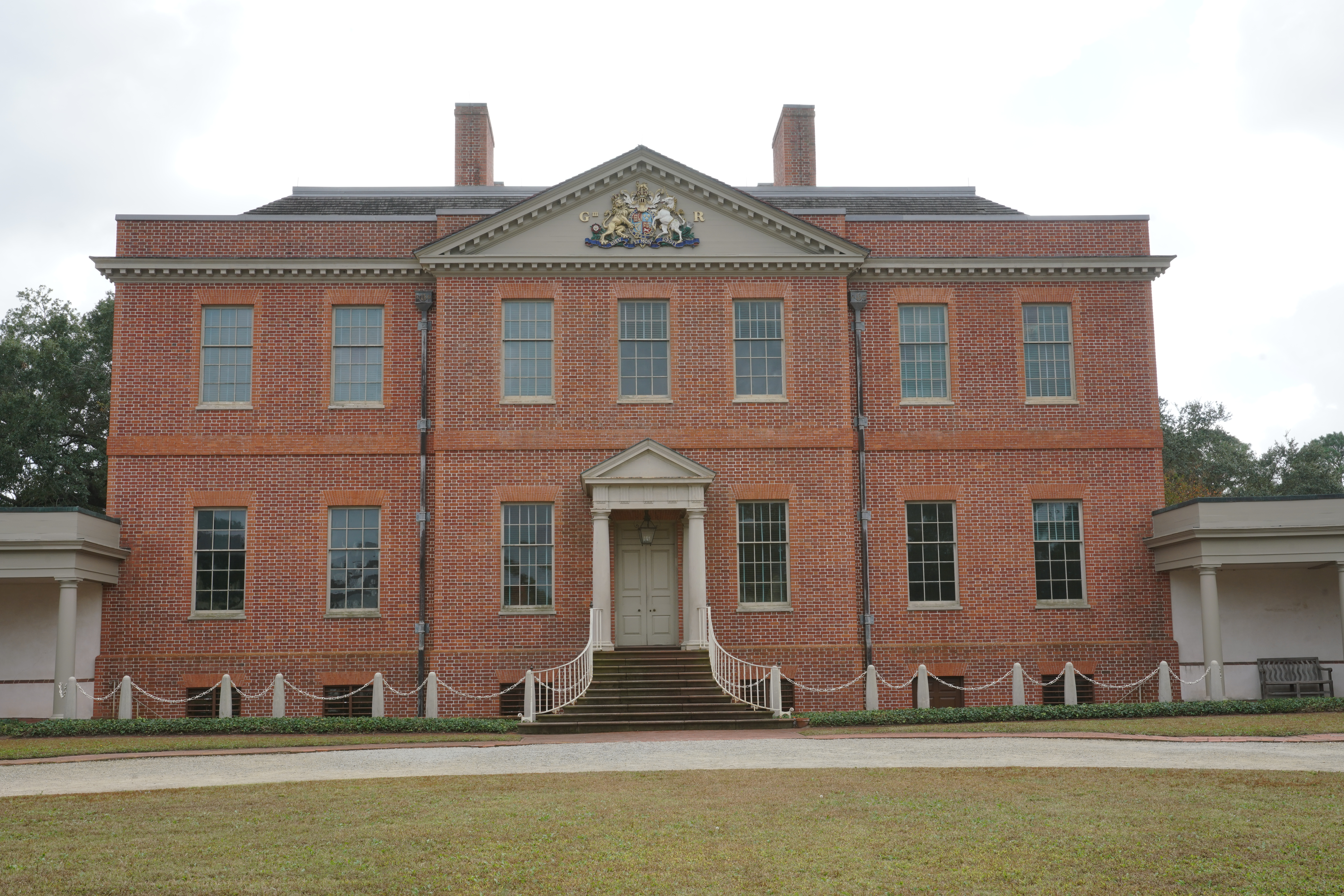
Tryon Palace in New Bern was the official residence of the colonial first ladies in North Carolina

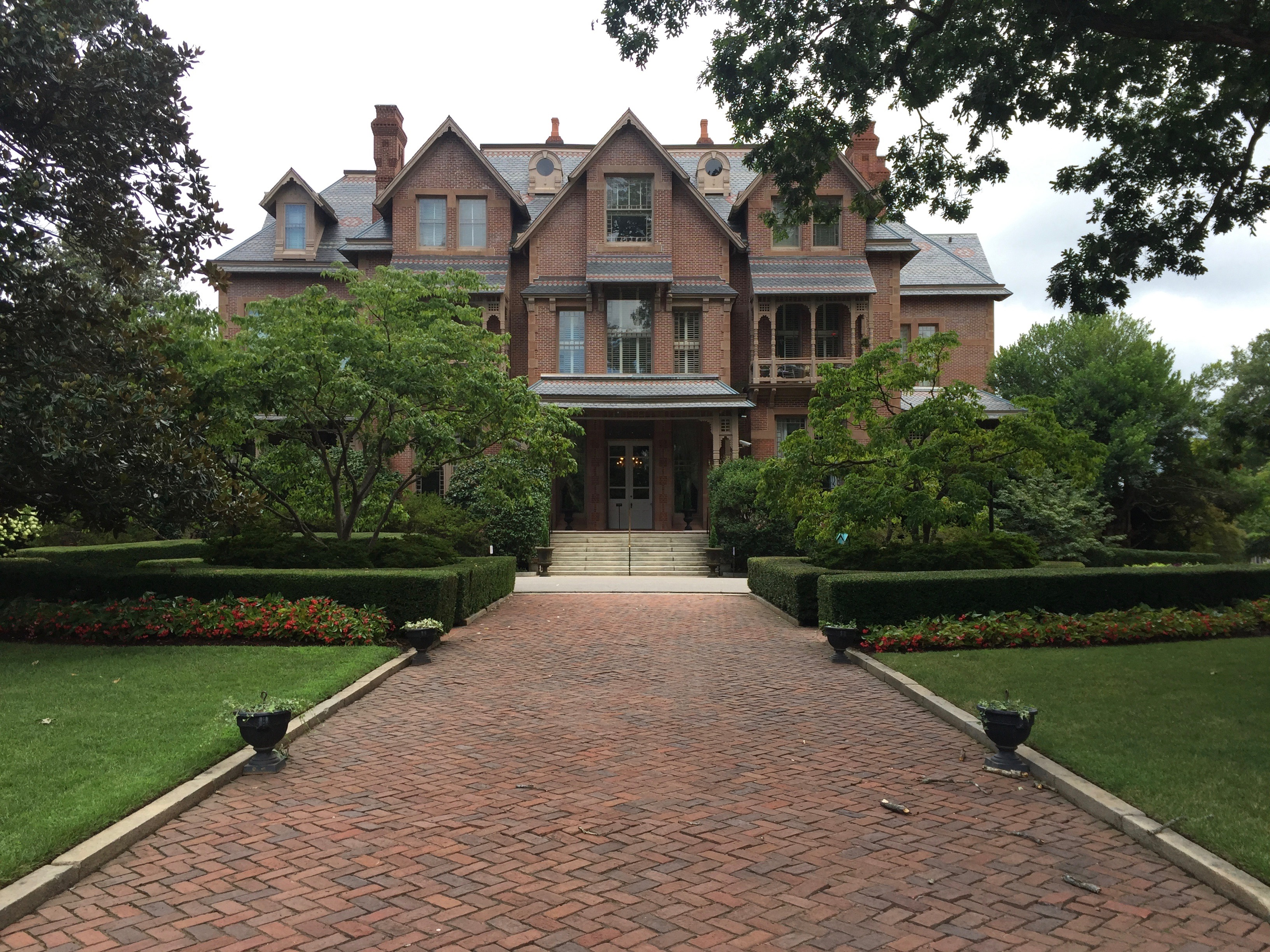
The North Carolina Executive Mansion in Raleigh is one of two official residences of the first lady of North Carolina

The spouse of the governor of North Carolina is given an honorary position, styled as First Lady or First Gentleman of the State of North Carolina. They are the official hosts at the North Carolina Executive Mansion in Raleigh and the Governor's Western Residence in Asheville. To date, there has been one woman governor of the State of North Carolina, Bev Perdue, and therefore her husband, Bob Eaves, was the state's first and only first gentleman. Two of the state's first ladies were daughters, not wives, of governors: Helen Whitaker Fowle served as first lady during the administration of her widowed father, Governor Daniel Gould Fowle, and Angelia Lawrance Morrison served as first lady during the term of her widowed father, Governor Cameron A. Morrison, until his marriage to Sara Virginia Ecker Watts on April 2, 1924.

Mary P. Easley, wife of Governor Mike Easley, was the state's first Catholic and first Greek American first lady.

The current first lady is Anna Harris Stein, wife of Governor Josh Stein.

== Lists ==
=== Lists of colonial first ladies ===
The following are lists of the first ladies of North Carolina during the Colonial period under British rule.

==== Roanoke Colony ====
The following is a list of the wives of governors of the Roanoke Colony at Fort Raleigh.

Name	Image	Term in office	Birth-Death	Governor	Notes
vacant		1585–1586		Sir Ralph Lane	Sir Ralph Lane never married
Tomasyn Cooper White		1587–1590		John White	

==== Albemarle Settlements ====
The following is a list of the wives of governors of the Albemarle Settlements.

Name	Image	Term in office	Birth-Death	Governor	Notes
Sarah Prescott Drummond		1664–1667		William Drummond	
Frances Culpeper Stephens		1667–1669	circa 1634 – circa 1690	Samuel Stephens	
vacant		1670–1672		Peter Carteret	no record of Carteret's marriage
Johanna Gerald Jenkins		1672–1675		John Jenkins	husband's first term
Name unknown		1675–1676		Thomas Eastchurch	Name left off records
Johanna Gerald Jenkins		1676–1677		John Jenkins	husband's second term
vacant		1677		Thomas Miller	no record of Miller's marriage
Dorothy Tooke Harvey		1679	died 1682	John Harvey	
Johanna Gerald Jenkins		1680–1681		John Jenkins	husband's third term
Anna Willix Riscoe Blount Sothel		1682–1689	died before May 1695	Seth Sothel	

==== Province of Carolina ====
The following is a list of the wives of governors and deputy governors of the Province of Carolina.

Name	Image	Term in office	Birth-Death	Governor	Notes
Frances Culpeper Stephens Berkeley Ludwell		1689–1691	circa 1634 – circa 1690	Philip Ludwell	her second marriage to a NC governor
Name unknown		1691–1694		Thomas Jarvis	
Ann Dobson Archdale		1694–1696		John Archdale	
Sarah Catherine Laker Harvey		1696–1699	died circa 1730	Thomas Harvey	
Ann Lillington Walker		1699–1704	1679–1732	Henderson Walker	
Martha Wainwright Daniel		1704–1705		Robert Daniell	
Name unknown		1705–1708		Thomas Cary	
Mary Davis Glover		1706–1706	died before 1707	William Glover	died in office
Catherine "Catalina" Atwood Glover		1706–1708		William Glover	Glover's second wife, married in office
Name unknown		1708–1711		Thomas Cary	husband's second term
Catherine Rigby Hyde		1711–1712	died 1738	Edward Hyde	

==== Province of North Carolina ====
The following is a list of the wives of governors of the Province of North Carolina. The last three provincial governors and their wives resided at Tryon Palace in New Bern.

Name	Image	Term in office	Birth-Death	Governor	Notes
Esther Wilkinson Pollock		1712–1714	died 1716	Thomas Pollock	
Penelope Golland Eden		1714–1716	1677–1716	Charles Eden	died in office
vacant		1722		Thomas Pollock	second term, widowed
Jane Reed		1722–1724		William Reed	
Name unknown		1724–1725		George Burrington	
Susannah Kidder Everard, Lady Everard		1725–1731	1683–1739	Sir Richard Everard, 4th Baronet	
Name unknown		1731–1734		George Burrington	
Mary Bursey Rice		1734		Nathaniel Rice	
Penelope Golland Maule Lovick Phenney Johnston		1734–1741	died 1741	Gabriel Johnston	died in office
Frances Button Johnston		1741–1752	died 1768	Gabriel Johnston	Johnston's second wife
Mary Bursey Rice		1752–1753	died 1753	Nathaniel Rice	husband's second term
Elizabeth Rowan Rowan		1753–1754		Matthew Rowan	
Justina Davis Dobbs		1754–1765	1745–1771	Arthur Dobbs	
Margaret Wake Tryon		1764–1771	c.1732 – 1819	William Tryon	
no record		1771		James Hasell	
Elizabeth Martin Martin		1771–1776	1732–1778	Josiah Martin	went into exile during the American Revolution

=== List of First Ladies and Gentlemen of the State of North Carolina ===
The following is a list of first ladies and gentlemen of the U.S. state of North Carolina. From 1816 to 1865, during the Antebellum period and the Civil War, the first ladies resided at the Governor's Palace in Raleigh. The official residences of the governors and their families are now the North Carolina Executive Mansion in Raleigh and the Governor's Western Residence in Asheville.

Name	Image	Term in office	Birth-Death	Governor	Notes
Sarah Heritage Caswell		1776–1780	1740–1794	Richard Caswell	first First Lady of the State of North Carolina
Mary Whiting Jones Nash		1780–1781	1754–1800	Abner Nash	
Mary Freeman Burke		1781–1782		Thomas Burke	
vacant		1782–1785		Alexander Martin	
Sarah Heritage Caswell		1785–1787	1740–1794	Richard Caswell	husband's second term
Frances Cathcart Johnston		1787–1789	1751–1801	Samuel Johnston	
vacant		1789–1792		Alexander Martin	
Mary Jones Leech Spaight		1792–1795	1765–1810	Richard Dobbs Spaight	
Elizabeth Jones Merrick Ashe		1795–1798	1735–1815	Samuel Ashe	
Sarah Jones Davie		1798–1799	1762–1802	William Richardson Davie	
Elizabeth Chauncey Jones Williams		1799–1802	1762–1817	Benjamin Williams	
Elizabeth Montfort Ashe		1802		John Baptista Ashe	husband died before taking office
Ann Cochran Turner		1802–1805	died 1806	James Turner	
Margaret Polk Alexander		1805–1807	circa 1764–1806	Nathaniel Alexander	
Elizabeth Chauncey Jones Williams		1807–1808	1762–1817	Benjamin Williams	husband's second term
Hannah Turner Stone		1808–1810	1776–1816	David Stone	
Sarah Rhett Dry Smith		1810–1811	circa 1762–1821	Benjamin Smith	
Ann Swepson Boyd Hawkins		1811–1814		William Hawkins	
Lydia Anna Evans Miller		1814–1817	died 1818	William Miller	
Elizabeth Foort Branch		1817–1820	1787–1851	John Branch	
Maria Perkins Franklin		1820–1821	1765–1834	Jesse Franklin	
Mary Smith Hunter Holmes		1821–1824	died 1838	Gabriel Holmes	
Sarah Wales Jones Burton		1824–1827		Hutchins Gordon Burton	
Frances Johnston Treadwell Iredell		1827–1828	1797–1865	James Iredell Jr.	
Lucy Ann Brown Owen		1828–1830	1793–1853	John Owen	
Rachel Montgomery Stokes		1830–1832	(1776–1862)	Montfort Stokes	
Eleanor White Swain		1832–1835	1800–1883	David L. Swain	
vacant		1835–1836		Richard Dobbs Spaight Jr.	never married
Elizabeth Henry Haywood Dudley	60x	1836–1840	1796–1840	Edward Bishop Dudley	died in office
Ann Eliza Lindsay Morehead		1841–1845	(1804–1868)	John Motley Morehead	
Susannah Sarah Washington Graham		1845–1849	1816–1890	William Alexander Graham	
Charity Hare Haywood Manly		1849–1851	1799–1881	Charles Manly	
Henrietta Williams Settle Reid		1851–1854	1824–1913	David Settle Reid	
vacant		1854–1855		Warren Winslow	widower
Isabella Cuthbert Bragg		1855–1859	1820–1877	Thomas Bragg	
Mary McKinley Daves Ellis		1859–1861	1835–1916	John Willis Ellis	North Carolina secedes from the Union and joines the Confederate States of America
Mary Weeks Parker Hargrave Clark		1861–1862	1822–1896	Henry Toole Clark	Confederate States of America
Harriett Newell Espy Vance		1862–1865	1832–1878	Zebulon Vance	Confederate States of America
vacant		May 13, 1865 – May 29, 1865		vacant	Office vacated after the American Civil War
Louisa Virginia Harrison Holden		1865	1830–1900	William Woods Holden	provisional appointment by President Andrew Johnson
Martitia Daniel Worth		1865–1868	1808–1874	Jonathan Worth	
Louisa Virginia Harrison Holden		1868–1871	1830–1900	William Woods Holden	husband's second term
Minerva Ruffin Cain Caldwell		1871–1874	1820–1890	Tod Robinson Caldwell	
vacant		1874–1877		Curtis Hooks Brogden	never married
Harriett Newell Espy Vance		1877–1879	1832–1878	Zebulon Vance	husband's second term
Mary Woodson Jarvis		1879–1885	1842–1924	Thomas J. Jarvis	
Catherine Bullock Henderson Scales		1885–1889	1845–1930	Alfred Moore Scales	
Helen Whitaker Fowle		1889–1891	1869–1948	Daniel Gould Fowle	daughter of Governor Fowle
Louisa Moore Holt		1891–1893	1833–1899	Thomas Michael Holt	
Eleanor Kearny Carr		1893–1897	1840–1912	Elias Carr	
Sarah Amanda Sanders Russell		1897–1901	1844–1913	Daniel Lindsay Russell	
Cora Lily Woodard Aycock		1901–1905	1868–1952	Charles Brantley Aycock	
Cornelia Deaderick Glenn		1905–1909	1854–1926	Robert Broadnax Glenn	
Musette Satterfield Kitchin		1909–1913	1874–1956	William Walton Kitchin	
Annie Burgin Craig		1913–1917	1873–1955	Locke Craig	
Fanny Neal Yarborough Bickett		1917–1921	1870–1941	Thomas Walter Bickett	
Angelia Lawrance Morrison Harris		1921–1924	1912–1983	Cameron A. Morrison	daughter of Governor Morrison
Sara Virginia Ecker Watts Morrison		1924-1925	1868–1950	Cameron A. Morrison	married in office
Margaret French McLean		1925–1929	1879–1959	Angus Wilton McLean	
Fay Webb-Gardner		1929–1933	1885–1969	Oliver Max Gardner	
Tillie Ehringhaus		1933–1937	1890–1980	John C. B. Ehringhaus	
Margaret Gardner Hoey		1937–1941	1875–1942	Clyde R. Hoey	
Alice Willson Broughton		1941–1945	1889–1980	J. Melville Broughton	
Mildred Stafford Cherry		1945–1949	1894–1971	R. Gregg Cherry	
Mary White Scott		1949–1953	1897–1972	W. Kerr Scott	
Merle Davis Umstead		1953–1954	1901–1988	William B. Umstead	husband died in office
Martha Blakeney Hodges		1954–1961	1897–1969	Luther H. Hodges	
Margaret Rose Sanford		1961–1965	1918–2006	Terry Sanford	
Jeanelle Coulter Moore		1965–1969	1911–1999	Dan K. Moore	
Jessie Rae Scott		1969–1973	1929–2010	Robert W. Scott	
Patricia Hollingsworth Holshouser		1973–1977	1939–2006	James Holshouser	
Carolyn Hunt		1977–1985	born 1937	Jim Hunt	
Dottie Martin		1985–1993	1937—2026	James G. Martin	
Carolyn Hunt		1993–2001	born 1937	Jim Hunt	husband's second term
Mary P. Easley		2001–2009		Mike Easley	
Bob Eaves		2009–2013		Bev Perdue	First Gentleman
Ann McCrory		2013–2017	born 1956	Pat McCrory	
Kristin Cooper		2017–2025	born 1956	Roy Cooper	
Anna Harris Stein		2025–present		Josh Stein	

== See also ==
- List of colonial governors of North Carolina
- List of governors of North Carolina
- List of governors of the Province of North Carolina
