= James Innes (British Army officer, died 1759) =

Colonial American general (c. 1700–1759)

Colonel James Innes
- Born: c. 1700; Canisbay, Caithness, Scotland
- Died: 5 September 1759 (aged 58–59) near Castle Hayne, North Carolina
- Burial place: New Hanover County, North Carolina
- Military career
- Allegiance: Kingdom of Great Britain
- Branch: British Army; Provincial Militia
- Service years: 1740–1756
- Rank: Colonel
- Conflicts: War of Jenkins' Ear; Battle of Cartagena de Indias; King George's War; French and Indian War

James Innes (c. 1700 – 5 September 1759) was an American military commander and political figure in the Province of North Carolina who led troops both at home and abroad in the service of the Kingdom of Great Britain. Innes was given command of a company of North Carolina's provincial soldiers during the War of Jenkins' Ear, and served as Commander-in-Chief of all colonial soldiers in the Ohio River Valley in 1754 during the French and Indian War. After resigning his commission in 1756, Innes retired to his home on the Cape Fear River. A bequest made by Innes upon his death led to the establishment of Innes Academy in Wilmington, North Carolina.

== Early life and emigration ==
Innes was born around 1700 in the Scottish Highlands. In 1732, Innes purchased 320 acres (130 ha; 0.50 sq mi) on the Cape Fear River in what is now Bladen County, North Carolina. In or about 1733, he received an additional grant of 640 acres (260 ha; 1.00 sq mi). Shortly after Innes's arrival in North Carolina, Governor Gabriel Johnston appointed him as a justice for New Hanover County, and tried unsuccessfully to appoint Innes to his council.

== Military and political career ==
=== War of Jenkins' Ear ===
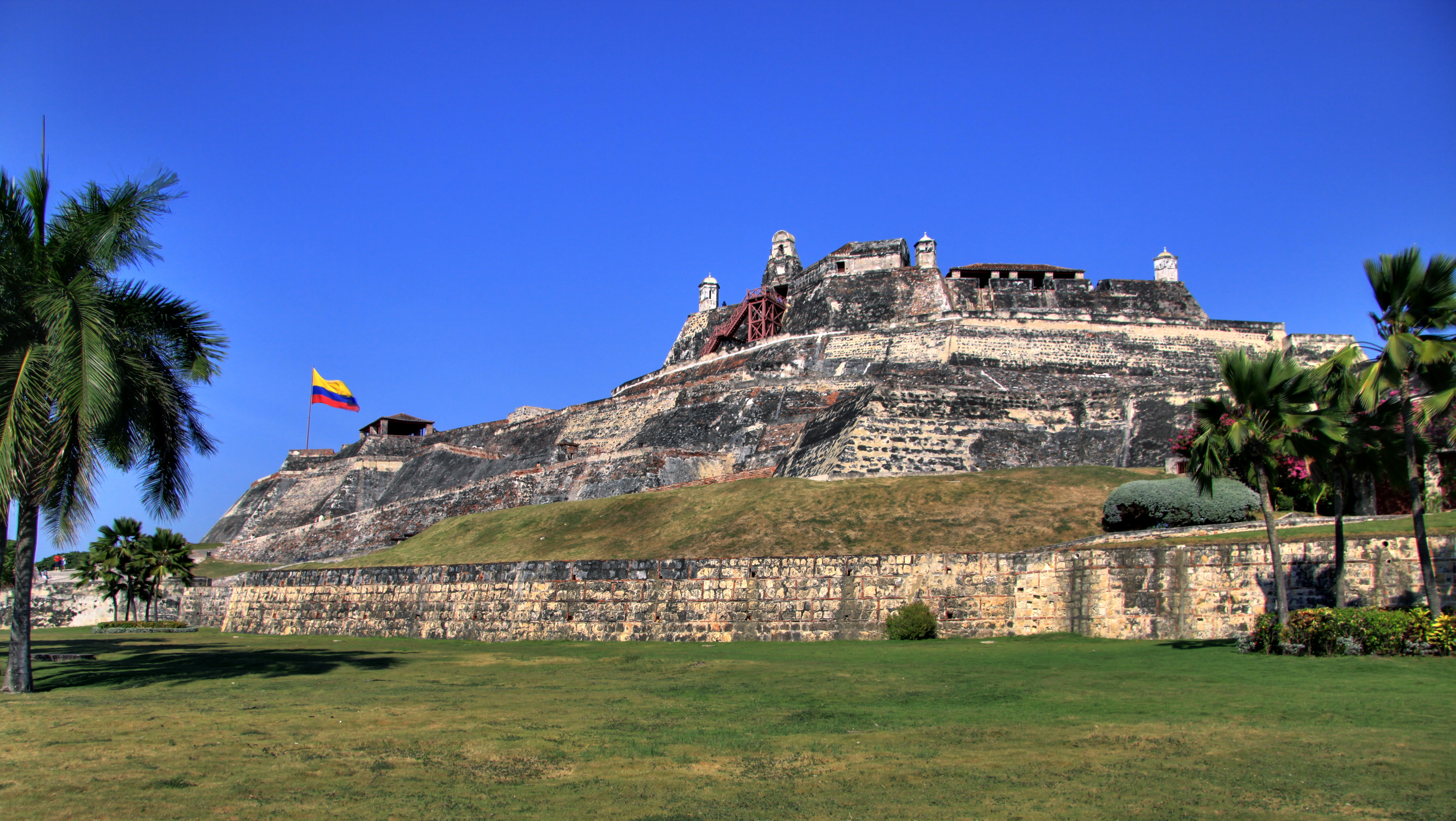
A modern-day photograph of Castillo San Felipe de Barajas, site of much of the land-based fighting during the Battle of Cartagena de Indias

In 1739, war broke out between Spain and Great Britain over the respective powers' colonial possessions and spheres of influence. At the outset of that conflict, the British requested that their colonies supply troops for an expedition to South America. Innes was selected by Governor Johnston to lead a company of 100 men from the Cape Fear region to Cartagena in the Spanish Viceroyalty of New Granada, a city which is located in the modern-day country of Colombia. The Cape Fear company was to be joined by three other companies raised in the Albemarle Sound region. Innes was granted a provincial commission as Captain in the British Army on 7 June 1740.

Upon arriving in South America, Innes and his men, as well as North Carolina's three Albemarle companies, were placed under the direct command of Colonel William Gooch, a baronet and the Governor of Virginia. The fever- and disease-ridden campaign, which culminated in the Battle of Cartagena de Indias in the Spring of 1741, was disastrous for the British. At Cartagena, delays by the British fleet in landing troops to assault a key Spanish fortification, combined with the fact that the ladders used by British scaling parties were shorter than the walls they were intended for, caused the militia and regular soldiers to suffer a 50 percent casualty rate prior to the assault being called off. The Cartagena campaign left only 25 survivors under Innes's command. The North Carolina contingent returned home in January 1743.

Innes was placed in command of the New Hanover militia after his return. In 1748, after the war between the British and Spanish had expanded into a wider war against the French known in the colonies as King George's War, a Spanish fleet attacked Brunswick Town, North Carolina, and Innes assisted the local militia under Captain William Dry in repulsing the raiding force.

=== Inter-war career ===
Between the War of Jenkins' Ear and the French and Indian War, Innes served as a commissioner for John Carteret, 2nd Earl Granville, charged with the sale of that proprietor's lands in the Granville District. Active in the colonial government, Innes was a baron of the Court of Exchequer in Wilmington. There he was associated with Francis Corbin and the Salisbury Land Office (as a land grant agent). After 1750, Innes served on the Governor's Council under both Gabriel Johnston and Arthur Dobbs until his death in 1759.

=== French and Indian War ===
After the conclusion of King George's War in 1748, tension increased on the frontier between the French-held North American territory and the British colonies on the coast. With the possibility of the outbreak of war in 1754, Innes, as an experienced soldier, was nominated as the commander of North Carolina militia, which was to be sent to aid Virginia at the request of Governor Robert Dinwiddie. The government of Virginia in particular feared French incursions, as it claimed much of the territory in the Ohio River Valley. Dinwiddie, a fellow Scot, had become friends with Innes, and considered naming him as Commander-in-Chief of the provincial forces, but instead chose to name Virginian Joshua Fry. Fry's death on 15 May 1754 left the position vacant, and Innes was appointed on 4 June 1754, although George Washington had been Fry's second-in-command.

Washington was given command of the Virginia Regiment upon Fry's death, and he led that unit into the Ohio River Valley on Dinwiddie's orders before Innes was appointed his superior. On 28 May 1754, Washington's unit, along with native Mingo allies, surprised a French unit, killing Joseph Coulon de Jumonville, the unit's commander. A large force of French soldiers then advanced to trap Washington, and on 3 July 1754, assaulted him at Fort Necessity near what is now Farmington, Pennsylvania, and forced the Virginian's surrender. Dinwiddie blamed Matthew Rowan, the acting Governor of North Carolina, for the defeat, stating that had Innes's men been assembled in a timely fashion, they could have accompanied Washington to the frontier. Nevertheless, this engagement signaled the beginning of colonial combat between the French and English, which by 1755 had erupted into open war.

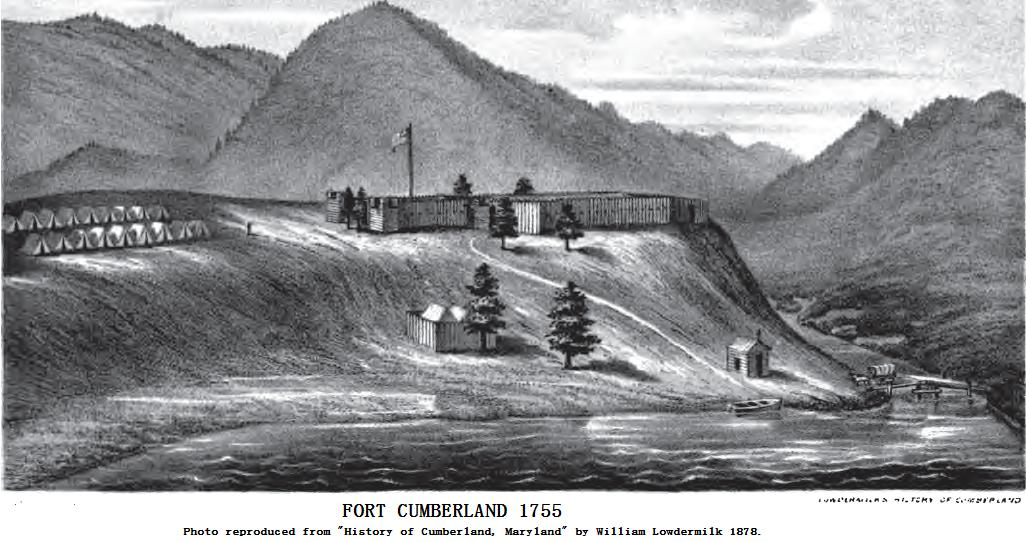
Fort Cumberland as it likely appeared during the French and Indian War

Innes's tenure as commander-in-chief had scarcely begun at the onset of the French and Indian War. Innes was directed to go to Wills Creek in Maryland, and to reinforce a fort there, which was to become Fort Cumberland. The North Carolina soldiers that came to Virginia were unruly and difficult to manage, eventually deserting after being informed that their pay was to be reduced, or returning home after Innes himself disbanded the unit due to its instability. To make matters worse, Virginians under Innes's command were ill-disposed towards him, particularly because he was not a Virginian himself.

Within five months of Innes's appointment, Horatio Sharpe relieved him of his command, and Innes stayed on at Fort Cumberland as its "campmaster general". When General Edward Braddock arrived with a force of British regulars in 1755, Innes was named Governor of Fort Cumberland. Braddock tasked Innes with commanding a reserve force of troops at the fort during the disastrous Braddock expedition, in which Braddock led an army into the Ohio valley where it was ambushed and routed, leaving the general mortally wounded. During that operation, Fort Cumberland was used as a holding area for wounded and sick soldiers. Innes was among the first to hear of Braddock's defeat, and one of the first to inform Dinwiddie, by way of Lord Fairfax, of the catastrophe. By the mid-1756, Innes was permitted to resign his commission and return to North Carolina.

== Retirement and death ==
Coat of Arms of James Innes

Innes lived out the remainder of his life as a planter at "Point Pleasant", his plantation in North Carolina. He died on 5 September 1759 and left behind his wife Jean.

=== Legacy ===
After his death in 1759, Innes's will left a bequest for an academy, to be called the Innes Academy. The Academy constructed what became the Thalian Hall in Wilmington, North Carolina, which exists today. Innes Street, the main east–west thoroughfare in Salisbury, North Carolina, is named after him.
