= Granville District =

Former area of Virginia

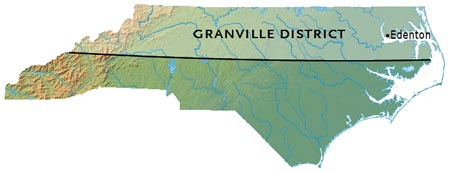
The approximate location of the dividing line between the Granville District and the Royal territory

The Granville District, also known as the Granville Grant, was an approximately 60-mile wide strip of land in North Carolina adjoining the boundary with Virginia, lying between north latitudes 35° 34' and 36° 30'. From 1663 until 1779, the district was held under control of the descendants of Sir George Carteret, one of the original lords proprietor of Carolina. After 1729, the Granville District's land allotment totaled nearly half of the land in North Carolina.

In 1767, North Carolina Governor William Tryon, described the Granville District in a letter to the Earl of Shelburne:

His Lordship's District contains nearly one Degree of Latitude, and better than five Degrees of Longitude, from Currituck Inlet to... the western boundary... There is thirteen counties in his Lordship's District, the two westernmost of which counties contain a tract more than ten times the contents of Rhode Island.

One of the 13 counties in the district – which contained altogether about 20 million acres of land – was 60 miles (97 km) square, while another was more than twice as large, measuring 150 miles (240 km) by 60 miles.

== Background ==
The area that became the Granville District had been a part of the Province of Carolina, which was a proprietary colony under the control of eight Lords Proprietors from 1663 to 1729. In 1729, seven of the eight heirs to the original Lords Proprietors decided to sell their shares back to The Crown.

The eighth share belonged to Lord Carteret, great-grandson of original Lord Proprietor, Sir George Carteret. He surrendered any future participation in the colonial government in order to retain ownership of his share of the colony's land.

== Colonial interests ==
Due to political reversals in England, Carteret was unable to attend to his colonial interests until 1742. Then he appointed the first of several agents to operate on his authority for the district that he never visited in person. In 1742, the king's Privy Council agreed to Carteret's request to plan his allotment. The task was given to Samuel Warner, a London surveyor, who determined that Carteret was entitled to fifty-six and a quarter minutes of north latitude. The northern boundary was to be the Virginia–North Carolina border (36° 30') making the southern line at 35° 34'. In 1743, the initial portion of the boundary line was surveyed by a commission appointed jointly by Carteret and North Carolina Governor Gabriel Johnston. As the frontier pushed further westward, the boundary line was extended in 1746, and again in 1753.

== The Granville District ==
In 1744, Carteret inherited the title, Earl of Granville, and from that time on, the district became known as Granville's district or simply, the Granville District. After the 1753 extension, other area land owners, including governor Arthur Dobbs, began to complain that the line had been run up to 13 and a half miles too far to the south. This caused some resentment of Granville's district because the royal government of North Carolina was still responsible for the security and upkeep of the area, but did not receive any revenue from it.

== Irregularities ==
About 1750, Granville began to become concerned about irregularities in the accounts from his agents in regards to the issuance of land grants. He issued explicit instructions to his agents about keeping records and executing grants. Despite Granville's instructions, complaints (particularly regarding allegations of exorbitant fees) from land holders and prospective purchasers increased throughout the decade. One such problem involved Henry McCulloh, who had received a large royal grant of land, some of which lay within Granville's district. Granville gave McCulloh permission to settle the land. But in 1752, he learned that his agents had issued grants on McCulloh's land. McCulloh and Granville disputed the areas, sometimes threatening legal action. They eventually were able to negotiate a series of agreements.

== Problems grow ==
After Granville's death in 1763, the situation became more muddled. Settlers were unable to obtain clear title to their land. This state of affairs finally led to outbreaks of violence in 1770, known as the War of the Regulation (centered in modern-day Alamance County), which had to be put down by Governor William Tryon.

Although Granville's son, Robert Carteret, 3rd Earl Granville, had considered selling the land back to The Crown to dis-encumber himself, he never acted. The situation continued to get worse as records were no longer being kept accurately. When the younger Granville died in February 1776, American revolutionary fervor was already strong and the proprietorship of the Granville district had become identified with British interests.

== Confiscated ==
In 1777, the North Carolina General Assembly declared the state sovereign over all the lands between Virginia and South Carolina, although it recognized claims to land granted by the crown and proprietors prior to July 4, 1776. The Assembly called for the confiscation of all lands and property of persons who supported the British. Granville's lands were confiscated by the State of North Carolina in 1777; and McCulloh's in 1779.

Following the war, the Carteret heirs were compensated in part for the loss of their lands.
