= George Burrington =

British colonial official

His Excellency George Burrington

3rd and 5th Governor of North Carolina
- In office 15 January 1724 – 17 July 1725
- Monarch: George I
- Preceded by: William Reed (acting)
- Succeeded by: Sir Richard Everard
- In office 25 February 1731 – 17 April 1734
- Monarch: George II
- Preceded by: Sir Richard Everard
- Succeeded by: Nathaniel Rice (acting)

Personal details
- Born: ca. 1682 Devonshire, England
- Died: 22 February 1759 Westminster, England
- Cause of death: Homicide
- Resting place: St. John the Evangelist, Westminster
- Spouse: Sarah Croswell (m. 1730)

George Burrington (ca. 1682 – 22 February 1759) was a British colonial official who served as the third and fifth governor of North Carolina from 1724 to 1725 and 1731 to 1734. He is noted for opening the lower Cape Fear region to settlement. From the outset of his administration, he encountered opposition to his authority. In 1733 he noted that African slave ships did not bring their trade to his colony.

== Early and family life ==
Burrington was born in Devonshire, England. The register of Sampford Courtenay, recorded the baptism of a George Burrington on 14 November 1685. His parents were listed as John and Mary Burrington. John Burrington was the son of Gilbert Burrington. Notwithstanding his rough exterior, George Burrington seems to have been a man of education; and the sale of his books shows that he was not unprovided with literature at a time when libraries were few and scattered.

== North Carolina proprietary and royal governor ==
Burrington's two terms years as proprietary governor of North Carolina were fraught with controversy. The first term which began on 15 January 1724 ended little more than a year later after a dispute over an alleged fraudulent will of former governor Charles Eden (who had died in 1722) led by August 1724 to physical confrontations with Christopher Gale, a powerful landowner and politician who also served terms as the colony's chief justice, and even a raid on Gale's house that August. That prompted Gale to return to England and seek Burrington's removal, returning with the appropriate documentation the following July. Burrington's removal ended threats to North Carolina lands from Eden's English hairs, and Sir Richard Everard became governor. For a while Everard appeared to rule with the assistance of Gale and his sons in law William Clayton and William Little (whom Burrington had initially appointed as the colony's attorney general) as well as provincial secretary John Lovick, who also married one of the North Carolina heirs and administered Eden's estate (and made Everard, Gale and his brother alternate executors with instructions to give nothing to the English heirs). However, Gale, Little and Lovick were accused of enriching themselves in the "blank patent" fraud controversy. Factionalism and physical confrontations also recurred, as Gale's faction that controlled the colony's General Court indicted Everard and Lovick for partisan assaults, and the former attorney for Eden's English heirs (now judge of the local Court of Vice-Admiralty) ordered Little and Gale briefly jailed in 1728.

Burrington likely remained in North Carolina until 1729, shortly after sale of North Carolina and South Carolina by their Lords Proprietor to the Crown. Burrington returned to England, then returned to be sworn in as North Carolina's first royal governor on 25 February 1731. During this term, Burrington made internal improvements, especially in the Cape Fear region near his home. However, although Burrington made peace with Lovick and praised his expertise in Indian affairs as well as appointed him to the Governor's Council, this term also became controversy-filled. His now-ally John Lovick died (childless) and Burrington asserted Lovick's debts exceeded the value of his plantations, which Lovick's widow Penelope Galland contested. Burrington attempted to control matters by reappointing Gale and Lovick's brother Thomas Lovick to the General Court and making Little as chief justice. By the spring of 1733, former Chief Justice William Smith traveled to England seeking Burrington's dismissal, although Burrington's successor, governor Gabriel Johnston, did not arrive in the colony until November 1734.

== Death and legacy ==
Burrington's last will and testament was dated 8 December 1750. That may have been written after another personal attack of which no documentation survives. Burrington died in Westminster's St. James Park during an apparent robbery attempt on 22 February 1759, during which the 70 year old wrestled with his attackers, but fell or was thrown into a canal and drowned. He was buried at St. John the Evangelist two days later.

== Works ==
- An Answer to Dr. William Brakenridge's Letter Concerning the Number of Inhabitants, within the London Bills of Mortality. Wherein the Doctor's Letter is inserted at large, his Arguments proved inclusive, and the Number of Inhabitants increasing (1757)
- Seasonable Considerations on the Expediency of a War with France; Arising from a faithful Review of the State of both Kingdoms. To which are Added a Postscript, on the List of the French Army, a Short Comparison Between the British and French Dominions; and a State of the French Revenues, and Forces in the Year, 1701 (1743)

== See also ==
- List of unsolved murders in the United Kingdom

Government offices
Preceded by William Reed; Acting	Governor of North Carolina; 1724–1725	Succeeded by Sir Richard Everard
Preceded by Sir Richard Everard	Governor of North Carolina; 1731–1734	Succeeded by Nathaniel Rice; Acting
