= Justice Gale =

Justice Gale may refer to:

- Christopher Gale (1670–1735), chief justice of the Colony of North Carolina
- George Alexander Gale (1906–1997), chief justice for the province of Ontario
- William H. Gale (fl. 1860s), associate justice of the Colorado Territorial Supreme Court
