= Hawfields, North Carolina =

- Unincorporated community
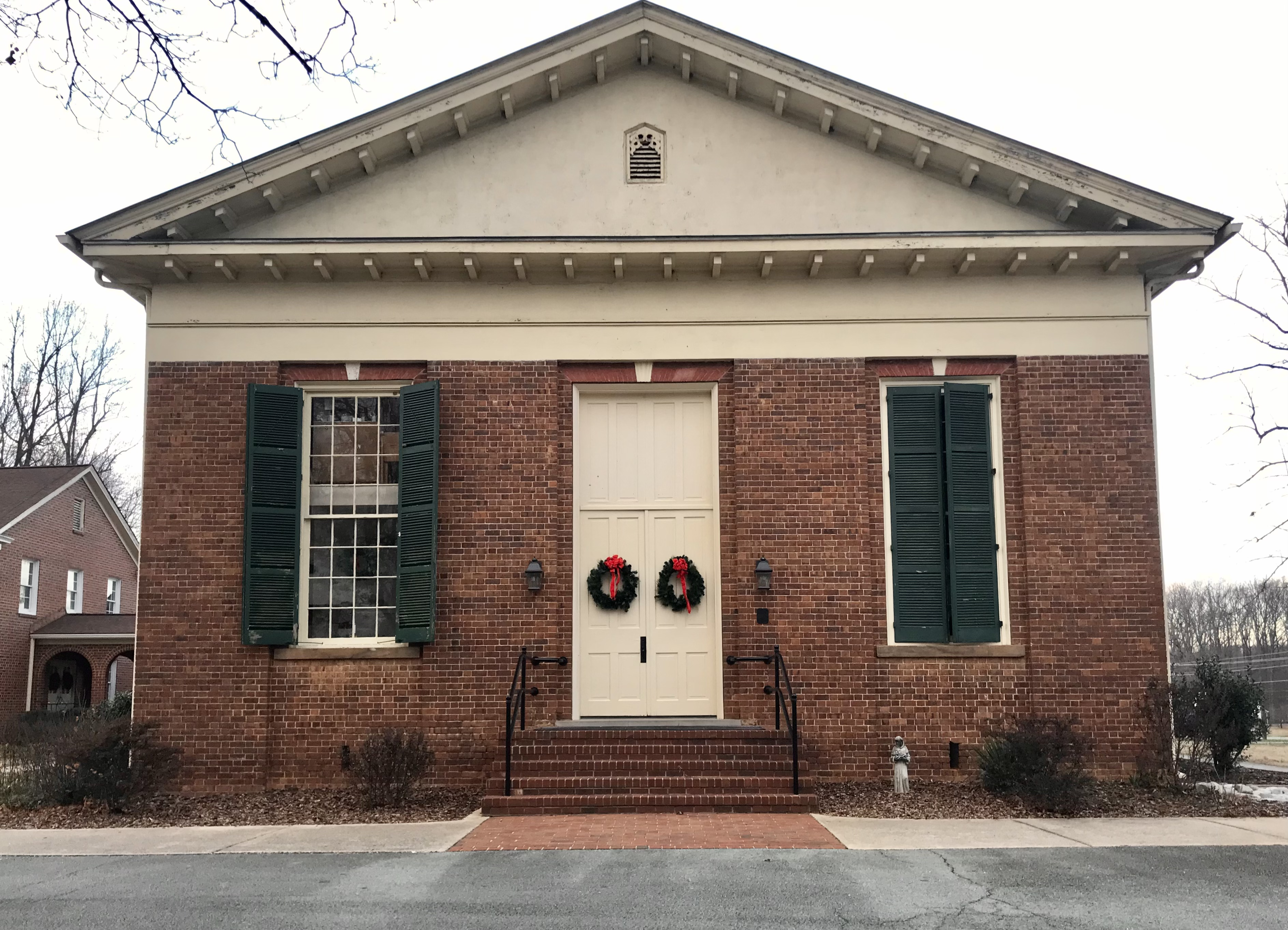
- Hawfields Presbyterian Church

- Location of Hawfields in North Carolina Hawfields, North Carolina (the United States)
- Coordinates: 36°03′32″N 79°18′22″W
- Country: United States
- State: North Carolina
- County: Alamance
- Elevation: 653 ft (199 m)
- Time zone: UTC-5 (Eastern (EST))
  - Summer (DST): UTC-4 (EDT)
- ZIP code: 27302
- Area code: 919
- GNIS feature ID: 1020642

Hawfields is an unincorporated community in Alamance County, North Carolina, United States.

Hawfields was first populated by Ulster Irish settlers and Western African slaves as early as the 18th century, but a firm establishment was not achieved until 1740–1750 and was originally called "Haw Old Fields" by the settlers because of the Haw River which runs partially through Hawfields and neighboring Mebane.

Hawfields is located on North Carolina Highway 119, southwest of Mebane. It is one of the oldest communities in Alamance County, being referenced in historical works on the Sissipahaw. It is the site of the oldest church in Alamance County, Hawfields Presbyterian Church, which is on the National Register of Historic Places. This church was the seat of Orange Presbytery, which was formed in 1770.

== Notable people ==
- Alexander Mebane, member of the United States House of Representatives. The nearby city of Mebane is named after him.
- Thomas Samuel Ashe, member of the United States House of Representatives and Congress of the Confederate States
- Mary White Scott, First Lady of North Carolina
- W. Kerr Scott, Governor, 1949–52, U.S. Senator, 1955-58
