= Governor Reed =

Governor Reed may refer to:

- Clyde M. Reed (1871–1949), 24th Governor of Kansas
- Harrison Reed (politician) (1813–1899), 9th Governor of Florida
- John H. Reed (1921–2012), 67th Governor of Maine
- Joseph Reed (politician) (1741–1785), 3rd President of Pennsylvania
- William Reed (British colonial official) (c. 1670–1728), Acting Governor of North-Carolina from 1722 to 1724

== See also ==
- Governor Reid (disambiguation)
