= Governor Eden =

Governor Eden may refer to:

- Charles Eden (politician) (1673–1722), 2nd Governor of the Province of North Carolina from 1713 to 1722
- George Eden, 1st Earl of Auckland (1784–1849), Governor-General of India from 1836 to 1842
