= Christopher Gale =

American lawyer (1670–1735)

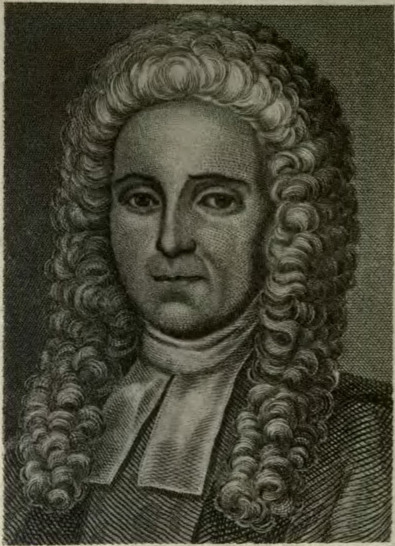
- Born: 1670; York, England
- Died: February 17, 1735 (aged 64–65); Edenton, North Carolina
- Occupation: Jurist
- Spouses: Sarah Laker Harvey; Sarah Catherine Ismay
- Children: 4

Christopher Gale (1670 – February 17, 1735) was the first Chief Justice of the Colony of North Carolina. He was also briefly Attorney General and a customs collector for various ports of North Carolina.

== Biography ==
Christopher Gale was born in 1670 (some sources say 1679) in York, the son of the Rev. Miles Gale and Margaret Stone. He read law under an attorney in Lancashire but Gale migrated to Carolina when he was in his early twenties, settling in Bath. He made his fortune in trade with the Indians. In 1702, Gale married Sarah Laker Harvey, widow of Governor Thomas Harvey. They had four children: Miles, Theophilus, Penelope and Elizabeth. He lived at Kirby Grange, a large plantation near Bath.

== Career as a Justice ==
In 1703, Proprietary Governor Robert Daniel appointed Gale to serve as a Justice of the General Court, the supreme court of the colony and in 1704, he concurrently was appointed attorney general of Carolina. Following the upheaval of Cary's Rebellion in 1708, Gale was removed from office as Chief Justice by Governor William Glover.

Gale traveled to London where the Lords Proprietors of the Carolina colony were meeting to lay his case for reinstatement before them. He was immediately reinstated.

Gale was a capable explorer and was slated to go with John Lawson and Baron Christoph de Graffenried on their fateful 1711 expedition into Indian territory. De Graffenreid and Lawson were captured by Tuscarora Indians and Lawson was killed. Gale was unable to join them due to his wife Susan's illness. Gale later reflected that her illness likely saved his life.

Later that year Governor Edward Hyde sent him to Charleston, South Carolina to secure military aid for the war against the Tuscarora Indians. On his return trip, Gale was captured by the French who held him briefly as a prisoner of war on Martinique. Finally arriving home in July 1712, Gale was rewarded for his service with a re-appointment as Chief Justice. He held that office, with only brief interruptions, until 1731, during which time he obtained commissions as collector of customs at the ports of Beaufort, Currituck, and Roanoke successively. He also briefly served as the absentee Attorney General of the Bahamas.

In 1729, Gale was appointed to a commission to determine the boundary between North Carolina and Virginia along with Colonel John Lovick and William Little.

== End of life ==
His wife Sarah died in 1730 and Gale married Sarah Catherine Ismay, widow of John Ismay, about 1733. Gale died in 1735 in Edenton, North Carolina leaving a will that stated, “To All my friends I leave my hearty prayers & Good wishes, To my Enemys forgiveness & prayers for their Repentance for the many ill offices done me.”

Several of his letters are printed in John Nichols's Illustrations, iv. 489–92.
