= Governor Hyde =

Governor Hyde may refer to:

- Edward Hyde (Governor of North Carolina) (1667–1712), 1st governor of the province of North Carolina in 1712
- Edward Hyde, 3rd Earl of Clarendon (1661–1723), Governor of the provinces of New Jersey and New York from 1702 to 1708
