= Thomas Cary (North Carolina politician) =

American colonial governor

4th Deputy Governor of North-Carolina
- In office 1705–1706
- Preceded by: Robert Daniell
- Succeeded by: William Glover (Acting)
- In office 1708–1711
- Preceded by: William Glover (Acting)
- Succeeded by: Edward Hyde (as Governor of North-Carolina)

Personal details
- Born: Buckinghamshire, England
- Died: c. 1718; Bath County, North-Carolina

Thomas Cary served as the fourth and last Deputy Governor of North-Carolina. He is best known for his role in the revolt known as Cary's Rebellion, between 1708 and 1711, in which he usurped power from then–Deputy Governor William Glover, driving Glover from the province.

== Biography ==
Thomas Cary was born in Buckinghamshire, England, to Walter Cary and Ann Dobson. Eventually, Cary moved to South Carolina, where he became a prominent "merchant and shipowner". In 1707, Cary joined the South Carolina assembly as the representative and speaker. The same year, he also was appointed governor of South Carolina until he was replaced by William Glover. However, he regained the government of the province in October 1708 thanks to support from dissenters. Cary abolished the laws of Glover and replaced officials suspected of being disloyal to the dissidents. He prompted the immigration of new settlers through the reformation of land grant policy. He ended his term in 1711.

In this year, when Edward Hyde was appointed the first Governor of the Province of North-Carolina (albeit before the Province's official separation from the Province of South Carolina), Cary put up resistance to Hyde's new authority, thus causing a revolt in the colony. Cary was eventually defeated and captured in Virginia, and Hyde took office as he had planned. In 1711, Virginia Governor Alexander Spotswood sent Cary and his supporters to London to subject them to trial. Cary was released in 1712 without suffering any punishment, "likely due to a lack of clear evidence". In 1713, Cary returned to North Carolina, living in Bath County until his death in July 1718.
