= Alfred Dockery =

American politician

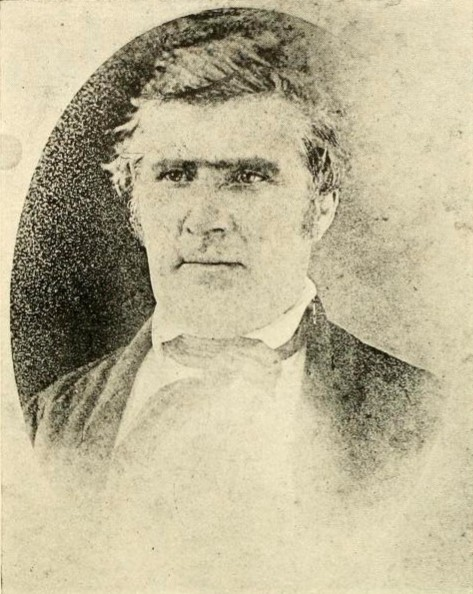
Alfred Dockery

Alfred Dockery (December 11, 1797 – December 3, 1873) was a U.S. representative from North Carolina.

== Early life and career ==
Alfred Dockery was born near Rockingham, North Carolina. He attended the public schools and engaged in planting. Dockery was a member of the North Carolina House of Commons in 1822. He was also the father of Oliver Hart Dockery, who was born in 1830. Dockery was a member of the State constitutional convention in 1835, where he advocated the liberal position "that free blacks should continue to be allowed to vote, which the convention rejected."

He then served in the North Carolina State Senate from 1836 to 1844.

Dockery was elected as a Whig to the Twenty-ninth Congress (March 4, 1845 – March 3, 1847). He declined to be a candidate for re-election in 1846 to the Thirtieth Congress, but was elected to the Thirty-second Congress (March 4, 1851 – March 3, 1853). He was the unsuccessful Whig candidate for Governor of North Carolina in 1854.

== Later life ==
After the Civil War, he mostly retired from public service and returned to being a planter for his remaining years. He was the National Union (Republican) candidate for governor in 1866, but he did not seek the nomination, or campaign for the position. The conservative incumbent Governor, Jonathan Worth, won the election easily amid low turnout.

Dockery died in Rockingham, Richmond County, N.C. and was interred there in the family cemetery.

The Alfred Dockery House near Rockingham was listed on the National Register of Historic Places in 1986.

== See also ==
- Twenty-ninth United States Congress
- Thirty-second United States Congress

== Notes ==
Party political offices
Preceded by John Kerr Jr.	Whig nominee for Governor of North Carolina; 1854	Succeeded by John Pool
Preceded by William Woods Holden	Republican nominee for Governor of North Carolina; 1866	Succeeded by William Woods Holden
U.S. House of Representatives
Preceded by Edmund Deberry	Member of the U.S. House of Representatives from North Carolina's 4th congressional district 1845–1847	Succeeded by Augustine H. Shepperd
Preceded by Edmund Deberry	Member of the U.S. House of Representatives from North Carolina's 3rd congressional district 1851–1853	Succeeded by William S. Ashe
