= Merle Davis Umstead =

American civic leader

First Lady of North Carolina
- In office January 8, 1953 – November 7, 1954
- Governor: William B. Umstead
- Preceded by: Mary White Scott
- Succeeded by: Martha Blakeney Hodges

Personal details
- Born: July 11, 1901 Bostic, North Carolina, U.S.
- Died: April 14, 1988 (aged 86) Durham, North Carolina, U.S.
- Resting place: Mount Tabor United Methodist Church Cemetery Rougemont, North Carolina
- Party: Democratic
- Spouse: William B. Umstead
- Children: 1
- Education: Duke University

Merle Holland Davis Umstead (July 11, 1901 – April 14, 1988) was an American educator, political hostess, and civic leader. She worked as a school principal and as a high school teacher prior to her marriage. As the wife of Governor William B. Umstead, she served as First Lady of North Carolina from 1953 to 1954. Widowed after her husband died during his term as governor, she and her daughter had to vacate the North Carolina Executive Mansion and returned to Durham, North Carolina. Umstead also served as the President of the Durham American Legion Auxiliary and served on the board of trustees of East Carolina University.

== Early life and education ==
Umstead was born Merle Holland Davis on July 11, 1901, in Bostic, North Carolina to Charles Daniel Davis and Daisy Washburn Davis. Her parents ran a store in the Sunshine community.

She attended the Normal and Collegiate Institute, a boarding school for girls in Asheville, graduating in 1919.

From 1921 to 1922, Umstead attended Trinity College (known as Duke University after 1924). She returned in 1923 to finish her degree, graduating with a bachelor's in English in 1926.

== Career ==
In 1923, she spent a year working for the Internal Revenue Service in Raleigh.

While a student at Duke University in the mid-1920s, Umstead was hired by a prominent family in Durham to help care for their children. In 1926, after graduating from Duke, she was hired as the principal at Sunshine School in Rutherford County. She later taught at Central High School in Rutherfordton.

== Marriage and family life ==
On September 5, 1929, she married the attorney William B. Umstead at Trinity United Methodist Church in Durham. The couple was originally introduced by the family who employed her as their nanny while she was a college student. Following her marriage, Umstead left teaching and became engaged in various civic activities in Durham. She served as President of the Durham American Legion Auxiliary and as a Sunday school teacher at Trinity United Methodist Church.

In 1933, her husband was elected to the United States House of Representatives. She and her husband moved into the Willard Hotel in Washington, D.C., which was a customary residence for members of the U.S. Congress and their spouses. While in Washington, she became active in society and often gave guided tours of the city to friends and constituents from North Carolina.

Her husband left the House after three terms and, in 1938, the couple returned to Durham. In 1942, Umstead gave birth to a daughter, also named Merle Umstead.

In 1946, her husband was appointed to the United States Senate following the death of Senator Josiah W. Bailey. Umstead and their daughter stayed behind to maintain their Durham residence while her husband returned to Washington, D.C.

== Public life ==
In 1952, Umstead's husband was elected as the Governor of North Carolina and was inaugurated on January 7, 1953, at which time she became the First Lady of North Carolina. Two days into her husband's term as governor, he suffered a heart attack. Due to his heart condition, Umstead took a more significant role in her husband's administration. She was responsible for managing the governor's schedule and had most of her husband's meetings held at the North Carolina Executive Mansion. As First Lady, she also determined which invitations the governor accepted and which events were important enough to attend.

Umstead managed the executive mansion without office staff, a social secretary, or an appointments manager. She did rely on the assistance of Laura M. Reilly, her housekeeper, and Daisy Washburn Davis, her mother. She gave guided tours of the mansion to school groups and prepared the mansion's floral arrangements with flowers sent from the prison farm. She collected Umstead and Davis family furniture and heirlooms to add to the mansion's decor.

On November 7, 1954, Umstead's husband died without having completed his term. She and her daughter had to vacate the executive mansion almost immediately and, without a permanent home, returned to Durham.

== Later life and death ==
Umstead eventually purchased a home in Durham that was designed by George Watts Carr.

She was a supporter of the Roanoke Island Historical Association and served as the association's leader in Durham County. From 1955 to 1961, she served as a member of the board of trustees of East Carolina University.

She died on April 14, 1988, and was buried at Mount Tabor United Methodist Church in Rougemont.

Honorary titles
Preceded by Mary White Scott	First Lady of North Carolina; 1953–1954	Succeeded by Martha Blakeney Hodges
