= Mildred Stafford Cherry =

First Lady of North Carolina

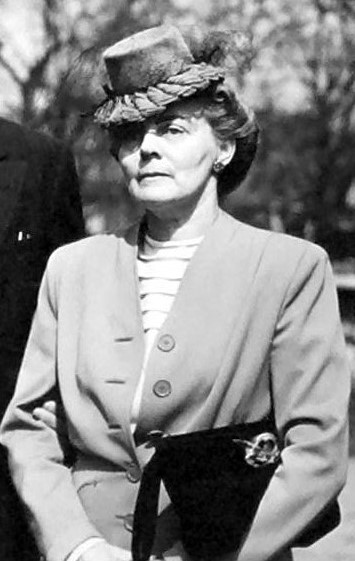
- Cherry in 1945

First Lady of North Carolina
- In office January 4, 1945 – January 6, 1949
- Governor: Robert Gregg Cherry
- Preceded by: Alice Willson Broughton
- Succeeded by: Mary White Scott

First Lady of Gastonia, North Carolina
- In office 1921–1923

Personal details
- Born: Lula Mildred Stafford; August 8, 1894 Statesville, North Carolina, U.S.
- Died: April 10, 1971 (aged 76) Gastonia, North Carolina, U.S.
- Resting place: Gaston Memorial Park
- Party: Democratic
- Spouse: Robert Gregg Cherry (m. 1921)
- Education: Greensboro College; Randolph Macon Women's College
- Occupation: teacher

Lula Mildred Stafford Cherry (August 8, 1894 – April 10, 1971) was an American schoolteacher and civic leader. She taught in Greensboro City Schools until her marriage to the lawyer and politician Robert Gregg Cherry in 1921. From 1945 to 1949, she served as the First Lady of North Carolina. Throughout her husband's tenure in the North Carolina General Assembly during World War II, she led efforts to support the war effort including the sale of war bonds and assisting in an appeal that enlisted 105 women for the Women's Army Corps. She was active within the Daughters of the American Revolution and the American Red Cross.

== Early life and education ==
Cherry was born Lula Mildred Stafford on August 8, 1894, in Statesville, North Carolina to Emory Junius Stafford and Lula Roberta Lowrey Stafford. She was one of seven children in an affluent family. When Cherry was one year old, the family moved to Greensboro. Her father served as the Mayor of Greensboro from 1909 to 1911 and again from 1917 to 1921.

She attended public schools in Greensboro and graduated from Greensboro High School, where she had been on the basketball team. She went on to attend Greensboro College for two years before transferring to Randolph Macon Women's College.

== Adult life ==
Cherry taught second grade in Greensboro City Schools until her marriage. She met Robert Gregg Cherry, a lawyer who was serving as the mayor of Gastonia, while attending a summer session of the Institute for Teachers in Gastonia. They married in Greensboro on June 28, 1921.

Following the end of her husband's term as governor, the couple moved back to Gastonia. Her husband died in 1957, which led Cherry to buy a new house. She died in Gastonia on April 10, 1971, and was buried in Gaston Memorial Park.

=== Public life ===
Upon her marriage, Cherry became First Lady of Gastonia. She was active in civic and social affairs in Gastonia, particularly in her work with the American Red Cross and as a member of the Daughters of the American Revolution. She also gardened and had a vast collection of antique china, particularly china demitasse coffee cups and dessert plates.

While her husband was serving in the North Carolina General Assembly during World War II, she led many activities in support of the war effort. Cherry encouraged the sale of war bonds and assisted in the state's appeal that helped North Carolina enlist 105 women for training as hospital technicians in the Women's Army Corps.

Although the war ended during her husband's first year as governor, wartime shortages still affected the people of North Carolina. She and her husband had planned on not having an inaugural ball, but changed their minds at the last minute. Due to a lack of food rationing stamps for punch, local dairies donated theirs for the ball. Due to the post-war shortages, Cherry entertained at the North Carolina Executive Mansion with a reduced annual budget of $2,500. She preferred simpler events for local organizations and state legislators to the lavish, expensive affairs for national and international dignitaries. During their tenure in the executive mansion, Cherry hosted First Lady Eleanor Roosevelt, General Dwight D. Eisenhower, President Harry S. Truman, First Lady Bess Truman, First Daughter Margaret Truman, and Ambassador Josephus Daniels.

She redecorated the mansion's official guest room, called the Rose Room, and an additional guest room. Cherry also chose new rugs and carpets for the second floor of the mansion but was unable to refurnish the first floor due to shortages of materials. During her tenure as first lady, David "Uncle Dave" Haywood, who served fourteen governors as butler, died.

Honorary titles
Preceded by Alice Willson Broughton	First Lady of North Carolina; 1945–1949	Succeeded by Mary White Scott
