= Martitia Daniel Worth =

First Lady of North Carolina (1865–1868)

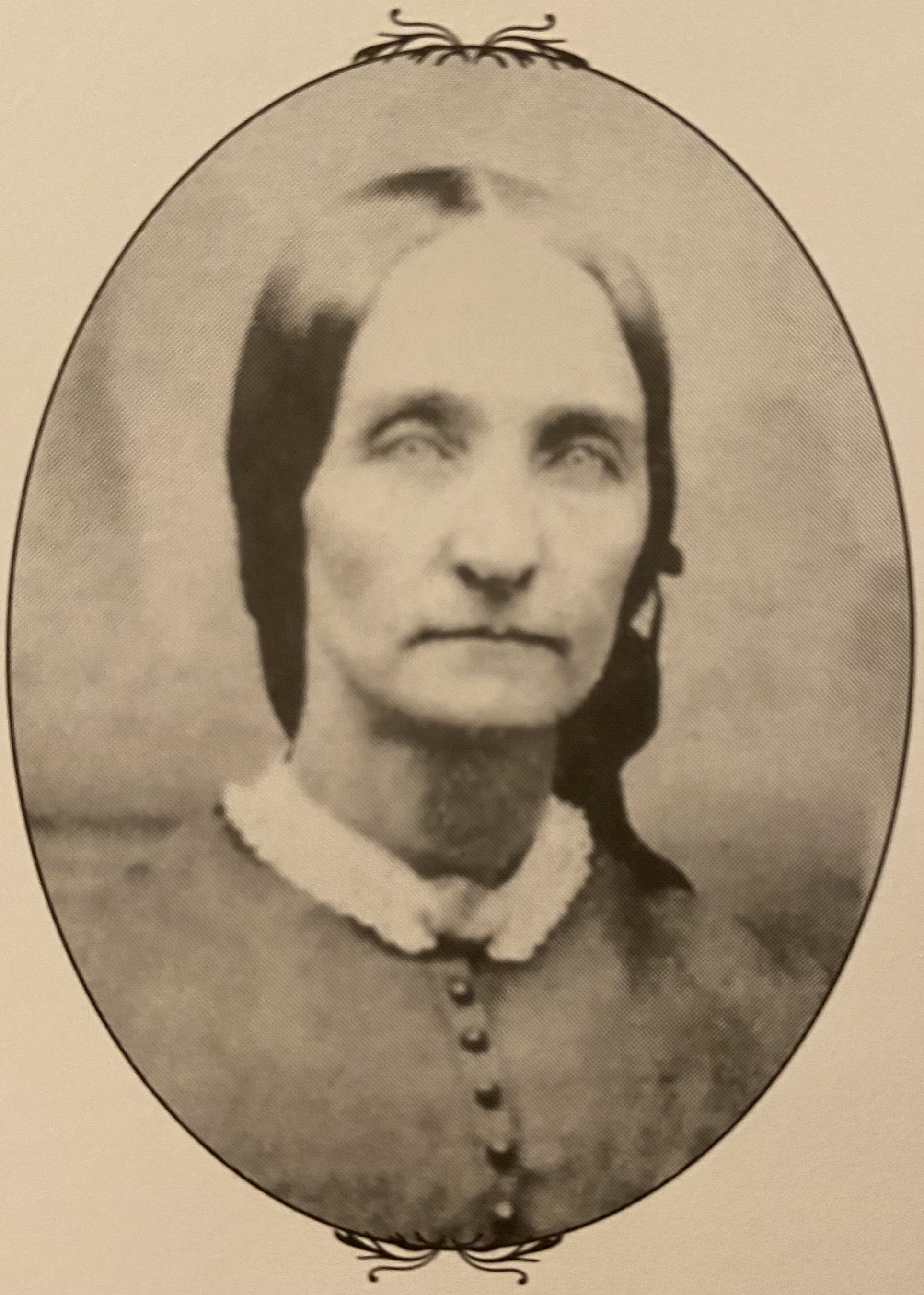

First Lady of North Carolina
- In office December 15, 1865 – July 1, 1868
- Governor: Jonathan Worth
- Preceded by: Louisa Virginia Harrison Holden
- Succeeded by: Louisa Virginia Harrison Holden

Personal details
- Born: October 20, 1806 Virginia, U.S.
- Died: May 4, 1874 (aged 67) Raleigh, North Carolina, U.S.
- Resting place: Historic Oakwood Cemetery
- Spouse: Jonathan Worth

Martitia Daniel Worth (October 20, 1806 – May 4, 1874) was an American political hostess who, as the wife of Governor Jonathan Worth, was First Lady of North Carolina from 1865 to 1868, during the Reconstruction era.

== Biography ==
Worth was born Martitia Daniel on October 20, 1806, in Virginia. She was a niece of the politician Archibald Murphey.

In 1824, she married the lawyer Jonathan Worth in a ceremony at her uncle's home. They had eight children: Roxana Cornelia, Lucy Jane, David Gaston, Eunice Louisa, Elvira Evelyna, Sarah Corinne, Adelaide Ann, and Mary Martitia. She was the grandmother of Addie Worth Bagley Daniels, David Worth Bagley, and Worth Bagley and the great-grandmother of Jonathan Worth Daniels.

From 1865 to 1868, during the Reconstruction era following the American Civil War, she served as the first lady of North Carolina.

She died in Raleigh on May 4, 1874, and was buried at Historic Oakwood Cemetery.
