= Alfred Dockery House =

Historic house in North Carolina, United States

- U.S. National Register of Historic Places
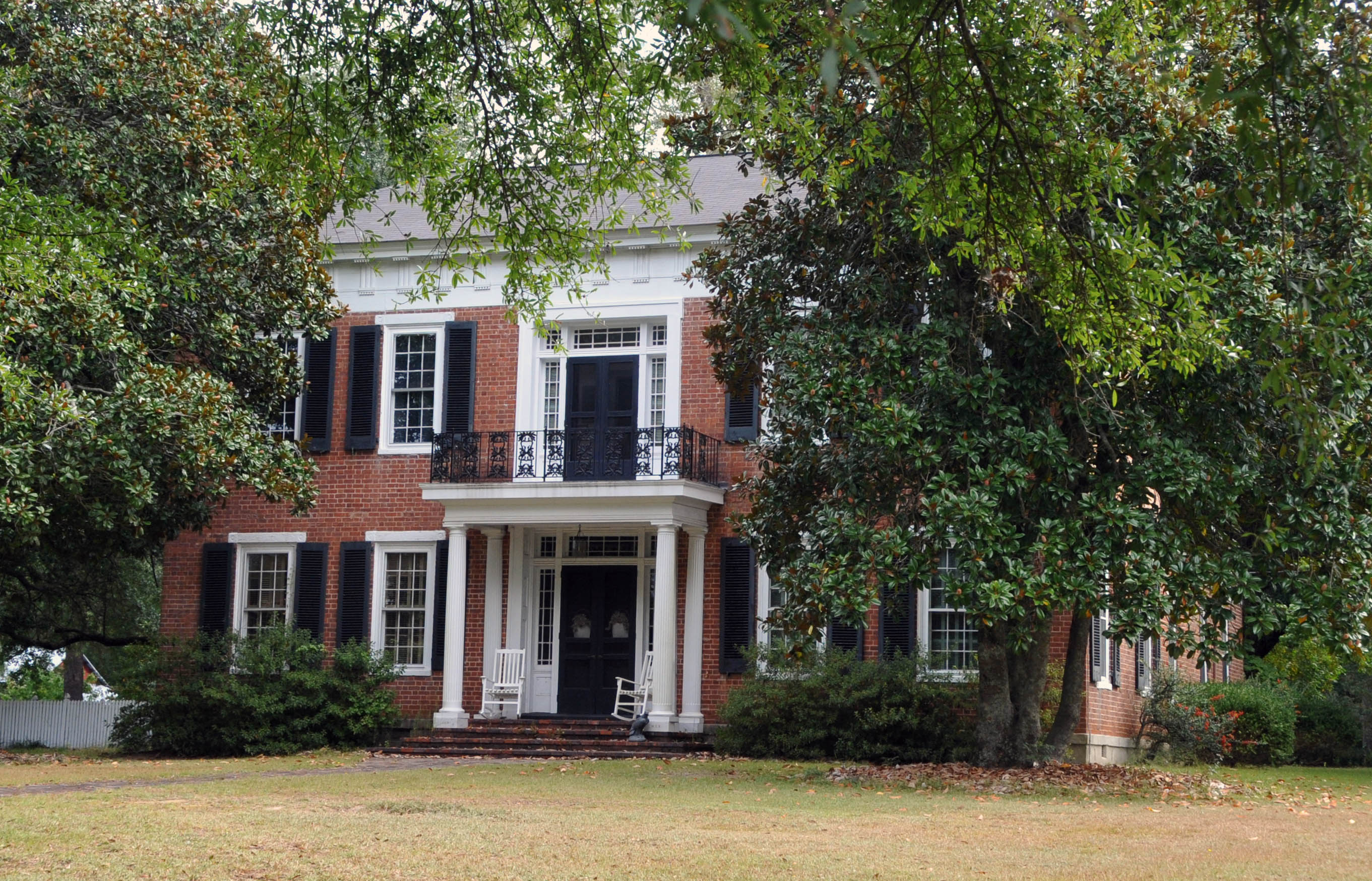
- Alfred Dockery House, March 2007

- Location within North Carolina Location within the United States
- Location: E side SR 1005, 0.1 mile S of jct. with SR 1143, near Rockingham, North Carolina
- Coordinates: 35°0′38″N 79°48′48″W
- Area: 130 acres (53 ha)
- Built: c. 1840, 1951
- Architectural style: Greek Revival
- NRHP reference No.: 86003350
- Added to NRHP: November 20, 1986

Alfred Dockery House is a historic plantation house located near Rockingham, Richmond County, North Carolina. It was built about 1840, and is a two-story, five-bay, brick dwelling with a low hipped roof in the Greek Revival style. The facade's brickwork is laid in Flemish bond. It rests on a brick foundation and has two ells. The house was restored in 1951. Also on the property are the contributing remains of an outbuilding and the remains of a water-powered mill. It was the home of Congressman and brigadier general of the Tennessee State Militia Alfred Dockery (1797-1875).

It was listed on the National Register of Historic Places in 1986.
