= Louisa Virginia Harrison Holden =

First Lady of North Carolina

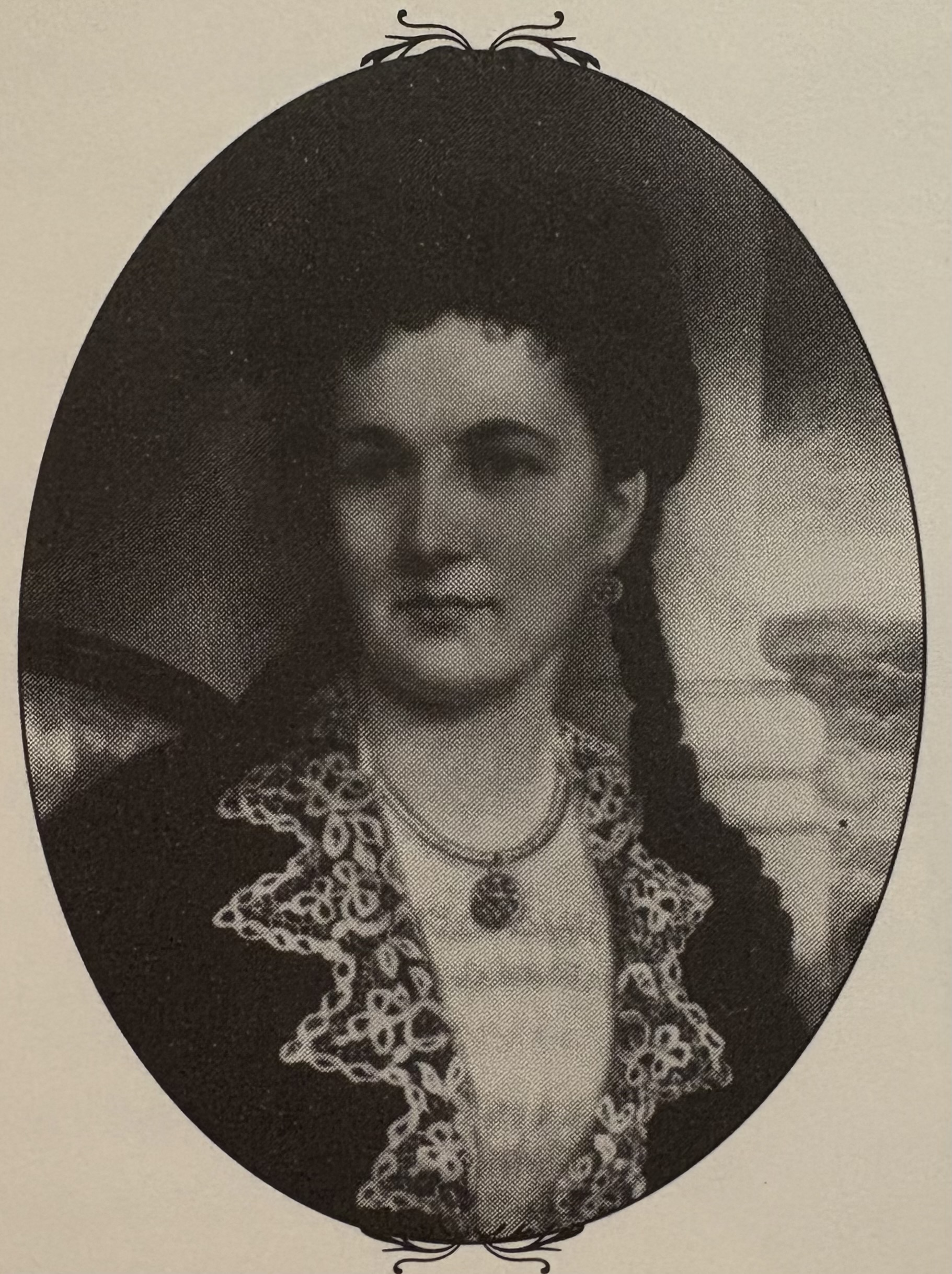

First Lady of North Carolina
- In office July 1, 1868 – March 22, 1871
- Governor: William Woods Holden
- Preceded by: Martitia Daniel Worth
- Succeeded by: Minerva Ruffin Cain Caldwell
- In office May 29, 1865 – December 15, 1865
- Governor: William Woods Holden
- Preceded by: vacant
- Succeeded by: Martitia Daniel Worth

Personal details
- Born: 1830
- Died: 1900 (aged 69–70) Wake County, North Carolina, U.S.
- Resting place: Historic Oakwood Cemetery
- Party: Republican
- Spouse: William Woods Holden
- Children: 3

Louisa Virginia Harrison Holden (1830–1900) was an American political hostess who, as the wife of Governor William Woods Holden, twice-served as First Lady of North Carolina from May 29, 1865, to December 15, 1865, and from July 1, 1868, to March 22, 1871. She and her husband were the state's first governor and first lady following the American Civil War.

== Biography ==
Holden was born Louisa Virginia Harrison in 1830. She was the daughter of Robert Harrison, a prominent and wealthy resident of Raleigh.

In 1854, she married former state senator William Woods Holden, with whom she had three children. She was Holden's second wife. She served as first lady of North Carolina during her husband's two separate terms as governor, in 1865 and again from 1868 to 1871.

Holden stood in place of her husband, who was incapacitated by poor health, in a lawsuit filed by newspaperman Josiah Turner. The suit, which carried on from 1885 into the 1890s, was filed after Holden's husband had Turner arrested for allegedly assisting the Ku Klux Klan. She won the suit in 1894, two years after her husband's death.

She died in Wake County in 1900. She was buried in Historic Oakwood Cemetery in Raleigh.
