= Edmund Deberry =

American politician (1787–1859)

Edmund DeBerry (August 14, 1787 – December 12, 1859) was a U.S. Congressman from North Carolina, from 1829 to 1831, from 1833 to 1845 and from 1849 to 1851.

Born in Lawrenceville, North Carolina in Montgomery County, DeBerry attended schools at High Shoals, then engaged in agricultural pursuits and also in the operation of cotton and flour mills.

He was a member of the North Carolina State Senate 1806–1811, 1813, 1814, 1820, 1821, and 1826–1828 and served as a justice of the peace. He was elected to the 21st United States Congress (March 4, 1829 – March 3, 1831) as an Anti-Jacksonian, was defeated for reelection in 1830. He ran again as a Whig in 1832 and served in the 23rd through the 28th Congresses (March 4, 1833 – March 3, 1845), becoming chairman of the Agriculture Committee. He did not run in 1844 but was elected to one final term in the 31st Congress (March 4, 1849 – March 3, 1851) after which he retired from politics.

DeBerry resumed his former agricultural and business pursuits and died at his home in Pee Dee Township, Montgomery County, North Carolina, in 1859. He is interred in the family cemetery on his plantation near Mount Gilead.

U.S. House of Representatives
| Preceded by John Culpepper | Member of the U.S. House of Representatives from North Carolina's 7th congressional district 1829–1831 | Succeeded by Lauchlin Bethune |
| Preceded by Lauchlin Bethune | Member of the U.S. House of Representatives from North Carolina's 7th congressional district 1833–1843 | Succeeded by John Daniel |
| Preceded by William H. Washington | Member of the U.S. House of Representatives from North Carolina's 4th congressional district 1843–1845 | Succeeded by Alfred Dockery |
| Preceded by Daniel M. Barringer | Member of the U.S. House of Representatives from North Carolina's 3rd congressional district 1849–1851 | Succeeded by Alfred Dockery |
