= Lauchlin Bethune =

American politician

Lauchlin Bethune (April 15, 1785 – October 10, 1874) was an American slave owner and U.S. Congressman from North Carolina between 1831 and 1833.

Born near Fayetteville, North Carolina in 1785, Bethune attended private schools and the Lumberton Male Academy. Elected to the North Carolina Senate in 1817, 1818, 1822 to 1825, and 1827, Bethune rose to the U.S. House in 1830 as a Jacksonian Democrat. Defeated for re-election in 1832, Bethune only served one term in Congress (March 4, 1831 – March 3, 1833). After losing two additional attempts to return to Congress in 1834 and 1836, Bethune returned to his slave plantation near Fayetteville and resumed the practice of agriculture; he owned thirty-eight slaves by the 1860 census.

He is buried in the Bethesda Presbyterian Church Cemetery in Aberdeen, North Carolina.

U.S. House of Representatives
Preceded by Edmund Deberry	Member of the U.S. House of Representatives from North Carolina's 7th congressional district 1831–1833	Succeeded by Edmund Deberry
