= Edenhouse Point =

Cape in North Carolina, United States

Coordinates: 36.0426599°N 76.7071684°W

Edenhouse Point is a cape on the Chowan River in the U.S. state of North Carolina. It is located at the southern end of the Chowan River Bridge, which intersects U.S. Highway 17.

Edenhouse Point is named after Charles Eden, the 2nd Governor of North Carolina, whose estate once stood nearby.
