= 1866 North Carolina gubernatorial election =

- October 18, 1866
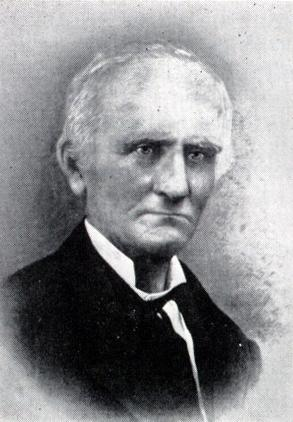

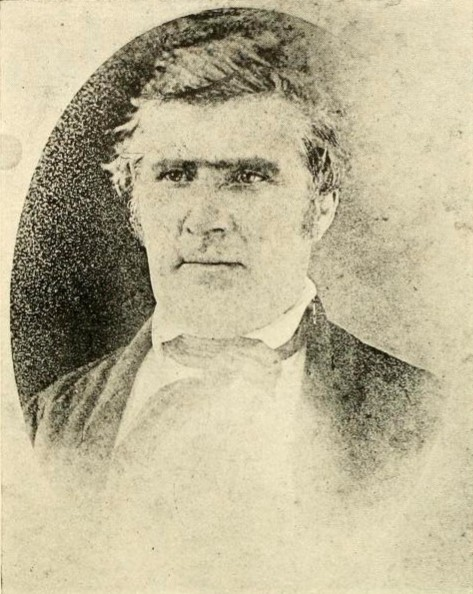
Nominee	Jonathan Worth	Alfred Dockery
Party	Nonpartisan	Nonpartisan
Popular vote	34,250	10,759
Percentage	75.87%	23.83%
- County results Worth: 50–60% 60–70% 70–80% 80–90% >90% Dockery: 50–60% 60–70% 70–80% No Data
Governor before election
Jonathan Worth
Nonpartisan
Elected Governor
Jonathan Worth
Nonpartisan

The 1866 North Carolina gubernatorial election was held on October 18, 1866. The incumbent governor Jonathan Worth defeated Alfred Dockery.

Worth had defeated the provisional governor and wartime unionist William Woods Holden at the previous election. During his term, he assembled a coalition of Conservative Unionists and former Confederates aligned with the Reconstruction policies of president Andrew Johnson that swept Holden's allies from power. Dockery was unofficially selected by Holden's remaining supporters to run for governor in 1866, but he did not seriously contest the election.

== General election ==
=== Results ===
1866 North Carolina gubernatorial election
Party	Candidate	Votes	%	±%
Nonpartisan	Jonathan Worth (incumbent)	34,250	76.10%	
Nonpartisan	Alfred Dockery	10,759	23.90%	
Total votes		45,009	100.00	
Nonpartisan hold		Swing		
