= Miles Gale =

English antiquary (1647–1721)

Miles Gale (1647–1721) was an English antiquary.

Gale was the eldest son of John Gale. His father, a descendant of the Gales of Scruton and Masham in Yorkshire, served under Count Mansfeld in the Low Countries (1622–5), returned to England, and lived in retirement on his estate at Farnley, near Leeds, refusing a commission from the parliament on the outbreak of the civil war. His mother was Joanna, daughter of Miles Dodson of Kirkby Overblow, Yorkshire.

Miles was born at Farnley Hall on 19 June 1647. He was educated at Trinity College, Cambridge, where he graduated B.A. in 1666 and M.A. in 1670. Having taken holy orders he was presented to the rectory of Keighley (1680), which he continued to hold until his death in the night of 2–3 January 1720–1. Gale was a friend of Henry Gyles, the eminent glass-painter of York, and was extremely interested in antiquarian research. He compiled and presented two manuscripts to Thoresby's Museum in Leeds:

1. Memoirs of the Family of Gale, particularly of the learned Dr. Thomas Gale, Dean of York, and Christopher Gale, Esq., Her Majesty's Attorney-general in North Carolina, 1703
2. A Description of the Parish of Keighley.

Miles married Margaret, daughter of Christopher Stones, D.D., chancellor of York (1660–87), by whom he had issue four sons and one daughter. His eldest son was Christopher, attorney-general of North Carolina in 1703, judge of the admiralty of North Carolina in 1712, and chief justice of Providence and the Bahama Islands in 1721.
