= Mary White Scott =

American teacher, farmer, and civic leader

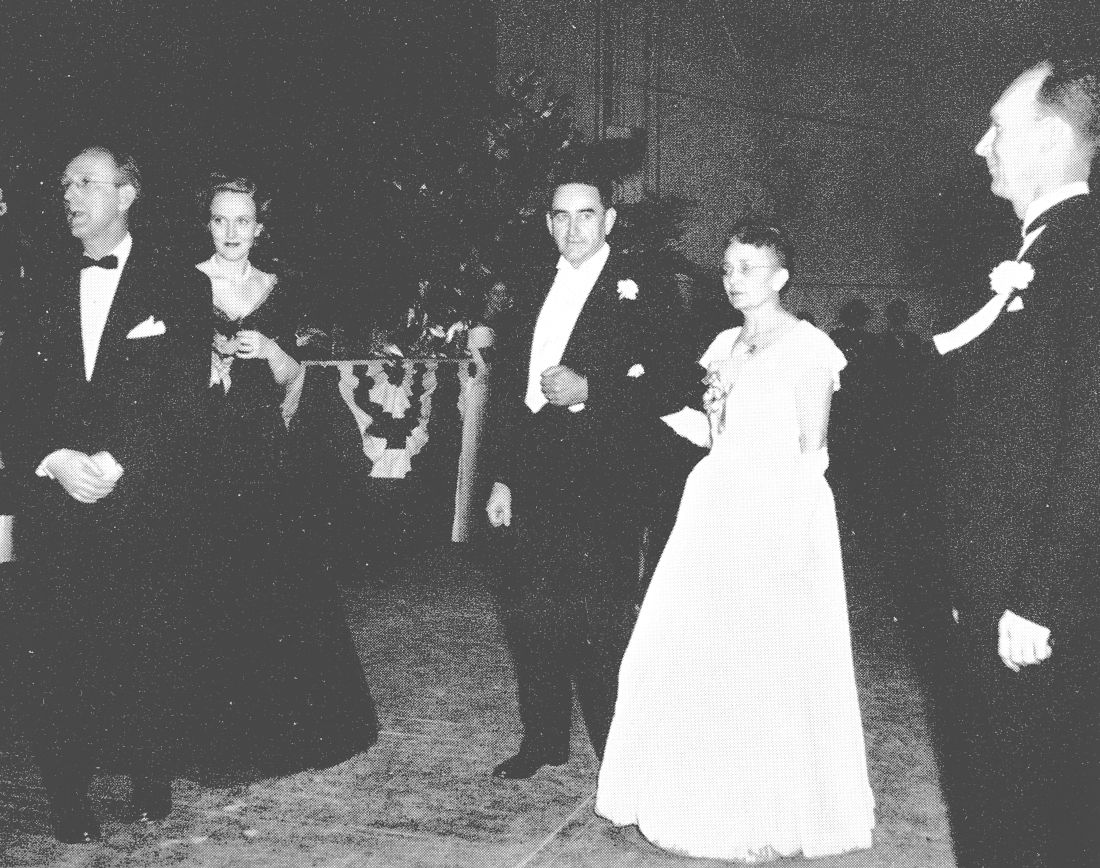
- Scott (in white) at the Inaugural Ball in 1949

First Lady of North Carolina
- In office January 6, 1949 – January 8, 1953
- Governor: W. Kerr Scott
- Preceded by: Mildred Stafford Cherry
- Succeeded by: Merle Davis Umstead

Personal details
- Born: Mary Elizabeth White; April 30, 1897 Haw River, North Carolina, U.S.
- Died: April 23, 1972 (aged 74) Duke Hospital, Durham, North Carolina, U.S.
- Resting place: Hawfields Presbyterian Church Cemetery; Hawfields, North Carolina
- Party: Democratic
- Spouse: W. Kerr Scott (m. 1919)
- Children: 3 (including Robert W. Scott)
- Parent(s): James Richard White; Elizabeth Ann Sellers White
- Education: State Normal and Industrial College
- Occupation: farmer, teacher

Mary Elizabeth White Scott (April 30, 1897 – April 23, 1972) was an American teacher, farmer, and civic leader. As the wife of Governor W. Kerr Scott, she served as the First Lady of North Carolina from 1949 to 1953. She was the mother of Robert W. Scott, who also served as North Carolina's governor. Scott was the second First Lady of North Carolina to be both a wife and mother of North Carolinina governors, after Elizabeth Montfort Ashe.

While her husband served in the United States Senate, she joined the Senate Ladies Group and assisted in the work of the American Red Cross. In 1961, she was appointed to the North Carolina Board of Health by Governor Terry Sanford, becoming the third woman to serve on the board. She was also appointed to the North Carolina Hospitals Board of Control.

== Early life and education ==
Scott was born Mary Elizabeth White on April 30, 1897, in Haw River, North Carolina to James Richard White and Elizabeth Ann Sellers White, who owned a farm in Haw River. She was one of seven children.

She grew up with her future husband, William Kerr Scott, attending school, church, and community activities together. The White farm was located near the Scott farm.

Scott attended the State Normal and Industrial College in Greensboro, where she took teacher training courses.

== Marriage ==
She married Scott on July 2, 1919, after he returned from serving in the United States Army during World War I. The wedding was held at Haw River Presbyterian Church and their wedding vows omitted the traditional language of wife "obeying" husband. She and her husband honeymooned at Wrightsville Beach and Myrtle Beach.

The couple established their farm on 225 acres that were given to them by her husband's parents, Robert W. Scott and Lizzie Scott. They lived in a three-room log house that they moved from the White family farm onto their new property. They later added four more rooms to their cabin.

The Scotts had three children: Osborne White Scott (born 1920), Mary Kerr Scott (born 1921), and Robert Walter Scott (born 1929). Her youngest son later served as Governor of North Carolina.

== Career ==
=== Education ===
Scott began teaching a year before she attended college, in order to earn money to pay for her tuition. Upon completing her teacher training courses at the State Normal and Industrial College, she taught at Woodlawn School in Alamance County. She also taught third to seventh grade at Pleasant Grove School in Alamance County, Anderson School in Caswell County and at a school in Taylorsville.

=== Farming ===
Scott was the bookkeeper and dairy manager on their farm, which eventually spanned 1,300 acres. She ran the farm while her husband served as the North Carolina Commissioner of Agriculture from 1937 to 1949. Along with managing the dairy and keeping up with the finances of the farm, she also repaired equipment and registered pure-bred cattle.

=== Public life and civic engagement ===
Scott was a charter member of the North Carolina 4-H Club, a youth organization. She worked to bring about rural electrification, modern health practices and medical care, and rural telephone services in her community. She was also a member of the Hawfield Home Demonstration Club.

While her husband was serving as the state's commissioner of agriculture, she accompanied him to regional and national meetings.

She became the First Lady of North Carolina upon her husband's election as Governor of North Carolina. She served as First Lady from 1949 to 1953. As official hostess of the North Carolina Executive Mansion, she hosted dinners and parties and often prepared the food herself. She employed Laura M. Reilley as a hostess and manager at the mansion to assist her in her duties and also managed a staff of seven prisoners who were assigned to the governor's residence. She hosted over 225,000 people at the mansion throughout her time as first lady.

Due to the Great Depression, World War I, and World War II, the Executive Mansion was in great need of renovations. After the North Carolina General Assembly approved a budget of $50,000 for mansion renovations, Scott hired a committee of architects from the State College's School of Design to update the kitchen, repair the leaking roof, and replace exterior woodwork on the house. Scott also oversaw the refurbishing of draperies, carpets, and furniture with the consultation of the interior decorator Anna Riddick.

After her husband's term as governor ended, he was elected as a member of the United States Senate. The Scotts moved into a suite at the Carroll Arms Hotel in Washington, D.C. She attended senate meetings, listening from the galleries to learn more about governance and national politics. Scott became active in the Senate Ladies Group, consisting of wives of U.S. senators, that prepared bandages for the American Red Cross and met to discuss various national issues.

While in Washington, D.C., Scott hosted constituents and even the elders and deacons of their North Carolina church in the U.S. Senate dining room. Her time in Washington ended when her husband died in 1958, at which time she returned to North Carolina.

Back in North Carolina, Scott was appointed to the North Carolina Board of Health and the North Carolina Hospitals Board of Control by Governor Terry Sanford in 1961, becoming the third woman to serve on the board of health.

Scott was named Woman of the Year by The Progressive Farmer in 1949 and by the State Grange of the Order of Patrons of Husbandry in 1951. In 1952, she received an award of merit from the American Red Cross and, in 1966, she was a recipient of the Distinguished Service Award of the National Arthritis and Rheumatism Foundation.

In 1970, she waws formally recognized by North Carolina State University for her lifetime contributions to the people of North Carolina. The Winston-Salem Journal wrote in 1972 that Scott's "spirit and energy made her exceptional at a time when the world of politics considered most women ornamental."

A dormitory at Western Carolina University was dedicated in her honor.

== Personal life ==
Scott was fond of knitting, crocheting, gardening, cooking, and reading. She often hosted friends, family members, and her husband's business associates for dinners at their farmhouse in Hawfields, North Carolina.

She was a Presbyterian and attended Hawfields Presbyterian Church.

== Death ==
Scott died of pneumonia at Duke Hospital on April 23, 1972. The North Carolina Secretary of State, Thad Eure, ordered that the state flag be flown at half-mast in Scott's honor. In her will, she left 62 acres of land to Hawfields Presbyterian Church to be used for building a nursing home and homeless shelter.

Honorary titles
Preceded by Mildred Stafford Cherry	First Lady of North Carolina; 1949–1953	Succeeded by Merle Davis Umstead
