= Cary's Rebellion =

18th century uprising in North Carolina

Cary's Rebellion, also known as the Cary Rebellion, was an uprising against the Deputy Governor of North-Carolina in 1711 led by Thomas Cary, who refused to give up his governorship to Edward Hyde. The rebellion was a part of a long-standing tension between religious and political groups in northern Carolina, generally divided between the Quaker party, of which Cary was a part, and the Church of England party, to which Hyde belonged.

== Background ==
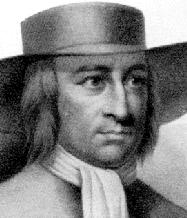
George Fox, founder of Quakerism

At the time, the Province of Carolina was technically a single entity which encompassed all the land from Spanish Florida to the Colony of Virginia. However, transportation between the northern parts and the southern seat of the provincial government in Charleston was very difficult. In the late 17th century, a deputy governor for the northern section was appointed who was able to act with significant autonomy.

Early in its history Carolina had provided for religious freedom, making it an attractive destination for Quakers who were persecuted in England and parts of the colonies. Quakerism's founder George Fox visited the Albemarle Settlements in the very northern part of Carolina in 1672. In the succeeding years, Quakerism grew in the area and came to dominate the government, including the appointment of Quaker John Archdale as Governor of Carolina in 1694. In 1699, Henderson Walker was appointed Deputy Governor of North Carolina. A devout Anglican, he pushed through reforms which established the Church of England as the official religion of the state and passing the Vestry Act which imposed a tax on residents, no matter their faith, to support the official church. During his tenure, Queen Anne assumed the throne, which required a renewal of the oaths by colonial officers. Quakers, as a tenet of their faith, do not swear oaths but had previously proven their loyalty by affirming it. This practice was disallowed and all Quakers lost their positions. Over the next decade the distinction between the Quaker party and the Church party grew more entrenched.

== Cary's Governorship ==
Thomas Cary was the stepson of the former Governor of Carolina and Quaker John Archdale. However, when he was first appointed Deputy Governor of North Carolina, he supported the Church party and continued to keep Quakers out of the government by strictly enforcing the oath requirement. The Quakers and some disaffected Anglicans sent a representative to the Lords Proprietors of Carolina in England who removed Cary from the governorship. After Cary returned to South Carolina, where he remained active in provincial politics, William Glover took over as Acting Deputy Governor, but continued the oath policy as before.

In 1707, Cary returned, this time supporting the Quaker dissenters against Glover and also espousing the regional interests of the town of Bath, on the Pamlico Sound against the Albemarle government which centered on the region near present-day Edenton. In 1708, Cary and his supporters had managed to oust Glover in an election in the Assembly; Glover then fled to Virginia and claimed Cary had threatened his life. Cary removed the oath requirement and restored Quakers to the government and so from 1708 to 1710, Cary and the Quakers dominated the government. Cary also lowered the quit-rents for Bath County, which were essentially a land tax charged in exchange for the royal land grants. Cary's government was not endorsed by the Lords Proprietors and so had no official legal standing.

== Rebellion ==
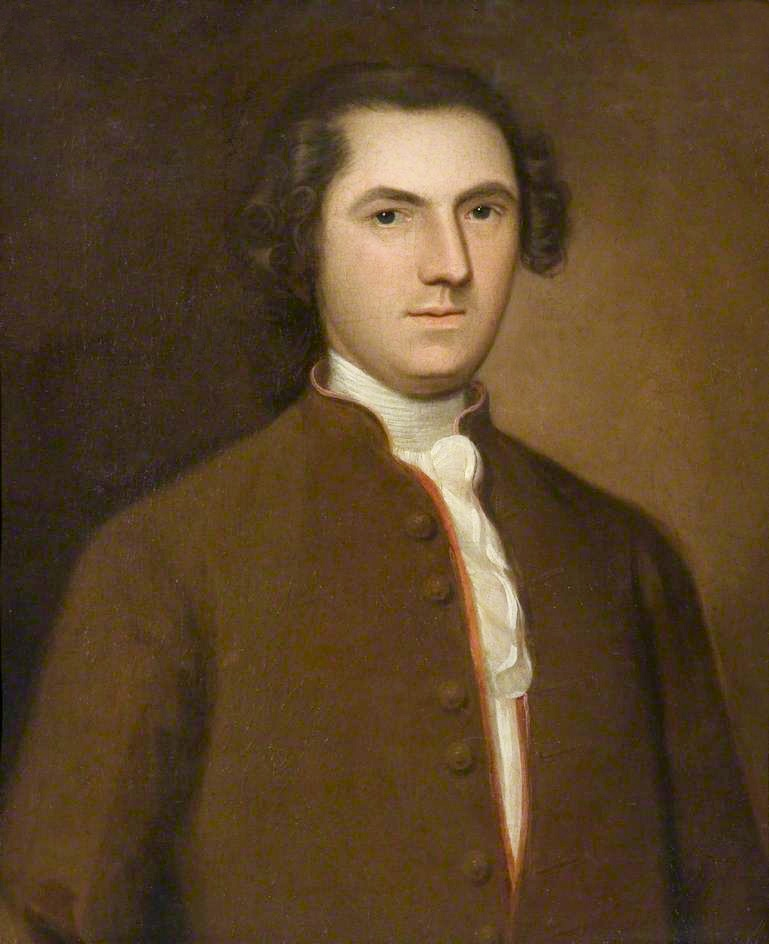
Edward Hyde, the first Governor of North Carolina (January–September 1712)

Though "Cary's Rebellion" can refer to the entire period from the ousting of Glover, it is generally used only for the period in 1711 after the Lords Proprietors chose Edward Hyde to take over the role of Deputy Governor and his appointment was resisted by Cary. Hyde arrived in North Carolina in January 1711. He brought with him letters from the Lords Proprietors and was supposed to receive his full, official commission from the Governor of Carolina when he arrived. However, the governor had died by the time he arrived, and so his claim to the Deputy Governorship was not technically perfected. Despite this, Cary and the Quaker party were at first willing to allow Hyde to take over, until Hyde began to clearly side with the Anglican party. Then Cary refused to recognize Hyde until he produced his official commission and claimed that he was still the legal governor.

Hyde declared Cary to be in open rebellion and assembled an armed force of around 150 men to go to Bath to arrest him. Cary fled from his home to a nearby plantation (possibly that of former governor Robert Daniell) which had been fortified and armed with cannons and several dozen of Cary's supporters. On May 29, after failing to reach an agreement with Cary, Hyde decided to attack this fortified position and he and his men were beaten back after a short battle. On June 30, 1711, Cary—with his armed brigantine—began an attack on Hyde and his council at the home of Colonel Thomas Pollock on the Chowan River. The followers of Hyde had only 60 men under arms and two cannon, and affairs looked dark for them when two strong landing parties from the brigantine headed for shore. At this moment, however, a lucky shot from one of the two cannon on shore severed the brigantine's mast and so frightened Cary's forces that they cut their anchor and sailed away. Cary regrouped and fortified a small island in the Pamlico Sound and began to rearm his followers. They then sailed to mainland Carolina and met Hyde's force face to face. A fierce battle broke out. Little is known about the battle. Quakers themselves are generally pacifists so it is unlikely that many Quakers took part in the violence themselves but rather that Cary's force was made up of Bath County men and non-Quaker dissenters.

Governor Alexander Spottswood of Virginia had decided to come to the aid of Hyde and began organizing a militia and dispatched a contingent of Royal Marines who had been stationed on the Chesapeake in mid-July. With the arrival of an organized military force, who represented the official power of the crown, Cary's forces disbanded and Cary himself fled. He was arrested and sent to England for trial though he was released after a year and returned to live out his life in Bath without further incident.

== Aftermath ==
During the period from 1708 to 1711, the disputed government severely weakened the position of the colonists in North Carolina. The Tuscarora War began in September 1711 and the chaos and dissension that the Cary Rebellion had wrought impeded the colonial response, though a drought and yellow fever epidemic also played a role. The Cary rebellion also represented the end of the role of Quakers in North Carolina governance. After the rebellion they were effectively excluded from politics.
