= Governor Reid =

Governor Reid may refer to:

- David Settle Reid (1813–1891), 32nd Governor of North Carolina
- Lestock Robert Reid (1799–1878), Governor of Bombay from 1846 to 1847
- Robert R. Reid (1789–1841), Territorial Governor of Florida from 1839 to 1841
- William Reid (British Army officer) (1791–1858), Governor of the Bermudas from 1839 to 1846, of the British Windward Islands from 1846 to 1848, and of Malta from 1851 to 1858

== See also ==
- Governor Reed (disambiguation)
