= Hawfields Presbyterian Church =

Historic church in North Carolina, United States

- U.S. National Register of Historic Places
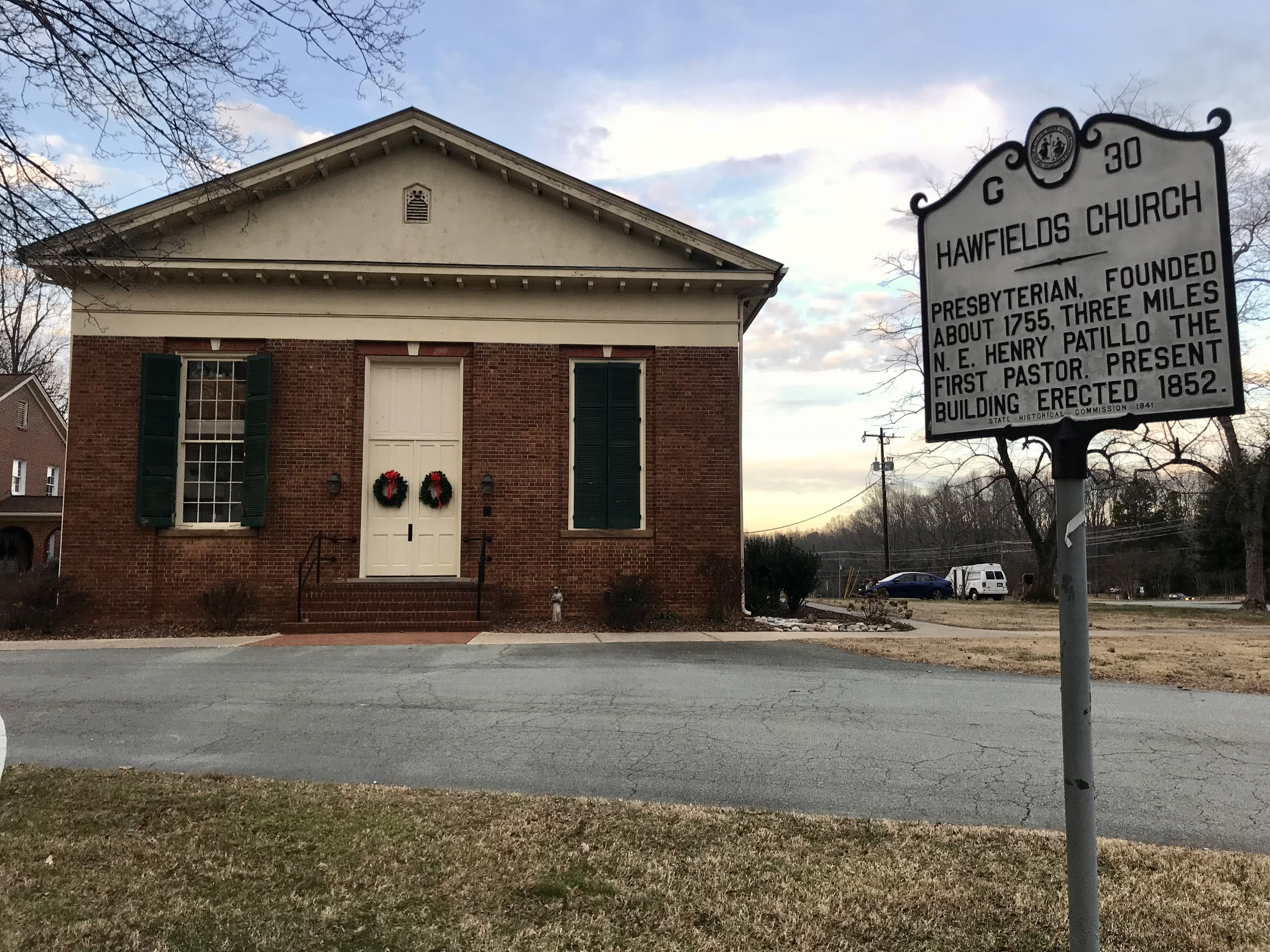

- Location within North Carolina Location within the United States
- Location: SW of Mebane on NC 119, near Mebane, North Carolina
- Coordinates: 36°3′28″N 79°18′23″W
- Area: 9 acres (3.6 ha)
- Built: 1852-1855
- Architectural style: Greek Revival, Vernacular Greek Revival
- NRHP reference No.: 78001926
- Added to NRHP: December 15, 1978

Hawfields Presbyterian Church is a historic Presbyterian church complex located near Mebane, Alamance County, North Carolina. The congregation was established by settlers in the 1700s. The complex consists of the original church building, the classroom to the rear of it, the Session House, and the cemetery. The current Greek Revival-style Flemish bond brick church building was constructed between 1852 and 1855.

It was added to the National Register of Historic Places in 1978.

In the cemetery "a plaque...hangs 'in memory of the faithful slaves' who once worshipped there and are buried nearby."

David Ealy has served as the church's pastor since October, 2010.
