= William Glover (North Carolina politician) =

Deputy Governor of North Carolina Acting
- In office 1706–1708
- Preceded by: Thomas Cary
- Succeeded by: Thomas Cary

Personal details
- Born: 1653; Farham (present day Rappahannock County), Virginia
- Died: 1713; Henrico County, Virginia
- Spouse(s): Mary Ann Burton (m. 1684); Catalina Atwood (m. 1705)
- Children: 6
- Occupation: Lawyer

William Glover (1653–1713) was the Acting Deputy Governor of North Carolina from 1706 to 1708.

== Biography ==
William Glover was born in Farham (in modern Rappahannock, Virginia) in or around 1653. His father was Richard Glover and his mother Mary Maria (Broeck) Booker.

Glover practiced law for many years before entering government work, where he served as a clerk of court and as secretary to the Crown. Between 1700 and 1712 he was part of the Executive Council, serving either as a member or as chairman. During this time at the council, certain people became hostile towards him.

Between 1706 and 1707, while Thomas Cary was in South Carolina, Glover governed North Carolina in his place. In October of that year, John Porter, who was responsible for formally dismissing Thomas Cary, elected new members of the council. Glover who had been acting as governor, was formally elected to the position. However Cary and Glover were never able to resolve their problems.

Glover believed that Quakers should not be able to hold office, so he advocated for the swearing of an oath for every government position. This prevented Quakers from taking up any government position because their religion prevented them from swearing oaths.

However, in the summer of 1708, Porter called a meeting of councilors, both those who held that job at the time & those who had done it before, and declared the election of Glover as illegal. Porter decided to support Cary after Glover attempted to prevent Quakers from attaining public office. This resulted in Cary/Glover both trying to occupy governmental power, causing turmoil in North Carolina. In October 1708, they tried to resolve their conflict in the assembly. However, Cary's supporters controlled the assembly and elected Cary as governor. Glover then moved to Virginia alleging that Cary wanted to kill him.

Glover served as a trustee between 1711 and 1712 under Governor Edward Hyde, who supported Cary. Taking advantage of continuing tensions among Anglicans (supported by Glover) & dissidents (supported by Cary), Cary's Rebellion against Glover was waged. He died in 1713 at the age of 60.

== Personal life ==
Glover married Mary Ann Burton on 22 October 1684 in Farham, Virginia. They had 5 children: Dorothy, Thomas, Charlesworth, Joseph and William Glover. He later remarried to Catherine Atwood on 7 October 1705 in Virginia, with whom he had one daughter, Elizabeth Glover.
