= Thomas Pollock (governor) =

Acting governor of the North Carolina

His Excellency Thomas Pollock

Governor of North Carolina Acting
- In office 30 March 1722 – 30 August 1722
- Monarch: George II
- Preceded by: Charles Eden
- Succeeded by: William Reed (acting)
- In office 12 September 1712 – 28 May 1714
- Monarch: Anne
- Preceded by: Edward Hyde
- Succeeded by: Charles Eden

Personal details
- Born: May 6, 1654 Glasgow, Scotland
- Died: August 30, 1722 (aged 68) North Carolina
- Resting place: St. Paul's Church, Edenton; 36°03′40.6″N 76°36′31.8″W
- Spouse: Esther Wilkinson

Thomas Pollock (1654–1722) was a Scottish planter and lawyer who served as the acting governor of North Carolina from 1712 to 1714 and 1722.

== Biography ==
Thomas Pollock was born on 6 May 1654 in Glasgow, Scotland, to Thomas Pollock of Balgra. He moved to the newly formed Carolina in 1683, as the deputy of Lord Proprietor Peter Carteret. He was a member of the Provincial Council.

In addition to practicing law, Pollock was a merchant and also carried on extensive planting operations. He eventually enslaved about one hundred people, and from the time of his arrival in the colony to his death he accumulated large tracts of land along the Chowan, Roanoke, and Trent rivers. One of his plantations in Bertie County included 40,000 acres. He also owned two lots in Bath and New Bern. The town of New Bern was rebuilt largely under his leadership after the Tuscarora Indian war (1711–15).

Government offices
Preceded by Edward Hyde	Governor of North Carolina; Acting; 1712–1714	Succeeded by Charles Eden
Preceded by Charles Eden	Governor of North Carolina; Acting; 1722	Succeeded by William Reed; Acting
