= Nathaniel Rice =

British colonial administrator

His Excellency Nathaniel Rice

Governor of North Carolina Acting
- In office 17 July 1752 – 28 January 1753
- Monarch: George II
- Preceded by: Gabriel Johnston
- Succeeded by: Matthew Rowan (acting)
- In office April 17, 1734 – November 2, 1734
- Monarch: George II
- Preceded by: George Burrington
- Succeeded by: Gabriel Johnston

Personal details
- Born: 1684
- Died: 1753 (aged 68–69)
- Spouse(s): Anne Gibbs; Mary Bursey

Nathaniel Rice (c. 1684-1753) was a British colonial administrator who served as the acting governor of North Carolina in 1734 and from 1752 to 1753.

== Early life and career ==
In 1724, Rice joined the Royal African Company (RAC) and was appointed as the factor for the Cape Coast Castle (a trading post of the RAC) as part of a three-man team headed by Captain-General John Tinker to administer the post's trade in gold, silver and slaves. Rice returned to England in 1726 to marry Anne Gibbs, sister-in-law of politician Martin Bladen, a senior figure at the Board of Trade.

In 1730 Nathaniel Rice was appointed Secretary of the North Carolina Council, a posting he assumed in April 1731 at the beginning of George Burrington's second term as governor. Burrington's first term as governor in 1724-25 had been marked by aggressive behaviour and quarrelling with his senior councillor who, along with other assembly members had complained to London and got him removed from post. Despite this, he secured a second term as governor through the patronage of the Duke of Newcastle and, during preparations to issue him instructions, Burrington had been asked to produce a list of 12 names to be his councillors but, when he only presented a list of 10, Martin Bladen inserted the names of William Smith (a London lawyer) and Nathaniel Rice (who was now Bladen's brother-in-law). Bladen had a particular interest in North Carolina, his father-in-law John Gibbs having been governor 1689-90 and he also owned land there; Bladen was hostile to the re-appointment of Burrington and Burrington was hostile to the idea that Bladen's brother-in-law was now his senior councillor.

== Acting governor of North Carolina ==
Within a few months of Governor George Burrington being in post, most members of his administration and council complained of his behaviour and William Smith, the Chief Justice, resigned in protest and left for England to complain about the governor to Whitehall officials at the Board of Trade. In Smith's absence, Nathaniel Rice was appointed President of the Council towards the end of 1731. By the following year Rice, the Attorney General and other members of the Council complained about the Governor's behaviour to the Duke of Newcastle. The complaints continued to flow in until finally Newcastle, in 1733, announced that Burrington would be replaced by a new governor - who did not arrive in post until the following year. Burrington had to remain in post for many months until his replacement arrived and when Smith returned from England to an enthusiastic reception from the Council, Burrington felt threatened. He removed the seals of office from Nathaniel Rice to prevent him carrying out his duties and then dissolved the council. Meanwhile, on 15 April 1734, when Burrington was in South Carolina, Nathaniel Rice - as next senior councillor - assumed the governorship in his absence. When the governor returned on 17 September 1734 he immediately suspended Rice from office, along with other councillors and alleged that Rice, Smith and Montgomery had attempted to assassinate him. By the end of September, however, Governor Burrington himself had been removed from office again, and a new governor, Gabriel Johnston, had arrived to take charge who immediately reinstated all those councillors Burrington had suspended. Nathaniel Rice worked alongside Governor Johnston throughout his term. Rice was appointed a Commissioner of the Peace of New Hanover Precinct, a member of the General Court and Member of a Board of Commissioners to erect Fort Johnston. Burrington aside, Rice prospered in America where he probably had land acquisitions prior to his arriving in 1731 from his 1725 visit to South Carolina and he had a plantation on the south side of Old Town Creek in New Hanover County (most of the land owned by Nathaniel Rice later fell into newly formed Brunswick County, North Carolina), called 'Rice's Plantation'. Numerous land grants indicate he amassed some 6,000 acres of land and 17 slaves. He was a vestryman at St Philip's Parish Church and was buried in the family vault near his home on 29 January 1753, Wilmington, North Carolina.

== Personal life ==
Rice married at least twice: On 24 August 1726 he married Anne Gibbs at St Clement Danes Church in London and later married Mary Bursey, his last wife who survived him. He had one surviving son, John Rice, who was appointed Deputy Secretary of the province and also served as Clerk of Craven County, North Carolina. He may have had a second son Martin Rice, born 1729 in Salehurst Sussex, who probably died young. By his son John Rice, he had several grandchildren including grandson, John Rice, who married Abigail Sugg in 1773, was the first Clerk of Wake County, North Carolina, and a member of the North Carolina House of Commons for Wake County in 1777. Granddaughter, Sarah Rice, married John Hawks, architect of Tryon Palace in New Bern, North Carolina.

Government offices
| Preceded by George Burrington | Governor of North Carolina; Acting; 1734 | Succeeded by Gabriel Johnston |
| Preceded by Gabriel Johnston | Governor of North Carolina; Acting; 1752–1753 | Succeeded by Matthew Rowan; Acting |
