= Matthew Rowan =

British colonial official

His Excellency Matthew Rowan

Governor of North Carolina Acting
- In office 1 February 1753 – 1 November 1754
- Monarch: George II
- Preceded by: Nathaniel Rice (acting)
- Succeeded by: Arthur Dobbs

Personal details
- Born: County Antrim, Ireland
- Died: April 1760

Matthew Rowan (died April 1760) was a British colonial official who was the acting governor of North Carolina from 1753 to 1754.

== Early life, family and education ==
Matthew Rowan was born in County Antrim, Ireland, but the date of his birth remains unknown. He was the son of Reverend John Rowan and the former Margaret Stewart and had eight brothers and three sisters.

== Career ==
Although it is not known when Rowan emigrated to North Carolina, it is recorded that he lived in Bath in 1726, serving as a church warden. In addition, he was a merchant and shipbuilder in the colony. An affidavit of about 1729 notes that Rowan was sent to the colony to build one or two ships for some persons in Dublin and that he "is now run away with one of them loaded with enumerated goods contrary to the Acts of Trade." Rowan joined the assembly in 1727 and the executive council in 1731, where he worked between 1734 and his death in 1760. In 1735, Rowan worked in the survey of the boundary line between North and South Carolina with other men, being appointed surveyor-general of North Carolina.

He was appointed President of the Council and acting governor of North Carolina in 1753, following the death of governor Nathaniel Rice. He held this post for one year until the arrival of Governor Arthur Dobbs at New Bern in 1754. After that, Rowan retired to his plantation in Brunswick County, although he continued to serve as member of the Council. Rowan died in April 1760. He is buried on the Brunswick County plantation.

== Wreck of the Martha & Eliza ==
Purportedly, Rowan was the captain of an unregistered 90-foot (27 m) two-masted ship the Martha & Eliza which was wrecked on Grand Manon Island in the Bay of Fundy in 1741, carrying Presbyterian Irish expatriates. He abandoned the survivors but later returned to recover the cargo from the wrecked ship. A complaint in the Massachusetts archives states that, “At the time the sloop and schooner came for us, the hands aboard — our mate and others — for reasons best known to themselves, were quite unwilling to land or search for these, though we had seen them that very day on the shore searching for food and eating rockweed, and so left them. Of these we can give no further account.”

The survivors asked for help: “Now, besides these already mentioned that came first aboard the vessel at Londonderry, there is but 48 of us know. In brief, many died at sea and many after we came to land, the corps [corpses]of which lie many of them on the shore, through weakness we were not able to interr them.” The rescue vessel took 48 people to Pleasant Point in Cushing, and Captain Rowan and his henchmen stripped survivors of whatever money and possessions they still had, as payment for their rescue. The complaint continues saying that even some of their clothes were taken, “to leave us almost naked.”

But the Cushing residents, many of whom had come from Northern Ireland themselves, were warm and generous to the new arrivals. It being winter, however, they couldn’t support 48 newcomers for long, so they sent an appeal to provincial officials, signed by Alexander Campbell and William Lunnen. The letter clearly informed them of Rowan’s abuses, and the Massachusetts House of Representatives wasted no time in authorizing provisions for the survivors. A treasurer for Massachusetts Bay Colony reported 250 pounds spent for “sundry provisions sent in the County Sloop to the poor sufferers that were cast ashore at St. George.” While Massachusetts Bay Colony records indicate provisions were sent to the town of Cushing, no accounting of them being received and distributed has been found.

== Personal life and demise ==
Rowan married Elizabeth, the widow of his brother John, in 1742, although they had no children (while she had four daughters). Rowan fathered one child, John Rowan, with Jane Stubbs; he acknowledged his paternity and remembered John in his will. Rowan mainly lived in the Lower Cape Fear, near the Brunswick County community (modern Northwest), where he lived in North Carolina.

== Legacy ==
In 1753, the area that had previously been the northern part of Anson County was formed into Rowan County, named in his honor.

Government offices
Preceded by Nathaniel Rice; Acting	Governor of North Carolina; Acting; 1753–1754	Succeeded by Arthur Dobbs
