= Arthur Dobbs =

British politician and colonial administrator

His Excellency Arthur Dobbs
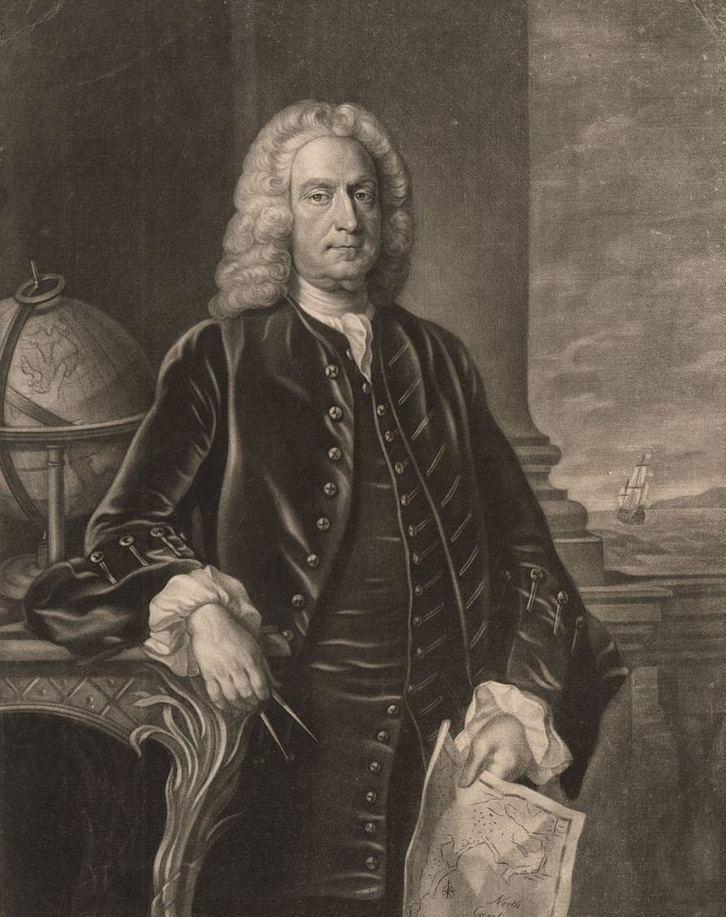
- Mezzotint by James MacArdell, c. 1753; after a William Hoare portrait

Governor of North Carolina
- In office November 1, 1754 – October 27, 1764
- Monarchs: George II; George III
- Preceded by: Matthew Rowan (acting)
- Succeeded by: William Tryon

Personal details
- Born: April 2, 1689 Girvan, Ayrshire
- Died: March 28, 1765 (aged 75) Brunswick Town, North Carolina
- Resting place: St. Philip's Church, Brunswick Town; 34°02′28.6″N 77°56′48.0″W
- Spouse: Anne Dobbs
- Children: 4

Military service
- Allegiance: Great Britain
- Branch: British Army
- Years of service: 1711–1712
- Rank: Cornet
- Unit: Echlin's Dragoons

Arthur Dobbs (2 April 1689 – 28 March 1765) was a British politician and colonial administrator who served as the governor of North Carolina from 1754 to 1764.

== Early life and career ==
Arthur Dobbs was born in Girvan, Ayrshire, where his mother had been sent because of political and religious unrest. He was the eldest son of Richard Dobbs of County Antrim, Ireland, who was soon to become Sheriff of Antrim in 1694 and Mary Stewart from Ballintoy. The first English ancestor to settle in County Antrim was John Dobbs (his great-great-grandfather), an officer who had arrived in 1596 with Sir Henry Dockwra. In 1599 John Dobbs built a home known as Castle Dobbs. He married Margaret Dalway and had two sons.

Dobbs was a neighbour and family friend of Jonathan Swift despite their political differences. He served briefly in a dragoon regiment in the British Army, and afterward managed his family estate. He was appointed Engineer-in-Chief and Surveyor-General in Ireland by Sir Robert Walpole, supervising the construction of the Irish Parliament House in Dublin, as well as other Irish public buildings. He was appointed High Sheriff of Antrim in 1720, and in 1727, was elected Member of Parliament for Carrickfergus, a seat he held until 1760.

In 1731, he was one of fourteen men to found the Dublin Society (later the Royal Dublin Society).

Whilst a member of the Irish Parliament, Dobbs purchased 400,000 acres (1,600 km^{2}) in North Carolina in 1745 and encouraged settlement in the colony, especially by Scots Irish. Following the death of North Carolina governor Gabriel Johnston, Dobbs was confirmed to succeed him on 25 January 1753. However, he did not arrive to assume his duties until October of the following year.

== Governor of North Carolina ==
While governor of North Carolina, Dobbs sought unsuccessfully to establish a permanent capital, to be called George City, near Tower Hill and the Neuse River. Plans were drawn up for a Palladian governor's mansion similar to Tryon Palace, which Dobbs's successor, William Tryon, would erect 10 years later in New Bern. Dobbs's governorship was overshadowed by the French and Indian War and the start of the American Revolution. Shortly after his arrival, he visited the western frontiers of North Carolina, organized the construction of Fort Dobbs, and attempted to raise troops to fight in the French and Indian War. He moved to Brunswick Town in 1758 where he lived for the rest of his life. In 1759, and 1760, the governor and Assembly were often at odds. Debt, Indian affairs, public complaints about Lord Granville's agents and about Dobbs's failure to put down riots in Edgecombe County and elsewhere, and Dobbs's frequent vetoes of Assembly bills led to intense tensions. Dobbs even dissolved the Assembly in 1760 and ordered new elections, but this plan backfired; a secret committee drew up outlandish charges against the governor to be sent to the King. Only the succession of King George III, which brought additional powers to Dobbs, saved him from further conflict with the Assembly.

== Personal life ==
Dobbs had married in 1720 Anne, daughter and heir of Captain John Osborne of Timahoe, Ireland, and the widow of Captain Norbury. They had three sons and a daughter. In 1762, Dobbs, then seventy-three, married fifteen-year-old Justina Davis at St. Philip's Church, Brunswick Town. A few months later he had a stroke and was reliant on a wheelchair. In the fall of 1763 he attended a conference of Southern governors and Indian tribes in Augusta, Georgia, which resulted in the Treaty of Augusta. In 1764 he look a leave of absence to return to England, and Tryon arrived as lieutenant-governor to fill his place. Dobbs later decided to retire and return to Ireland, but while packing, had a fatal seizure on 28 March 1765, just two weeks before he was to depart. He was buried at St. Philip's Church, where no sign of his grave remains.

== Legacy ==
Coat of Arms of Arthur Dobbs

=== Discovery of the Venus flytrap ===
In 1759, Dobbs, recorded the first written description of the plant which would later be named the Venus Flytrap. "We have a kind of Catch Fly Sensitive which closes upon anything that touches it. It grows in Latitude 34 but not in 35. I will try to save the seed here." In a letter he wrote to botanist Peter Collinson, Dobbs went into greater detail about the plant dated Brunswick, 24 January 1760.

"The great wonder of the vegetable kingdom is a very curious unknown species of Sensitive. It is a dwarf plant. The leaves are like a narrow segment of a sphere, consisting of two parts, like the cap of a spring purse, the concave part outwards, each of which falls back with indented edges (like an iron spring fox-trap); upon anything touching the leaves, or falling between them, they instantly close like a spring trap, and confine any insect or anything that falls between them. It bears a white flower. To this surprising plant I have given the name of Fly-trap Sensitive."

— Arthur Dobbs

This seems to be the earliest notice of the plant and is before the letters from John Ellis (who gave it the name Dionæa muscipula) to The St James's Chronicle, a London newspaper and Carl Linnaeus on the subject.

=== Northwest Passage ===
Apart from his North Carolina interests, Dobbs was heavily involved in attempts to find a Northwest Passage in the Canadian Arctic during the 1740s. He actively worked to have the Hudson's Bay Company's trade monopoly revoked on the grounds that they showed little or no interest in promoting discovery expeditions relating to the Northwest Passage. Dobbs felt that others might finance exploration if they had some expectation of trade. Revoking the Hudson's Bay Company's trade monopoly was his solution for stimulating exploration. From 1741 to 1747, Dobbs managed to stimulate exploration, the result of which convinced most people that such a passage did not exist. A British Parliamentary inquiry in 1749 ended attempts to revoke the Hudson's Bay Company's charter. Dobbs's involvement in the Canadian Arctic exploration resulted in a substantial increase in geographical knowledge as well as increased awareness of the economic potential. Dobbs was also an amateur scientist and published several astronomy articles as well as a pamphlet on honeybees.

== See also ==
- List of Irish MPs 1727–1760

Parliament of Ireland
Preceded by Edward Lyndon; Archibald Edmonstone	Member of Parliament for Carrickfergus; 1727–1760; With: John Lyndon 1727–1741; Francis Clements 1741; Arthur Upton 1741–1760	Succeeded by Marriot Dalway; Arthur Upton
Government offices
Preceded by Edward Pearce	Surveyor General of Ireland; 1733–1743	Succeeded by Arthur Jones-Nevill
Preceded by Matthew Rowan; Acting	Governor of North Carolina; 1754–1764	Succeeded by William Tryon
