= Charles Eden (politician) =

British Governor of North Carolina (1673–1722)

His Excellency Charles Eden

2nd Governor of North Carolina
- In office 28 May 1714 – 26 March 1722
- Monarchs: Anne; George I
- Preceded by: Thomas Pollock (acting)
- Succeeded by: Thomas Pollock (acting)

Personal details
- Born: 1673 County Palatine of Durham, England
- Died: 26 March 1722 (aged 48) Bertie County, North Carolina
- Resting place: St. Paul's Church, Edenton; 36°03′40.6″N 76°36′31.8″W
- Spouse: Penelope Golland

Charles Eden (1673 – 26 March 1722) was a British colonial official who served as the second Governor of North Carolina from 1714 until his death in 1722.

== Governor of North Carolina ==
Coat of Arms of Charles Eden

Eden was appointed governor of North Carolina on 28 May 1714. He is best known for his connections with various locally based pirates. Gentleman pirate Stede Bonnet and the notorious Blackbeard (Edward Teach) surrendered to Governor Eden and received the King's Pardon upon promising to change their ways. Both, however, would eventually return to piracy.

In 1719 prominent North Carolinian Edward Moseley accused Governor Eden of profiting from Blackbeard's crimes. Moseley was arrested and fined for his accusations. Eden's secretary of the governor's council, Tobias Knight, was implicated when a letter written to Teach was found on the pirate's body at his death and by the fact that the cargo taken from a ship captured by Teach was housed in Knight's barn. Knight's letter mentioned the governor's desire to meet with Blackbeard and this was considered sufficient evidence that Eden colluded with the pirates, but no further proof was forthcoming. Four of Blackbeard's crew stated in depositions following their capture that they "went from Ocacock in a periange with Edward Thache to the house of Tobias Knight Secty of North Carolina and carried in the said periangor three or foure Caggs of Sweet meets Some Loaf Sugar a bagg of Chocolate and Some boxes the Contents of which they did not know that they got to the sd Knight house about Twelve or one a Clock in the Night." Eden presented an account of his dealings with Blackbeard to the provincial council, which accepted his pleas of innocence. Nevertheless, Eden's reputation has long been clouded by his connections to Blackbeard.

Eden died of yellow fever in Bertie County in 1722 at the age of 48. Edenton, North Carolina and Edenhouse Point are named for him. His remains were later reinterred in the churchyard of St. Paul's Church, Edenton.

== Personal life ==
Eden's step-daughter Penelope married Gabriel Johnston, the sixth governor of North Carolina. His great-grandson through that marriage was United States Congressman William Johnston Dawson.

== In popular culture ==
Eden was featured as a character in the Hallmark Entertainment mini series Blackbeard, played by Richard Chamberlain. The film takes severe dramatic license, portraying Eden as the governor of New Providence, the island which is now the capital of the Bahamas, as opposed to his real occupation as the governor of North Carolina. The series also puts heavy emphasis on Eden's historically alleged trade with Blackbeard, while also creating the fiction that he conspired with colonial secretary Tobias Knight to arrange the murder of Eden's stepdaughter in order to claim her inheritance.

Government offices
Preceded by Thomas Pollock; Acting	Governor of North Carolina; 1714–1722	Succeeded by Thomas Pollock; Acting
