= List of governors of the Province of North Carolina =

Governor of North Carolina
- Royal Arms of His Majesty's Government
- Style: His Excellency
- Residence: Governor's Palace, Newbern
- Appointer: Monarch of Great Britain
- Term length: At His Majesty's pleasure
- Formation: January 24, 1712
- First holder: Edward Hyde
- Final holder: Josiah Martin
- Abolished: July 4, 1776

The governor of North Carolina from 1712 to 1776 was the representative of the British monarch in North Carolina. From 1729 to 1776, he was appointed by the monarch on the advice of the secretary of state for the Southern Department and the Board of Trade. The role of the governor was to act as the de facto head of state, and he was responsible for appointing members of the provincial government after a general election. The governor served as the commander in chief of the provincial militia and had sole responsibility for defence and security.

Besides the governor, other provincial officials included a secretary, attorney general, surveyor general, the receiver general, chief justice, five customs collectors for each of the five ports in North Carolina, and a council. The council advised the governor and also served as the upper house of the legislature. The president of the council occasionally served as acting governor.

== List of governors of North Carolina (1712–1776) ==
No.	Name (Birth–Death)	Picture	Took office	Left office	Monarch (Reign)
1	His Excellency; Edward Hyde (1667–1712)		January 24, 1712	September 8, 1712	Anne (1712–1714)
—	His Excellency; Thomas Pollock (1654–1722); Council president who served in the absence of governor		September 12, 1712	May 28, 1714	Anne (1712–1714)
2	His Excellency; Charles Eden (1673–1722)		May 28, 1714	March 26, 1722	Anne (1712–1714)
—	His Excellency; Thomas Pollock (1654–1722); Council president who served in the absence of governor		March 30, 1722	August 30, 1722	George I (1714–1727)
—	His Excellency; William Reed (c. 1670–1728); Council president who served in the absence of governor		September 7, 1722	January 15, 1724	George I (1714–1727)
3	His Excellency; George Burrington (1682–1759)		January 15, 1724	July 17, 1725	George I (1714–1727)
4	His Excellency; Sir Richard Everard (1683–1733)		July 17, 1725	February 25, 1731	George II (1727–1760)
5	His Excellency; George Burrington (1682–1759)		February 25, 1731	April 17, 1734	George II (1727–1760)
—	His Excellency; Nathaniel Rice (c. 1670–1753); Council president who served in the absence of governor		April 17, 1734	November 2, 1734	George II (1727–1760)
6	His Excellency; Gabriel Johnston (1699–1752)		November 2, 1734	July 17, 1752	George II (1727–1760)
—	His Excellency; Nathaniel Rice (c. 1684–1753); Council president who served in the absence of governor		July 17, 1752	January 28, 1753	George II (1727–1760)
—	His Excellency; Matthew Rowan (d. 1760); Council president who served in the absence of governor		February 1, 1753	November 1, 1754	George II (1727–1760)
7	His Excellency; Arthur Dobbs (1689–1765)		November 1, 1754	October 27, 1764	George II (1727–1760)
8	His Excellency; William Tryon (1729–1788)		October 27, 1764	June 30, 1771	George III (1760–1776)
—	His Excellency; James Hasell (d. 1785); Council president who served in the absence of governor		July 1, 1771	August 12, 1771	George III (1760–1776)
9	His Excellency; Josiah Martin (1737–1786)		August 12, 1771	July 4, 1776	George III (1760–1776)

== See also ==
- List of first ladies and gentlemen of North Carolina
