= William Reed (British colonial official) =

Governor of North Carolina

His Excellency William Reed

Governor of North Carolina Acting
- In office 7 September 1722 – 15 January 1724
- Monarch: George I
- Preceded by: Thomas Pollock (acting)
- Succeeded by: George Burrington

Personal details
- Born: c. 1670
- Died: September 1728 Pasquotank County (present-day Camden County), North Carolina

William Reed (c. 1670 – September 1728) was a British colonial official who served as the acting governor of North Carolina from 1722 to 1724.

== Biography ==
Reed was born in 1670 and he probably arrived to North Carolina from England. Reed was appointed as a Proprietor's deputy and member of the Council in 1712, keeping these occupations for the remainder of his life. Reed was appointed Acting Governor of North Carolina on 7 September 1722, keeping the charge until the arrival of Governor Burrington on 15 January 1724, when Reed was appointed president of Council. Several lawsuits against Reed were made (between them, he was accused of sell liquor without licenses at this home, with others men). Reed repeatedly clashed with colonial governors and even wrote an official complaint from the Council about Gov. Richard Everard's administration to King George II that was sent the day after Reed's death. He died on 1728, at his home in Pasquotank County, North Carolina. Reed was married twice: The first of his wife was named Christian, with who had two sons: Christian and Joseph. His second wife was Jane, with who had a son, William.

Government offices
Preceded by Thomas Pollock; Acting	Governor of North Carolina; Acting; 1722–1724	Succeeded by George Burrington
