= Edward Hyde (governor of North Carolina) =

Governor of North Carolina (1667 – 1712)

His Excellency Edward Hyde

1st Governor of North Carolina
- In office 24 January 1712 – 8 September 1712
- Monarch: Anne
- Preceded by: Thomas Cary (as Deputy Governor of North Carolina)
- Succeeded by: Thomas Pollock (acting)

Personal details
- Born: 1667 Cheshire, England
- Died: 8 September 1712 (aged 45) Chowan Precinct (present-day Bertie County), North Carolina
- Cause of death: Yellow fever
- Spouse: Catherine Hyde (m. 1692)
- Children: 4
- Education: Oxford University (dropped out)

Edward Hyde (1667 – 8 September 1712) was a British colonial administrator who served as the first governor of North Carolina from 24 January until 8 September in 1712, when he died in office. He governed during a time of tremendous turmoil, including an internal revolt known as Cary's Rebellion and an American Indian conflict called the Tuscarora War.

== Early life and career ==
Hyde was born in 1667 to a prominent family in England and was a cousin of Anne Hyde, the first wife of King James II of England. James II and Anne Hyde were also the parents of Anne, Queen of Great Britain who appointed Edward to both his Jamaican and North Carolina positions. Edward was a son of Robert Hyde and his wife Phillis Snyed of Cheshire in England. Hyde, along with his sisters, Anne and Penelope, was raised by his grandmother, since his parents died when he was about three years old. Hyde entered Oxford University in 1683, but he did not complete a degree. In 1692, he married Catherine Rigby, whose family was prominent in Cheshire. Virginian William Byrd described her in his diary as "an abundance of life". In 1702 Hyde was appointed by Queen Anne as Jamaica’s provost marshal. Hyde served in that position without ever travelling to the Caribbean but did not find it to be lucrative.

== Governor of North Carolina ==
Though the territory between the Virginia border and the Cape Fear River was officially recognized as "north" Carolina as early as 1689, that territory and all of what would become South Carolina was collectively known as the Province of Carolina for the first few decades of settlement, with the royal governor maintaining his residence at Charleston. A deputy governor was appointed for the northern part of the province – until the meeting at which Hyde was appointed. When he arrived in Virginia, he learned that Governor Edward Tynte, who was appointed Governor of Carolina in 1708 and from whom he was to receive his commission, had died. Hyde proceeded to North Carolina without his commission, where he found dissension about to erupt in violence.

Thomas Cary was appointed Deputy Governor of North Carolina, with responsibility for northern Carolina. While he was in the southern portion of the Colony in 1706–1708, William Glover as President of the Council was acting Deputy Governor. Meanwhile, a petition had been presented to the Lords Proprietors in London by disgruntled Carolina settlers and Cary was ordered removed as Deputy Governor and the Council elected Glover as Deputy Governor. There had long been a large population of Quakers in northern Carolina and there was growing friction between the Quakers and adherents of the Church of England who wished to see it established as the official church of the colony by law. Quakers were unable, due to their beliefs, to swear oaths required of all officials on the coronation of Queen Anne. Cary returned to the region and disputed Glover's right to office claiming support from the Quakers. From 1708 until Hyde's arrival in 1710 there was violence and a disputed Assembly election. Ultimately, Hyde's authority was established when Virginia Governor Alexander Spottswood sent a militia into Carolina. A company of royal marines from the guardships in the Chesapeake Bay arrived to aid Hyde in July 1711. Cary's forces laid down their arms and submitted to Hyde.

== Death ==
Hyde died of yellow fever on 8 September 1712 in Chowan Precinct (present-day Bertie County), North Carolina.

== Personal life ==
The Hydes had a number of children but only one daughter, Anne Hyde survived them. She married George Clarke who served as acting Governor of New York.

== Honors ==
Hyde Precinct (present-day Hyde County), North Carolina, was named after him.

Government offices
Preceded by Thomas Cary as Deputy Governor of North Carolina	Governor of North Carolina; 1712	Succeeded by Thomas Pollock; Acting
