= Gabriel Johnston =

Governor of North Carolina from 1734 to 1752

His Excellency Gabriel Johnston

6th Governor of North Carolina
- In office 2 November 1734 – 17 July 1752
- Monarch: George II
- Preceded by: Nathaniel Rice (acting)
- Succeeded by: Nathaniel Rice (acting)

Personal details
- Born: 1699 Scotland
- Died: 17 July 1752 (aged 53) Bertie County, North Carolina
- Resting place: St. Paul's Church, Edenton; 36°03′40.6″N 76°36′31.8″W
- Profession: Physician, writer, professor

Gabriel Johnston (1699 – 17 July 1752) was a British colonial official who served as the sixth provincial governor of North Carolina from 1734 until his death in 1752. He was the longest serving governor, holding the office for 18 years.

== Early life and career ==
Johnston was born in Scotland in 1699. He was a physician, political writer, and professor of Oriental languages at the University of St. Andrews.

== Governor of North Carolina ==
Johnston's coat of arms

Johnston was greatly disturbed by the conditions he found in the province and deplored what he considered the moral laxity, the disregard for law, the inadequate educational facilities, and the oppression of the poor. His administration witnessed an increase in wealth, population, and development of resources.

The United Brethren purchased 100,000 acres of land and settled Wachovia. Another group emigrating in large numbers, and with especial appeal for the governor, were the Scots, who settled in the Cape Fear region. The union with England and a breakup in the clan system, as well as a pardon to all Scottish rebels who would emigrate, greatly stimulated their settlement in America. The General Assembly exempted all new settlers from taxation for ten years. It was probably motivated by a desire to increase immigration to the province, but doubtless the Scottish governor added weight to the measure.

== Honors ==
Some years later the General Assembly of North Carolina provided for the erection of a fort on the south bank of Cape Fear and named it in honor of Johnston. Johnston County was also named for him.

Government offices
Preceded by Nathaniel Rice; Acting	Governor of North Carolina; 1734–1752	Succeeded by Nathaniel Rice; Acting
