= Patricia Hollingsworth Holshouser =

First Lady of North Carolina

Member of the U.S. National Council on Economic Opportunity
- President: Gerald Ford

Chairwoman of the North Carolina Commission on Citizen Participation
- Governor: James Holshouser

First Lady of North Carolina
- In role January 5, 1973 – January 8, 1977
- Governor: James Holshouser
- Preceded by: Jessie Rae Scott
- Succeeded by: Carolyn Hunt

Personal details
- Born: Patricia Ann Hollingsworth; October 29, 1939 Asheville, North Carolina, U.S.
- Died: December 6, 2006 (aged 67) Southern Pines, North Carolina, U.S.
- Party: Republican
- Spouse: James Holshouser
- Children: 1
- Education: Wake Forest College; Appalachian State University; Wake Technical Institute; University of North Carolina at Chapel Hill
- Occupation: schoolteacher nurse

Patricia Ann Hollingsworth Holshouser (October 29, 1939 – December 6, 2006) was an American nurse and civic leader who, as the wife of Governor James Holshouser, served as First Lady of North Carolina from 1973 to 1977. At the time of her husband's election, she was the youngest woman to serve as the state's first lady. She was the North Carolina's first Republican first lady since Sarah Amanda Sanders Russell in 1901. Holshouser was appointed to the National Council on Economic Opportunity by U.S. president Gerald Ford and headed the state's Commission on Citizen Participation. In preparation for the United States Bicentennial, she hosted a conference for first ladies of Southeastern states at the Governor's Western Residence and the planned celebratory events with Girl Scouts of the USA.

After retiring from public life, Holshouser worked as a registered nurse at Moore Memorial Hospital in Southern Pines, North Carolina, as a hospice and palliative care nurse at Sandhills Hospice, and as a patient care coordinator for hospice in Scotland County, North Carolina.

== Early life and education ==
Holshouser was born Patricia Ann Hollingsworth on October 29, 1939, in Asheville, North Carolina. She had an identical twin sister, Nancy, and another sister, Linda. Her parents were Rev. Leon Howard Hollingsworth, a Baptist minister, and Bessie Jo Walker Hollingsworth. The family moved frequently in her youth, due to her father's ministry, and she grew up in Asheville, Mebane, Boone, and Winston-Salem.

She enrolled as a nursing student at Wake Forest College but postponed her education to get married in 1961. After marrying, she resumed her education and enrolled at Appalachian State University, where she graduated with a Bachelor of Science in home economics degree. Following retirement from public life, she studied at Wake Technical Institute and earned a master's degree in nursing from the University of North Carolina at Chapel Hill.

Holshouser was a member of Zeta Tau Alpha.

== Career ==
Holshouser worked as a schoolteacher for one year, in 1968, teaching sixth grade.

After obtaining her nursing degree from the University of North Carolina, she worked as a registered nurse at Moore Memorial Hospital in Southern Pines, North Carolina for several years before working at Sandhills Hospice in Moore County and as a patient care coordinator for a hospice in Scotland County.

As a nurse, she administered her husband's dialysis treatments for six years before his kidney transplant.

Holshouser volunteered with March of Dimes, the American Heart Association, the North Carolina State Mother's Association, Cripped Children and Adults, Friends of Hope, Scouting, Christmas Seal, and other charities.

== Public life ==
Holshouser became familiar with city and state government while her husband served four terms in the North Carolina General Assembly in Raleigh. She worked on her husband's political campaigns.

In 1972, her husband was elected as the governor of North Carolina, succeeding Robert W. Scott. He officially took office on January 5, 1973. The Holshousers were the first Republicans to serve as governor and first lady since Daniel Lindsay Russell and Sarah Amanda Sanders Russell in 1901. At thirty-three years of age, she was North Carolina's youngest first lady.

She accompanied the governor in 1973 on an official trip to Europe, visiting the United Kingdom and the Soviet Union.

At Holshouser's persistence, the North Carolina General Assembly passed two bills, in 1973 and 1975, to provide funding for renovations to the North Carolina Executive Mansion. The renovation, costing $854,806.70, was the most expensive renovation since the mansion was built. Most of the funds went to replacing the heating system, adding central air conditioning, changing plumbing and electrical systems, and adding a fire escape for the second and third floors. The amount left for Holshouser for the mansion's decorative elements was $35,000, so she persuaded North Carolinian and South Carolinian textile companies to donate materials for draperies, upholstering, and carpeting. With a group of volunteers, and mansion staff from the local prison, she sewed part of the window treatments.

During the renovation process, the Holshousers lived in a rented house at 4505 Long Beach Trail, from June 1975 to February 1976. When they moved back into the mansion, she hosted a viewing party of the first and second floors for workmen and the employees of the architectural and engineering firms who worked on the mansion.

In preparation for the United States Bicentennial, Holshouser hosted a conference at the Governor's Western Residence for first ladies of the southeastern states, led by First Lady Rosalynn Carter of Georgia. As a member of the board of directors for the Pines of Carolina Council of the Girl Scouts of the USA, she helped plan their bicentennial events. Girl Scouts from each of North Carolina's one hundred counties created squares for a quilt and presented it to Holshouser at the executive mansion.

In 1976, she and her husband attended a trip to Ireland for governors and first ladies from the states that were the original Thirteen Colonies.

Holshouser decorated a Christmas tree in the executive mansion's ballroom with handmade ornaments made by students from North Carolina School for the Deaf.

She headed the state's Commission on Citizen Participation and was appointed by President Gerald Ford to the National Council on Economic Opportunity, which worked directly with the Office of Economic Opportunity. She was also named to the Executive Mansion Fine Arts Committee.

== Personal life ==
While a nursing student at Wake Forest College, she began dating the lawyer James Holshouser. They married on June 17, 1961, in a ceremony officiated by her father at Wake Forest College's Davis Chapel.

On September 27, 1963, she gave birth to their daughter, Virginia Walker Holshouser. Upon moving into the North Carolina Executive Mansion in 1973, Holshouser wanted to ensure that her daughter received a normal upbringing, teaching her how to sew, cook, and make ceramic art.

After leaving public life, Holshouser and her husband moved to Southern Pines. They attended the wedding of their daughter and John Edward Mills Jr. in 1989.

She died on December 6, 2006, in Southern Pines.

Honorary titles
Preceded by Jessie Rae Scott	First Lady of North Carolina; 1973–1977	Succeeded by Carolyn Hunt
