= Dottie Martin =

First Lady of North Carolina (1937–2026)

First Lady of North Carolina
- In role January 5, 1985 – January 9, 1993
- Governor: James G. Martin
- Preceded by: Carolyn Hunt
- Succeeded by: Carolyn Hunt

Personal details
- Born: Dorothy Ann McAulay; January 21, 1937 Charlotte, North Carolina, U.S.
- Died: September 28, 2026 (aged 89) Davidson, North Carolina, U.S.
- Party: Republican
- Spouse: James G. Martin (m. 1957)
- Children: 3
- Education: Queens College; University of South Carolina
- Occupation: teacher, real estate broker

Dorothy Ann Martin (née McAulay; January 21, 1937 – September 28, 2026) was an American educator and real estate broker who, as the wife of Governor James G. Martin, served as the First Lady of North Carolina from 1985 to 1993. As first lady, she supported protections for children and substance abuse prevention efforts. Martin also relandscaped the grounds of the North Carolina Executive Mansion and contributed to the establishment of a program within the North Carolina Department of Transportation for planting wildflower beds along state highways. She also served as the chairwoman of the North Carolina Commission on Child Victimization and the North Carolina Commission on the Family.

== Early life and education ==
Martin was born in Charlotte, North Carolina, on January 21, 1937, to Benson Wood McAulay and Dorothy Louise Gill McAulay. She grew up in North Carolina and in South Carolina. She attended Queens College and the University of South Carolina with plans of becoming a director of Christian education in the Presbyterian Church.

== Career and public life ==
Martin worked in the Industrial Relations Department at Princeton University while her husband was studying for his doctorate there. In 1960, they moved to Davidson, North Carolina, where she worked as a kindergarten teacher until 1972. She later worked as a real-estate broker for seven years.

As First Lady of North Carolina, Martin used her platform to voice concerns about abused and victimized children and people suffering from drug-related problems and sexual abuse. She encouraged the establishment of resource stations in twenty-one localities throughout North Carolina where parents could have their children fingerprinted. While attending a National Governor's Conference, she learned about the Parent to Parent Program, which she brought back to North Carolina, establishing chapters in seventy of North Carolina's counties. She received a national award for her efforts with Parent to Parent. Martin was an avid supporter of substance abuse prevention and an active member of the Committee on Alcohol and Drug Abuse Among Children and Youth. Her husband appointed her to head the Commission on Child Victimization and the Commission on the Family.

She contacted the North Carolina Department of Transportation inquiring if wildflower beds could be cultivating along the state highways, after seeing a similar project in Texas. The department began a program for planting wildflowers in 1985 and won a national award for it. The award was later presented to Martin in recognition of her inspiration in starting the program.

Martin also made restorations and improvements to the North Carolina Executive Mansion during her time as first lady. Beginning with a grant from the Junior League of Raleigh, she fundraised $185,000 to re-landscape the mansion's grounds, in particular the Victorian garden on the south lawn. She started public tours of the gardens and created an informative brochure about the grounds. The Victorian garden was officially re-dedicated to Martin on May 27, 1987. In 1988, Martin helped establish the Executive Mansion Fund, a non-profit that raised more than two million dollars for restoration efforts. In 1991, the Executive Mansion's centennial year, Martin encouraged the production of a historical video and book on the mansion, and established the curator's office. She also requested that the portrait of former first lady Jeanelle C. Moore, who established the Executive Mansion Fine Arts Committee, be hung in the Ladies Parlour.

Along with the executive mansion, Martin redecorated the Governor's Western Residence in Asheville. She received two grants totaling $11,500 from the Janivre Foundation of Asheville and the Blumenthal Foundation of Charlotte to art, crafts, and furnishings for the western residence. She had the original kitchen and breakfast room combined to make a larger, more modern kitchen.

== Personal life and death ==
Martin met her husband, James G. Martin, while attending a Presbyterian youth conference. They married on June 1, 1957, and had three children: James Grubbs Martin Jr., Emily Wood Martin, and Arthur Benson Martin. The family lived in Washington, D.C. during her husband's term as a member of the United States House of Representatives. During her husband's term as Governor of North Carolina, the family lived in the North Carolina Executive Mansion in Raleigh. After her husband's term ended, they retired to their home in Charlotte and lake house on Lake Norman.

She served on the board of trustees of Queens University of Charlotte, on the board of the Thurston Arthritis Center, and on the advisory board of the Family Center for Abused and Neglected Children. A scholarship at the University of North Carolina at Chapel Hill was named in honor of her and her husband. The North Carolina Federation of Republican Women also established a scholarship in her honor, called The Dottie Martin Teachers Scholarship.

Martin died on September 28, 2026, at the age of 89, at The Pines in Davidson, North Carolina. Following her death, Governor Josh Stein ordered that all U.S. and North Carolina flags at state facilities be flown at half-staff from October 1, 2026 to October 5, 2026.

Honorary titles
Preceded by Carolyn Hunt	First Lady of North Carolina; 1985–1993	Succeeded by Carolyn Hunt
