= Jessie Rae Scott =

American politician (1929–2010)

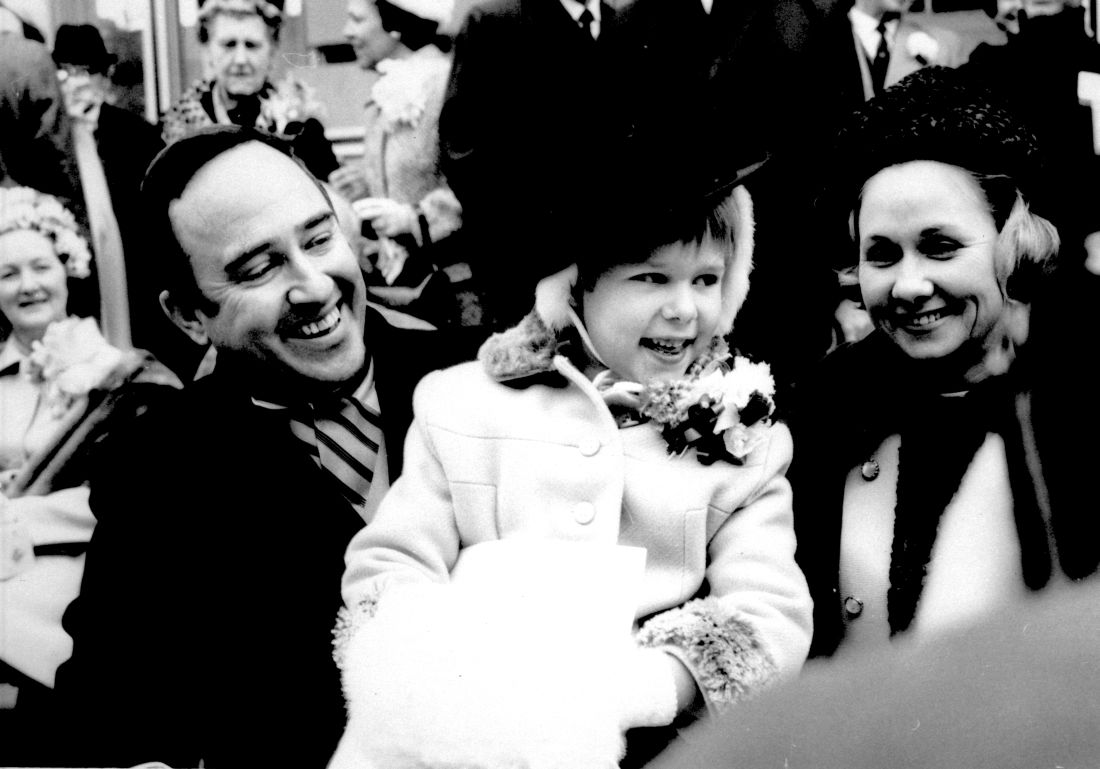
- Scott (right) with her daughter and husband in 1969.

First Lady of North Carolina
- In role January 3, 1969 – January 5, 1973
- Governor: Robert W. Scott
- Preceded by: Jeanelle Coulter Moore
- Succeeded by: Patricia Hollingsworth Holshouser

Second Lady of North Carolina
- In office January 8, 1965 – January 3, 1969
- Preceded by: Frances Thompson Philpott
- Succeeded by: Elizabeth Lockhart Taylor

Personal details
- Born: October 12, 1929 Swepsonville, North Carolina, U.S.
- Died: December 26, 2010 (aged 81) Durham, North Carolina, U.S.
- Party: Democratic
- Spouse: Robert W. Scott (m. 1951; died 2009)
- Children: 5

Jessie Rae Scott (October 12, 1929 – December 26, 2010) was an American politician who served as the First Lady of North Carolina from 1969 to 1973 through her marriage to North Carolina Governor Robert W. Scott.

Scott unsuccessfully sought the Democratic nomination for North Carolina Labor Commissioner in 1976 and served as the state coordinator for the Jimmy Carter presidential campaign. She also acted as the chief lobbyist for North Carolina's Equal Rights Amendment for women.

== Biography ==
=== Early life ===
Scott was born in Swepsonville, North Carolina. She received a bachelor's degree from Greensboro Women's College, which is now the University of North Carolina at Greensboro.

Scott married her husband, Robert W. Scott, in 1951. The two had met in third grade and began dating in high school. She then worked as a public school teacher for three years before quitting to commit more time to her family. She had five children. In 1959 Scott and her husband were voted by the National Grange of the Order of Patrons of Husbandry as one of the five top "Young Grange Couples" in the country.

=== First Lady ===
Scott served as First Lady of North Carolina from 1969 to 1973.

=== Political involvement ===
In 1975 William C. Creel, a Democrat serving as North Carolina Commissioner of Labor, suffered a heart attack and died. Governor James Holshouser appointed a Republican, Thomas Avery Nye, Jr., to replace him. Scott decided to seek the Democratic nomination for the office the following year, declaring herself a candidate on April 28, 1976. In her announcement she said, "In North Carolina almost half of the total labor force is women, and I see no reason why a woman could not and should not be a part of administering laws which have to do with the working environment of all workers in this state, man or woman." One of four candidates, she presented herself as conservative and friendly to business interests, contrary to how members of the Scott family had previously presented themselves as progressives. She argued that, "Individuals, small businesses and industries are overwhelmed by the burden of governmental regulations and forms to fill out. What is needed is not more government, but better government."

In the first Democratic primary, Scott came in first with 37 percent of the vote while Raleigh attorney John C. Brooks finished second with 33 percent. As Scott had failed to secure an absolute majority, Brooks called for a run-off primary. Scott criticised Brooks—who had the backing of state AFL–CIO president Wilbur Hobby—as being too close to organized labor factions, though Brooks deflected this by pointing out that her family members had been elected to public office with the support of labor unions. Brooks won the second primary with 51 percent of the vote.

=== Later life ===
In 1982, Scott became the chairwoman of the North Carolina chapter of the American Cancer Society. The American Cancer Society honored her with its Sword of Hope award that same year and granted her honorary life membership in the organization in 1995.

On July 17, 2009, Scott fell at a friend's house and sustained a traumatic brain injury. She was hospitalized a year later due to complications from the fall. Unable to communicate in her last days, she died at Hillcrest Convalescent Center in Durham on December 26, 2010, at the age of 81. Her funeral was held at the Hawfields Presbyterian Church in Mebane, North Carolina.

== Works cited ==
- Christensen, Rob (2019). The Rise and Fall of the Branchhead Boys: North Carolina's Scott Family and the Era of Progressive Politics. Chapel Hill: The University of North Carolina Press. ISBN 9781469651057.

Honorary titles
Preceded by Jeanelle C. Moore	First Lady of North Carolina; 1969–1973	Succeeded by Patricia Hollingsworth Holshouser
