= North Carolina Governor's Western Residence =

House in Asheville, North Carolina

Coordinates: 35°37′25″N 82°31′55″W

Governor's Western Residence

General information
- Status: Active
- Type: official residence
- Location: 45 Patton Mountain Road; Asheville, North Carolina, U.S.
- Completed: 1939
- Owner: North Carolina Government

The North Carolina Governor's Western Residence is the secondary official residence of the governor of North Carolina, located in Asheville. It is managed by the first lady of North Carolina. The governor's primary residence is the North Carolina Executive Mansion in Raleigh. The western residence is one of five or fewer state-owned second homes in the United States.

== History ==
The house was originally built in 1939 by Tom Brimer, the owner of Good Humor Ice Cream. It's located at top of Town Mountain, 2.5 miles from downtown Asheville, North Carolina, and 3.5 miles from the Blue Ridge Parkway. The second owner of the home was Earnestr A. Hamil. In 1964, during the administration of Governor Terry Sanford, the Asheville Chamber of Commerce donated the residence to the state government with the hope that the governors would spend more time, and pay more attention to, Western North Carolina. The 6,000-square-foot (560 m^{2}) mansion sits on 18 acres (73,000 m^{2}) of land. It is the official second residence of the governor and their family, and is one of five or fewer state-owned second homes in the United States. The house is managed by the first lady of North Carolina. The grounds include a rhododendron garden and an heirloom-daylily garden. Margaret Rose Sanford was the first of the state's first ladies to be charged with decorating the house.

The home has been used by first families of North Carolina, as well as Congresswoman Gabrielle Giffords, Billy Graham, and local garden clubs, schools, and libraries for various events. In preparation for the United States Bicentennial, First Lady Patricia Hollingsworth Holshouser hosted a conference at the mansion for first ladies of the southeastern states, led by First Lady Rosalynn Carter of Georgia.

During the administration of Governor James G. Martin, First Lady Dottie Martin redecorated the interior of the mansion. She received two grants, in total $11,500, from the Janivre Foundation of Asheville and the Blumenthal Foundation of Charlotte to purchase art, crafts, and furnishings for the residence. Martin combined the original kitchen and breakfast room to make a larger, more modern kitchen.

In 1993, Governor Jim Hunt and First Lady Carolyn Hunt added a rock-and-wood barbecue pavilion to the grounds.

The home is open to the public annually during the holiday season for an open house.

== See also ==
- North Carolina Executive Mansion, primary official residence of the governor of North Carolina
- Bailey-Tucker House, the former official guest house of the governor of North Carolina
- Hawkins-Hartness House, official office of the lieutenant governor of North Carolina
