= Carolyn Hunt =

First Lady of North Carolina

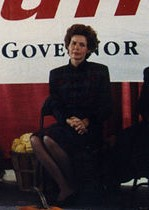
- Hunt in 1992 during a campaign event

69th and 71st First Lady of North Carolina
- In role January 9, 1993 – January 6, 2001
- Governor: Jim Hunt
- Preceded by: Dottie Martin
- Succeeded by: Mary P. Easley
- In role January 8, 1977 – January 5, 1985
- Governor: Jim Hunt
- Preceded by: Patricia Hollingsworth Holshouser
- Succeeded by: Dottie Martin

Member of the Wilson County Public School Board
- In office 1986–1990

Second Lady of North Carolina
- In role January 6, 1973 – January 8, 1977
- Lieutenant Governor: Jim Hunt
- Preceded by: Elizabeth Lockhart Taylor
- Succeeded by: Alice Clark Green

Personal details
- Born: Carolyn Joyce Leonard; July 3, 1937 (age 89) Mingo, Iowa, U.S.
- Party: Democratic
- Spouse: James Baxter Hunt Jr. (m. 1958; died 2025)
- Children: 4 (including Rachel and Baxter)
- Parent(s): Carl Avery Leonard; Norma Henderson
- Education: Iowa State Teachers College; University of North Carolina at Chapel Hill
- Occupation: teacher

Carolyn Joyce Hunt (née Leonard; born July 3, 1937) is an American educator and politician who, as the wife of Jim Hunt, served as the Second Lady of North Carolina from 1973 to 1977 and twice-served as the First Lady of North Carolina, from 1977 to 1985 and again from 1993 to 2001. She is the longest serving first lady in North Carolina history and she and her husband were the first governor and first lady to serve two four-year terms in North Carolina. As first lady, she served as the Chairwoman of the advisory council for the Governor's Office of Citizen Affairs, which promoted volunteerism throughout the state, and as Chairwoman of the North Carolina Friendship Force Program, a chapter of Friendship Force International, which promoted international student exchange programs in state public schools. In between her terms as first lady, she served on the board of directors and the executive committee of Friendship Force International and, in 1986, was elected to the Wilson County Public School Board.

== Early life and education ==
Hunt was born Carolyn Joyce Leonard on July 3, 1937, in Mingo, Iowa, to Carl Avery Leonard and Norma Henderson Leonard. In her youth, she spent time living in Germany as an exchange student. She met her future husband, James Baxter Hunt II, at a National Grange of the Order of Patrons of Husbandry Youth Conference in Hamilton, Ohio. She was a member of the National Grange Youth Committee and he was serving as the president of the North Carolina Grange Youth Chapter. Hunt attended Iowa State Teachers College until she became engaged. She moved to Raleigh, North Carolina, where she earned a bachelor's degree in primary education from the University of North Carolina at Chapel Hill.

== Career and public life ==
In 1964, the Hunt family moved to the Kingdom of Nepal, where her husband served as a Ford Foundation economic adviser to the government. The family lived there until 1966. During this time, Hunt worked as a teacher at an international school. When they returned to the United States, Hunt continued to teach while her husband practiced law.

In 1972, her husband was elected lieutenant governor of North Carolina. In 1976, her husband was elected to his first term as governor. Her inauguration gown, a dress of pale gold organza designed by Mary Dixon, was placed in a collection of the North Carolina Museum of History. During her time as first lady, Hunt inspired her husband to create the Governor's Office of Citizen Affairs, in order to promote volunteer initiatives across the state. She was named chairwoman of the advisory council of the office, and promoted volunteerism throughout North Carolina. Hunt organized the "Right to Read" project in Wilson County, promoting child literacy in public schools. Once a week, she assisted fifth-graders in reading and comprehension skills at Wiley Elementary School in Raleigh. In 1977, while attending the National Governor's Conference, Hunt was introduced to the Friendship Force International, an international exchange project promoting world peace through sharing cultures. In 1979, she was appointed as the North Carolina Friendship Force Program's Chairwoman. Through the program, Hunt and her youngest daughter spent ten days with a family in Newcastle-upon-Tyne in England, before hosting the family in North Carolina.

Hunt did not initially make many changes to the North Carolina Executive Mansion during her husband's first term, with the exception of adding storm windows to the exterior and dampers in the fireplaces. She later proposed a revision to the North Carolina General Assembly's statute governing the Executive Mansion Fine Arts Committee, which was approved. After the passing of the proposal, Hunt renovated and redecorated the governor's library and had the screen porch made into a glass-enclosed morning room. She oversaw renovations to the institutional kitchen, added a first-floor waiting room, installed an automated lift at the front porch for handicapped guests, and restored and repaired antique furniture. Hunt also acquired new pieces for the mansion, including twelve Chippendale-style side chairs featuring needlepoint seats made by women throughout North Carolina. She located and framed photographs of all former North Carolinian first ladies who had lived in the mansion, putting them on display on a gallery wall.

On October 20, 1979, the Hunt's oldest daughter, Rebecca, married Jimmy Hawley at the Executive Mansion. Hunt sewed the bridesmaids dresses that were worn during the ceremony. She had previously designed and made two of her daughters' dresses for her husband's first inaugural ball. When their youngest daughter, Elizabeth, married Kevin Amigh on September 9, 1995 at the mansion, Hunt designed the outfits for the bridal attendants. Hunt established the Bailey-Tucker House, a historic mansion near downtown Raleigh, as the state's official guest residence. During the 400th anniversary of the settlement of Roanoke Island, she christened a replica ship of Queen Elizabeth 2 and hosted Anne, Princess Royal.

After his first term, her husband was succeeded by Republican James G. Martin. Returning to life as a private citizen, Hunt continued to work with the Friendship Force and led a student exchange to Russia. She also served on the board of directors and the executive committee for Friendship Force International. In 1986, she was elected to the Wilson County Public School Board and served in that capacity until 1990.

When her husband was reelected as governor in 1993, Hunt used her position as first lady to focus on education, early childhood health, volunteerism, and women's health issues. She volunteered weekly in local soup kitchens, hosted volunteering events at the Executive Mansion, and volunteered as a tutor and mentor at Lucille Hunter Elementary School and Fred J. Carnage Middle School in Raleigh. As a supporter of Smart Start, a statewide school-readiness initiative started by her husband, Hunt traveled to counties throughout North Carolina to visit daycare centers and preschools to meet with care providers and early childhood educators. Because of her efforts to improve early childhood education resources, she was appointed as the honorary chair of the North Carolina Partnership for Children. In 1993, she had an official portrait of her predecessor, First Lady Dottie Martin, removed from the Executive Mansion and sent to the North Carolina Museum of Art. She replaced the portrait with another of former First Lady Jeanelle C. Moore.

Hunt displayed schoolchildren's artwork during tours of the Executive Mansion and, in 1993, implemented tours of the residence for blind visitors. In 1996, she served as a member of the advisory committee for the U.S. Women's Open Golf Tournament in Pinehurst, North Carolina. She and her husband made international visits to promote education. While in Israel, she met with Prime Minister Yitzhak Rabin and his wife, Leah Rabin, to discuss children's education and rights. She visited several schools in Israel and began a cultural exchange between an Israeli elementary school and a Raleigh school.

== Personal life ==
Hunt married Jim Hunt on August 20, 1958 and had four children: Rebecca Joyce Hunt, James Baxter Hunt III, Rachel Henderson Hunt, and Elizabeth Brame Hunt. The family owned a farm near Rock Ridge in Wilson County, North Carolina, where she and her children would spend at least two months every summer to have time away from the North Carolina Executive Mansion in Raleigh. On their farm, the family maintained two gardens, and Hunt would freeze and can vegetables grown in their gardens.

In 2015, Hunt and her husband received the Public School Forum of North Carolina’s Annual Jay Robinson Education Leadership Award.

Honorary titles
Preceded by Patricia Hollingsworth Holshouser	First Lady of North Carolina; 1977–1985	Succeeded by Dottie Martin
Honorary titles
Preceded by Dottie Martin	First Lady of North Carolina; 1993–2001	Succeeded by Mary P. Easley
