= J. & L. Lobmeyr =

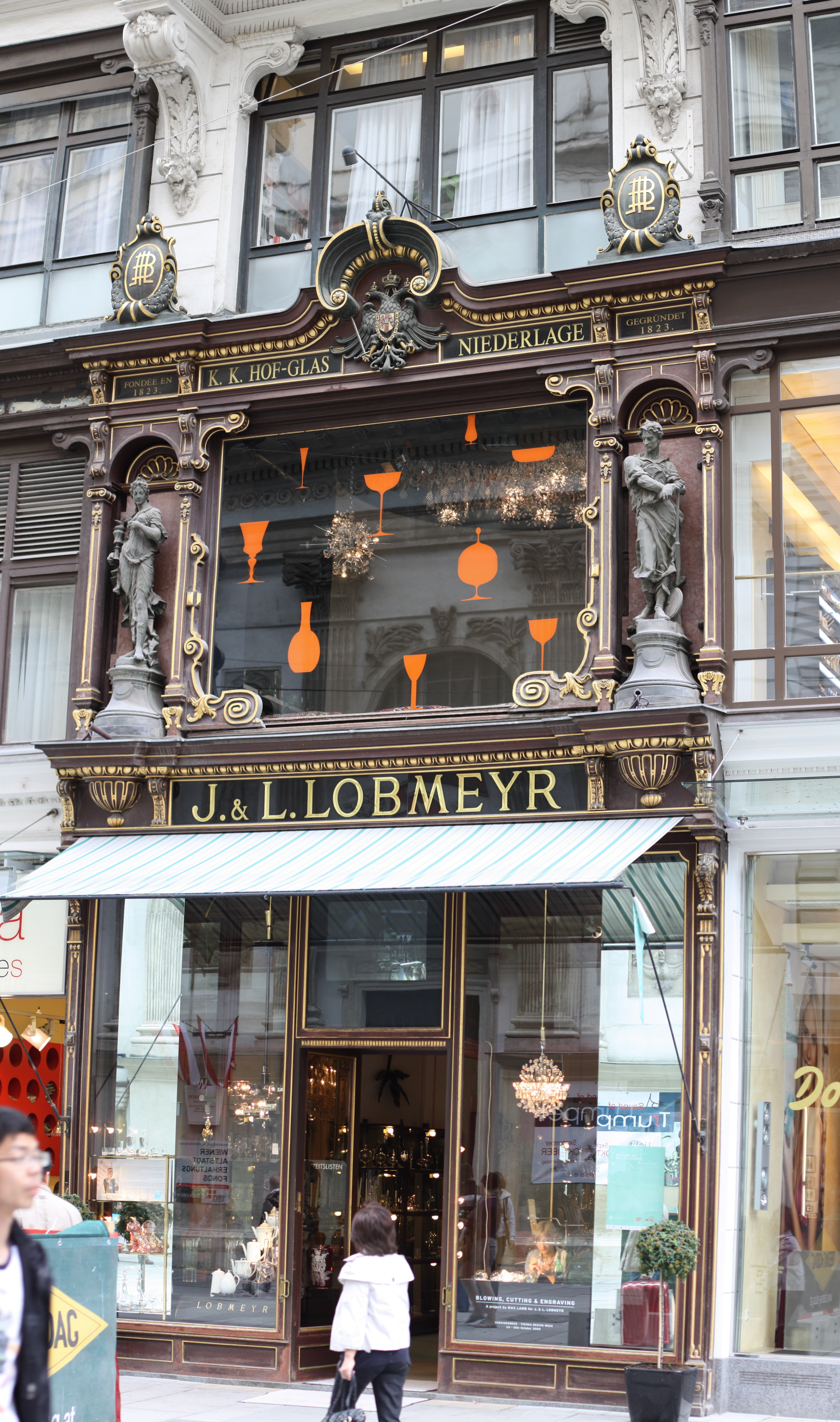
J. & L. Lobmeyr main store at the Kärntner Straße in Vienna

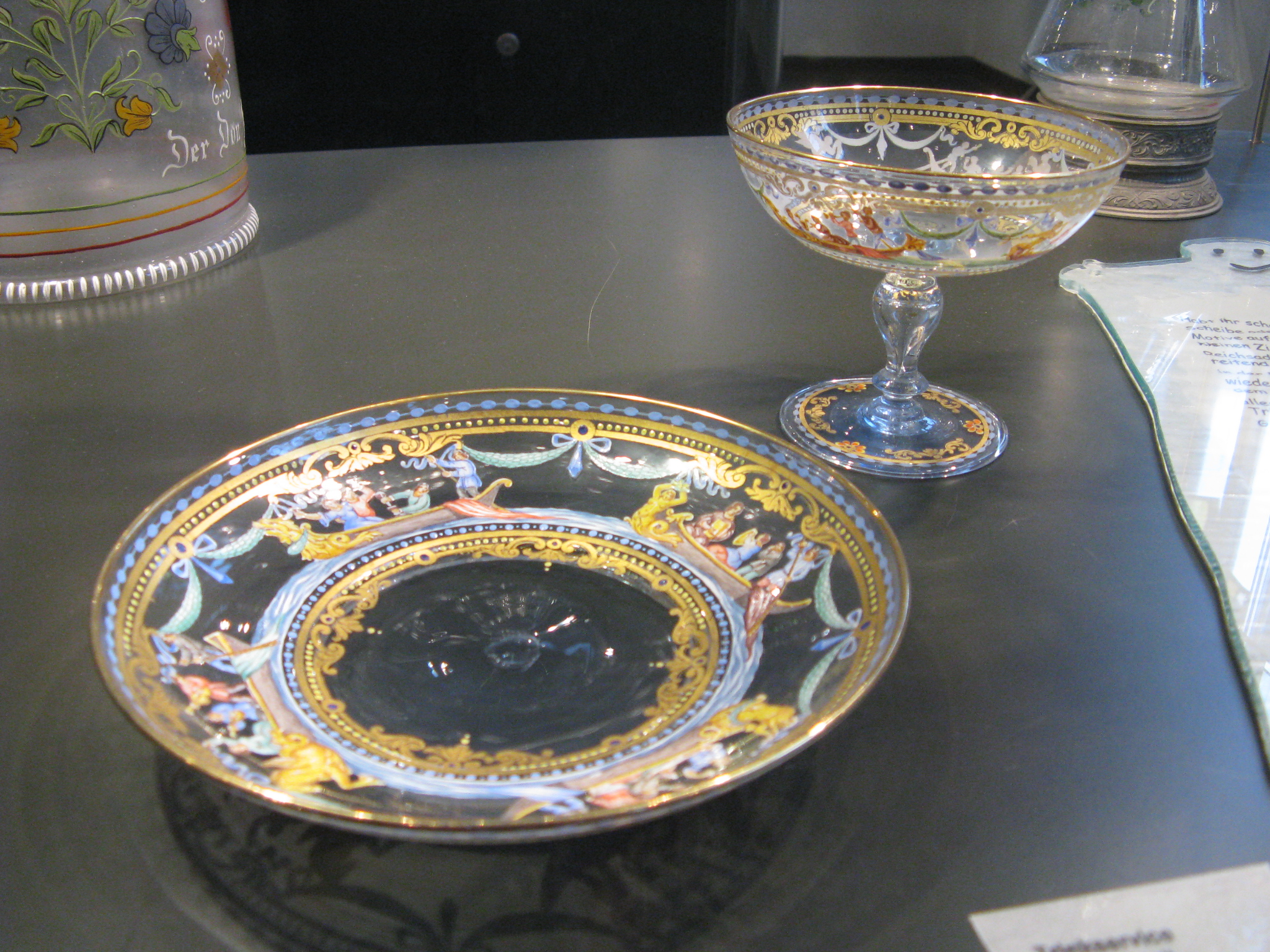
Glass by Lobmeyr, around 1880

J. & L. Lobmeyr is a glassware company from Vienna, Austria. It was founded in 1823 and is still family owned.

== History ==
The company was founded in 1823 by Josef Lobmeyr (17 March 1792 – 8 May 1855). When his children acquired the company they renamed it J. & L. Lobmeyr, named after his son Joseph and brother Louis. Joseph became the marketing director and Louis managed the art department. Ludwig Lobmeyr (2 August 1829 – 25 March 1917) developed further professional relationships with Bohemian glassworks and glass making companies. They had an office at Kamenický Šenov and partners included Wilhelm Kralik of Meyrswalden.

J. & L. Lobmeyr provided a crystal chandelier for Schönbrunn Palace and other clients. They also had a partnership with Thomas Edison. They co-developed the first electric chandeliers in the world, in 1880, with Edison. They provided services for the King of Belgium, the Duke of Brabant, and the Court of Flanders. In 1906 they opened an office in Karlovy Vary. Around this time, clients included Archduke Franz Ferdinand of Austria. In recognition of their services, they were titled purveyor to the Imperial Court. In 1917, Louis died. The company was left to Stefan Rath (1876–1960), Louis' nephew. Additional clients included the Vienna State Opera, the Metropolitan Opera, the John F. Kennedy Center for the Performing Arts, and the Kremlin. As of 1962, Rath had written a history of the family and company.

Ludwig Lobmeyr (2 August, 1829 in Vienna; † March 25, 1917) expanded the contacts to Bohemian glassworks and glass finishing workshops that his father had already established; he maintained several branches in the region and hired glass cutters and engravers for himself. Kamenický Šenov and the surrounding area was a center for the recruitment of artists. Ludwig also worked closely with the Bohemian glass manufacturer Wilhelm Kralik von Meyrswalden, the husband of his sister Louise. He had many of his glass designs produced in the company of his brother-in-law Meyr's nephew in Adolf near Winterberg.

Under Ludwig's management, the company J. &. L. Lobmeyr became a court glassware dealer in 1860. It supplied crystal chandeliers for the Hofburg, Schönbrunn Palace and the Bavarian royal palaces. Ludwig, himself an enthusiastic patron of the arts and collector, also knew artists and scientists outside the field of glassmaking, such as Theophil von Hansen and Josef Hoffmann. In 1882, in collaboration with Thomas Alva Edison, he equipped the Redoutensäle with the world's first electric chandeliers. He was appointed to the House of Lords (upper house of parliament) by Emperor Franz Joseph I in 1887 and made an honorary citizen of the city of Vienna in 1889. He turned down the offer to apply for the nobility.

Lobmeyr was also a purveyor to the Bavarian, Serbian, Greek and Bulgarian courts. Earlier suppliers included the King of Belgium, the Duke of Brabant and the Count of Flanders. In 1907, another branch was opened in Karlsbad. A very large service was produced for the heir to the throne Franz Ferdinand, who had previously selected the motifs in the Museum of Applied Arts, Vienna.

When Ludwig died childless in 1917, he bequeathed the company to Stefan Rath (1876–1960), the son of his sister Mathilde. In 1907, another branch was opened in Karlsbad. A very large service was produced for the heir to the throne Franz Ferdinand, who had previously selected the motifs in the K.K. Austrian Museum of Art and Industry.

The company survived the Second World War and in the post-war period, orders for the chandeliers and candelabras in the Vienna State Opera, the theater in Luxembourg, the Metropolitan Opera in New York, the John F. Kennedy Center for the Performing Arts in Washington DC and the Kremlin in Moscow kept business going.

Today, the company is still owned by Rath's grand children Andreas, Leonid and Johannes.

== See also ==
- Strauss chandelier
