= First Presbyterian Church (Raleigh, North Carolina) =

Church in Raleigh, North Carolina

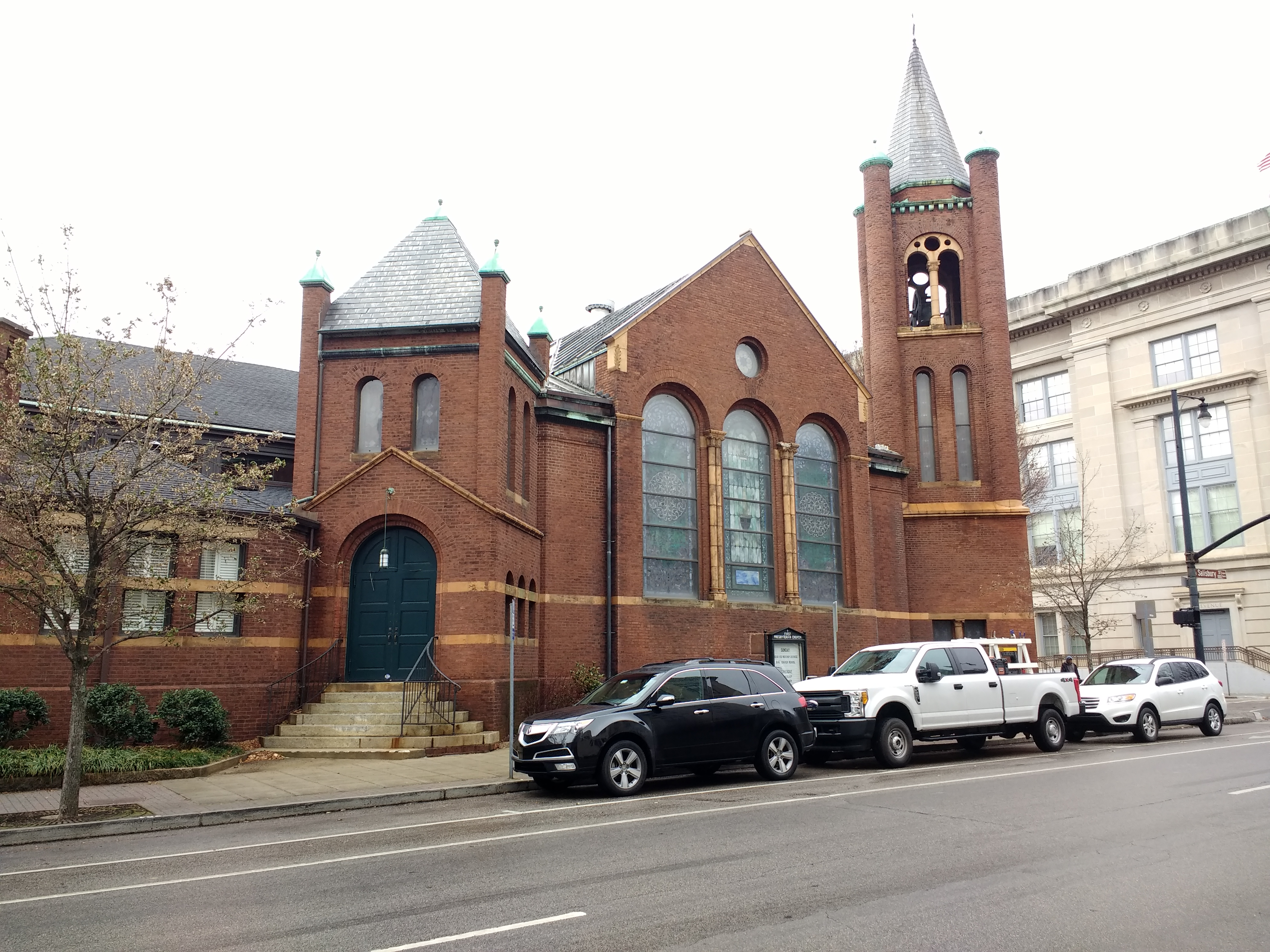

Religion
- Affiliation: Presbyterian Church (USA)
- District: Presbytery of New Hope
- Leadership: Dr. Tara Bulger, Senior Pastor
- Status: Active

Location
- Location: 112 S. Salisbury Street, Raleigh, North Carolina, United States
- Interactive map of First Presbyterian Church
- Coordinates: 35.7794°N 78.6404°W

Architecture
- Style: Romanesque Revival
- Completed: 1900 (current church)

First Presbyterian Church is a historic Presbyterian church located at the corner of Morgan and Salisbury Streets in downtown Raleigh, Wake County, North Carolina, United States.

The church was established in a meeting of Presbyterians at the North Carolina State House (predecessor of the North Carolina State Capitol) on Jan. 21, 1816. The congregation purchased land at the present location and erected a brick church building that opened on February 7, 1818. The church served as the site for the State Constitutional Convention of 1835 and as the meeting place for the North Carolina Supreme Court for several years.

That original structure was torn down and a new church building completed in 1900. It was designed in the Romanesque Revival style. The initial design was by architect A.G. Bauer, but Bauer's health problems caused the project to be turned over to architects Charles E. Cassell and Charles Pearson. The sanctuary has been extensively remodeled twice, in 1955 and 2012.

== Relevant literature ==
- Jonas, W. Glenn Jr. 2016. A Cloud of Witnesses from the Heart of the City: First Presbyterian Church, Raleigh, 1816-2016. Macon, GA: Mercer University Press.
