= Margaret Rose Sanford =

First Lady of North Carolina

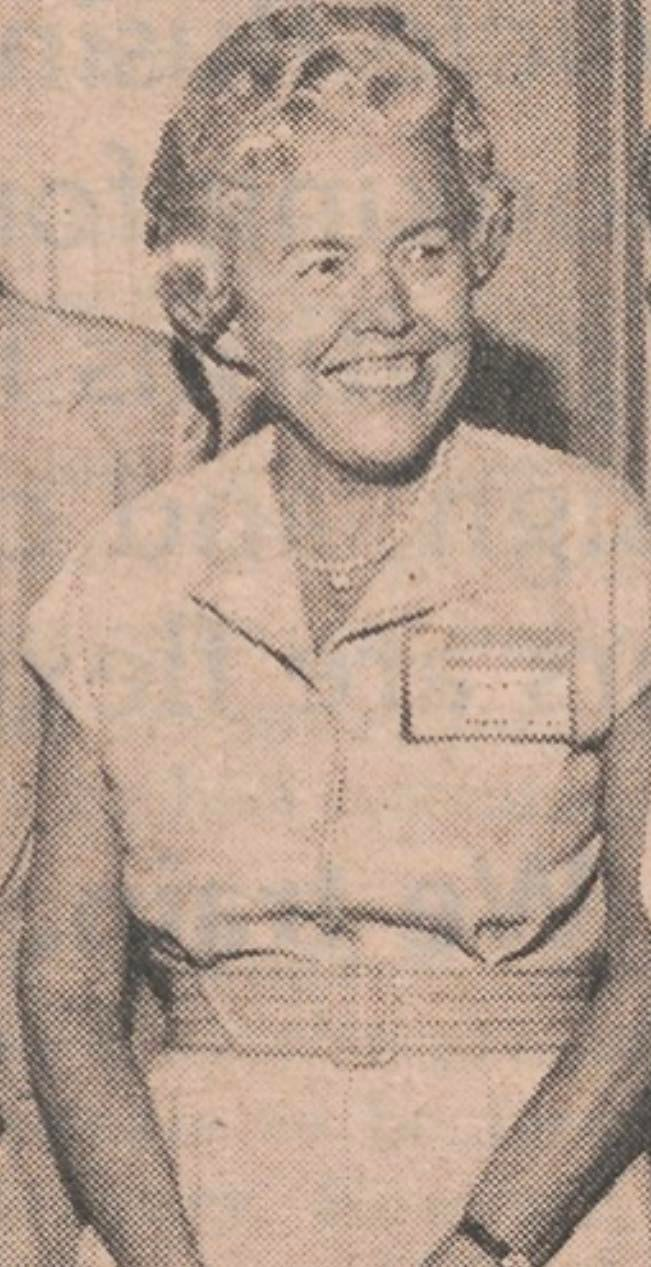
- Sanford in 1980

First Lady of North Carolina
- Assumed role January 5, 1961 – January 8, 1965
- Governor: Terry Sanford
- Preceded by: Martha Blakeney Hodges
- Succeeded by: Jeanelle C. Moore

Personal details
- Born: Margaret Rose Knight; June 6, 1918 Hopkinsville, Kentucky, U.S.
- Died: August 26, 2006 (aged 88) Duke University Hospital, Durham, North Carolina, U.S.
- Resting place: Duke University Chapel
- Party: Democratic
- Spouse: Terry Sanford (m. 1942; died 1998)
- Children: 2
- Parent(s): John Richard Knight IV; Elizabeth Adams Foard
- Education: Christian College; University of North Carolina at Chapel Hill
- Occupation: teacher, philanthropist

Margaret Rose Sanford (née Knight; June 6, 1918 – August 26, 2006) was an American civic leader, teacher, and philanthropist who, as the wife of Terry Sanford, served as First Lady of North Carolina from 1961 to 1965. Prior to entering public life, she worked as a teacher in North Carolina and Kentucky. As first lady, Sanford hosted the first annual North Carolina Symphony Ball in 1961, established a library of North Carolinian books at the North Carolina Executive Mansion, and planted a rose garden on the mansion's grounds. She was the first governor's wife to decorate the Governor's Western Residence in Asheville. Sanford sent her children to the first racially integrated public elementary school in Raleigh, North Carolina, while the family lived in the executive mansion. She served on the board of the Methodist Home for Children, the North Carolina School of the Arts, the Stagville Plantation Restoration Board, and East Carolina University. She was also a member of the Education Commission of the States and the Defense Department Advisory Committee on Women in the Services. While Sanford's husband served as president of Duke University, she was appointed by Governor Jim Hunt to serve on a delegation of university faculty and administrators to China in 1975.

== Early life, family, and education ==
Sanford was born Margaret Rose Knight on June 6, 1918, in Hopkinsville, Kentucky, to John Richard Knight IV and Elizabeth Adams Foard Knight. She had a brother, Colonel John Richard Knight V. Her paternal grandfather, John Richard Knight III, immigrated to the United States from Dudley, West Midlands, England. She was orphaned at a young age, and was raised by her aunt, Hettie Dickinson. She trained in classical music on the piano and the organ.

Sanford attended Christian College in Columbia, Missouri, before transferring to the University of North Carolina at Chapel Hill, where she graduated in 1941. She originally transferred to study dramatic and theatre arts with the Playmakers Theatre, but later changed her major to English.

== Career and public life ==
After graduating from the University of North Carolina at Chapel Hill in 1941, Sanford worked as a teacher in the Chatham County Public Schools District. When her husband was serving overseas during World War II, she returned to Kentucky and worked as a teacher there.

She assumed the role of First Lady of North Carolina in 1961 upon her husband's inauguration as governor. Her inaugural gown, a shrimp-colored peau de soie dress, is in a collection of the North Carolina Museum of History. She and her husband held the first annual North Carolina Symphony Ball in 1961. Sanford began a library of North Carolina books at the North Carolina Executive Mansion and started a rose garden in the northwest corner of the mansion's grounds, at the intersection of Blount and Lane Streets. In 1964, the Governor's Western Residence in Asheville was donated to the state government by the Asheville Chamber of Commerce to serve as a vacation home for the first family. She travelled frequently with her husband around the United States for governors' conferences. In 1964 a political reporter with Raleigh Times stated that Sanford "always seemed to be bubbling over with good cheer. She has a spontaneous wit."

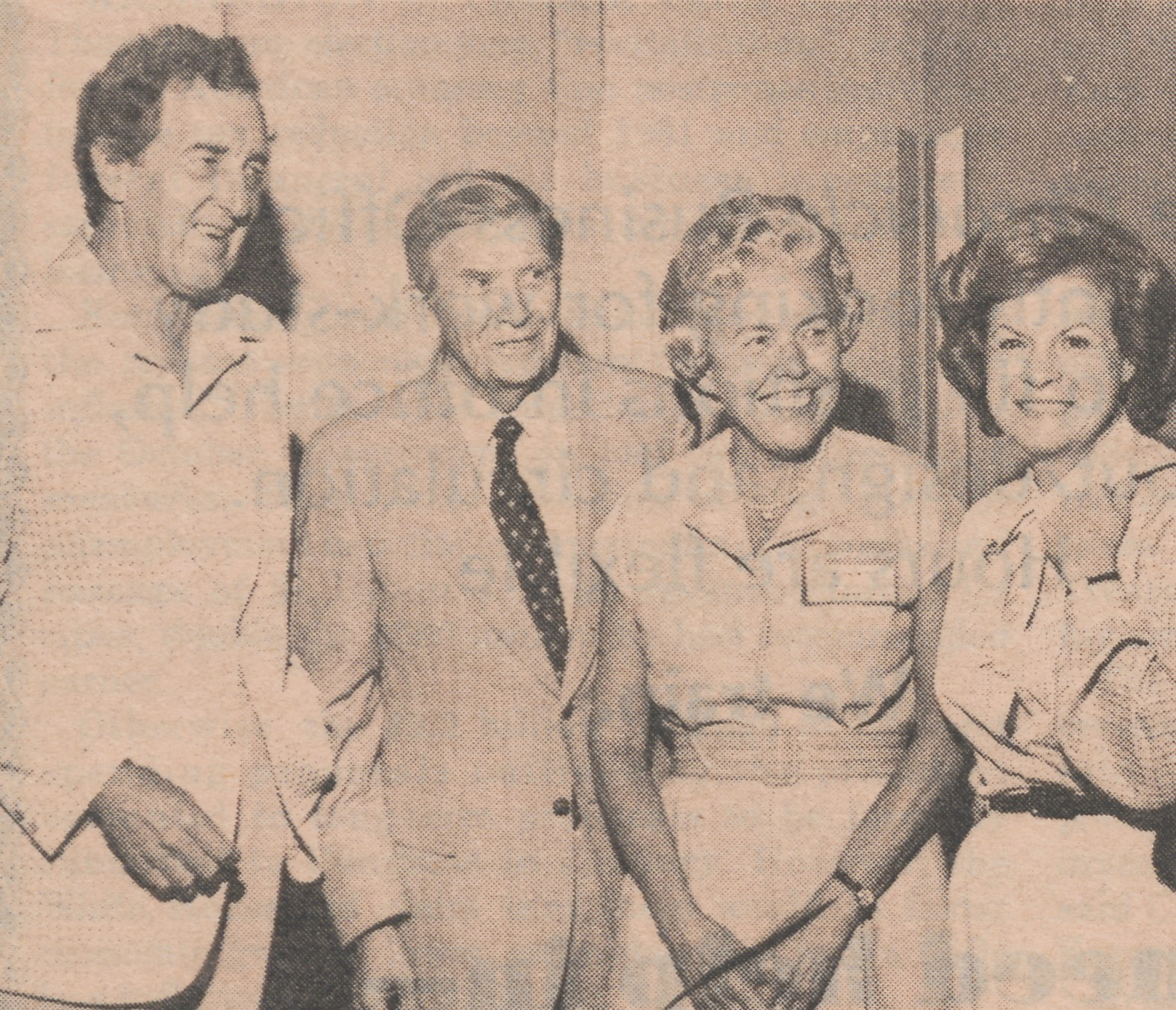
Margaret Rose Sanford (second from the right) with Edmund Muskie, Terry Sanford and Jane Muskie in 1980.

In 1969 Sanford's husband became president of Duke University, and the family moved into the Knight House near Duke Forest in Durham, North Carolina. During her husband's tenure at Duke, Sanford served on the board for the Methodist Home for Children in Raleigh and on the board of trustees at East Carolina University. She was also a board member of the North Carolina School of the Arts, the North Carolina Symphony Board, and the Stagville Plantation Restoration Board, and was a member of the Education Commission of the States and the Defense Department Advisory Committee on Women in the Services. In 1975 she was appointed by Governor Jim Hunt to serve on a delegation of Duke University faculty and administrators to visit the People's Republic of China.

In April 1999 Sanford and her family attended a White House ceremony at which President Bill Clinton signed a bill naming the Raleigh Federal Building after her husband. In August 1999 she attended the dedication ceremony for the building in Raleigh.

== Personal life ==
Sanford met her future husband, James Terry Sanford, in Chapel Hill, North Carolina. They married on July 4, 1942, at her aunt's home in Hopkinsville, just before her husband enlisted in the United States Army as a paratrooper. She and her husband had two children: Elizabeth Knight Sanford and James Terry Sanford Jr. The family were United Methodists.

While living in the executive mansion in Raleigh, Sanford enrolled her children in Wake County Public Schools. The elementary school the children were enrolled in, Murphey Elementary School, had recently been integrated, and was the first public school in Raleigh where a black student, William Campbell, was educated alongside white students. She frequently invited her niece, who was a student at Saint Mary's School, to spend weekends with the family at the mansion. An amateur organist and pianist, she started taking violin lessons as an adult.

After her husband's retirement from Duke in 1986, the Sanfords moved into a house close to Duke University West Campus. When her husband was elected to the United States Senate in 1987, she moved to Washington, D.C., but would return to Durham on the weekends. After her husband's tenure in the Senate was over, the family returned to Durham and moved into a house that the Sanfords had designed. She remained in their house there following the death of her husband in 1998. She later moved to an apartment at The Forest at Duke Continuing Care Retirement Community in Durham.

== Death and legacy ==
Sanford died on August 26, 2006, at Duke University Hospital. Her funeral was held at Duke University Chapel on August 31, 2006. She is buried in the chapel's crypt, next to her husband.

Sanford Hall at Appalachian State University was named in honor of Margaret and Terry Sanford.

Honorary titles
Preceded by Martha Blakeney Hodges	First Lady of North Carolina; 1961–1965	Succeeded by Jeanelle C. Moore
