= A. G. Bauer =

American architect

Adolphus Gustavus Bauer (1858–1898) was an architect in North Carolina. He worked with the more famous architect Samuel Sloan and helped him build the Executive Mansion in Raleigh.

In 1896, Bauer survived a train accident when his carriage was struck by a train. His mental health reportedly started deteriorating and his reputation was ruined. In 1897, his Cherokee wife died and he constructed an elaborate tombstone for her in the style of a Greek temple. In 1898, he committed suicide by shooting himself in the head.

== Life ==
Bauer struggled to find business after the death of his partner Samuel Sloan and left Raleigh for some time. When he returned he did find work on some of his better-known buildings. While he was working on the Pullen Building in 1884, he met his wife-to-be, Cherokee Indian Rachel Blythe. The couple had to leave North Carolina to get married, since interracial marriages were illegal in North Carolina at the time.

A few years later, in 1896, Bauer's carriage was struck by a train. He survived, but the trauma gave him continuing psychological issues which ruined his reputation. After Rachel died in 1897, his mental health grew even worse. He constructed an elaborate tombstone for her based on a Grecian temple. Shortly after completing this last project, Bauer committed suicide by shooting himself in the head.

== Works (not a comprehensive list) ==
- Church of the Saviour and Cemetery, jct. of Church and Calhoun Sts. Jackson, North Carolina (Bauer, Adolphus Gustavus), NRHP-listed
- The Academy of Music
- North Carolina Executive Mansion, 210 N. Blount St. Raleigh, NC (Bauer, Gustavus Adolphus), NRHP-listed
- The Pullen Building
- Baptist Female University
- North Carolina School for the Deaf: Main Building, U.S. 64 and Fleming Dr. Morganton, North Carolina (Bauer, Adolphus Gustavus), NRHP-listed
- NC Department of Labor Building
- First Presbyterian Church (Raleigh, North Carolina)
