= Strauss chandelier =

Crystal chandelier in North Carolina, US

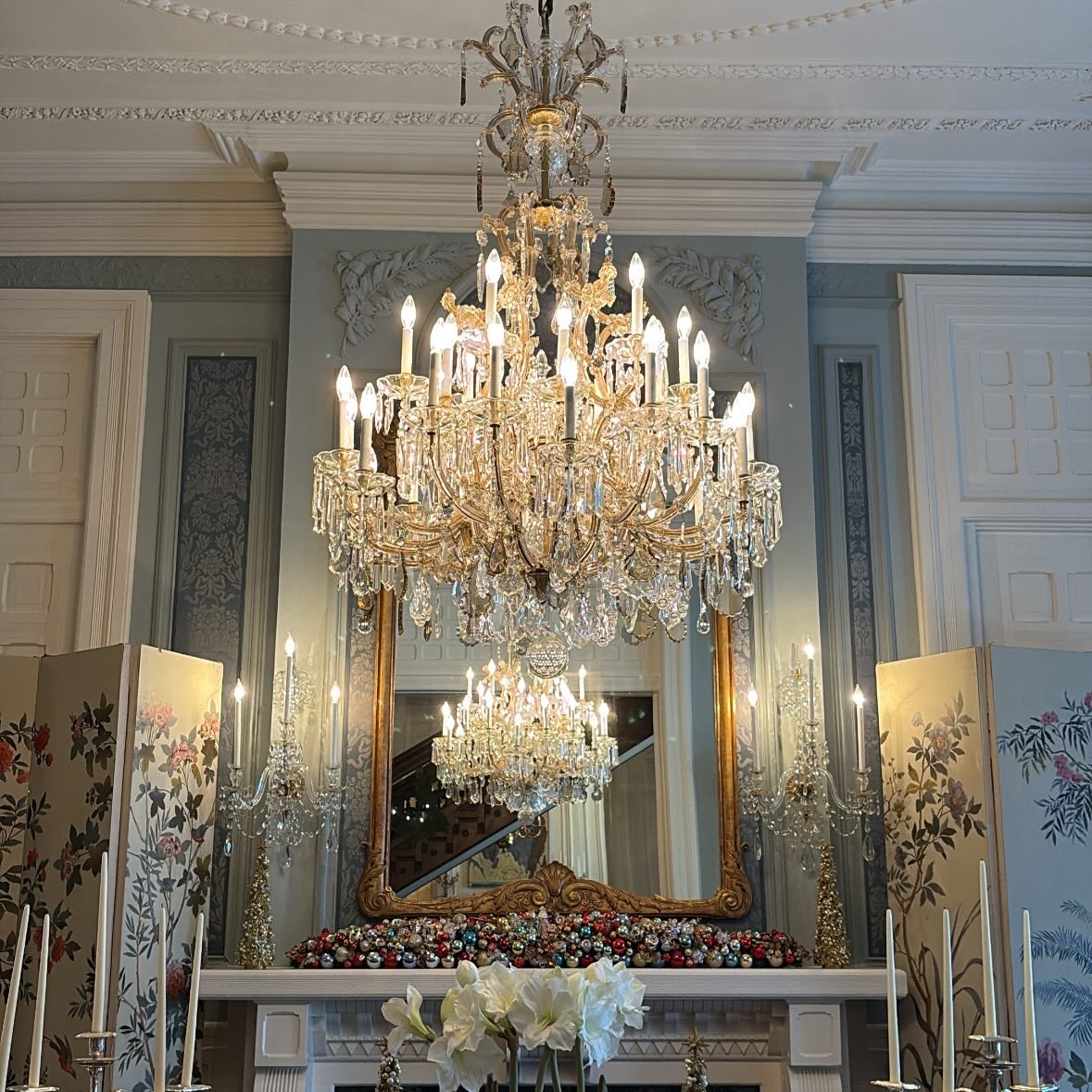
- The chandelier in 2025
- Year: c. 1880
- Type: Baroque
- Medium: Cut glass
- Location: North Carolina Executive Mansion Raleigh, North Carolina, U.S.
- Owner: Strauss family (former); Horowitz family (former); State of North Carolina (current)

The Strauss chandelier is a 19th-century Maria Theresa-style crystal chandelier that hangs in the state dining room of the North Carolina Executive Mansion in Raleigh, North Carolina. It was donated to the State of North Carolina by Karoline Strauss Horowitz, a Holocaust survivor, in the 1960s. The chandelier belonged to Horowitz's parents, Gustav Strauss and Selma Strauss, who were killed during the Holocaust in Germany. It was installed in the mansion under the direction of First Lady Jeanelle C. Moore circa 1968.

== History ==
The origin of the chandelier is unknown, but antique experts believe that the baroque Maria Theresa-style chandelier was possibly one of the first electrified crystal fixtures created in the 1880s by J. & L. Lobmeyr in Vienna. It hung in a large house in Barmen, the home of Gustav Strauss and Selma Strauss, wealthy Jewish merchants in Germany who later died in Nazi concentration camps during the Holocaust.

The Strauss's daughter, Karoline Strauss Horowitz, fled to the Netherlands from her home in the Free City of Danzig with her husband, Salo Horowitz, and their son, Robert Horowitz. From there, in March 1942, they made their way through Belgium, Occupied France, Vichy France, Spain, and Portugal before boarding a ship to Dutch Guiana. By 1944, the family had settled in Murphy, North Carolina but they later moved to Asheville. Karoline Horowitz and her two brothers contacted a neighbor back in Europe to assist them in recovering some of their parents' belongings. The chandelier, among other family heirlooms, was sent to the United States.

Horowitz donated the chandelier to the State of North Carolina in the 1960s as a token of gratitude to North Carolinians for making them feel safe and welcomed upon arriving in the United States. North Carolina First Lady Jeanelle C. Moore accepted it on behalf of the state and, circa 1968, she had it installed in the state dining room of the North Carolina Executive Mansion in Raleigh.

In December 2023, Governor Roy Cooper and First Lady Kristin Cooper hosted "Lighting the Way," an event featuring an interview with Robert Horowitz. During the event, Cooper stated that "the Strauss chandelier and the lessons of their story will be shared with the thousands of people and hundreds of school groups who tour every year.”
