= Teena Piccione =

American Government Official

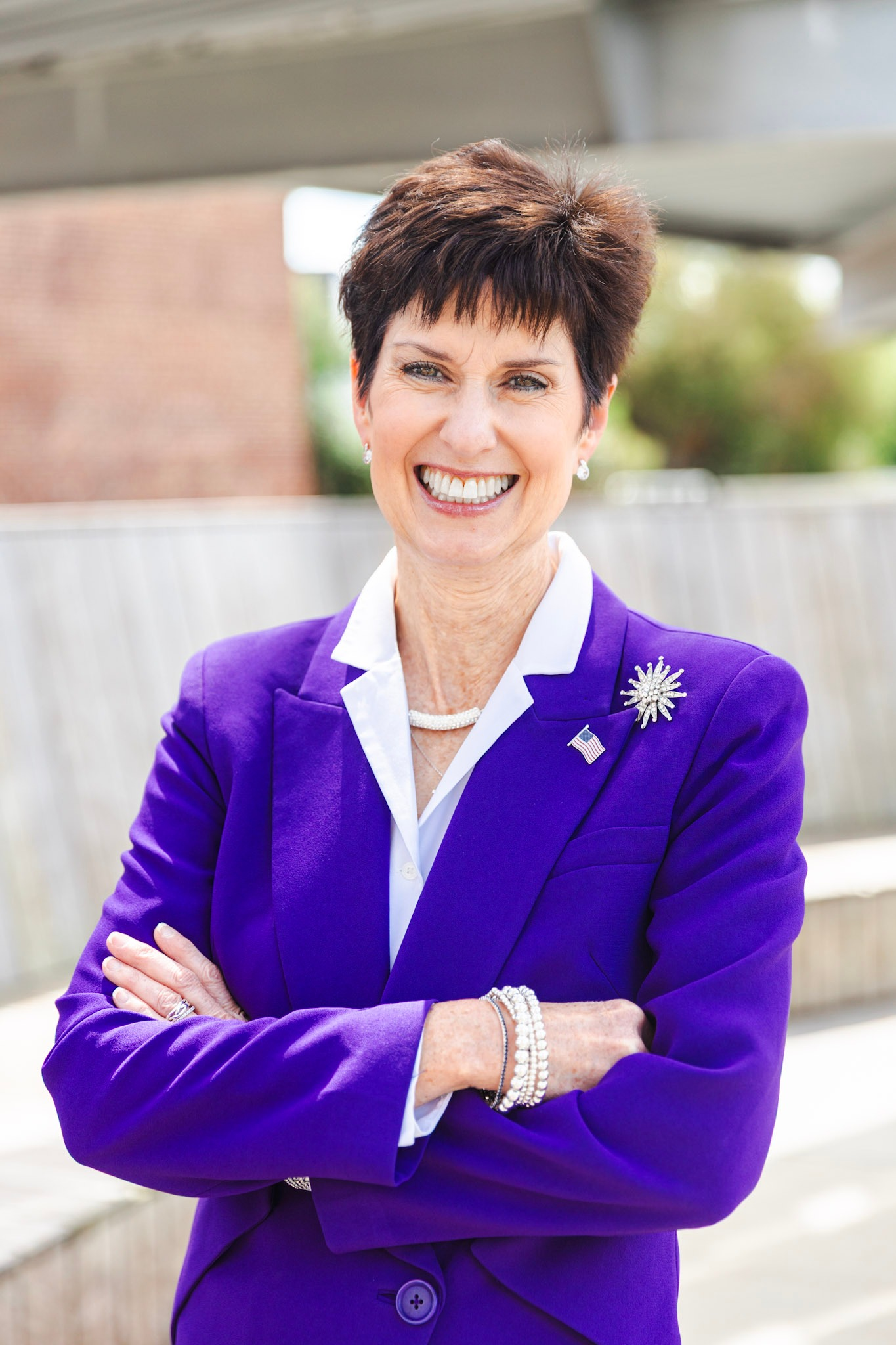
- Piccione in 2025

7th North Carolina Secretary of Information Technology
- In office January 3, 2025 – April 6, 2026
- Governor: Josh Stein
- Preceded by: James Weaver
- Succeeded by: Nate Denny

Personal details
- Education: Georgia State University; George Washington University
- Occupation: business executive

Teena W. Piccione is an American technology executive and former government official who served as Secretary and State Chief Information Officer (CIO) of the North Carolina Department of Information Technology (NCDIT). She was appointed to Governor Josh Stein's cabinet in January 2025 and confirmed by the North Carolina Senate in May 2025. Piccione previously held senior technology leadership roles at AT&T, Fidelity Investments, RTI International, and Google.

== Early life and education ==
Piccione holds a Bachelor of Arts degree in journalism from Georgia State University. She earned a Master's degree in Information Technology Project Management from George Washington University. According to RTI International, she has also completed an executive education program at Harvard University.

== Career ==
=== Private sector ===
==== AT&T ====
Piccione began her career at AT&T, where she held a series of technology and leadership positions. She served as a senior technical director, responsible for developing plans and budgets for information technology infrastructure and managing large-scale, high‑risk executive programs. She later became chief of staff, a role in which she handled immediate operational demands while coordinating long‑term strategic projects.

Piccione was subsequently promoted to assistant vice president for AT&T's big data strategy. In that capacity, she worked on the development of a data-focused incubator within the company, and she was involved in initiatives aimed at generating new revenue streams from data and analytics. She also played a role in the development of cybersecurity policies intended to protect data across the company's networked devices. In 2015, the InnoTech Conference named her IT Executive of the Year, and AT&T recognized her as a Champion of Diversity.

==== Fidelity Investments ====
In 2015, Piccione joined Fidelity Investments as senior vice president and chief operations officer. At Fidelity, she oversaw technology operations and initiatives intended to support collaboration and communication across business units and to align technology services with the company's broader business objectives.

==== RTI International ====
Piccione later became global chief information officer at RTI International, where she led a team responsible for information technology services, digital transformation, and innovation. Her work at RTI included efforts to modernize infrastructure and to adopt technology solutions in areas such as data, analytics, and artificial intelligence, in support of the organization's research and project portfolio.

==== Google ====
In 2020, Piccione joined Google as a managing director for Google Cloud. In that role, she worked with customers on cloud adoption and on approaches to streaming, connectivity, and collaboration across industries. She was later named global transformation and operations executive for Google's corporate global engineering teams, where she focused on organizational and technical transformation initiatives within the company.

=== State Government ===
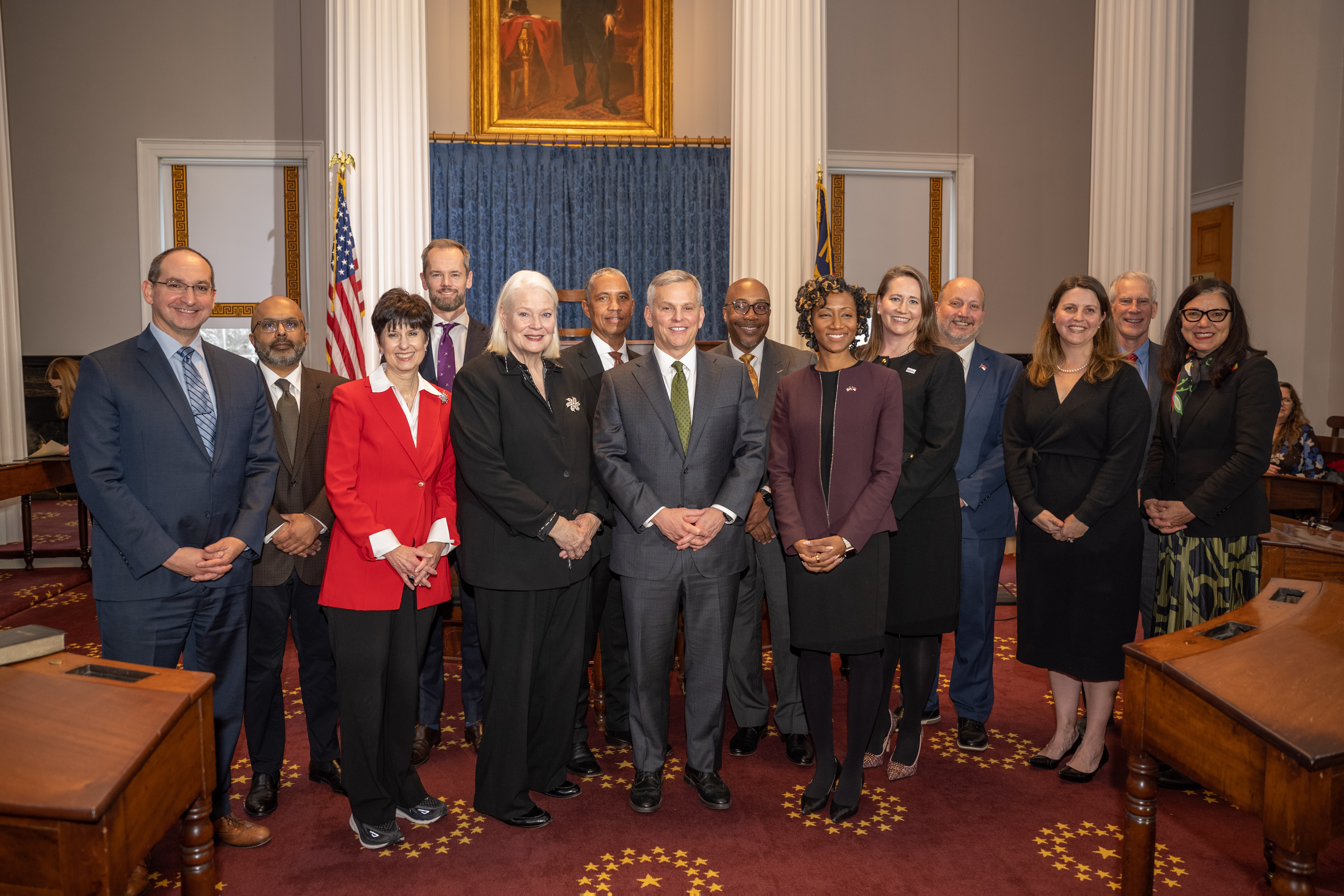
Piccione (third from left) with Governor Josh Stein and other members of the North Carolina Cabinet in 2025

Piccione was appointed Secretary of the North Carolina Department of Information Technology and State Chief Information Officer in January 2025 and was sworn in as a member of Governor Josh Stein's cabinet on January 6, 2025. The North Carolina Senate confirmed her appointment on May 22, 2025. She succeeded Jim Weaver, who retired from state service to take a position in the private sector.

As Secretary and State CIO, Piccione led NCDIT, which provides information technology services and strategy to North Carolina state agencies and supports statewide initiatives in cybersecurity, digital services, broadband, and data management. She oversaw statewide AI efforts and served as chair of the North Carolina 911 Board, the state Health Information Exchange (HIE) Board, and the state's AI Council. She left this role April 6, 2026 to return to the private sector.

==== Major initiatives ====
In July 2025, under Piccione's leadership, NCDIT announced a cybersecurity internship program developed in partnership with the Carolina Cyber Network and Fayetteville Technical Community College. The program is designed to provide students with practical cybersecurity experience and to help expand North Carolina's information technology workforce. Piccione signed the first-of-its-kind state-level agreement with Starlink to improve disaster-response communication networks in North Carolina, especially in areas where traditional infrastructure might be vulnerable. Modernization of core state government functions was also a priority during her tenure.

== Academic and professional affiliations ==
Piccione has been associated with High Point University's Access to Innovators program as an Innovator in Residence and data expert. In this role, she is part of a group of executives in residence who engage with students and faculty on topics related to career development, technology, and leadership.

== Awards and recognition ==
Piccione has received several professional awards and recognitions, including:

• IT Executive of the Year, InnoTech Conference (April 2015)

• Champion of Diversity, AT&T (May 2015)

• Women to Watch in STEM, Diversity Journal (May 2017)

• Woman Worth Watching, Diversity Journal (June 2017)

• Top 50 CIOs of the Year, National Diversity Council (January 2020)

• Mentor of the Year, TechLX (January 2023)

• Top 100 Innovator of the Year, Top 100 (January 2025)

== Media and coverage ==
Piccione has been profiled and cited in a variety of media and professional publications. Executive coach and author Christina Curtis included her among the leaders featured in the book Choosing Greatness, which discusses approaches to decision‑making and performance in business environments.

On February 25, 2025, Piccione appeared on the PBS program Side by Side with Nido Qubein, where she discussed her decision to leave Google to become North Carolina's chief information officer, as well as broader issues related to technology leadership and the role of artificial intelligence in government.

== See also ==
- North Carolina Department of Information Technology
