= Governor of North Carolina =

Head of government of the U.S. state of North Carolina

- Gubernatorial seal

- Flag of North Carolina

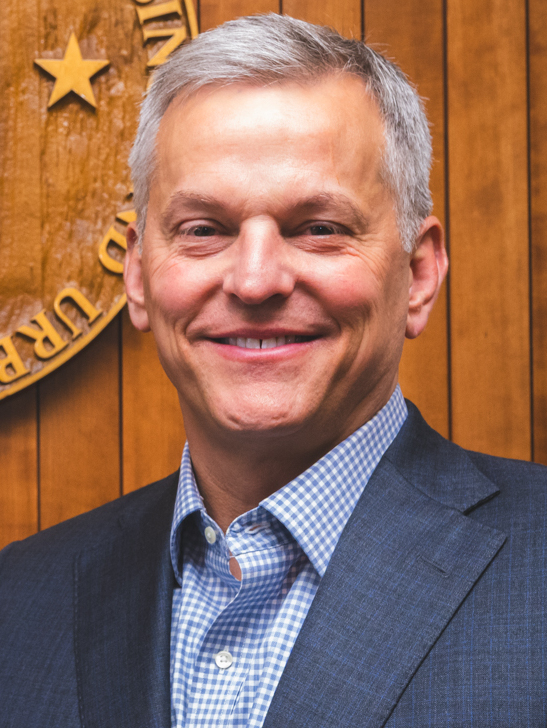
- Incumbent; Josh Stein since January 1, 2025
- Government of North Carolina
- Style: Governor (informal); The Honorable (formal); His Excellency (formal)
- Type: Chief executive; Head of government; Commander-in-chief
- Member of: Council of State
- Residence: Executive Mansion (primary); Western Residence (secondary); Governor's Palace (former)
- Seat: Raleigh, North Carolina
- Term length: Four years, renewable once consecutively
- Constituting instrument: Constitution of North Carolina (1776)
- Formation: January 16, 1777 (249 years ago)
- First holder: Richard Caswell
- Succession: Line of succession
- Deputy: Lieutenant Governor of North Carolina
- Salary: US$203,073 per year (2025)
- Website: Official website

The governor of North Carolina is the head of government of the U.S. state of North Carolina. Seventy-five people have held the office since the first state governor, Richard Caswell, took office in 1777. The governor serves a term of four years and chairs the collective body of the state's elected executive officials, the Council of State. The governor's powers and responsibilities are prescribed by the state constitution and by law. They serve as the North Carolina's chief executive and are tasked by the constitution with faithfully carrying out the laws of the state. They are ex officio commander in chief of the North Carolina National Guard and director of the state budget. The office has some powers of appointment of executive branch officials, some judges, and members of boards and commissions. Governors are also empowered to grant pardons and veto legislation.

Historically, North Carolina has had a weak governor with limited authority. Unlike most of their counterparts in the United States, the North Carolina governor lacks line-item veto power, while additional executive authority is vested in other elected officials on the Council of State. While the state has grown increasingly politically competitive since the mid-20th century, Republicans have had difficulty in winning gubernatorial elections in North Carolina, and the office has usually remained in Democratic hands. The current governor, Democrat Josh Stein, took office on January 1, 2025.

== History ==
=== Colonial antecedent ===
The office of governor is the oldest public office in the state of North Carolina. Historians trace its origins to the appointment of Ralph Lane as the governor of the Roanoke Colony in 1585. From 1622 to 1731, the Province of Carolina/Province of North Carolina had governors appointed by the colony's lords proprietors. (Note: From 1692 to 1712 there existed one Province of Carolina under colonial government. The governor resided in Charleston while a deputy governor resided in the area that eventually became North Carolina.) From then until 1774, the governors were chosen by the British Crown. The governors during these times were politically weak executives and generally conformed to the wishes of their appointers. They were aided in the execution of their office by the Governor's Council, an advisory board of appointed officials that also collectively served as the upper house in the North Carolina General Assembly. After 1731, the councilors were chosen by the Privy Council and were responsible to the British King, further diluting the governor's authority.

During the period of royal control after 1731, North Carolina's governors were issued sets of secret instructions from the Privy Council's Board of Trade. The directives were binding upon the governor and dealt with nearly all aspects of colonial government. As they were produced by officials largely ignorant of the political situation in the colony and meant to ensure greater direct control over the territory, the instructions caused tensions between the governor and the General Assembly. The assembly controlled the colony's finances and used this as leverage by withholding salaries and appropriations, sometimes forcing the governors to compromise and disregard some of the Board of Trade's instructions. Frequent tensions between Governor Josiah Martin—a firm supporter of the instructions—and the Assembly in the 1770s led the latter to establish a committee of correspondence and accelerated the colony's break with Great Britain.

=== Formation and antebellum period ===
The state of North Carolina's first constitution in 1776—adopted by the Fifth Provincial Congress—provided for a governor to be elected by a joint vote of both houses of the General Assembly to serve a one-year term. They were limited to serving no more than three terms within a six-year period. Candidates had to be at least 30 years old, had to have lived in the state for five years, and own at least £1,000 worth of land. The constitution also provided for a legislatively-determined Council of State to "advise the Governor in the execution of his office". From its inception, the office of governor in North Carolina was weak in its powers, largely restricted out of fear of the actions taken by British colonial governors. In practice, the Council of State limited the governor's executive authority, as sometimes the governor was required to get their approval before taking a course of action. The governor was given the power to issue pardons and reprieves and was made commander-in-chief of the state's military forces "for the time being". They had no power to make executive appointments except during legislative recesses and with the advice of the council.

The Fifth Provincial Congress elected Richard Caswell to serve as the independent state's first governor pending legislative elections and the formation of the General Assembly. Caswell was sworn in on January 16, 1777. The General Assembly reelected him to the role at its first session in April. In 1835, the constitution was amended to allow for the popular election of the governor to a two-year term, thus giving the office more political independence from the legislature. The holder of the office was restricted to no more than two terms within a six-year period. Edward Bishop Dudley became the first popularly-elected governor.

=== 1868 constitution ===
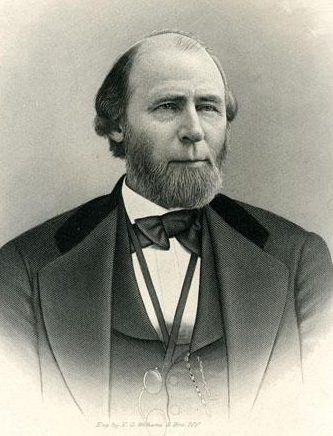
William Woods Holden is the only North Carolina governor to have been impeached and removed from office.

In 1868, North Carolina ratified a new constitution which extended the governor's term of office to four years but limited the holder to one term. Under the 1868 constitution, the governor's executive power was derived from the following provision: "The executive department shall consist of a governor, in whom shall be invested the supreme executive power of the State." The new constitution also granted the governor appointive powers, allowing them to appoint "all officers whose offices are established by this Constitution, or which shall be created by law, and whose appointments are not otherwise provided for" with the advice and consent of the Senate. The document also affirmed the governor's power to grant pardons, reprieves, and commutations. Over time, this was interpreted to included paroles. The Council of State was revised to include several other popularly-elected executive officials serving ex officio. Under the constitution, the governor called and presided over the council's meetings but was not a formal member of the body.

In 1871, Governor William Woods Holden was impeached and removed from office. Holden was the first governor in the United States to ever be removed in such a fashion and is the only North Carolina governor to have ever been impeached. In 1875, the state held a convention which ratified several amendments to the constitution, including an alteration which removed the governor's ability to appoint officials who derived their offices' existence from state statutes. The governor was left with de jure responsibility over appointments for constitutional officers who did not have their appointments otherwise provided for, but as no such officers existed, the changes essentially stripped governors of their appointive abilities. Following litigation in state courts over contested appointive jurisdiction in the late 19th century and early 20th century, several state governors called for the restoration of their appointive powers.

=== Constitutional and legislative enhancements ===
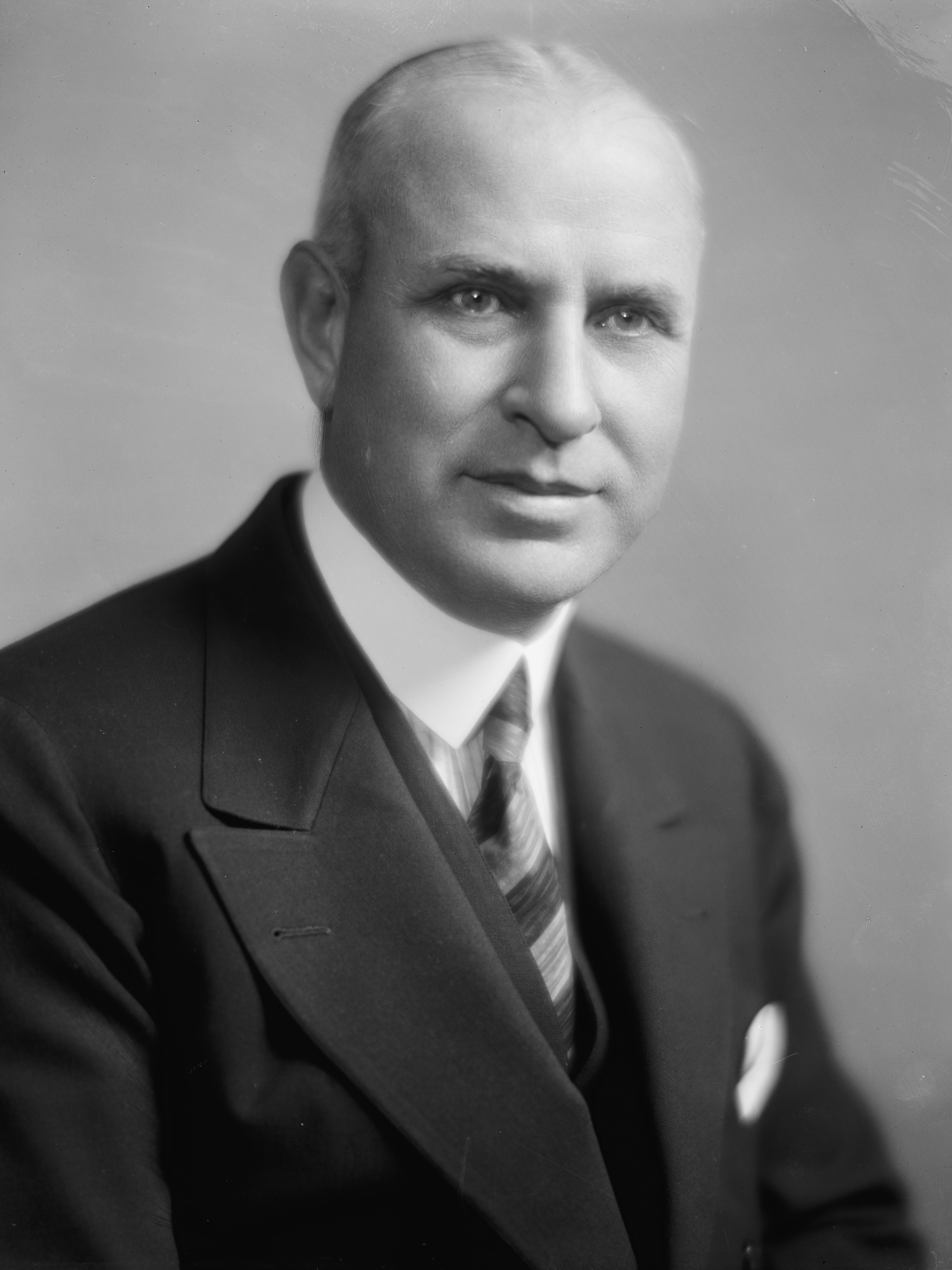
The power of the governorship was strengthened during the tenure of O. Max Gardner.

In 1925, the Executive Budget Act was passed, designating the governor as the director of the state budget. During the tenure of Governor O. Max Gardner from 1929 to 1933, various reforms led to the centralization of governmental services and the creation of appointive offices, thus increasing the authority and importance of the governorship. In 1933 the General Assembly approved a referendum to consider amending the constitution to grant the governor veto power over legislation, but the amendment effort failed due to technical concerns. In 1955, per constitutional amendment, parole authority was stripped from the governor and granted to an independent state parole board.

In the 1950s and 1960s, several governors and other observers advocated constitutional reforms, including changes which would enhance governors' executive authority. These efforts culminated in legislative debates in 1970 and the ratification of a new constitution the following year. The new constitution of 1971 stipulated that "The executive power of the State shall be invested in the Governor", making the official unambiguously the chief executive of the state. The constitution also affirmed the governor's role as the director of the state budget and made them a formal ex officio member of the Council of State. The state's budget office was directly incorporated into the office of the governor in 1979.

In 1977, the North Carolina constitution was amended, allowing governors to pursue re-election to a consecutive four-year term in office. This amendment strengthened the political authority of the office. Another amendment gave the governor discretion to curtail state spending in the event it was necessary to maintain balance with collected revenues. Following a 1995 referendum resulting in a constitutional amendment effective the subsequent year, the governor was granted veto power, becoming the last governor in the country to be given this power. Mike Easley became the first North Carolina governor to veto legislation after rejecting a bill in 2002. While institutional enhancements increased the formal power of the governorship over the course of the 20th century, this was counteracted by a corresponding rise in the legislature's growing willingness to assert its separate desires in state policy. In 2018, the General Assembly significantly curtailed the number of appointments which could be made by the governor, dropping appointive roles from about 1,500 to 300. The incumbent governor is Josh Stein, a Democrat who assumed office on January 1, 2025.

== Election ==
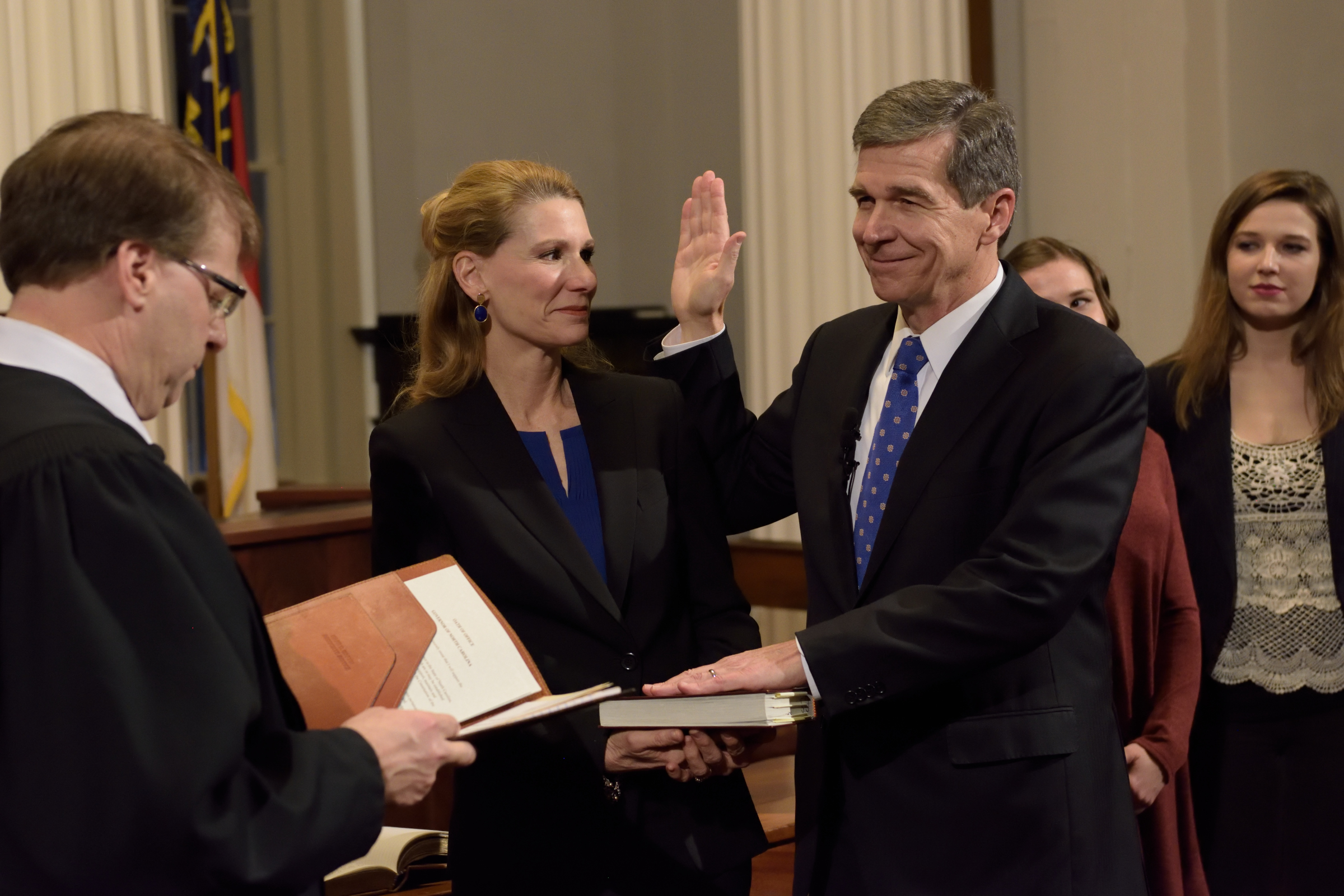
Governor Roy Cooper delivering his oath of office, 2017

As with other state officials, only registered voters in North Carolina are eligible to be elected governor. Unlike most other candidates for statewide executive office, who must be at least 21 years of age, any potential governor must be at least 30 years of age. They must also have been a citizen of the United States for at least five years and a resident of North Carolina for at least two years preceding election. The governor is elected every four years in increments proceeding from the year 1972. They serve for a four-year term and continue in office until their successor has sworn in. Contested elections for the office of governor are resolved by a majority vote of the General Assembly.

The governor's term of office begins on January 1 of the year following their election, but they may not exercise the duties of the office until delivering and undersigning the oath or affirmation of office before a justice of the North Carolina Supreme Court. The oath, which is identical for all state officials, is prescribed by the Article VI Section 7 of the constitution. Since 1877, new governors have often sworn their oaths in public inaugural ceremonies which are accompanied by celebratory balls and parades. They typically receive the Great Seal of the State North Carolina from the outgoing incumbent in a private meeting. The governor is limited to serving two consecutive terms in office, with no limits on nonconsecutive terms. In the event the governor-elect fails to qualify for their office, the lieutenant governor-elect becomes governor. The lieutenant governor is elected at the same time as the governor but on their own ticket.

== Powers and duties ==
=== Executive authority and responsibilities ===
The powers and duties of the governor of North Carolina are derived from the Constitution of North Carolina and state statutes. The governor is the chief executive of the state and is tasked by the constitution with faithfully carrying out the laws of the state. The governor is empowered to request agency heads in state government to report to them in writing on subjects relating to executive duties. They are authorized by the constitution to reorganize executive agencies by executive order submitted to the General Assembly, which have "the force of law" unless expressly disapproved by the assembly. The constitution also makes them ex officio commander in chief of the North Carolina National Guard—except when the guard is placed into federal service—and authorizes them to call it into service "to execute the law". They are empowered to grant pardons and commutations to convicted criminals and serve as the state's chief representative in intergovernmental matters. They are responsible for reviewing extradition requests from other states and issuing a governor's warrant to detain persons for extradition. The constitution makes the governor the director of the state budget. In this capacity, the governor has the responsibility of monitoring revenue and expenditures to ensure the state maintains a balanced budget and preparing budget recommendations for the General Assembly, which can disregard the proposals in creating the state budget. The governor also administers grants and loans provided by the federal government to the state.

The office has powers of appointment with regards to executive branch officials, some judges, and members of boards and commissions. As of 2024, the governor is responsible for 300 appointments. Most executive appointments are not subject to legislative consent and many appointees serve at the pleasure of the governor. Some appointments to major state boards, including the State Board of Education and the North Carolina Utilities Commission, require confirmation from either one or both houses of the General Assembly. The governor is responsible for appointing the secretaries of the North Carolina Cabinet departments, comprising those responsible for administration, commerce, environmental quality, health and human resources, information technology, military and veterans affairs, natural and cultural resources, public safety, revenue, and transportation. Cabinet secretaries are subject to confirmation from the State Senate. The governor is empowered to appoint interim officials to any vacant Council of State offices aside from the lieutenant governor without legislative assent pending the next state legislative election. They also may fill vacant judicial offices unless otherwise directed by law. Some appointments to state boards are reserved for other state officials, and the governor's ability to remove officials has been limited by courts. The constitution also allows the governor to devolve some responsibilities upon the lieutenant governor at their discretion.

=== Legislative authority and responsibilities ===
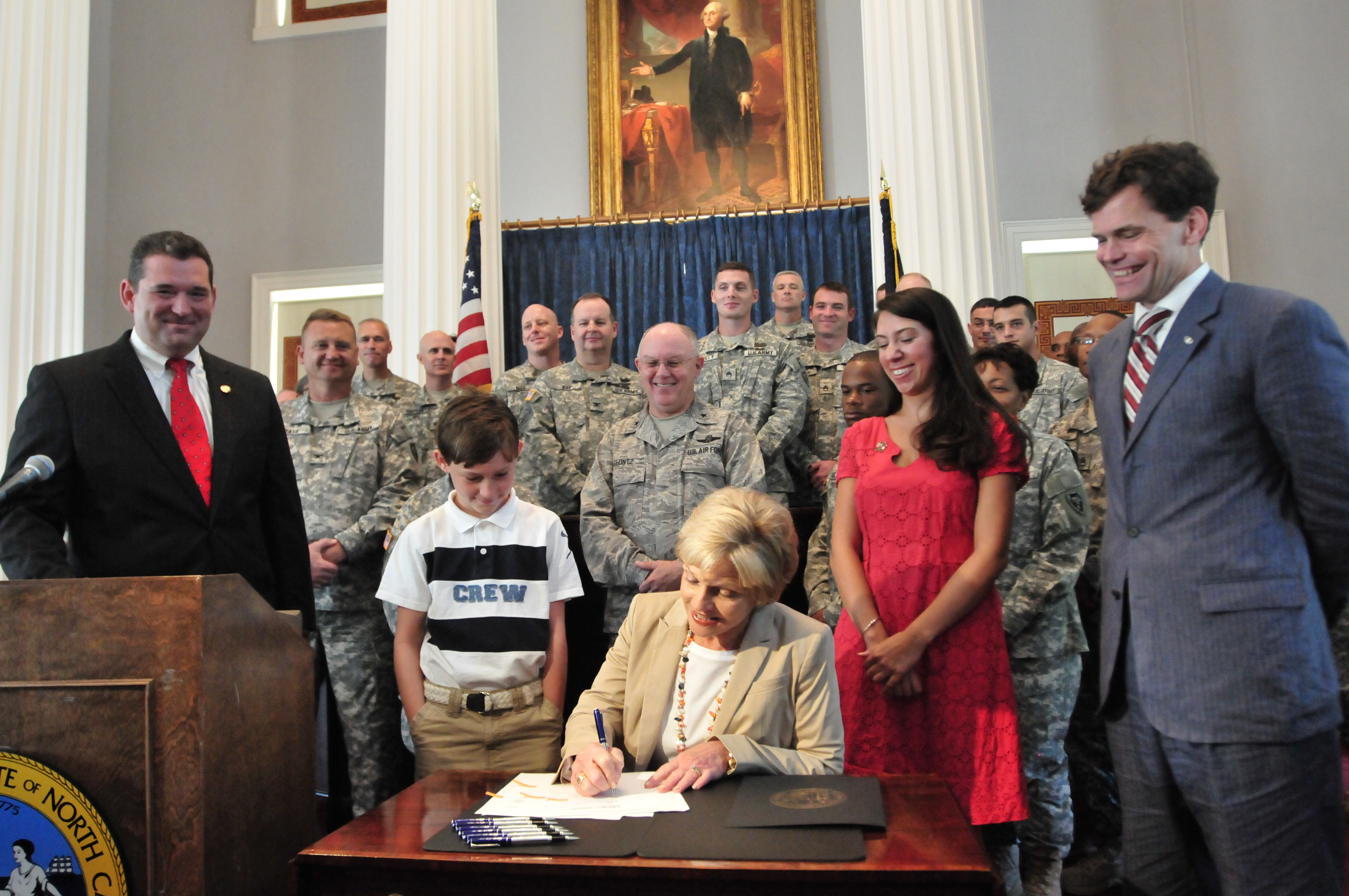
Governor Bev Perdue signing a bill into law, 2011

The governor is constitutionally obligated to "give the General Assembly information of the affairs of the State and recommend to their consideration such measures as he shall deem expedient". Governors traditionally fulfill this requirement with a "State of the State" speech delivered during the legislature's opening session, though they can also communicate this information through separate special messages. The governor signs bills passed by the General Assembly of which they approve into law and are empowered to veto bills of which they disapprove. A veto can be overridden by a three-fifths majority vote of the assembly. Legislation can also take effect without the governor's signature if they chose not to veto it. The governor may call the General Assembly into extraordinary session after consulting the Council of State and is required to convene the assembly in specific circumstances to review vetoed legislation.

=== Other duties ===
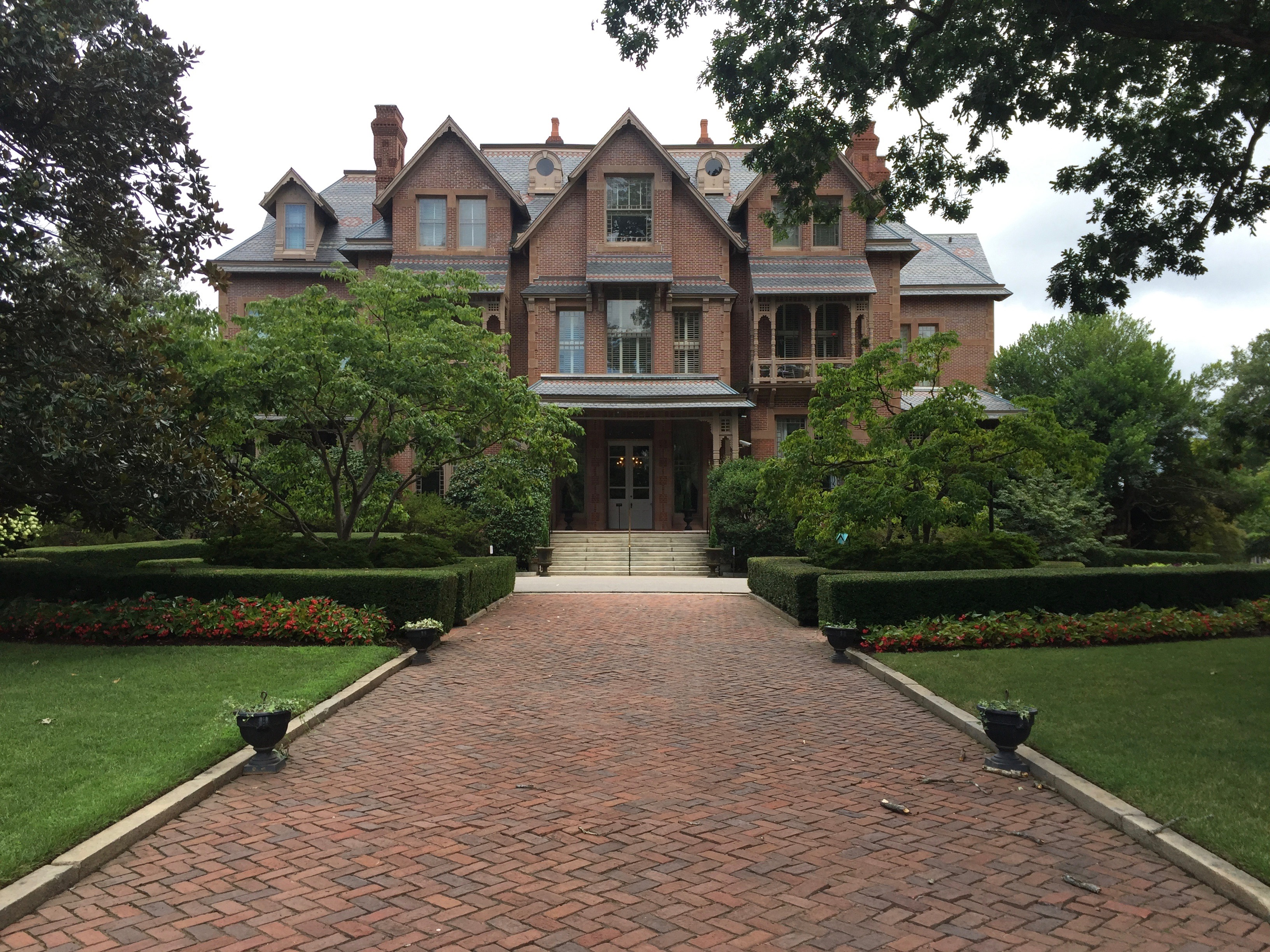
The Executive Mansion is the official residence of the governor.

The governor is one of 10 constitutionally-designated members of the Council of State, a collection of elected state executives, and chairs its meetings. The body has minimal constitutional duties, with its most significant responsibilities arising from statute, including approving the governor's acquisitions and disposals of state property. The governor is tasked by the constitution with keeping the Great Seal of the State North Carolina. The constitution empowers the governor to permit the state or a local government to incur a debt without a referendum in the event of an emergency threat to public health or safety.

The governor is constitutionally required to live at the seat of state government. The Governor's Palace in Raleigh served as the official residence from 1816 until the end of the Civil War in 1865. Since 1891, the Executive Mansion in Raleigh has served as the official residence of the governor of North Carolina and their family. The Governor's Western Residence in Asheville serves as their secondary residence when visiting the western part of the state. Governors and their immediate family—called the "first family" during the executive's tenure—serve as symbolic leaders for the state. As the ceremonial head of the state, the governor often attends official events and performs formal functions on behalf of the state, such as meeting with important persons and leading ribbon-cutting ceremonies.

== Capacity, removal, and succession ==
In the event of the governor's absence from North Carolina, or their physical or mental incapacity, the lieutenant governor is tasked with serving as "Acting Governor". (Note: There is little case law in North Carolina concerning the lieutenant governor's role when the governor is absent from the state. Legal analysts disagree over the applicability of succession in the circumstances of travel in recent years, as the governor may be able to maintain contact their subordinates while away from the state.) In the event of the governor's death, resignation, or removal, the lieutenant governor or whoever next available in the line of succession shall assume the governorship to complete the full term to which the original governor was elected. Constitutionally, physical incapacity can only be determined by the governor themselves; they may write to the North Carolina Attorney General that they are physically incapable of performing their duties. They can resume their duties after informing the attorney general that they are physically capable. The Council of State has the ability by majority vote to call the General Assembly into an extraordinary session to consider the governor's mental capacity. The General Assembly can declare the governor mentally incapable with a two-thirds majority vote on a joint resolution. The assembly is required to give the governor notice of this consideration and allow them to express their own opinion on their capacity before a vote.

Aside from states of mental or physical incapacity, the only other constitutional reason to remove the governor is their commission of an impeachable offense. In the event that the governor is impeached by the North Carolina House of Representatives, the chief justice of the North Carolina Supreme Court presides over the court of impeachment. The court is composed of the State Senate, with a majority of its members serving as a quorum. While the court is engaged in its proceedings, the impeached governor is temporarily suspended from their duties. A two-thirds affirmative vote of the senators present constitutes a conviction and thus removal and future disqualification from holding office.

North Carolina's line of gubernatorial succession is by enumerated in Article III, Section 3 of the Constitution of North Carolina and General Statutes Section 147.11.1. The line of succession passes sequentially as follows: first to the Lieutenant Governor, then the President pro tempore of the Senate, then the Speaker of the House of Representatives, then the Secretary of State, then the State Auditor, then the State Treasurer, then the Superintendent of Public Instruction, then the Attorney General, then the Commissioner of Agriculture, then the Commissioner of Labor, and finally the Commissioner of Insurance.

== Office structure ==
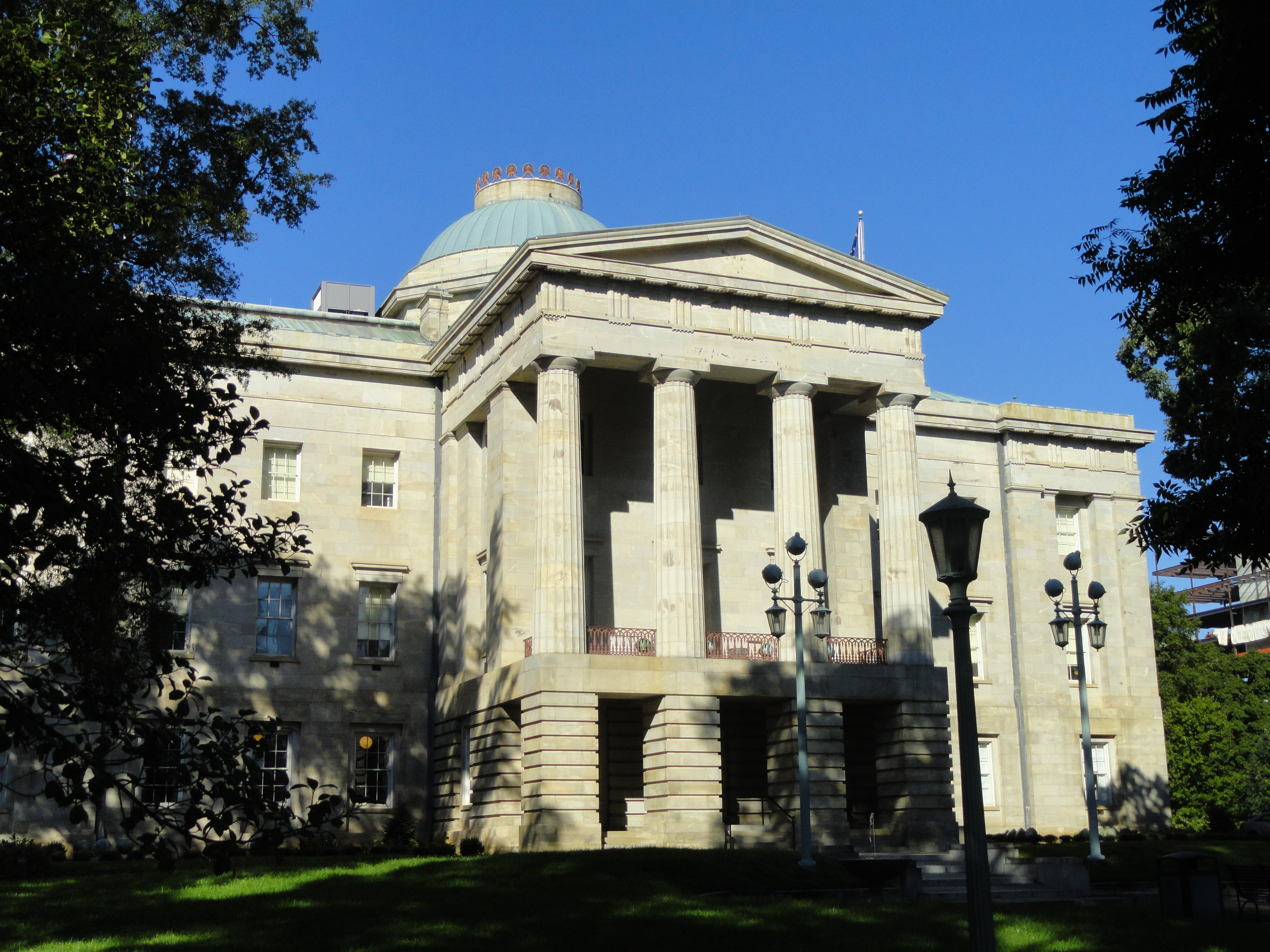
The governor's office is in the North Carolina State Capitol.

The governor's office is in the State Capitol, with additional office space located in the Administration Building. The offices in the Administration Building are scheduled to be temporarily relocated to the Albemarle Building before a new facility is erected adjacent to the governor's mansion. Regional offices are located in New Bern and Asheville to reach local governments and residents in the eastern and western portions of the state, respectively. The Asheville office also oversees management of the governor's western residence. Another office is maintained in Washington D.C. to serve as a liaison between North Carolina's government and both the state's congressional delegation and the federal government. The governor is provided with a security detail supplied by the North Carolina Highway Patrol. As with all Council of State officers, the governor's salary is fixed by the General Assembly and cannot be reduced during their term of office. As of 2025, the governor's annual salary is $203,073.

The secretaries which lead executive departments under the governor's purview collectively form the state cabinet. There are 11 cabinet-level departments: Administration, Adult Correction, Commerce, Environmental Quality, Health and Human Services, Information Technology, Military and Veterans Affairs, Natural and Cultural Resources, Public Safety, Revenue, and Transportation. The governor's office employs a senior staff, which assist the governor in their management of the cabinet and offer advice in legislative matters. As of January 2025, the governor's office retains 85 employees under the terms of the State Human Resources Act. The governor appoints a legal counsel who advises the governor, their cabinet, and the Council of State. The counsel also provides advice regarding legal policy matters and investigates the merits of pardons and commutations. Requests for pardons and commutations are reviewed by the Clemency Office.

The Office of State Budget and Management prepares the state budget and advises the governor on budgetary affairs. The Boards and Commissions Office advises the governor on their appointments. The Communications Office employs spokespersons for the governor and prepares press releases, speeches, and public events for them. The Policy Office crafts and considers the governors' main executive and legislative policy goals. The Education Policy Office does the same with a focus on educational matters. The Office of Constituent Services fields citizen inquires and correspondence. The Office of Citizen and Faith Outreach handles matters concerning minority groups and religion. The Legislative Affairs Office acts as a liaison between the governor and the General Assembly and reports on the progression of legislation. The Governmental Relations Office serves as a liaison between the state government, local governments, and the federal government.

== Political dynamics ==
=== Political role ===
Governors usually informally serve as the state leader of whatever political party to which they belong. They often have the ability to influence the selection of other party leaders, offer endorsements to candidates, and serve as a spokesman for their organization. As a prominent elected official, the governor enjoys media attention and high levels of public recognition and wields agenda-setting authority and the ability to influence public opinion.

=== Trends in officeholders ===
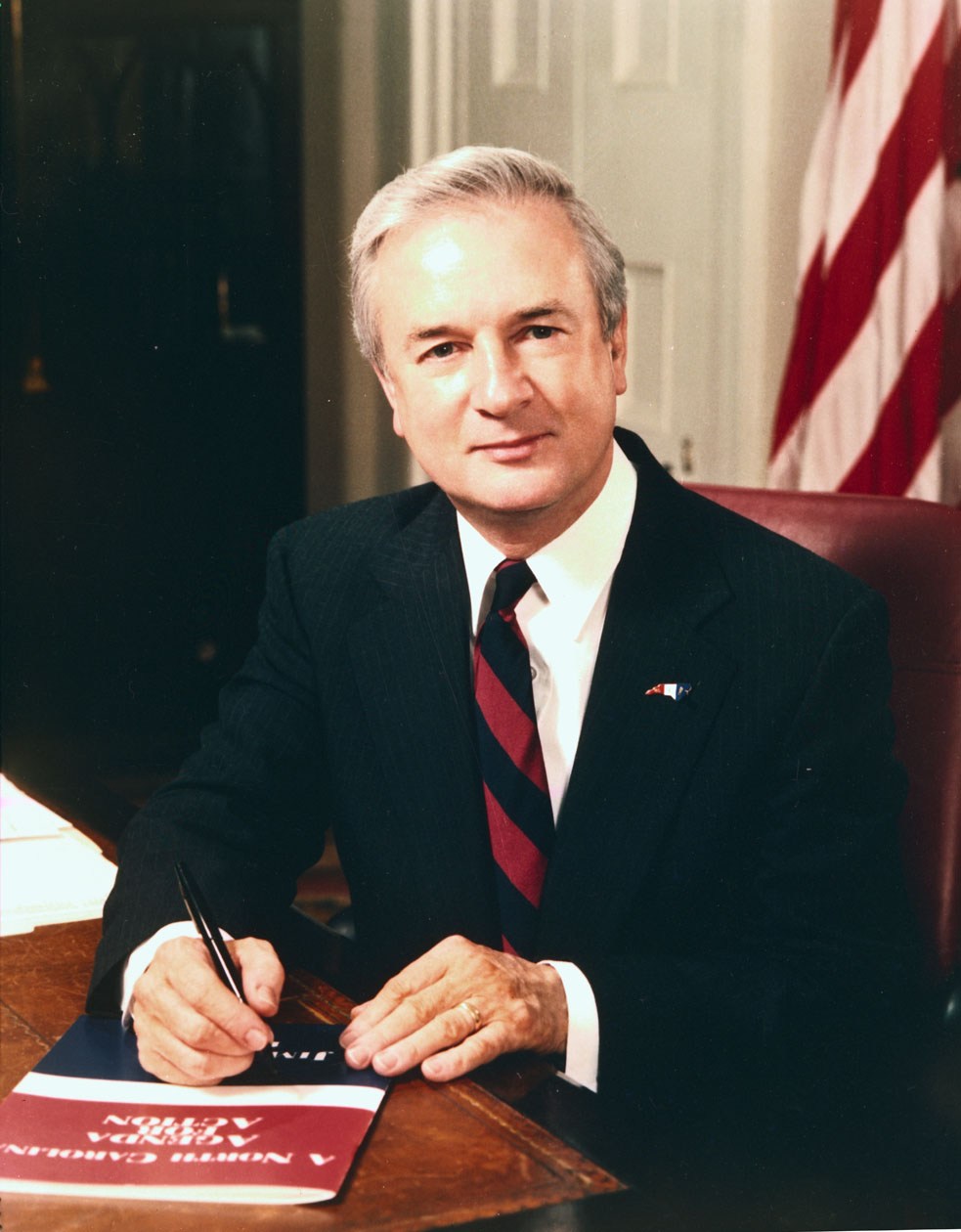
Jim Hunt was the state's longest-serving governor.

Between 1877 and 1972 all of North Carolina's governors were Democrats, with the exception of Republican Daniel L. Russell, who won a single term to office in 1896. Territorial considerations effected gubernatorial choices; from 1836 until 1944, governors came from the eastern or western portion of the state in about even numbers. This practice was strategically deployed as an informal rotation agreement with every new election by the Democratic Party from 1877 (Russell excepted) until the 1940s, when the territorial cohesion of the dominant Democratic intra-party faction in state politics broke down. As Republican strength grew in North Carolina after 1950, the state's gubernatorial elections became increasingly competitive. In 1972, James Holshouser was elected as the state's first Republican governor of the 20th century. Even so, Republicans have still had difficulty in winning gubernatorial elections in North Carolina, and the office has usually remained in Democratic hands; since Russell's departure in 1901, 23 Democrats and three Republicans have been elected to gubernatorial office. Beginning in the latter half of the 20th century, Democratic gubernatorial candidates have regularly outperformed their presidential counterparts. Republican gubernatorial candidates have generally attempted to link their efforts with Republican presidential campaigns, while Democratic candidates have usually placed more distance between themselves and their associated presidential contenders.

The vast majority of people who have been elected Governor of North Carolina have been male, born and raised in a rural North Carolinian environment, about 50 years of age, politically experienced, attorneys, and college educated. Most have been white Christians. Bev Perdue, elected in 2008, was the first woman to serve as governor of North Carolina. Stein is the first Jew to serve as governor. As in other states, incumbents tend to win reelection. Jim Hunt was the state's longest-serving governor with four terms in office, serving from 1977 to 1985 and 1993 to 2001.

=== Weaknesses of powers ===
North Carolina's governor has less overall institutional power compared to governors in other states. Their veto power is weaker than that of most of their contemporaries. It can be overridden by a three-fifths majority legislative vote, slimmer than the two-thirds majority usually required in most states. Unlike governors in most states, the North Carolina governor does not have line-item veto power. They are also prohibited from vetoing joint resolutions of the legislature, local bills, and amendments to the state and federal constitutions. The separate election of other state executive officials on the Council of State and their control over executive affairs within their own jurisdictions, as well as the General Assembly's ability to provide for some appointments to state offices, draws authority away from the governorship. By law, the governor requires the council's approval for certain acquisitions and disposals of state property. Increasing two-party competitiveness in North Carolina from the 1970s onward and the occurrence of divided government—when the party which controls the legislature is different from that of the governor's affiliation—have also weakened the chief executive's political effectiveness.

== Timeline ==
Timeline of North Carolina governors

== Lists ==
- List of colonial governors of North Carolina
- List of governors of the Province of North Carolina
- List of governors of North Carolina
- List of first ladies and gentlemen of North Carolina

== Sources ==
- Allen, Arch T. III (1999). "A Study in Separation of Powers: Executive Power in North Carolina". North Carolina Law Review. 77 (6): 2049–2122.
- Cheney, John L. Jr., ed. (1981). North Carolina Government, 1585-1979: A Narrative and Statistical History (revised ed.). Raleigh: North Carolina Secretary of State. OCLC 1290270510.
- Coates, Albert (August 1948). "East is East and West is West -- But Which is Which?". Popular Government. Vol. 14, no. 8. University of North Carolina Institute of Government. pp. 7, 16.
- Cochrane, Augustus B. III (2001). Democracy Heading South: National Politics in the Shadow of Dixie. Lawrence: University Press of Kansas. ISBN 9780700610891.
- Cooper, Christopher A. (2024). Anatomy of a Purple State : A North Carolina Politics Primer. Chapel Hill: The University of North Carolina Press. ISBN 9781469681719.
- Cooper, Christopher A.; Knotts, H. Gibbs, eds. (2012). The New Politics of North Carolina. Chapel Hill: The University of North Carolina Press. ISBN 978-1-4696-0658-3.
- Damore, David F.; Lang, Robert E.; Danielsen, Karen A. (2020). Blue Metros, Red States: The Shifting Urban-Rural Divide in America's Swing States. Brookings Institution Press. ISBN 978-0-8157-3848-0.
- Fleer, Jack (2007). Governors Speak. University Press of America. ISBN 978-0-7618-3564-6.
- Gerber, Scott D. (September 2009). "The Origins of an Independent Judiciary in North Carolina, 1663-1787". North Carolina Law Review. 87 (6): 1771–1818.
- Guillory, Ferrel (June 1988). "The Council of State and North Carolina's Long Ballot: A Tradition Hard to Change" (PDF). N.C. Insight. N.C. Center for Public Policy Research. pp. 40–44.
- Mobley, Joe A. (2016). North Carolina Governor Richard Caswell: Founding Father and Revolutionary Hero. Arcadia Publishing. ISBN 978-1-62585-817-7.
- North Carolina Manual (PDF). Raleigh: North Carolina Department of the Secretary of State. 2011. OCLC 2623953. Archived from the original (PDF) on August 2, 2023.
- Orth, John V.; Newby, Paul M. (2013). The North Carolina State Constitution (second ed.). Oxford University Press. ISBN 978-0-19-930065-5.
- Sawyer, Ann L. (1981). "Fifty Years of North Carolina State Government". Popular Government. Vol. 46, no. 3. UNC Institute of Government. pp. 4–10.
- Spiller, Asher P. (September 2012). "The Folly in Finality: The Constitutionality of ALJ Final Decision-Making Authority in North Carolina". North Carolina Law Review. 90 (6): 2162–2194.
