= North Carolina Department of Information Technology =

North Carolina Department of Information Technology (NCDIT)
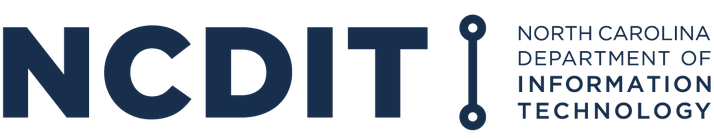
- Logo of the North Carolina Department of Information Technology

Agency overview
- Formed: 2015
- Headquarters: Raleigh, North Carolina
- Agency executive: Nate Denny
- Website: it.nc.gov

The North Carolina Department of Information Technology was established in 2015 and authorized by North Carolina General Statute 143B, Paragraph 143B-1320. It replaced and succeeded the state's Office of Information Technology. The department provides technology services to North Carolina state agencies and related customers.

== Secretaries ==
The department is headed by a Secretary/Chief Information Officer:

- Chris Estes, 2012-2015
- Keith Warner, 2015-2017
- Eric Boyette, 2017-2020
- Tracey Doaks, 2020-2020
- Thomas Parrish IV (acting), 2020-2021
- James Weaver, 2021-2025
- Teena Piccione, 2025–April 6, 2026
- Nate Denny, April 6, 2026–
