= North Carolina Executive Mansion =

Historic building in North Carolina, US

- U.S. National Register of Historic Places
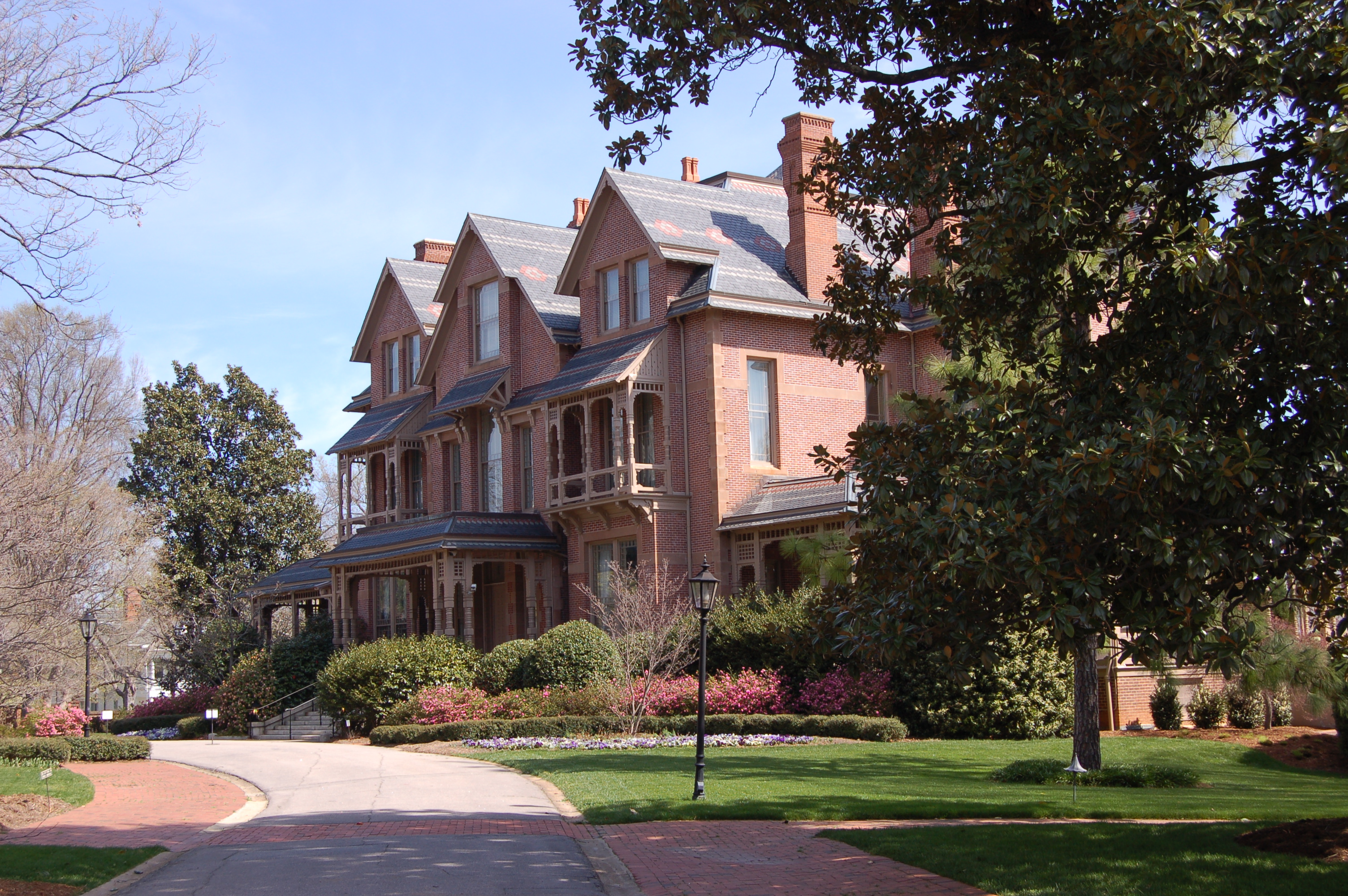

- Location within North Carolina Location within the United States
- Location: 210 N. Blount St., Raleigh, North Carolina
- Coordinates: 35°46′59″N 78°38′7″W
- Area: 9 acres (3.6 ha)
- Built: 1883–1891
- Architect: Sloan, Samuel; Bauer, Gustavus Adolphus
- Architectural style: Queen Anne; Stick/Eastlake
- NRHP reference No.: 70000475
- Added to NRHP: February 26, 1970

The North Carolina Executive Mansion (also referred to as the North Carolina Governor's Mansion) is the official residence of the governor of North Carolina and their family. The First Lady of North Carolina is the mansion's official hostess. Building began in the year 1883 and it was designed by architects Samuel Sloan and A.G. Bauer. The first occupants, Governor Daniel G. Fowle and his daughter, Helen Whitaker Fowle, moved into the unfinished building in January 1891. It is located within the Blount Street Historic District and is an example of Queen Anne style architecture.

== History ==
During the Antebellum period and through the Civil War, the governors and their families resided at the Governor's Palace on Fayetteville Street. Zebulon Baird Vance was the last governor to live in the palace, which was seized by General William Tecumseh Sherman during the Carolinas campaign. In 1877, during his second term, Governor Vance asked the North Carolina General Assembly to fund the construction of a newer official residence, which was approved in 1879.

The original street plan of the city of Raleigh had designated Burke Square as a possible location for the governor's residence. Burke Square was already occupied by the Raleigh Academy by the time the state decided to build and a different site for the house was chosen. The legislature passed a bill in 1883 under Governor Thomas Jordan Jarvis's prompting, to authorize the construction on Burke Square of Raleigh's third official gubernatorial residence. The bill provided for its major furnishings and required that the governor occupy the new dwelling. Prison labor was used for construction and building materials were used that could be made at the local penitentiary when feasible. Samuel Sloan, of Philadelphia, and his assistant, Aldophus Gustavus Bauer, were chosen as architects. Sloan arrived in Raleigh with his designs for the elaborate structure in April 1883 and work began in early summer. Sloan died in 1885, six years before the completion of the house, and Bauer assumed full responsibility for the remainder of the project. Bauer remained in North Carolina to become one of the state's most important nineteenth-century architects.

The bricks for the house were made from Wake County clay and molded by prison labor. Many of these bricks, particularly in the sidewalks surrounding the house, still bear the inscribed names of the men who made them. The sandstone trim came from Anson County. The marble steps in front (later moved to the north side) came from Cherokee County, and oak and heart pine were shipped from all across North Carolina for use in the building.

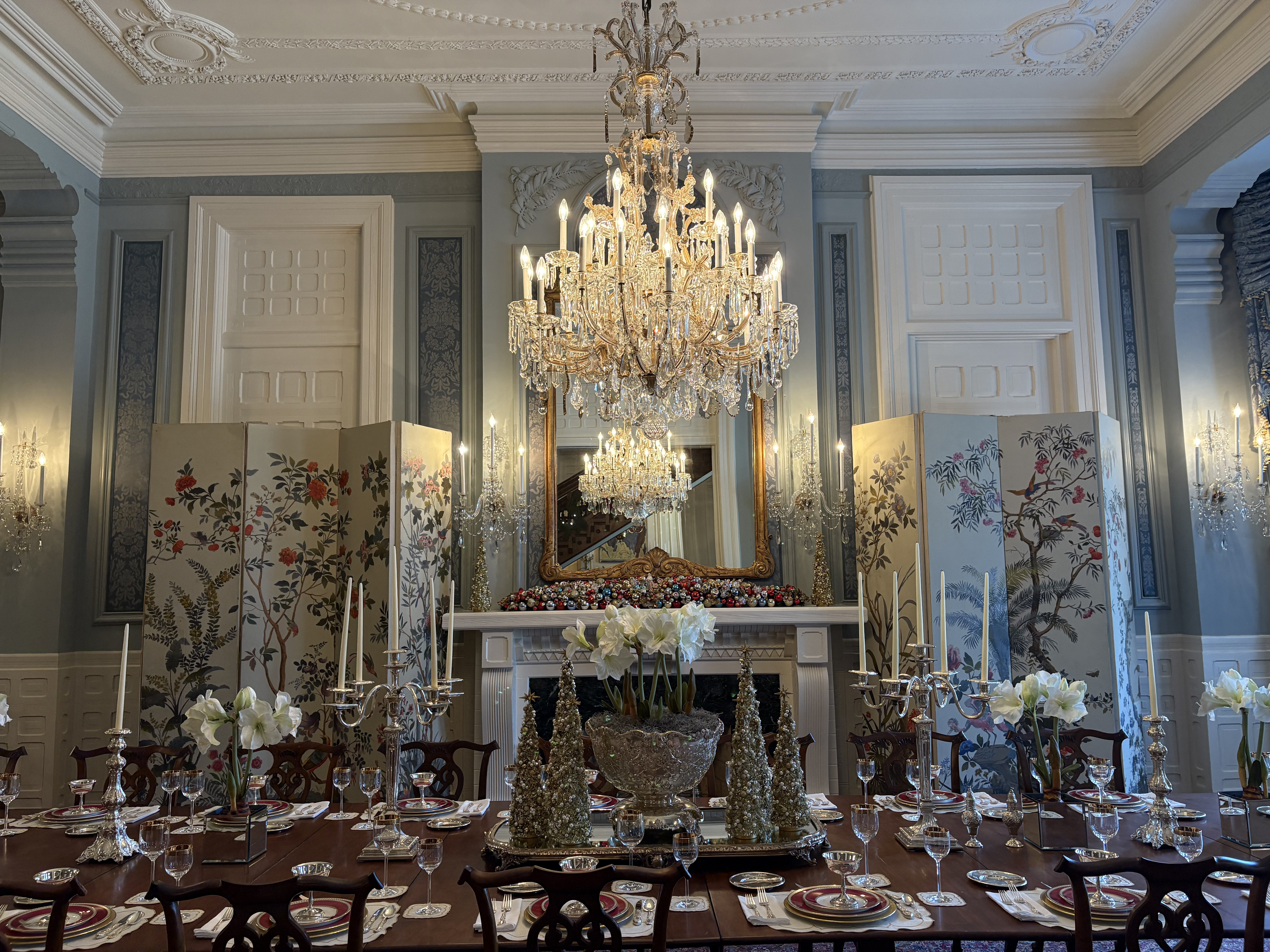
The mansion's state dining room, featuring the Strauss chandelier, in December 2025.

Since its initial construction in 1882, few major changes have been made to the building's exterior. Porches on the north and east sides have been enclosed to expand kitchen and security facilities.

Frank Daniels Aycock, the son of Governor Charles B. Aycock and First Lady Cora Lily Woodard Aycock, was the first baby to be born in the executive mansion.

A Neoclassical makeover was undertaken during Governor Angus W. McLean's administration. Many Victorian features were changed or removed, including painting of woodwork; removal of stained glass, balustrades, overmantel mirrors and whatnot shelving; and replacement of columns and pilasters.

First Lady Alice Willson Broughton oversaw the addition of a service elevator in the house, and established a victory garden on the lawn during World War II. In the 1960s, a rose garden was planted on the northwest corner of the grounds by First Lady Margaret Rose Sanford.

During her tenure as first lady, Jeanelle C. Moore began a campaign for public awareness of the mansion's historic and cultural significance. Her dedication resulted in the formation of the Executive Mansion Fine Arts Committee, a statutory committee which advises and supports the acquisition of gifts, purchases, maintenance and preservation. Around 1968, Moore installed the Strauss chandelier in the state dining room, which was donated by Holocaust survivor Karoline Strauss Horowitz. In 1970, the mansion was listed in the National Register of Historic Places. In 1974–75, under the supervision of First Lady Patricia Hollingsworth Holshouser, the mansion underwent a major renovation which included the plumbing, heating, air conditioning and electrical systems. These interior and exterior rehabilitation projects were crucial to the preservation and continued use of the building.

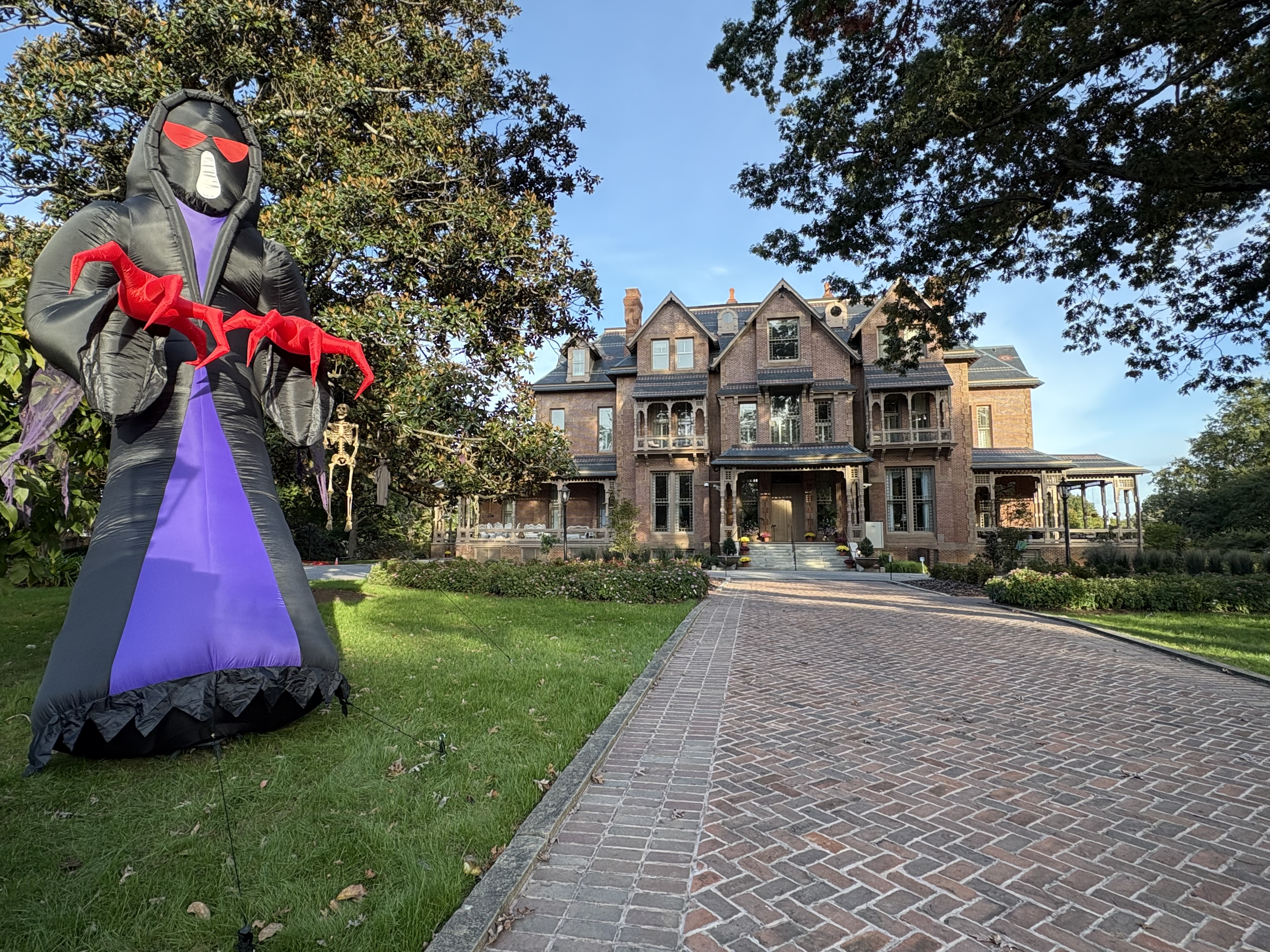
A Halloween decoration on the front lawn at the mansion in 2025.

In 1988, the Executive Mansion Fund Inc., a non-profit corporation, was created with the help of first lady Dottie Martin in order to provide further support for restoration and preservation. The fund is charged with soliciting grants, donations, bequests and other contributions and with investing and managing these funds. Its successful Second Century campaign resulted in the establishment of a $2 million endowment. The Executive Mansion Fund Inc. has established a membership organization—the Friends of the Executive Mansion, a group of concerned individual and corporate citizens who wish to support the Executive Mansion through their annual contributions.

== Governor's Western Residence ==
The State of North Carolina also owns a second residence for the use of the governor, at 45 Patton Mountain Road on Town Mountain near Asheville. It was donated to the state by the Asheville Chamber of Commerce in 1964, in the hope that future governors would spend more time in—and hence pay more attention to—the western portion of the state. The home was built originally in 1939 by Tom Brimer, who was then owner of Good Humor Ice Cream. The 6,000-square-foot (560 m^{2}) mansion sits on 18 acres (73,000 m^{2}) of land.

== See also ==
- Governor's Palace (Raleigh, North Carolina), former official residence of the governor
- Hawkins-Hartness House, official office of the lieutenant governor of North Carolina
- Tryon Palace, official residence of the British governors of North Carolina
- Bailey-Tucker House, the former official guest house of the governor of North Carolina
