= Jeanelle C. Moore =

First Lady of North Carolina

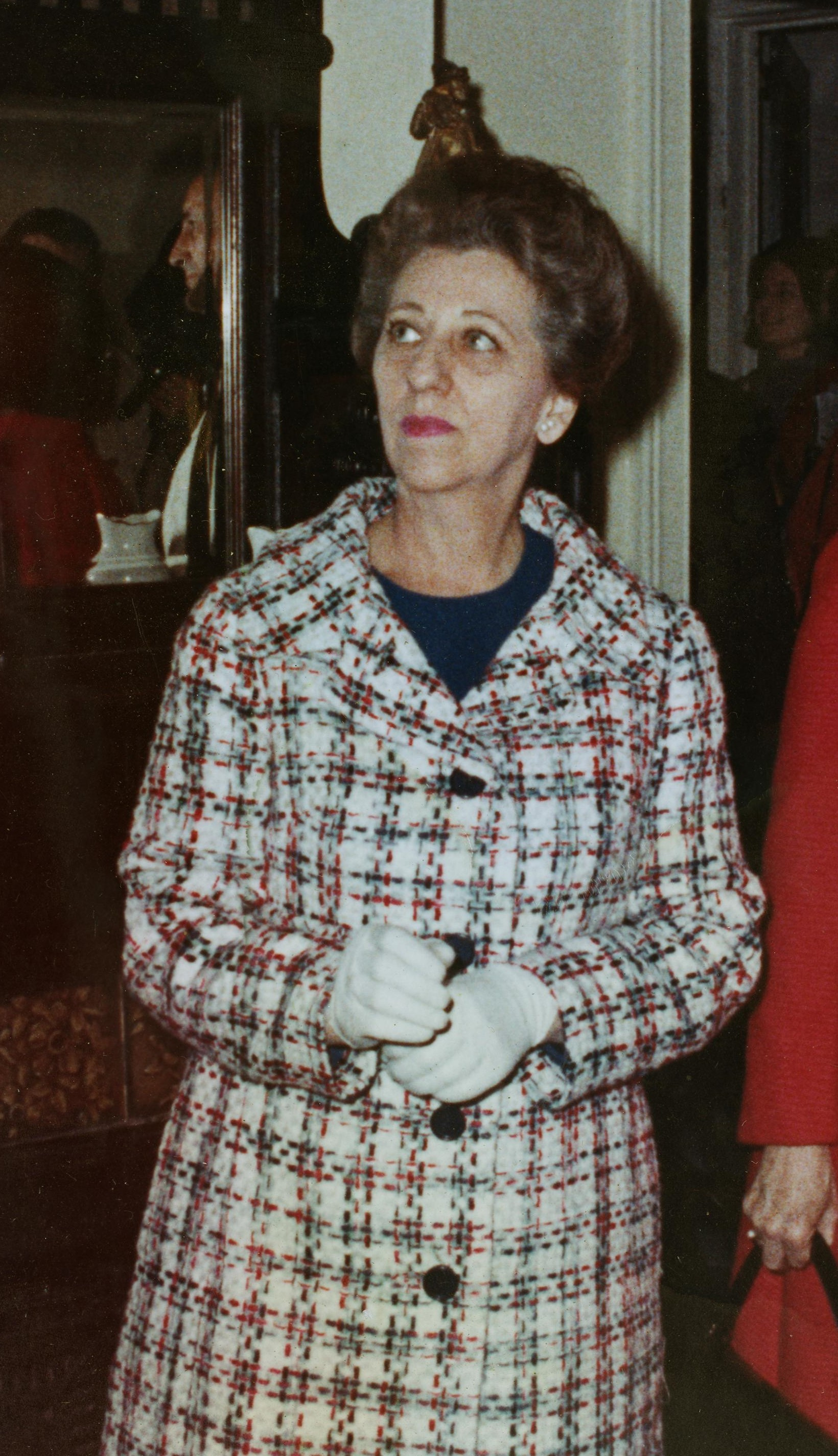
- Moore in 1967

First Lady of North Carolina
- In role January 8, 1965 – January 3, 1969
- Governor: Dan K. Moore
- Preceded by: Margaret Rose Knight Sanford
- Succeeded by: Jessie Rae Scott

Personal details
- Born: July 13, 1911 Pikeville, Tennessee, U.S.
- Died: October 20, 1999 (aged 88) Raleigh, North Carolina, U.S.
- Resting place: Historic Oakwood Cemetery
- Party: Democratic
- Spouse: Dan K. Moore
- Children: 2
- Parent(s): Coy Hixson Coulter; Margaret Colvard Coulter
- Education: Western Carolina Teachers College
- Occupation: teacher

Jeanelle Coulter Moore (July 13, 1911 – October 20, 1999) was an American schoolteacher, patron of the arts, and civic leader who, as the wife of Governor Dan K. Moore, served as the First Lady of North Carolina from 1965 to 1969. She was the first wife of a governor in North Carolina to have a full-time secretary and maintain her own office in the North Carolina Executive Mansion, and she served as president of the Sir Walter Cabinet while her husband was in office. She was responsible for the creation of the Executive Mansion Fine Arts Committee within the North Carolina Department of Natural and Cultural Resources, which provides funding to restore and decorate the official residence, and established a chapel at the Raleigh Correctional Center for Women. Prior to her time as first lady, Moore served as a board member of the North Carolina Fund and of the North Carolina School of the Arts, having been appointed by Governor Terry Sanford. In 1980 she received the North Carolina Award for Public service.

== Early life and education ==
Moore was born on July 13, 1911, in Pikeville, Tennessee, to Coy Hixson Coulter and Margaret Colvard Coulter. She attended the University of Tennessee before transferring to Western Carolina Teachers College in Cullowhee, North Carolina, where she received a bachelor's degree in education.

== Career and public life ==
After graduating from college, Moore taught second grade at an elementary school in Sylva, North Carolina. She continued teaching until the birth of her first child.

Moore was appointed by Governor Terry Sanford to serve on the board of the North Carolina Fund to study causes of poverty in North Carolina. In 1958, while her husband was serving as a judge on the North Carolina Superior Court, they toured the Raleigh Correctional Center for Women. Seeing that the prison did not have a chapel, Moore launched a project during Holy Week in 1966 to raise private funds to build a chapel. Groundbreaking for the new chapel, called the Chapel of the Nameless Woman, started on December 18, 1966.

When her husband announced his gubernatorial campaign, Moore responded that she did not want him to run for office. She worked on his 1964 campaign, travelling around North Carolina to make public appearances and give speeches on behalf of her husband. On a campaign tour of the state, she accompanied Lady Bird Johnson aboard the Lady Bird Special, First Lady Johnson's train. She reportedly impressed Johnson with her natural speaking ability.

She served on the board of trustees of the North Carolina School of the Arts and was a member of the school's foundation. In 1996 she received the Giannini Award in recognition for her financial contributions and service to the school. Moore christened a B-52 bomber named The First Lady at Seymour Johnson Air Force Base in Goldsboro and the research vessel Dan K. Moore. She also headed the state highway's beautification program and advocated for tourism of North Carolina's historic sites, particularly Tryon Palace.

Moore was the first governor's wife in North Carolina to have a full-time secretary and maintain her own office in the North Carolina Executive Mansion. She called her first press conference at a luncheon to announce the formation of the Executive Mansion Fine Arts Advisory Committee, which she established to promote awareness for the need of historic preservation and restoration, and fundraise to provide furnishings, decorations and works of art for the official residence. The first meeting was held on November 12, 1965. She hired Lorraine Pearce, who was formerly the White House curator, to develop a preservation plan for the executive mansion. Moore hosted a tea on June 20, 1966, with representatives from all one-hundred North Carolinian counties in order to launch a fundraising campaign for furnishings in the mansion's public rooms. The committee was later established as a state statutory committee in the North Carolina Department of Natural and Cultural Resources. Her work led to the mansion's addition to the National Register of Historic Places in 1970. Around 1968, Moore had the Strauss chandelier, which was donated by Holocaust survivor Karoline Strauss Horowitz, installed in the executive mansion's state dining room. In 1968 she was awarded the Ruth Coltrane Cannon Award by Preservation NC. Moore also drafted plans to relandscape the gardens at the mansion.

She was elected president of the Sir Walter Cabinet, a society open to spouses of North Carolina government officials, while still serving as first lady. Towards the end of her husband's administration, she appeared in the television program A Tour of the North Carolina Executive Mansion with Mrs. Dan K. Moore.

After retiring from public life, Moore served as a trustee Raleigh Boychoir and of the North Carolina Museum of Art and sat as a member of the museum's education committee. She also served on the board of advisors at Meredith College and on the board of directors at the Raleigh Rescue Mission.

She and her husband received the North Carolina Award for Public Service in 1980.

== Personal life ==
Moore met her future husband, Daniel Killian Moore, in 1931 while visiting relatives in North Carolina and taking a summer course at Western Carolina Teachers College. She attended a local Methodist church where Moore, an attorney practicing in Sylva, was the sunday school superintendent. She and Moore were married on May 4, 1933. They had two children: Edith Coulter Moore and Daniel Killian Moore, Jr.

== Death ==
Moore died on October 20, 1999, in Raleigh. After her death, Governor Jim Hunt eulogized her, saying that "North Carolina has lost one of its strongest advocates of beauty and art." Her funeral was held at Edenton Street United Methodist Church, where she and her family were parishioners. She was buried next to her husband in Historic Oakwood Cemetery.

Honorary titles
Preceded by Margaret Rose Sanford	First Lady of North Carolina; 1965–1969	Succeeded by Jessie Rae Scott
