= Thomas de Grenier de Fonblanque =

Thomas de Grenier de Fonblanque, KH, (26 January 1793 – 1861) was a British diplomat, Her Britannic Majesty's Consul General and Consul-General to Serbia.

== Family ==
Thomas de Grenier de Fonblanque, descended from a French Huguenot family. He was born in London. His grandfather, John de Grenier Fonblanque, had been a banker naturalised in England under the name Fonblanque; his son, John Anthony Fonblanque, was Thomas's father. Thomas's mother, Frances Caroline Fitzgerald, was a granddaughter of Colonel Samuel Martin of Antigua, West Indies and niece of Samuel Martin. Her brother was the poet William Thomas Fitzgerald. Thomas had two brothers, Albany Fonblanque, a celebrated journalist, and John Samuel Martin Fonblanque, legal writer and Commissioner of Bankruptcy.

Thomas de Grenier de Fonblanque married Jane Catherine Barrington, of Dublin, daughter of Sir Jonah Barrington, a judge known for his popular and amusing memoirs. They had five children. Among them was Edward Barrington de Fonblanque (1821-1895), former British military officer, writer and historian. Through his eldest daughter, Jane Catherine, who married Major Pennefather, de Fonblanque is the grandfather of Sir John Pennefather. Another of his daughter, Adelaide Arabella de Grenier de Fonblanque (1822-1856), married count Otto von Schlippenbach, and died in Basedow, Germany.

== See also ==
- List of ambassadors of the United Kingdom to Serbia
