= Fonblanque =

Fonblanque and de Fonblanque are Huguenot names. They may refer to nine members of a prominent English family, descending from Jean de Grenier de Fonblanque, a naturalised Englishman as Jean de Grenier Fonblanque, and banker in London, who was descended from an ancient and noble Huguenot family of Languedoc:

- Albany Fonblanque (1793–1872), English historian;
- Edward Barrington de Fonblanque (1821–1895), English historian;
- Edward Barrington de Fonblanque (British Army officer) (1895–1981), British Army officer;
- Florence Gertrude de Fonblanque (1864–1949), British suffragist;
- John Anthony Fonblanque (1759–1837), politician;
- John Samuel Martin Fonblanque (1787–1865), Commissioner of Bankruptcy;
- Philip de Fonblanque (1885–1940), British Army officer;
- Sir John Pennefather, 1st Baronet (1856–1933), full name John de Fonblanque Pennefather;
- Thomas de Grenier de Fonblanque (1793–1861), diplomat and Consul-General to Serbia.
