= John Fonblanque =

John Fonblanque may refer to:

- John Anthony Fonblanque (1759–1837), English equity lawyer and Member of Parliament for Camelford 1802–1806
- John Samuel Martin Fonblanque (1787–1865), Commissioner of Bankruptcy
- Sir John Pennefather, 1st Baronet (1856–1933), full name John de Fonblanque Pennefather

== See also ==
- Fonblanque (disambiguation)
