= Edward Barrington de Fonblanque (British Army officer) =

British Army officer

- Edward Barrington de Fonblanque in 1960
- Born: 29 May 1895; Kensington, London, England
- Died: 17 September 1981 (aged 86); Southampton, Hampshire, England
- Relatives: John Anthony Fonblanque (great-great-grandfather); Albany Fonblanque (uncle); John Samuel Martin Fonblanque (uncle); Edward Barrington de Fonblanque (grandfather); Philip de Fonblanque (brother)
- Military career
- Allegiance: United Kingdom
- Branch: British Army
- Service years: 1914–1951
- Rank: Major General
- Unit: Royal Artillery
- Commands: Salisbury Plain District; Royal Artillery, V Corps; Royal Artillery, 45th Division; 2nd Regiment, Royal Horse Artillery
- Conflicts: First World War; Second World War
- Awards: Companion of the Order of the Bath; Commander of the Order of the British Empire; Distinguished Service Order; Mentioned in Despatches (2); Commander of the Legion of Merit (United States)

Major General Edward Barrington de Fonblanque, CB, CBE, DSO (29 May 1895 – 17 September 1981) was a British Army officer of the First and Second World Wars, and later served as aide-de-camp to King George VI.

== Family and early life ==
De Fonblanque was the son of Lester Ramsey de Fonblanque, and Constance Lucy (née Kerr), his paternal great-great-grandfather was the politician John Anthony Fonblanque and his grandfather the historian Edward Barrington de Fonblanque. He was also descended from Sir Jonah Barrington. His elder brother, Philip de Fonblanque, was also an officer in the British Army. Edward was educated at Rugby School.

== Military career ==
In 1914, de Fonblanque joined the Royal Garrison Artillery and served throughout the First World War. From 1921 to 1925 he was an instructor at the Army School of Equitation at Weedon, and from 1923 to 1931 he was captain of the Royal Horse Artillery. He competed in two events at the 1924 Summer Olympics.

From 1934 to 1938, de Fonblanque was an instructor at the Command and Staff College in Quetta. From 1938 to 1939, he commanded the B/O Battery Royal Horse Artillery, and in 1939–40 commanded the 2nd Regiment, Royal Horse Artillery. In 1941, he was commander of the Royal Artillery, 45th Division, and from 1941 to 1943 served as chief of staff of the X Corps. From 1944 to 1945, he was corps commander of the Royal Artillery, V Corps. De Fonblanque was awarded the Distinguished Service Order and appointed a Commander of the Order of the British Empire in 1945, both in recognition of gallant and distinguished services in Italy. In 1947, he was named a Commander of the United States Legion of Merit.

After the Second World War, de Fonblanque served as chief of staff of the I Corps. In 1947, he served as chief administrative of the Allied Commission in Germany and as aide-de-camp to George VI. From 1948 to 1951, he served as commander of the Salisbury Plain District. He was appointed a Companion of the Order of the Bath in the 1948 Birthday Honours.

After de Fonblanque's retirement from active duty in 1951, he served in British Malaya as assistant commissioner of civil defence, and as inspector-general of the Federal Home Guard from 1952 to 1958. In 1952, he became colonel commandant of the Royal Artillery and from 1959 was representative, colonel commandant.

== Personal life ==
In 1933, de Fonblanque married Elizabeth Flora Lutley Sclater, granddaughter of zoologist Philip Sclater. They had two sons and one daughter: Patricia Constance de Fonblanque, Brigadier Hugh Barrington de Fonblanque, and John Robert de Fonblanque.

De Fonblanque died in 1981, aged 86.
