= William Byam Martin =

English merchant (1746–1806)

- Born: 1746
- Died: 1806 (aged 59–60)
- Occupation: Merchant

William Byam Martin (1746–1806) was an English merchant and official of the East India Company.

== Early life ==
William was the son of Samuel Martin (1694–1776), a slave owner in Antigua. Samuel Martin (1714–1788), Secretary to the Treasury was his half-brother, and he had two other brothers, Sir Henry Martin, 1st Baronet (1733–1794), for many years naval commissioner at Portsmouth and Comptroller of the Navy, and Josiah Martin (1737–1786), Governor of North Carolina from 1771.

He was Resident for Murshidabad, resigning in January 1780.
