= Philip de Fonblanque =

British Army general (1885–1940)

Major-General Philip de Fonblanque DSO
- Born: 16 November 1885; British India
- Died: 2 July 1940 (aged 54); Cambridge, England
- Burial place: Cambridge City Cemetery
- Relatives: John Anthony Fonblanque (great, great grandfather); Edward Barrington de Fonblanque (grandfather); Albany Fonblanque (uncle); John Samuel Martin Fonblanque (uncle); Edward Barrington de Fonblanque (brother)
- Military career
- Allegiance: United Kingdom
- Branch: British Army
- Service years: 1905–1940
- Rank: Major-General
- Unit: Royal Engineers
- Commands: Lines of Communication, British Expeditionary Force
- Conflicts: First World War; Second World War: Battle of France
- Awards: Distinguished Service Order; Mentioned in Despatches

Major-General Philip de Fonblanque, DSO (16 November 1885 – 2 July 1940) was a senior British officer, who at the start of the Second World War, organised the logistics for the British Expeditionary Force in France and Belgium. Already a sick man, the result of his exertions was that he died shortly after his evacuation from France in June 1940.

== Early life ==
Philip de Fonblanque was born in 1885 in British India, the elder son of Lester Ramsay de Fonblanque, Vicomte de Fonblanque whose father was Edward Barrington de Fonblanque, a writer and traveller descended from a Huguenot family, and Constance Lucy, the daughter of Colonel Hon. Robert Dundas Kerr, and great-granddaughter of William Kerr, 5th Marquess of Lothian. His younger brother, Edward Barrington de Fonblanque (1895–1981), also rose to become a major-general.

He entered Rugby School in May 1899 at the age of 13 and left in 1902. From there, he became a cadet at the Royal Military Academy, Woolwich for a year and was commissioned as a Second Lieutenant in March 1905.

In 1916 he married Stella, eldest daughter of Sir Henry May, governor of Hong Kong. There were a son and two daughters of the marriage.

== Military career ==
During the First World War, Captain de Fonblanque was given the temporary rank of Major when he took command of a Field Company of Royal Engineers in November 1916, although he relinquished this rank to become a staff officer to a chief engineer in July 1917.

Between the wars, de Fonblanque held a number of staff posts, culminating in being appointed Chief Administration Officer of Scottish Command in 1937. In October 1938, he headed a British mission with the task of observing the withdrawal of the Czechoslovak Army from the Sudetenland under the terms of the Munich Agreement.

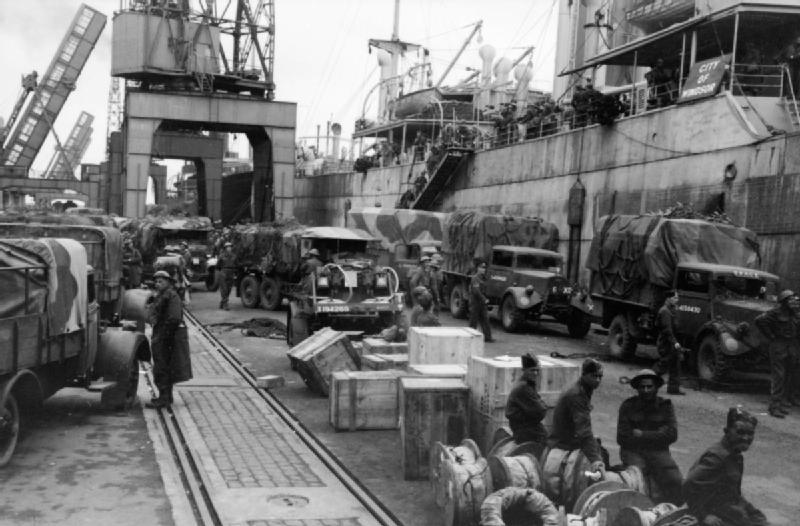
British vehicles awaiting evacuation on the quayside at Cherbourg during Operation Aerial in June 1940.

With the outbreak of the Second World War and the dispatch of the British Expeditionary Force (BEF) to France in September 1939, de Fonblanque was appointed General Officer Commanding, Lines of Communication Area for the force, which was under the overall command of Lord Gort.

De Fonblanque's responsibility was to facilitate the supply of everything required by the force in its forward positions on the border with Belgium. By January 1940, the total size of the BEF had risen to 222,200 men in six divisions. Originally, the materiel needed by the force was all channelled through depots at Nantes and Brest, but construction of an Advance Base Area began at Le Havre in November 1939. By the following April, some nineteen French ports were being used for British logistics, with up to 100,000 tons of stores being imported monthly. In addition to that, a network of reserve and forward supply depots had been constructed in an area extending over a third of France.

As the Battle of France progressed, de Fonblanque, whose headquarters were at Le Mans, and much of his logistic chain, became separated from the fighting formations of the BEF by the German Blitzkrieg. The arrival of General Sir Alan Brooke on 13 June to command the remaining British troops in France, was the catalyst for the decision to evacuate all of them, an undertaking codenamed Operation Aerial. De Fonblanque was heavily involved in organising the landward side of the evacuation, which was successful in getting away almost all the men, some 190,000 of them, as well as a great quantity of invaluable guns, vehicles and stores that could easily have been lost. Winston Churchill later wrote in his memoirs, The Second World War:

This reflects great credit on General Brooke's embarkation staff, of whom the chief, General de Fonblanque, a British officer, died shortly afterwards as a result of his exertions.

His death from an existing illness hastened by his heavy responsibilities in France took place in Cambridge on 2 July 1940, aged 54. He is buried in Cambridge City Cemetery.

== Bibliography ==
- Smart, Nick (2005). Biographical Dictionary of British Generals of the Second World War. Barnesley: Pen & Sword. ISBN 1844150496.
