= Edward Barrington de Fonblanque =

Edward Barrington de Fonblanque (18 January 1821 – 14 June 1895) was a British historian of English, Irish and Huguenot stock.

== Family ==
Edward was born in Calais to Thomas de Grenier de Fonblanque, Her Britannic Majesty's Consul General and Consul-General to Serbia, and Jane Catherine Barrington of Dublin. Through his grandfather, John Anthony Fonblanque, Edward was descended from a Huguenot family. His great-grandfather shortened his surname, de Grenier de Fonblanque, on his naturalisation in England, though some of his descendants later added it back. Edward's uncles were Albany Fonblanque and John Samuel Martin Fonblanque.

His maternal grandfather was Sir Jonah Barrington, a judge known for his popular and amusing memoirs. Edward was said to have inherited his humour and wit.

== Career ==
De Fonblanque was educated in Bonn, Germany and had excellent language skills. In 1854, during the Crimean War, he served as the Deputy-Assistant Commissary-General for the Royal Army Service Corps. After the war, he was promoted to commissariat and sent to China. He later helped form the Italian Volunteer Legion during the First Boer War. He eventually joined the War Office as deputy controller.

He retired early, possibly from exhaustion, which allowed him to devote his time to writing. He suffered a leg injury while riding that never properly healed, and though he was able to travel extensively, his leg was eventually amputated.

Most of his writings were related to military history and were well received. A mention of his work in 1862 stated: "Mr. Edward de Fonblanque's serious, full and conscientious studies of military organization in the various armies of Europe, — made, we believe, under the auspices of the present Earl of Dalhousie, and published about a year ago, — are worth twenty works like Red, White and Blue." His 1876 work, Political and Military Episodes in the Latter Half of the Eighteenth Century was devoted to British General John Burgoyne.

He also penned two volumes on the noble Percy and Smythe families, as well as a children's story, Cluck-cluck.

== Personal life ==
One of de Fonblanque's daughters, Louise Beatrice, married Francis William Lowther, illegitimate son of William Lowther, 2nd Earl of Lonsdale, in 1868. Another daughter, Lavinia Mary, married Wilkinson Jocelyn Shaw, son of Sir Frederick Shaw, 3rd Baronet, in 1873. By his sixth son, Lester Ramsay de Fonblanque, he was grandfather of Major-General Philip de Fonblanque, who organised logistics for the British Expeditionary Force in France and Belgium at the very beginning of the Second World War, and his namesake Major-General Edward Barrington de Fonblanque, who fought in both world wars.

He lived in London, but died age 74, in Bourne End, Buckinghamshire, where he had gone to stay with a friend after falling ill.

== Publications ==
- A Life-Journey From Mannheim to Inkerman. From the Reminiscences of an Army Surgeon London: Ward and Downey, 1890.
- Annals of the House of Percy: From the Conquest to the Opening of the Nineteenth Century (Vol. 1 & 2) London: R. Clay & Sons. 1887
- Lives of the Lords Strangford: With Their Ancestors and Contemporaries Through Ten Generations 1877
- Cluck-cluck: A Christmas story told by Grandpapa Potmouse London: Pickering, 1877
- Some Account of a New System of Elementary Teaching. London: Basil Montagu Pickering, 1877.
- Political and Military Episodes in the Latter Half of the Eighteenth Century London : Macmillan & Co., 1876.
- Life and Labours of Albany Fonblanque. London: Bentley, 1874.
- Niphon and Pe-che-li; or, Two Years in Japan and Northern China London: Saunders, Otley and Co. 1863
- Treatise on the Administration and Organization of the British Army. London, Longman, Brown, Green, Longmans, and Roberts, 1858
- Money or Merit. The Army Purchase Question Considered with Especial Reference to the Recent Commission of Inquiry. London: C.J. Skeet, 1857. (with Charles E. Trevelyan)
