= Ballow =

Ballows may refer to:

== Persons ==
- Henry Ballow (1707–1789), English lawyer
- David Keith Ballow (1804–1859), Australian government medical officer

== Buildings ==
- Ballows Chambers, heritage-listed office building, Brisbane, Queensland, Australia
