= Samuel Martin (planter) =

British West Indian planter (c. 1694–1777)

- Born: c. 1694; Green Castle, Antigua
- Died: 1777 (aged 82–83); Ashtead, England
- Education: Trinity College, Cambridge
- Occupations: Planter; politician; writer
- Notable work: Essay upon Plantership (1754)
- Children: 21, including Samuel, Henry, and Josiah
- Parents: Samuel Martin (father); Lydia Tomlinson (mother)
- Military service
- Allegiance: Great Britain
- Branch: Antigua Militia
- Rank: Colonel

Colonel Samuel Martin (c. 1694 – 1777) was a British West Indian planter who wrote Essay upon Plantership (1754). He is known as "Samuel Martin the Elder" to distinguish him from his son, Samuel Martin, who served as a British member of parliament and the secretary to the Treasury.

== Early life and career ==
Martin was born on the Green Castle plantation in Antigua, to Major Samuel Martin who, in 1701, was murdered during a slave revolt after having demanded the enslaved Africans on his estate work on Christmas Day. The seven year old Samuel escaped a similar fate, being hidden in nearby fields by his nanny. She was herself enslaved and was subsequently freed in recognition of this act. The younger Samuel was sent to live with family in Ireland while his mother remarried Edward Byam.

== Personal life ==
Martin fathered 21 children, at least 16 of whom died during his lifetime. The eldest son, Samuel, became a British member of parliament and the secretary to the Treasury; Henry became comptroller of the Navy, a member of parliament, and a baronet; Josiah was governor of North Carolina.

== Essay upon Plantership ==
In 1754, Martin wrote Essay upon Plantership, a treatise on managing a sugar plantation. It appeared in at least seven editions between 1750 and 1802. In the work, he urged planters to treat their slaves with “tenderness and generosity”; the aim was to induce “love” by setting an example of “benevolence, justice, temperance, and chastity.” When Janet Schaw, a Scot, visited his Greencastle estate in Antigua in 1774, she described the eighty-year-old planter in rosy terms, as “a kind and beneficent Master,” who was “daily employed” to render the island “more improved.”
