= Josiah Martin =

British Army officer and colonial administrator (1737–1786)

His Excellency Josiah Martin
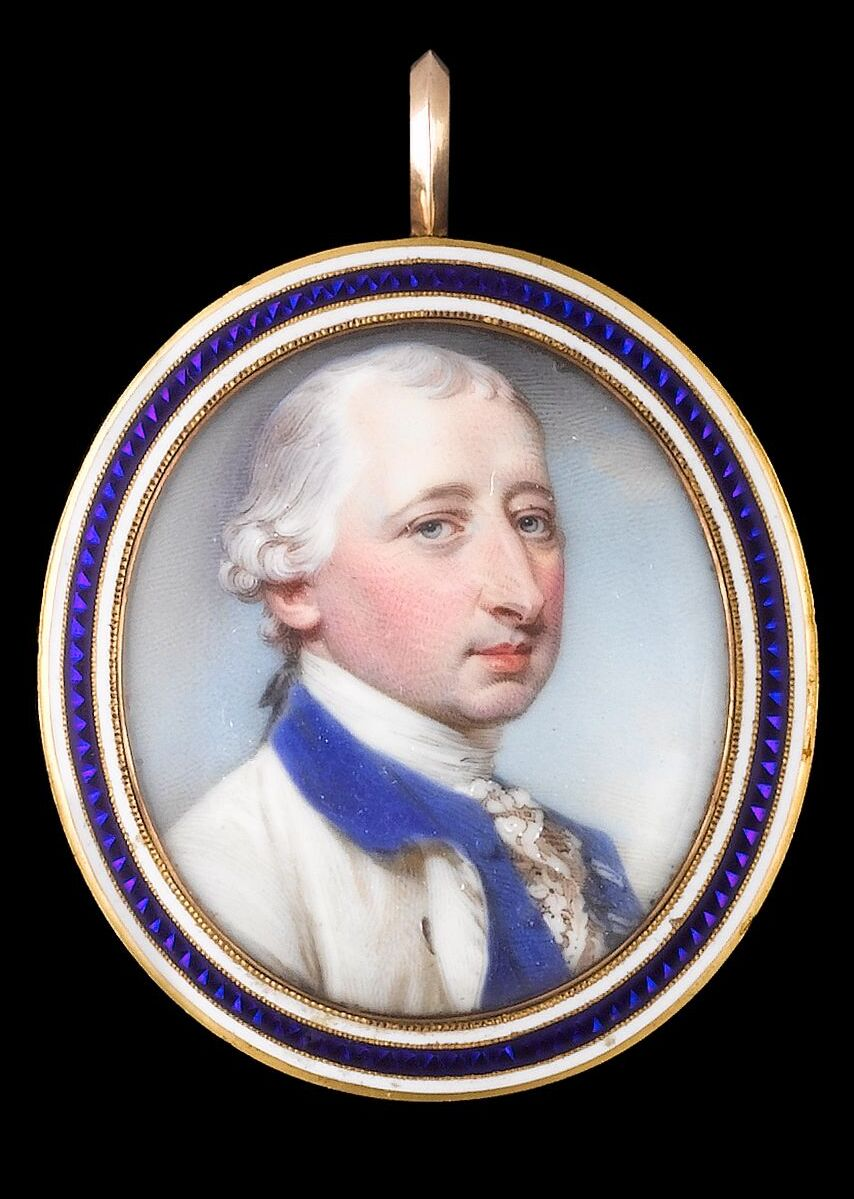
- Portrait by Jeremiah Meyer, c. 1763

Governor of North Carolina
- In office 12 August 1771 – 4 July 1776; In exile 4 July 1776 – 3 September 1783
- Monarch: George III
- Preceded by: James Hasell (acting)
- Succeeded by: Vacant (American Revolution) (Title next held by Richard Caswell)

Personal details
- Born: 23 April 1737 County Dublin, Ireland
- Died: 13 April 1786 (aged 48) London, England
- Resting place: St George's, Hanover Square
- Spouse: Elizabeth Martin (m. 1761)
- Children: 6
- Parents: Samuel Martin (father); Sarah Wyke (mother)
- Relatives: Samuel Martin (half-brother); Sir Henry Martin (brother)

Military service
- Allegiance: Great Britain
- Branch: Antigua Militia; British Army
- Years of service: 1754–1769
- Rank: Lieutenant Colonel
- Unit: 4th Regiment of Foot; 103d Regiment of Foot; 68th Regiment of Foot; 22d Regiment of Foot
- Battles: Seven Years' War; capture of Louisbourg; Battle of the Plains of Abraham; capture of Martinique; capture of Havana

Josiah Martin (23 April 1737 – 13 April 1786) was a British Army officer and colonial administrator who served as the governor of North Carolina from 1771 to 1783. He was the last British governor of North Carolina and was forced to leave the colony in 1776 as a result of the American War of Independence, spending the last seven years of his gubernatorial tenure in in exile.

== Early life and military service ==
Josiah Martin was born in County Dublin, Ireland on 23 April 1737. He was the son of Samuel Martin, a planter in the British colony of Antigua, and was the third son of his father's second marriage. Martin's elder half-brother Samuel served as Secretary to the Treasury in London. Another brother, Henry, was naval commissioner at Portsmouth and Comptroller of the Navy. In 1752 Martin moved to Antigua alongside a tutor and two years later was commissioned as an officer in the Antigua Militia, commanding a cavalry troop of gentlemen.

In 1756, following after the outbreak of the Seven Years' War, Martin was commissioned as an ensign in the 4th Regiment of Foot and also served in the 103d, 68th, and 22d regiments of foot. As part of the French and Indian War, he participated in capture of Louisbourg in mid-1758 and was appointed to the New York Executive Council on 29 December 1758 before fighting in the Battle of the Plains of Abraham on 13 September 1759.

In 1761 Martin married his first cousin Elizabeth. During the next year he participated in the capture of Martinique between January and February and the capture of Havana between June and August. In November 1762 his position on the council was temporarily replaced due to Martin's frequent business trips to London and Antigua, and he was given "a full year to determine whether he will return to the council from the West Indies." Martin was promoted to lieutenant colonel of the 22nd Regiment of Foot in 1769, but sold his commission that year due to financial and health problems.

== Governor of North Carolina ==
On 1 March 1771 George III appointed Martin as governor of North Carolina, succeeding James Hasell. Handicapped by illness, Martin remained at home in New York until 12 August. Martin tried to give the North Carolinians useful and fair provincial government, but was hampered by instructions from Lord Hillsborough, and later by Lord Lewisham. In addition, the former governor William Tryon left a political legacy of five major problems that plagued North Carolina. These problems were:

- the fiscal and psychological effects of the War of the Regulation;
- the unsettled and expensive dispute between North Carolina and South Carolina about their mutual boundary line;
- the struggle over the court law bills and the judiciary, especially the attachment of the property of debtors who had never lived in the province;
- the old quorum trouble in the House of Commons that caused conflict between the House and the governor; and
- the conflict over the selection of the chief personnel of the provincial government by the crown rather than through the assembly.

Martin's coat of arms

After the Governor's Palace in Newbern was attacked by Patriots on 24 April 1775, Martin sent his family to his in-laws' home in New York and took refuge on board the Royal Navy sloop-of-war HMS Cruizer, transferring his headquarters to Fort Johnston on the Cape Fear River. When the Patriot-authored Mecklenburg Resolves were published in May 1775, Martin sent a copy to England, which he described as "setting up a system of rule and regulation subversive of his majesty's government." Martin then requested a supply of arms and ammunition from General Thomas Gage in Boston. In July 1775, a plot instigated by Martin to arm black slaves to fight with the British against the Patriots was discovered. In retaliation, John Ashe led a group of Patriots to attack Fort Johnston on 20 July. Martin was forced to flee aboard Cruizer while the Ashe and his men destroyed the fort. Martin remained off the coast of North Carolina, directing movements of the Loyalists, whom he supplied with weapons brought from England.

== Later life and death ==
Following the failure of two attempts during the Carolina campaign to reestablish his administration, Martin, who was then in ill health due to fatigue, left for Long Island and then England. He died in London on 13 April 1786 and was buried at St George's, Hanover Square.

== Honours ==
Martin County, North Carolina, is named after him.

Government offices
Preceded by James Hasell; Acting	Governor of North Carolina; 1771–1776; In exile 1776–1783	Vacant American Revolution Title next held by Richard Caswell
