= Province of North Carolina =

Former British province in North America

- Province of Great Britain
- 1712–1776
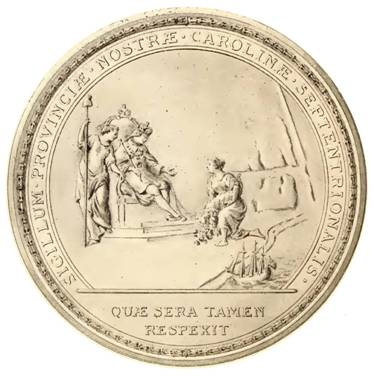
- British Red Ensign Seal

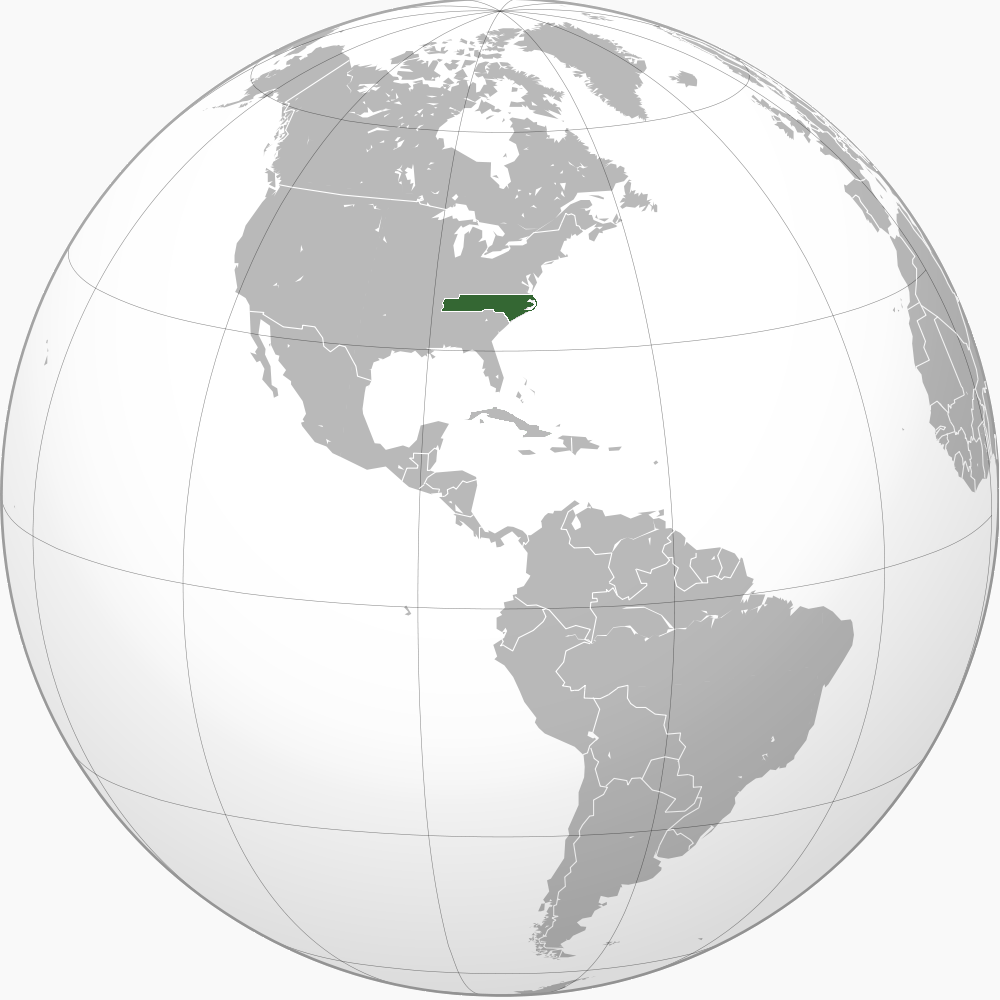
- Location of North Carolina in North America (Note: The Province of North Carolina in North America (included Tennessee District at that time))

Anthem
- "God Save the King" (Note: There was no authorized version of the national anthem as the words were a matter of tradition; only the first verse was usually sung. No statute had been enacted designating "God Save the King" as the official anthem. In the English tradition, such laws are not necessary; proclamation and usage are sufficient to make it the national anthem. "God Save the King" also served as the Royal anthem for certain royal colonies. The words King, he, him, his were replaced by Queen, she, her when the monarch was female.)
- Capital: Bath (1712–1722); Edenton (1722–1743); Brunswick (1743–1770); Newbern (1770–1776)
- Area
  - Coordinates: 35.75°N 83.00°W
- Government
  - Type: Proprietary colony (1712–1729); Royal colony (1729–1776)
  - Motto: Quae Sera Tamen Respexit (Latin) "Which, though late, looked upon me"
- Monarch
  - 1712–1714: Anne
  - 1714–1727: George I
  - 1727–1760: George II
  - 1760–1776: George III
- Governor
  - 1712: Edward Hyde (first)
  - 1771–1776: Josiah Martin (last)
- Legislature: General Assembly
  - Upper house: Council
  - Lower house: House of Burgesses
- Historical era: Georgian era
  - Partition of Carolina: January 24, 1712
  - Ceded to the crown of Great Britain: July 25, 1729
  - Declaration of Independence from Great Britain: July 4, 1776
Preceded by	Succeeded by
Province of Carolina	North Carolina
- Today part of: United States: North Carolina; Tennessee

The Province of North Carolina, formerly the County of Albemarle in Carolina, was a province of Great Britain in America that existed from 1712 to 1776. It was one of the five American colonies. The monarch of Great Britain was represented by the Governor of North Carolina, until the American colonies declared independence on July 4, 1776.

== Etymology ==
"Carolina" is taken from the Latin word for "Charles" (Carolus), named in honor of King Charles II, and was first named in the 1663 Royal Charter granting to Edward, Earl of Clarendon; George, Duke of Albemarle; William, Lord Craven; John, Lord Berkeley; Anthony, Lord Ashley; Sir George Carteret, Sir William Berkeley, and Sir John Colleton the right to settle lands in the present-day U.S. states of North Carolina, Tennessee, South Carolina, Georgia, Alabama, Mississippi, and Florida.

== History ==
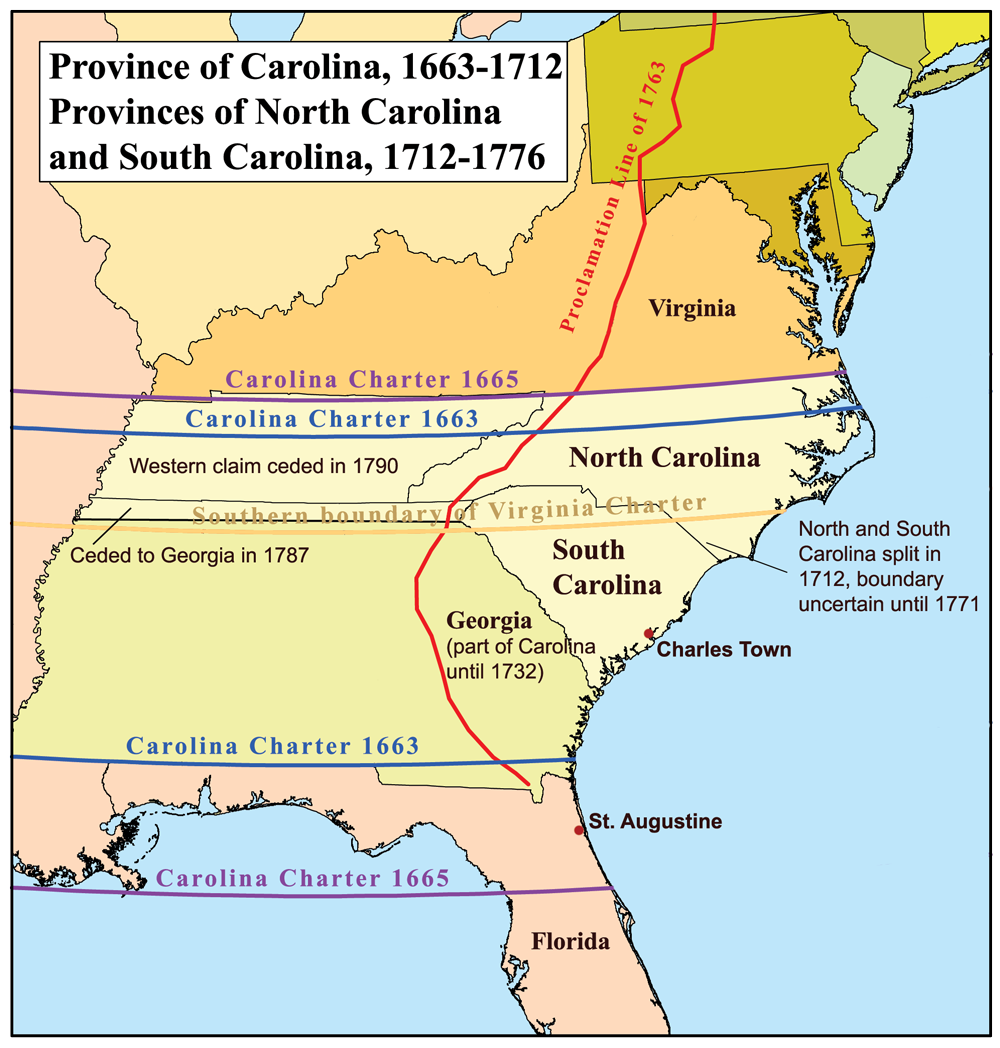
The Province of Carolina before and after the split into north and south

King Charles II granted the Charter of Carolina in 1663 for land south of the British Colony of Virginia and north of Spanish Florida. He granted the land to eight lords proprietor, namely Edward, Earl of Clarendon; George, Duke of Albemarle; William, Lord Craven; John, Lord Berkeley; Anthony, Lord Ashley; Sir George Carteret; Sir William Berkeley; and Sir John Colleton. Charles granted the land in return for their financial and political assistance in restoring him to the throne in 1660. The granted lands included all or part of the present-day U.S. states of North Carolina, Tennessee, South Carolina, Georgia, Alabama, Mississippi, and Florida.

The northern half of the Province of Carolina differed significantly from the southern half, and transportation and communication were difficult between the two regions, so a separate deputy governor was appointed to administer the northern region in 1691.

The partition of Carolina into the provinces of North and South Carolina was completed at a meeting of the lords proprietor held at Craven House in London on December 7, 1710, (Note: The Craven House at Drury Lane in London was named after William, Lord Craven. The five story house was demolished in 1809.) although the same proprietors continued to control both colonies. The first provincial governor of North Carolina was Edward Hyde. Unrest against the proprietors in South Carolina in 1719 led King George I to directly appoint a governor in that province, whereas the lords proprietor continued to appoint the governor of North Carolina. Both Carolinas became royal colonies in 1729, after the British government had tried for nearly 10 years to locate and buy out seven of the eight lords proprietor. The remaining one-eighth share of the province was retained by members of the Carteret family until 1776, part of the Province of North Carolina known as the Granville District.

In 1755 Benjamin Franklin, the Postmaster-General for the American colonies, appointed James Davis as the first postmaster of North Carolina colony at New Bern. In October of that year the North Carolina Assembly awarded Davis the contract to carry the mail between Wilmington, North Carolina and Suffolk, Virginia.

By the late eighteenth century, the tide of immigration to North Carolina from Virginia and the Pennsylvania began to swell. The Scots-Irish (Ulster Protestants) from present-day Northern Ireland were the largest immigrant group from the British Isles to the colonies before the American Revolution. Indentured servants, who arrived mostly in the seventeenth and eighteenth centuries, comprised the majority of English settlers prior to the Revolution. On the eve of the Revolution, North Carolina was the fastest-growing British colony in North America.

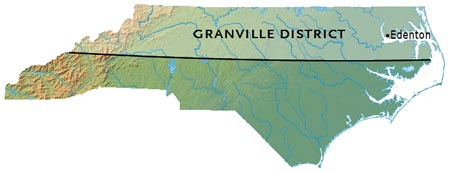
The Granville District

Differences in the settlement patterns of eastern and western North Carolina, or the low country and uplands, affected the political, economic, and social life of the state from the eighteenth until the twentieth century. The small family farms of the Piedmont contrasted sharply with the plantation economy of the coastal region, where wealthy planters grew tobacco and rice with slave labor. The Tidewater in eastern North Carolina was settled chiefly by immigrants from rural England and the Scottish Highlands. The upcountry of western North Carolina was settled chiefly by Scots-Irish, English and German Protestants, and the so-called cohee—poor, non-Anglican, independent farmers. During the Revolution, the English and Highland Scots of eastern North Carolina tended to remain loyal to the King because of longstanding business and personal connections with Great Britain. The English, Welsh, Scots-Irish, and German settlers of western North Carolina tended to favor American independence.

With no cities and very few towns or villages, the province was rural and thinly populated. Local taverns provided multiple services ranging from strong drink and beds for travelers to meeting rooms for politicians and businessmen. In a world sharply divided along lines of ethnicity, gender, race, and class, the tavern keepers' rum proved a solvent that mixed together all sorts of locals and travelers. The increasing variety of drinks on offer and the emergence of private clubs meeting in the taverns showed that genteel culture was spreading from London to the periphery of the English world. The courthouse was usually the most imposing building in a county. Jails were often an important part of the courthouse but were sometimes built separately. Some county governments built tobacco warehouses to provide a common service for their most important export crop.

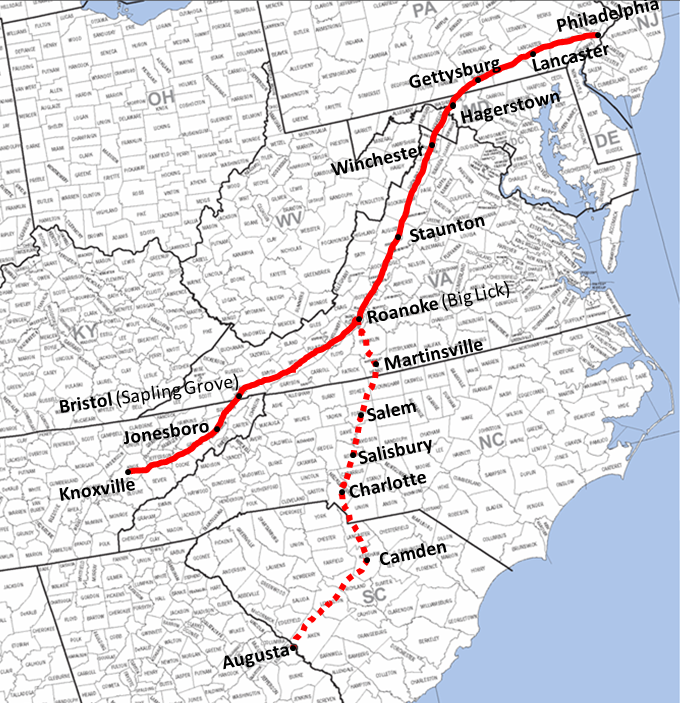
The Great Valley Road

Expansion westward began early in the eighteenth century from the provincial seats of power on the coast, particularly after the conclusion of the Tuscarora and Yamasee wars, in which the largest barrier was removed to provincial settlement farther inland. Settlement in large numbers became more feasible over the Appalachian Mountains after the French and Indian War and the accompanying Anglo-Cherokee War, in which the Cherokee and Catawba were effectively neutralized. King George III issued the Proclamation of 1763 in order to stifle potential conflict with Indians in that region, including the Overhill Cherokee. This barred any settlement near the headwaters of any rivers or streams that flowed westward towards the Mississippi River. It included several North Carolina rivers, such as the French Broad and Watauga. This proclamation was not strictly obeyed and was widely detested in North Carolina, but it somewhat delayed migration westward until after the Revolution.

Settlers continued to flow westwards in smaller numbers, despite the prohibition, and several trans-Appalachian settlements were formed. Most prominent was the Watauga Association, formed in 1772 as an independent territory within the bounds of North Carolina which adopted its own written constitution. Notable frontiersmen such as Daniel Boone traveled back and forth across the invisible proclamation line as market hunters, seeking valuable pelts to sell in eastern settlements, and many served as leaders and guides for groups who settled in the Tennessee River valley and the Kentucke County.

== Geography ==
The oldest counties were Albemarle County (1664–1689) and Bath County (1696–1739). During the period of 1668 to 1774, 32 counties were created. As western counties, such as Anson and Rowan counties were created, their western borders were not well defined and extended west as far as the Mississippi. Toward the end of this period, the boundaries were more well defined and extended to include the Cherokee lands in the west.

Two important maps of the province were produced: one by Edward Moseley in 1733, and another by John Collet in 1770. Moseley was surveyor general of North Carolina in 1710 and from 1723 to 1733. He was also the first provincial treasurer of North Carolina, starting in 1715. Moseley was responsible, with William Byrd, for surveying the boundary between North Carolina and Virginia in 1728. Other maps exist dating to the early period of the Age of Discovery that depict the coastline of the province along with that of South Carolina.

The ports for which there were customs agents in the Province of North Carolina included: Bath, Roanoke, Currituck Precinct, Brunswick (Cape Fear), and Beaufort (Topsail Inlet).

There were 52 new towns established in the Province of North Carolina between 1729 and 1775. Major towns during this period included: Bath (chartered in 1705), Brunswick (founded after 1726, destroyed during the Revolution), Campbellton (established in 1762), Edenton (chartered in 1712), Halifax (chartered in 1757), Hillsborough (1754), Newbern (settled in 1710, chartered in 1723), Salisbury (chartered in 1753), and Wilmington (founded in 1732, chartered in 1739 or 1740). Each of these nine major towns had a single representative in the North Carolina House of Burgesses in 1775. Campbellton and the town of Cross Creek (established in 1765) were combined in 1783 to form the town of Fayetteville.

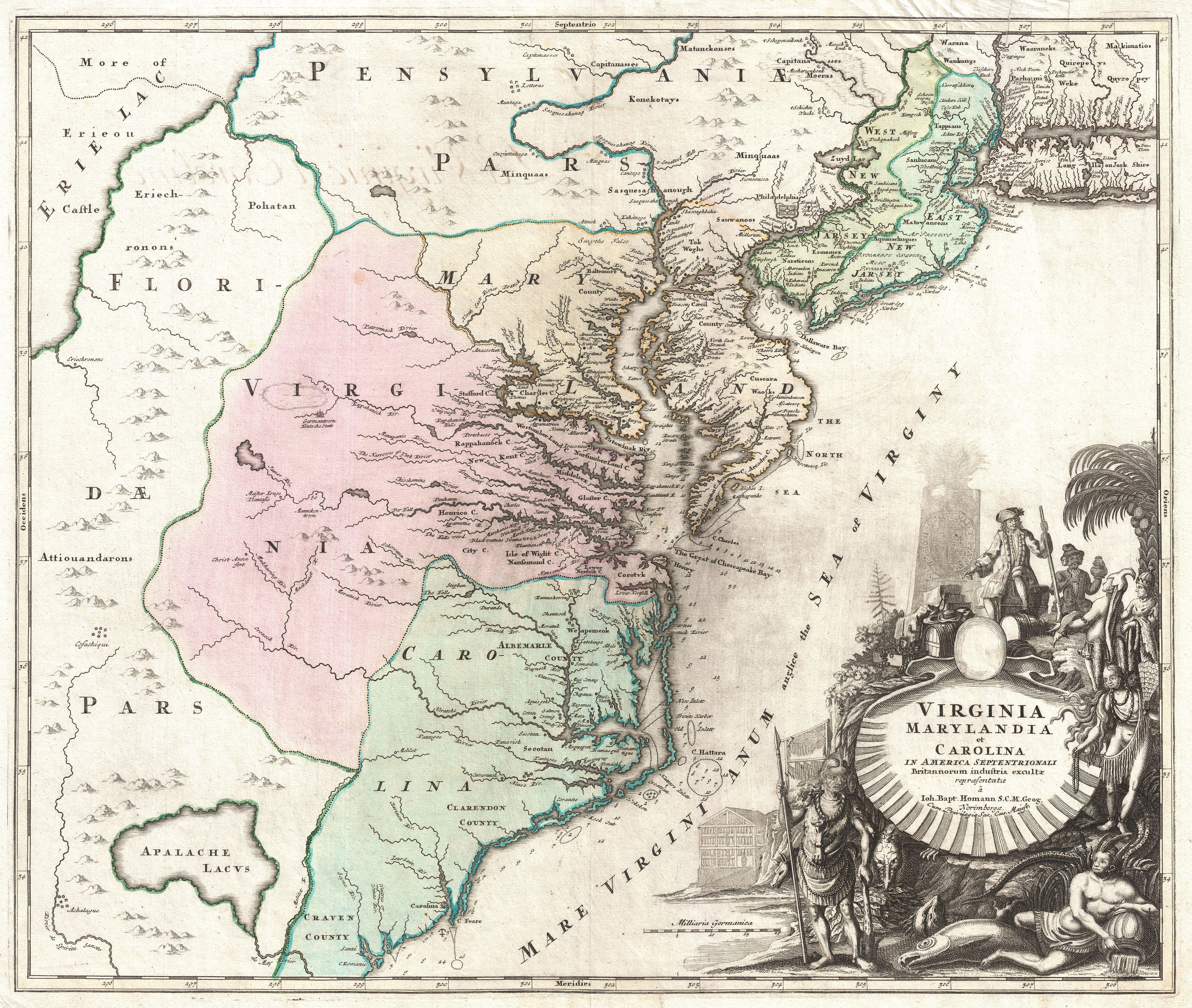
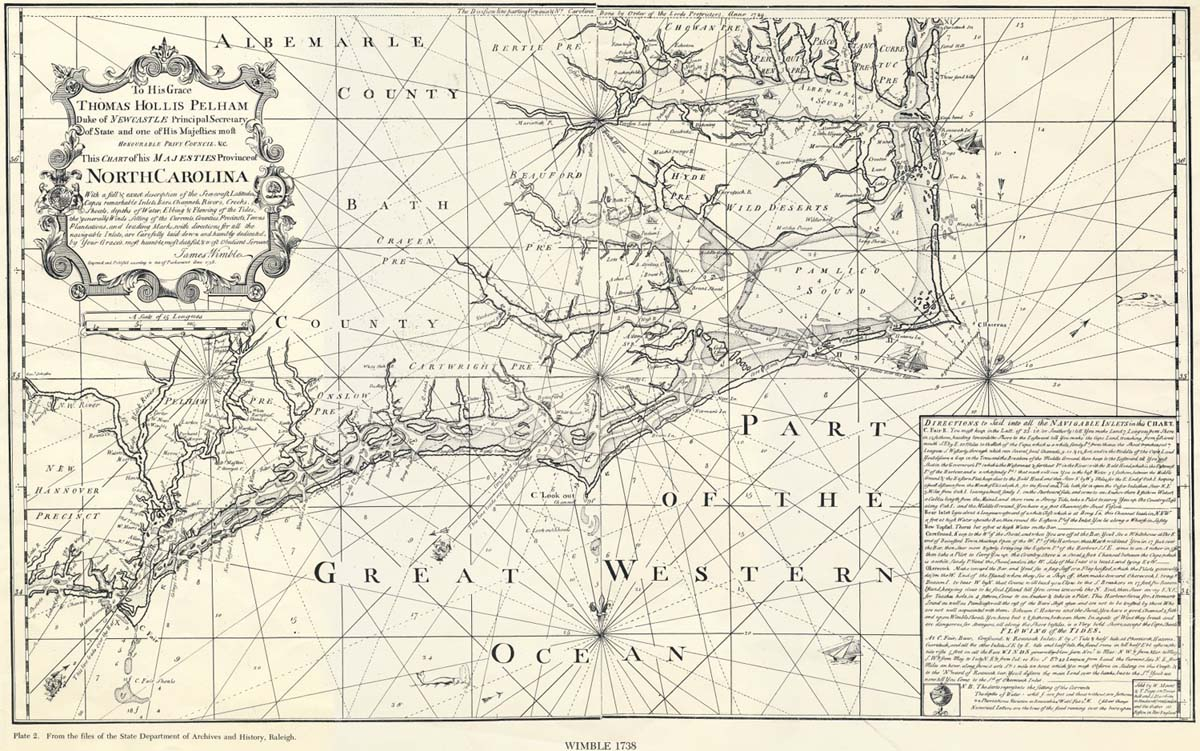
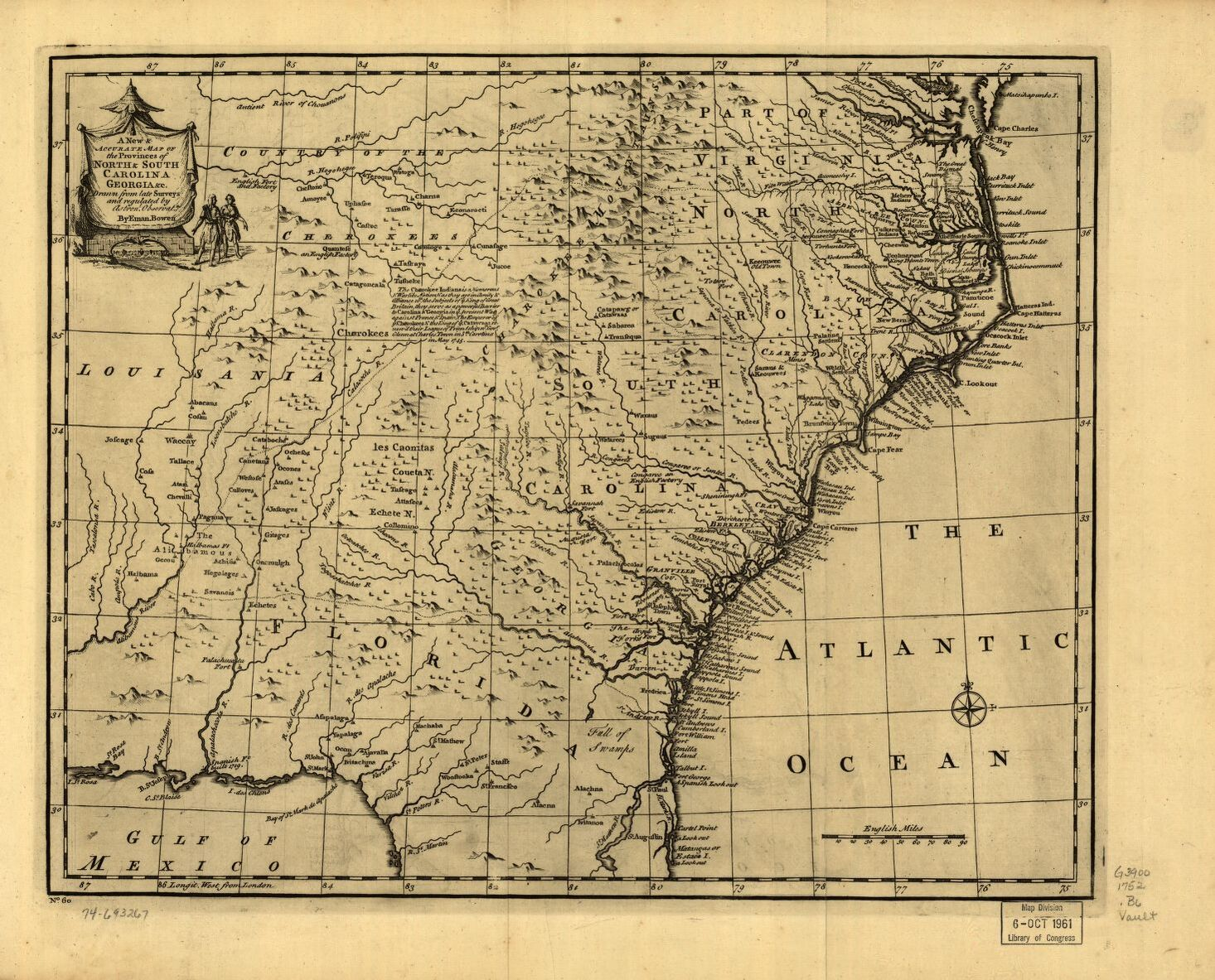
Map of Virginia, Maryland, and Carolina (1715)	Map of North Carolina (1738)	Map of North and South Carolina and Georgia (1752)

== Government ==
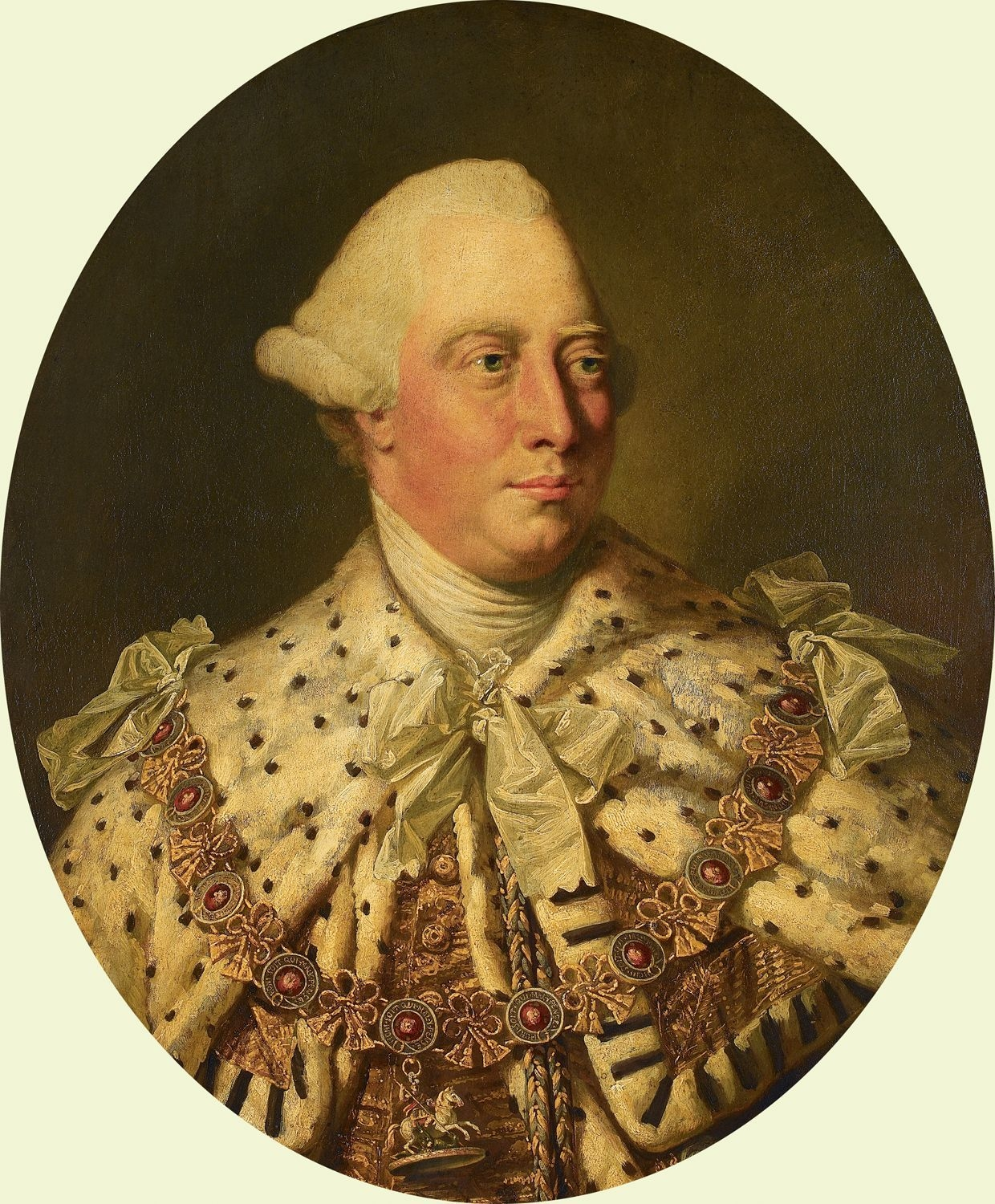
King George III, Monarch from 1760 to 1776 (last)

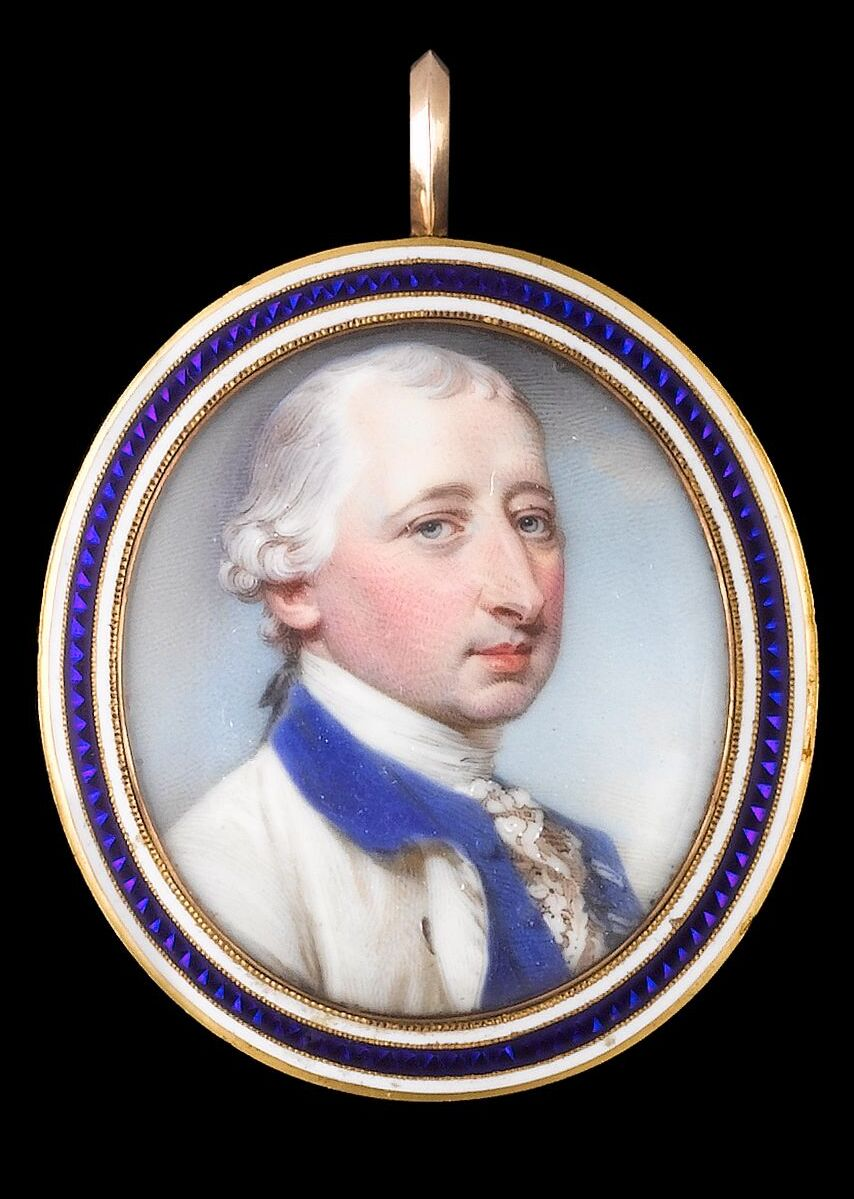
Josiah Martin, Governor from 1771 to 1776 (last)

There were two primary branches of government, the governor and his council and the assembly, called the House of Burgesses. All provincial officials were appointed by either the lords proprietor prior to 1728 or The King afterwards. The King received advice for appointment of the governor from the Secretary of State for the Southern Department. The governor was accountable to the Secretary of State and the Board of Trade. The governor was also responsible for commissioning officers and provisioning the provincial militia. Besides the governor, other provincial officials included a secretary, attorney general, surveyor general, the receiver general, Chief Justice, five Customs Collectors for each of the five ports in North Carolina, and a council. The Council advised the governor and also served as the upper house of the legislature. Members of the lower house of the legislature, the House of Burgesses, were elected from precincts (counties after 1736) and from districts (also called boroughs or towns, which were large centers of population).

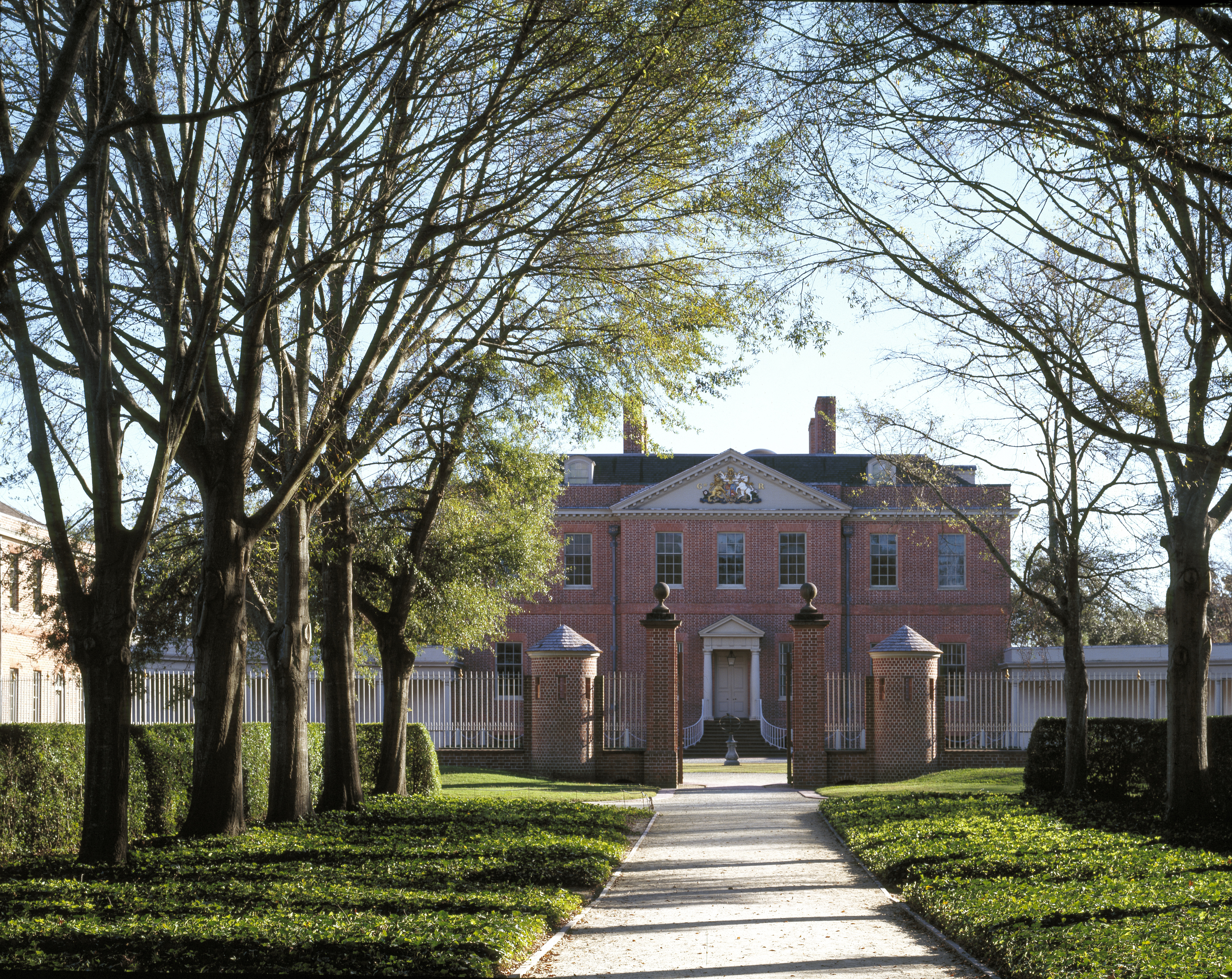
The Governor's Palace at Newbern, seat of the General Assembly of North Carolina

The eight provincial governors appointed by the King were:

1. Edward Hyde (1712)
2. Charles Eden (1714–1722)
3. George Burrington (1724–1725), (1731–1734)
4. Sir Richard Everard (1725–1731)
5. Gabriel Johnston (1734–1752)
6. Arthur Dobbs (1754–1764)
7. William Tryon (1764–1771)
8. Josiah Martin (1771–1776)

The last provincial council included the following members:

- Samuel Cornell
- William Dry
- George Mercer (Lieutenant Governor)
- James Hasell (Chief Baron of the Exchequer, Acting Governor in 1771)
- Martin Howard (Chief Justice)
- Alexander McCulloch
- Robert Palmer
- John Rutherfurd (Receiver General)
- Lewis Henry De Rosset
- John Sampson
- Samuel Strudwick (Clerk)
- Thomas McGuire (Attorney General)

Governor Martin issued a proclamation on April 8, 1775, dissolving the General Assembly after they presented a resolve endorsing the Continental Congress that was to be held in Philadelphia. The provincial council met for the last time onboard HMS Cruizer in the Cape Fear River on July 18, 1775, they believed that the "deluded people of this Province" would see their error and return to their allegiance to the King.

The Court Act of 1746 established a supreme court, initially known as the General Court, which sat twice a year at Newbern, consisting of a Chief Justice and three Associate Justices. The 14 chief justices of the Supreme Court appointed by the King included the following:

Incumbent	Tenure		Notes
Incumbent	Took office	Left office	Notes
Christopher Gale	1703	1731	interrupted by Tobias Knight and Frederick Jones
William Smith	1 Apr 1731	1731	left for England
John Palin	1731	18 Oct 1732	
William Little	18 Oct 1732	1734	died 1734
Daniel Hanmer	1734		
William Smith		1740	on return from England, died 1740
John Montgomery	1740		
Edward Moseley	1744	1749	
Enoch Hall	1749		
Eleazer Allen	1749		
James Hasell			name also spelled Hazel or Hazell
Peter Henley		1758	died 1758
Charles Berry	1760	1766	committed suicide, 1766
Martin Howard	1767	1775	Loyalist, forced to leave
1773–1777 No Courts held

== Demographics ==
Population
Year	1720	1730	1740	1750	1760	1770
Pop.	21,270	30,000	51,760	72,984	110,442	197,200
±%	—	+41.0%	+72.5%	+41.0%	+51.3%	+78.6%
Source: 1720–1760; 1770

Preceded by Northern part of the Province of Carolina; 1663–1712	Province of North Carolina; 1712–1776	Succeeded by State of North Carolina; 1776–present
