= Martin Howard =

American politician and jurist (1725–1781)

The Honourable Martin Howard
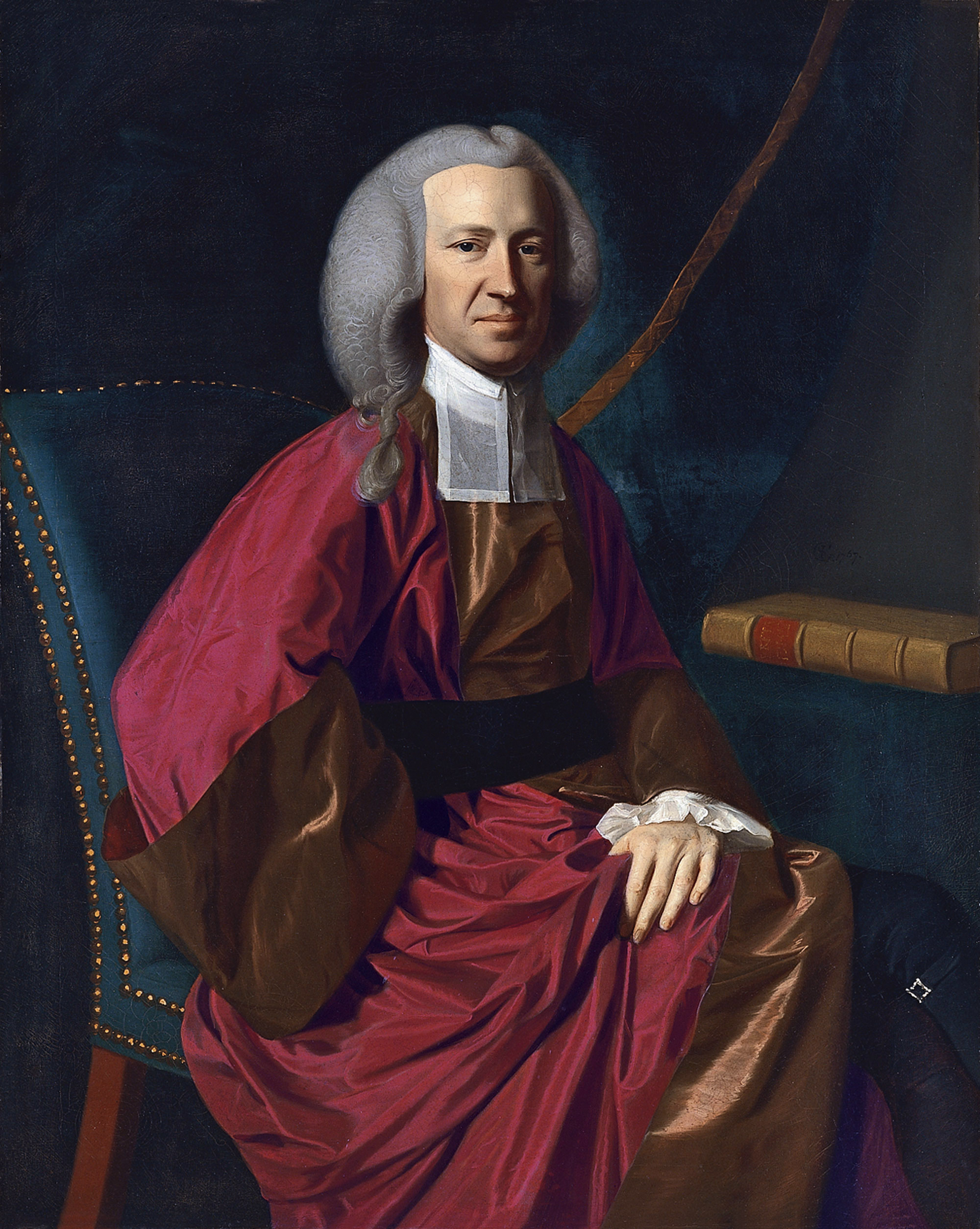
- Portrait, 1767

Chief Justice of North Carolina
- In office 23 January 1767 – 4 July 1776; In exile 4 July 1776 – November 1781
- Monarch: George III
- Preceded by: Charles Berry
- Succeeded by: Vacant (American Revolution) (Title next held by John L. Taylor)

Member of the Rhode Island General Assembly from Newport

Delegate from Rhode Island to the Albany Congress
- In office 19 June 1754 – 11 July 1754

Personal details
- Born: c. 1725
- Died: November 1781 (aged 55–56) Middlesex, England
- Resting place: Old Burial Ground, King's Road, London, England
- Spouses: Ann Conklin (m. 1749; died 1764) Abigail Greenlief (m. 1767)
- Children: 4
- Parent: Martin Howard Sr. (father)
- Known for: Founding St. John's Lodge, No. 3, A.F. & A.M., New Bern, North Carolina

Martin Howard (c. 1725 – November 1781) was a colonial official who served as the 14th and last British chief justice of North Carolina from 1767 to 1776, and in exile until his death in 1781.

== Early life ==
Howard was born about 1725 to Martin Howard Sr. Although raised a Anabaptist, he became a regular attendant at the Anglican Trinity Church at Newport, Rhode Island.

== Career ==
A lawyer, politician, physiocrat and skeptical philosopher, Howard served as a delegate from Rhode Island to the Albany Congress. Elected to the Assembly in 1756, he served on the committee that revised the colony's laws in 1760. In 1765, Howard was appointed by the Crown, jointly with Dr. Moffatt and Augustus Johnson, stamp masters for Rhode Island. He was the only prominent American to publicly support the Stamp Act of 1765, in his pamphlet "A Letter from a Gentleman at Halifax to His Friend in Rhode Island," (1765) in which he asserted that Parliament had the power to impose taxes on the colonies. They came under attack and their houses were burned. Tax protesters carried his effigy through the streets, hoisting it 15 feet high with a noose around the neck. Howard fled to England and was rewarded by the Crown with an appointment as Chief Justice of North Carolina at a salary of £600. A Loyalist, Howard returned to England when the American Revolution broke out.
