= James Hasell =

British colonial official

His Excellency James Hasell

Governor of North Carolina Acting
- In office 1 July 1771 – 12 August 1771
- Monarch: George III
- Preceded by: William Tryon
- Succeeded by: Josiah Martin

James Hasell was a British colonial official who served as the acting governor of North Carolina in 1771.

== Early life ==
In 1763 when Governor Arthur Dobbs was absent from the colony on a visit to South Carolina, Hassel, as senior member of the Council, was in charge on the government. Hasell also had other experience in colonial affairs as judge of the Court of Oyer and Terminer (a court to hear and determine cases) for Craven, Carteret, Johnston, Beaufort, and Hyde counties. He lived at Belgrange on the lower Cape Fear.

In 1766 Governor Tryon wrote the British Board of Trade that he had given the commission of chief justice to James Hasell and described him as "senior member of his Majesty's Council, next to the President. He is much the gentleman, has acted in this office at different times seven years to general satisfaction: has been always esteemed a steady friend to the measures of government...."

== Acting governor of North Carolina ==
Coat of Arms of James Hasell

After Governor Tryon left North Carolina to become governor of New York, the Council met on July 1, 1771, and Hasell took over office of the governor until the appointment of Josiah Martin, the last of the British governors. Governor Martin recommended that Hasell be made lieutenant governor in the place of Lieutenant Governor George Mercer, thinking that Mercer was to be appointed governor of Ohio. Though this appointment did not materialize, Mercer, remaining in England, nonetheless kept the office in the colony. During the course of this year, he also helped to found and establish the present-day Queens University of Charlotte (then known as the classical school Queens Museum).

James Hasell (sometimes spelled Hassell) was on board HMS Cruizer on the Cape Fear River with Governor Josiah Martin as the council met in its final meeting that called an end to the Province of North Carolina. The record of that meeting notes that Hasell said that the governor should "take every lawful measure in his power to suppress the 'unnatural rebellion' now fomenting".

== Legacy ==
Hasell was apparently a book collector. His "lost" library was discovered in the early part of the 20th century in one of the old houses on the Sound near Wilmington. Described as "all that remains of North Carolina's oldest library", the collection contained a number of first editions, and many autographed by the leading men of the period.

Government offices
Preceded by William Tryon	Governor of North Carolina; Acting; 1771	Succeeded by Josiah Martin
