= Henry Ballow =

English lawyer and author

Henry Ballow or Bellewe (1707–1782), was a lawyer, and held posts in the Exchequer which exempted him from the necessity of practice. He is reputed as the probable author of A Treatise upon Equity, first published in 1737 and running to at least five editions.

== Biography ==
Details of Ballow's life are sketchy. According to the Oxford Dictionary of National Biography, he was probably born on 3 May 1704 in Westminster; educated at Magdalene College, Cambridge, admitted to Lincoln's Inn on 27 January 1721, and called to the bar on 6 November 1728. He was a deputy chamberlain of the exchequer, a post acquired either because his father before him was a deputy chamberlain; or because of the influence of the Townshends, in whose family he was some time a tutor. He was a friend of Mark Akenside, the poet, who was at one time intimate with Charles Townshend. Samuel Johnson says that he learned what law he knew chiefly from 'a Mr. Ballow, a very able man'.

Ballow died in London on 26 July 1782 aged 75.

Malone, who calls him Thomas Ballow, attributes to him A Treatise Upon Equity. A copy in the British Museum, dated 1750, and assigned in the catalogue to Henry Ballow, belonged to Francis Hargrave. A note in Hargrave's handwriting states that it was ascribed to Mr. Bellewe, and first published in 1737. Hargrave adds that Mr. Bellewe was a man of learning and devoted to classical literature, and that his manuscript law collections were in the possession of Charles Pratt, 1st Earl Camden, who was his executor and literary legatee. John Anthony Fonblanque, however, in his edition of the treatise on equity (1794), thinks that the book could not have been written by a man of less than ten years' standing, and that Ballow, who could have been only thirty years of age at the time of its publication, would have openly claimed it if it had been his. Fonblanque calls him Henry Ballow. A Henry Ballow, possibly father of this Ballow, was deputy chamberlain in the exchequer in 1703.

Hawkins gives the following anecdote: 'There was a man of the name of Ballow who used to pass his evenings at Tom's Coffee House in Devereux Court, then the resort, of some of the most eminent men for learning. Ballow was a man of deep and extensive learning, but of vulgar manners, and, being of a splenetic temper, envied Akenside for the eloquence he displayed in his conversation. Moreover, he hated him for his republican principles. One evening at the coffee house a dispute between these two persons rose so high, that for some expression uttered by Ballow, Akenside thought himself obliged to demand an apology, which not being able to obtain, he sent his adversary a challenge in writing. Ballow, a little deformed man, well known as a saunterer in the park, about Westminster, and in the streets between Charing Cross and the houses of parliament, though remarkable for a sword of an unusual length, which he constantly wore when he went abroad, had no inclination for fighting, and declined an answer. The demand for satisfaction was followed by several attempts on the part of Akenside to see Ballow at his lodgings, but he kept close till, by the interposition of friends, the difference could be adjusted. By his conduct in this business Akenside acquired but little reputation for courage, for the accommodation was not brought about by any concessions of his adversary, but by a resolution from which neither of them would depart, for one would not fight in the morning, nor the other in the afternoon.'
