= Samuel Martin (Camelford MP) =

British politician (1714-1788)

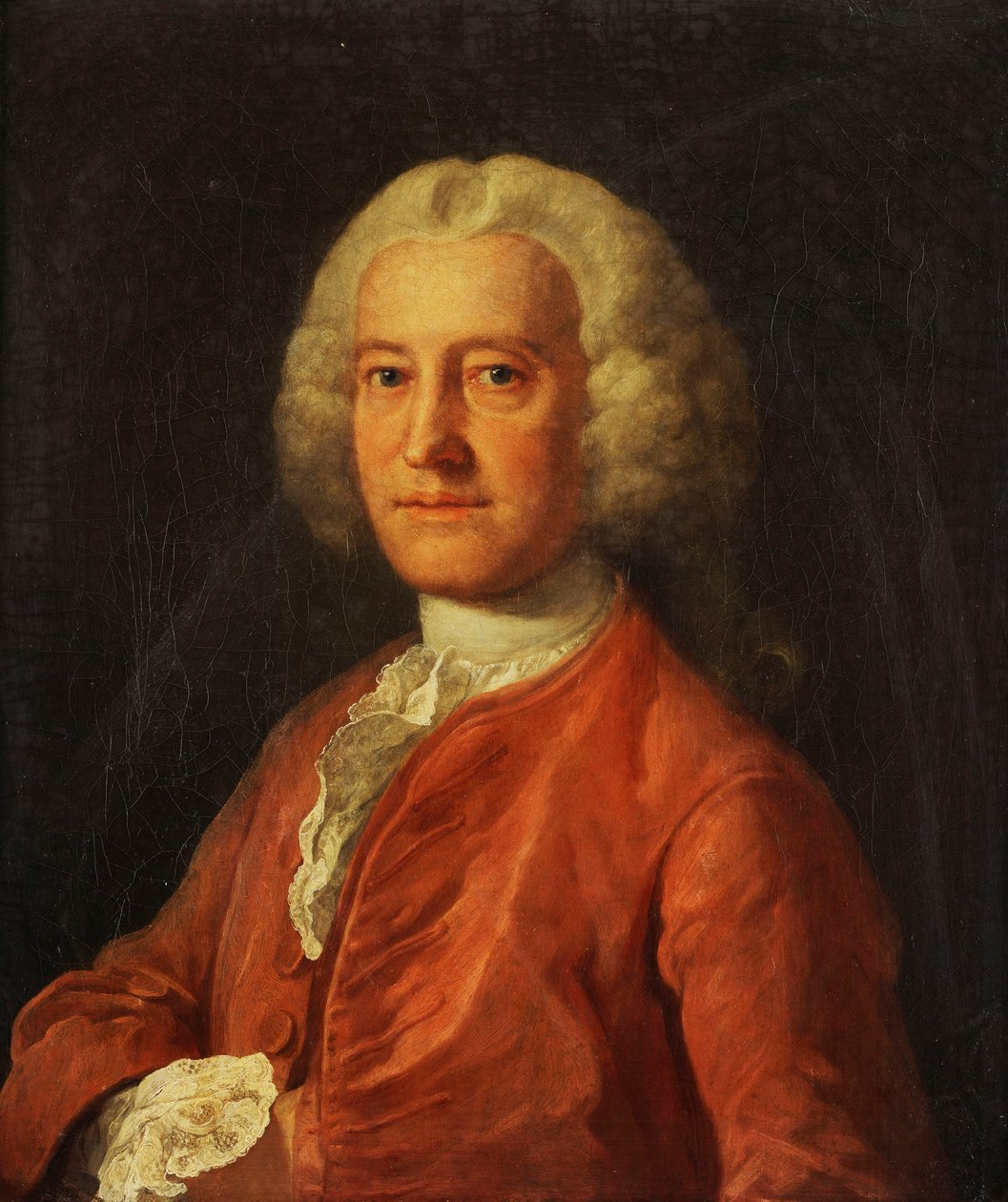
Portrait by William Hogarth, c. 1763

Samuel Martin (1 September 1714 – 20 November 1788) was a British politician who represented Camelford and Hastings in the House of Commons of Great Britain between 1747 and 1774.

== Family ==
He was born on the West Indies island of Antigua, the son of Samuel Martin, the leading plantation owner on the island. He had three notable half-brothers: Sir Henry Martin, 1st Baronet (1733–1794), for many years naval commissioner at Portsmouth and Comptroller of the Navy, and the father of Thomas Byam Martin; Josiah Martin (1737–1786), governor of North Carolina from 1771 to 1776, and William Byam Martin, a merchant and official of the East India Company who returned to England as wealthy nabob. His full-sister Henrietta (Rilla) Fitzgerald was the mother of poet William Thomas Fitzgerald and mother-in-law of equity lawyer John Fonblanque KC MP for Camelford 1802–1806. Martin's will seems to reveal the existence of the mother of his natural child or children.

== Parliament ==
Martin sat as Member of Parliament (MP) for the Cornish borough of Camelford from 1747 until 1768. He was a protégé of an important British politician, Henry Bilson Legge, who was three times Chancellor of the Exchequer. When Legge was first made Chancellor, Martin served as his secretary from April 1754 until November 1755.

Martin, although he lacked major political talents and was mistrusted by Thomas Pelham-Holles, 1st Duke of Newcastle, had a capacity for hard work and dealing with administration. This led to his being appointed Secretary to the Treasury for the first time in November 1756, during Legge's second Chancellorship. This was a post which was more administrative than political in nature, although Martin was an MP and the appointment was a patronage one. In April 1757, he left office together with his political allies, led by William Pitt the Elder.

When Legge was restored to the Chancellorship for the third time in July 1757, Martin was the only person who had gone out of office in April who was not given a new job in the Pitt-Newcastle Coalition. Having failed to obtain an office in the King's service, Martin was compensated by being appointed Treasurer to the Princess Dowager of Wales Augusta of Saxe-Gotha (mother of the future King George III of the United Kingdom) in October 1757, an office he retained until 8 February 1772. In 1760 King George III succeeded to the throne and Martin was able in the following year to transfer his political loyalty from Legge (who was becoming less prominent in public life) to the King's favourite John Stuart, 3rd Earl of Bute.

In April 1758, Martin became Secretary to the Treasury for the second time and continued in that office until April 1763. After leaving the Treasury in 1763, Martin largely withdrew from public life. He declined to seek re-election to Parliament in 1768, unless the government paid all his election expenses. Although this proposal was not accepted, he was returned again for Hastings until 1774.

== Duel with John Wilkes ==
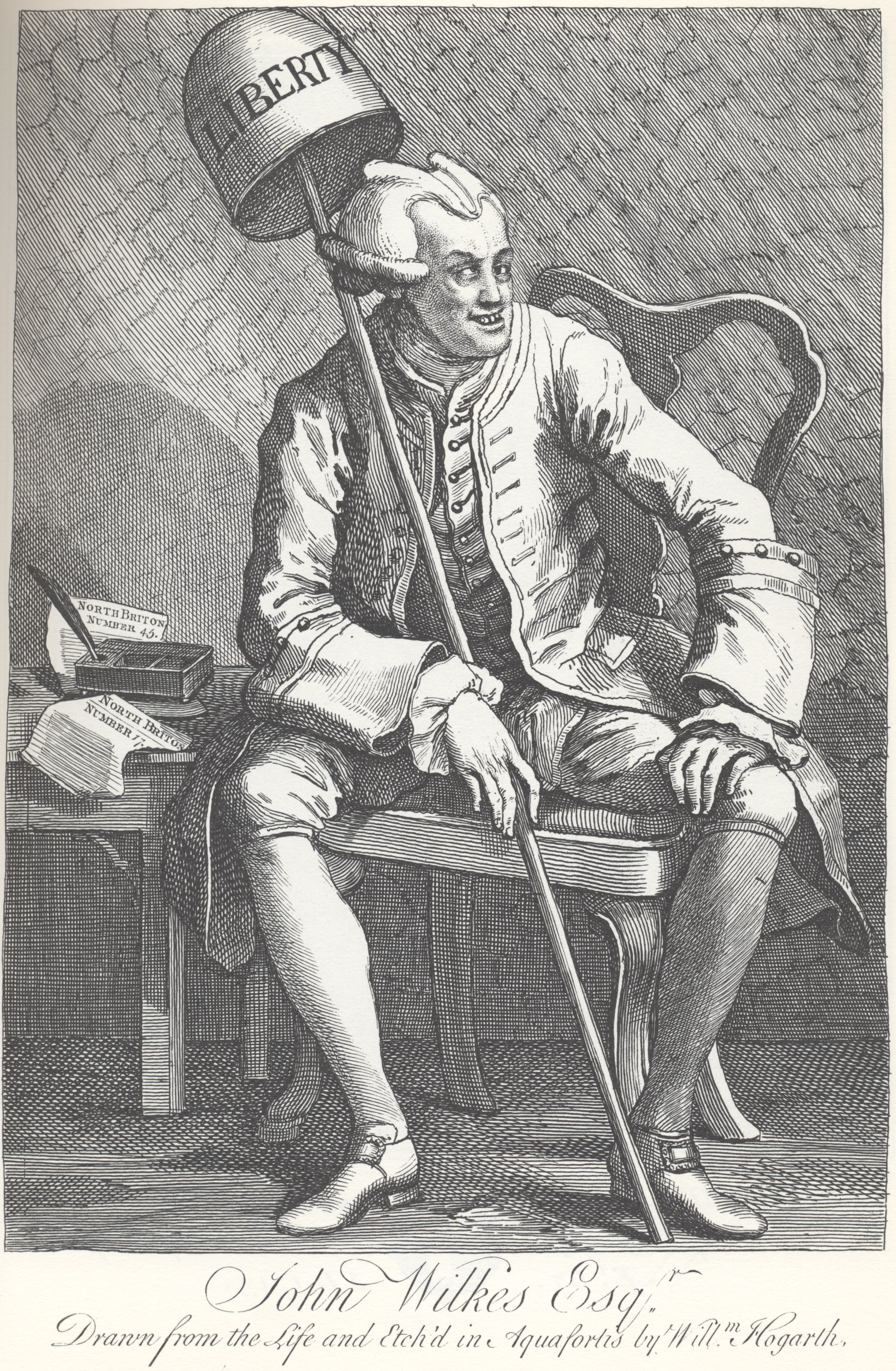
Satirical engraving of Wilkes by William Hogarth

The Times of Wednesday 26 November 1788 reported:

"Last week died Samuel Martin Esq a gentleman well known in the political world and particularly from his having fought a duel about five and twenty years ago with Mr Wilkes".

This pistol duel took place in Hyde Park on 16 November 1763. John Wilkes was severely wounded in the stomach, ultimately fled to Paris and was pronounced an outlaw.

Parliament of Great Britain
Preceded by The Earl of Inchiquin; Charles Montagu	Member of Parliament for Camelford; 1747–1768; With: The Earl of Londonderry 1747–1754; John Lade 1754–1759; Bartholomew Burton 1759–1768	Succeeded by Charles Phillips; William Wilson
Preceded by James Brudenell; William Ashburnham	Member of Parliament for Hastings; 1768–1774; With: William Ashburnham	Succeeded by Viscount Palmerston; Charles Jenkinson
