= William Thomas Fitzgerald =

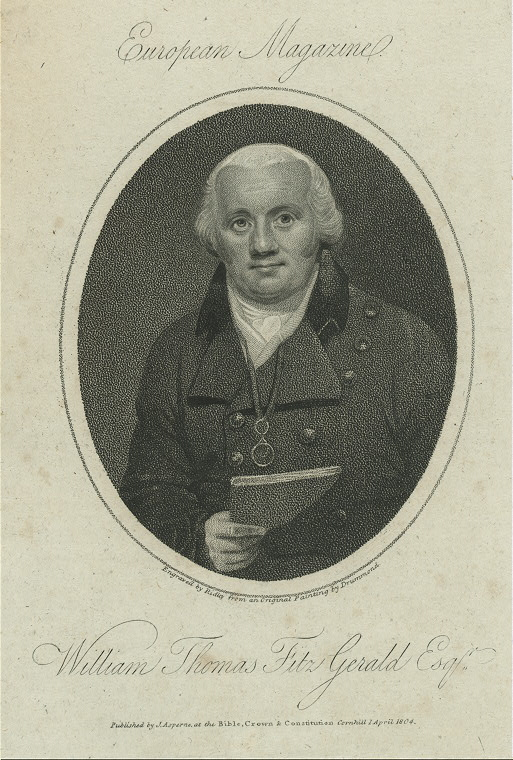
William Thomas Fitzgerald

William Thomas Fitzgerald (13 April 1759 – 9 July 1829) was an Irish/British poet.

== Life ==
Fitzgerald was the son of Colonel John Austen (or Anster) Fitzgerald of the Dutch service and Henrietta Martin, daughter of an Antigua planter and sister of Samuel Martin MP. Fitzgerald's own sister married barrister John Anthony Fonblanque. The family were linked to the Fitzgerald family of Munster.

Educated at Greenwich, the Royal College of Navarre in the University of Paris and the Inner Temple where his tutor was Vicary Gibbs he married very late in life to Maria Howorth in December 1826. It appears only one of their children was born after this marriage. They were the parents of the Victorian painter John Anster Fitzgerald.

Employed until about 1805 in the Navy pay-office Fitzgerald became subject to asthma' for the last 30 years of his life and suffered from dropsy. These complaints made his movements lethargic. He was long a member of the committee of the Literary Fund and later one of its vice-presidents. A close friend of William Viscount Dudley and Ward whose wife, Julia, also had Caribbean ties Fitzgerald died at Dudley Grove Paddington 9 July 1829 aged 70.

== Poetry ==
He has been described as "one of the foremost loyalist versifiers of his day". He wrote patriotic poetry during the Napoleonic Wars including Nelson's Triumph (1798) and Nelson's Tomb (1806).

=== Byron ===
William Cobbett nicknamed Fitzgerald the "Small Beer Poet." Lord Byron mentioned him in the opening line of his English Bards and Scotch Reviewers:

Still must I hear? — shall hoarse Fitzgerald bawl
His creaking couplets in a tavern hall....

Byron was mocking Fitzgerald's practice of reciting one of his poems each year, at the annual dinner of the Literary Fund, held at the Freemasons' Tavern. Fitzgerald replied to Byron, though not publicly; in a copy of English Bards he wrote:

I find Lord Byron scorns my Muse,
Our Fates are ill agreed;
The Verse is safe, I can't abuse
Those lines, I never read.

This copy of the poem somehow came into Byron's possession, and he added a verse reply of his own, dismissing Fitzgerald as a "scribbler."

Fitzgerald was also parodied in the Rejected Addresses of James and Horace Smith (1812); indeed, he suffers the sad fate of being remembered for inspiring the satires of Byron and the Smiths, rather than for his own writings.
