= Militia (British Empire) =

Paramilitary forces of colonial Britain

Gorget of a Jamaica Militia officer made in 1810

The Militia of the British Dominions, Self-Governing Colonies, and Crown Colonies were the principal military forces of the dominions and the self-governing colonies (those with elected local legislatures) and crown colonies (those without elected local legislatures, and ruled directly by its appointed governors and councils) of the British Empire.

== Background ==
The English had raised militia forces in their colonies in the New World immediately upon establishing them in the first decade of the 17th century. Whereas militias in England remained little used, outside the period of the English Civil Wars, during the following century, those in the North American colonies were to play significant roles. In many actions fought with Native Americans and European rivals, the militia were the primary English force in the field, as professional full-time military forces were usually far away. Even when the English colonies around the world became the British Empire, and regular forces began to become available for garrison duty, militias were still a vital part of Great Britain's military power in the Americas, and British victory over Spain and France during the Seven Years' War, and its resulting hegemony in North America, could not have been realised without the colonial militias and their Native allies. It was the presence of their militia that allowed the thirteen American colonies to launch the secessionist American War of Independence.

== Australasia ==
The colonies of Australia did not have militia, nor officially did New Zealand.

In 1843 a local militia that had been formed in Wellington without official sanction was immediately disbanded.

== Bermuda ==
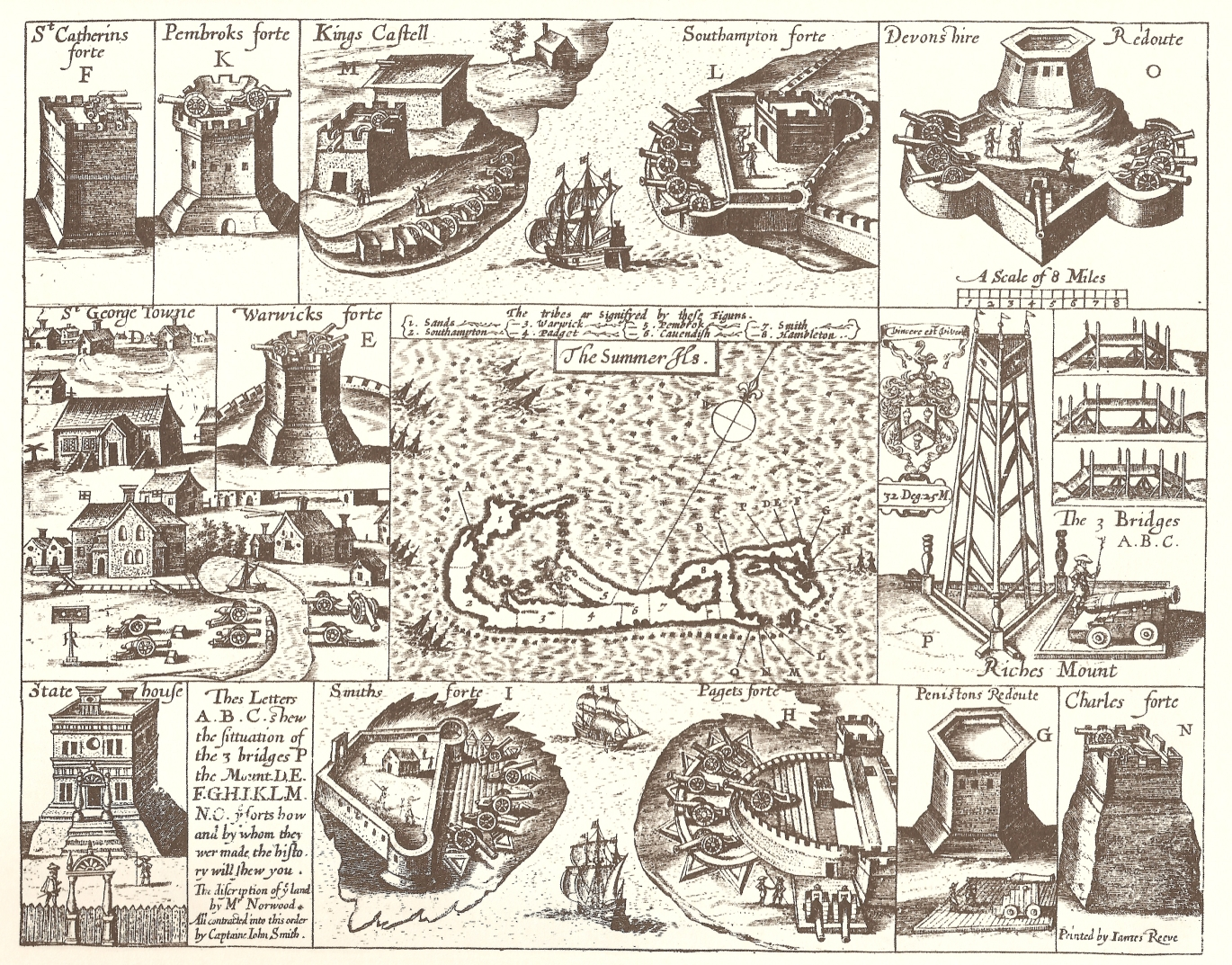
The Castle Islands Fortifications and other public buildings in Bermuda c. 1624. Construction beginning in 1612, these were the first stone fortifications, with the first coastal artillery batteries, built by England in the New World, and were manned by volunteers and the Militia 'til taken over by the regular British Army following the American War of Independence.

In the Somers Isles, or Bermuda (originally named Virgineola), a self-governed (rather than Crown) colony settled in 1609 (as a result of the shipwreck of the Sea Venture, the flagship of the Virginia Company of London, and originally considered part of the Virginia Colony), with no native population, the Militia followed a trajectory more like that in Britain, finally becoming moribund after the War of 1812, by when the build-up of regular forces had removed the demand for the militia. Nevertheless, during the first century of its settlement, Bermuda's militia had remained the colony's sole defence, manning its fortifications and coastal batteries and calling up all available manpower in times of war.

Large numbers of Irish prisoners of war and civilians were transported to Bermuda after the Cromwellian conquest of Ireland, where they were highly antagonistic to the English population. In 1661, the Bermudan government alleged that a plot was being hatched by a conspiratorial alliance of blacks and Irish to kill all the English populace on the island. The Irish were perceived as the chief instigators of this plot by the Bermudan government. Governor William Sayle tried to prevent such an occurrence from taking place by issuing three edicts: the first was that a nightly watch would be raised throughout the colony; second, that all slaves and indentured servants in Bermuda be disarmed of their weapons; and third, that any gathering of two or more slaves or indentured servants be dispersed by whipping (a ban was also placed on the further transportation of Irish prisoners of war and civilians to Bermuda).

Enslaved Bermudians continued to serve in the colonial militia, however, which was to lead a unique judgment on their rights as British subjects. By the 18th century, virtually all Bermudian men were engaged in the maritime trades, including building and crewing ships. The colony's dependence on its seamen was such that the Royal Navy excluded them from impressment, to which all other seamen in the British Empire were liable. Perennially short of manpower, the crews of Bermuda's merchant fleet (most of which turned to privateering whenever war broke out) were required, by local law, to contain a percentage of black sailors, most of whom were enslaved. British law at the time required that all crewmen of British vessels be British subjects, although the status of the enslaved Bermudan population remained unclear. Following the arrest of a Bermudian vessel by a Royal Navy warship due to its enslaved crewmembers, Bermudian ship owners protested to the courts that their service in the militia meant that Bermuda's slaves should be considered British subjects, and this view was upheld by the courts.

Bermuda's seasonal occupants of the Turks Islands also raised militias there, as their lucrative salt trade invited attacks from enemies, foreign (France and Spain) and domestic (the Bahamas). The fortifications built in Bermuda by the militia (including the Castle Islands Fortifications), starting in 1612, remain the oldest English colonial structures in the Americas, as well as the first stone fortifications, the first coastal artillery, and the oldest surviving fortifications built by the English in the New World. The militia manned these fortifications with standing bodies of artillerymen until the fortifications were taken over by the regular British Army following the American War of Independence, with some, like Fort St. Catherine's, used well into the 20th Century.

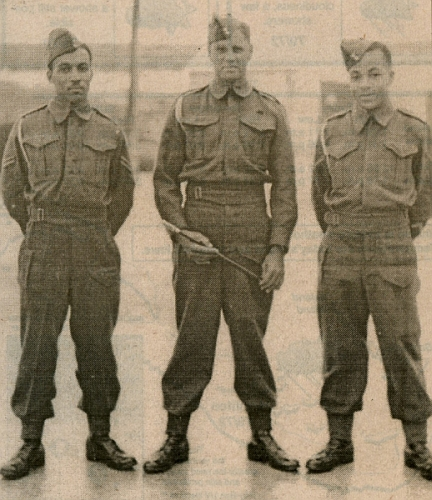
Warrant Officer and NCOs of the Bermuda Militia Artillery at St. David's Battery ca. 1944

With the build up of regular forces of the Bermuda Garrison, the Parliament of Bermuda allowed the Militia Act to lapse following the War of 1812 as the Militia had come to be seen as superfluous. The national (i.e., British) government was unable to compel the colonial government to raise reserve forces again until the 1890s, when the Bermuda Militia Artillery (BMA) and the Bermuda Volunteer Rifle Corps (BVRC) were raised (the latter being a Volunteer Force, rather than Militia, unit). These would be joined in the 1930s by the Bermuda Militia Infantry (BMI) and the Bermuda Volunteer Engineers (BVE). The BMA (a sub-unit of the Royal Artillery) and BVRC, which were embodied for the duration of the First World War and each sent two contingents to the Western Front, were both re-organised as Territorial units in the 1920s but their names were not modified to reflect this. The BMI and BVE were raised as territorials, and their names were always misnomers. All four were embodied for the duration of the Second World War, sending contingents and individuals to parent corps or other forces or units overseas. The 1949 Defence Act re-organised the Bermudian territorials, with only the BMA and the BVRC retained (the latter renamed the Bermuda Rifles). The Bermuda Militia Artillery (which converted to infantry in 1953, but retained the same name and continued to be badged as Royal Artillery) and Bermuda Rifles amalgamated in 1965 to form the Bermuda Regiment (since 2015, the Royal Bermuda Regiment).

== British West Indies ==
- Anguilla Militia
- Antigua Militia
- Bahamas Militia
- Barbados Militia
- British Guiana Militia
- Grenada Militia
- Jamaica Militia
- Jamaica Militia Artillery
- Montserrat Militia
- Nevis Militia
- Prince Regent's Royal Honduras Militia
- St. Christopher Militia (St. Kitts Militia)
- St. Vincent Militia
- Tobago Militia
- Trinidad Militia
- Virgin Islands Militia

== Canada ==
Militia units in Canada dates back to New France when French units were formed after 1669. The Companies of Canadian Volunteers were raised for the Invasion of Quebec 1775. The Companies of Canadian would become a unit of three companies leading French Canadian troops in 1777 and remained active until 1783.

The British colonial militia units in Canada were most notable during the War of 1812 and remained in use into late 19th Century (last enrollment in 1873) and officially ending in 1950.
