= Albany Fonblanque =

Albany William Fonblanque (1793 – 13 October 1872) was an English journalist, and by his own example a reformer of the journalist's profession.

== Family ==
Fonblanque, descended from a French Huguenot family was born in London. His grandfather, John de Grenier Fonblanque, had been a banker naturalised in England under the name Fonblanque; his son, John Anthony Fonblanque, was Albany's father. Albany's mother, Frances Caroline Fitzgerald, was a granddaughter of Colonel Samuel Martin of Antigua, West Indies and niece of Samuel Martin. Her brother was the poet William Thomas Fitzgerald.

Albany Fonblanque married Caroline Keane. They had a daughter and three sons.

=== Education ===
Fonblanque was sent to Tonbridge School and then to the Royal Arsenal, Woolwich, to prepare for a career in the Royal Engineers. However, his health fell short and his studies were suspended. On his recovery he studied law, with a view to being called to the bar. At the age of 19 (in 1812), he began writing for newspapers and soon gained attention for the boldness and liberality of his opinions and for the superiority of his style amid what Macaulay, when speaking of him, called the "rant and twaddle" of the daily and weekly press. While he shared in all the political struggles of this eventful period, he also studied classical and political philosophy for at least six hours a day. This regime led to his health breaking down again, but he continued to write regularly for newspapers and reviews and make a reasonable living.

From 1820 to 1830, Fonblanque was employed on the staff of The Times and the Morning Chronicle, whilst contributing to the Examiner to the London Magazine and the Westminster Review.

== The Examiner ==
In 1826, Fonblanque became political commentator for The Examiner, a weekly newspaper founded by Leigh and John Hunt in 1808. In 1828 the paper was purchased by Rev. Dr. Fellowes, author of the Religion of the Universe and other works, and given over to Fonblanque's complete control. For 17 years up to 1847, he sustained the high character for political independence and literary ability that The Examiner had gained under the direction of Leigh Hunt and his brother John, and even compelled his political opponents to acknowledge some delight in the boldness and brightness of the wit he directed against them.

When it was proposed that supporters of the paper should facilitate a reduction in its price by paying their subscriptions ten years in advance, they were joined by Edward Bulwer-Lytton and by Benjamin Disraeli, who was then flirting with radicalism. Fonblanque remained at the Examiner despite many offers of other literary employment, resolving to make it a standard of literary excellence in journalism.

Fonblanque entirely took over The Examiner in 1830, serving as editor until 1847. Among the contributors he found were John Stuart Mill, John Forster, William Makepeace Thackeray, and most notably Charles Dickens. Fonblanque wrote the first notice of Sketches by Boz (on 28 February 1836) and of The Pickwick Papers (on 4 September 1836). Forster became the magazine's literary editor in 1835, and succeeded Fonblanque as editor from 1847 to 1855. Fonblanque retained ownership until 1865. The magazine ceased publication in 1886.

=== Board of Trade ===
Fonblanque was offered the governorship of Nova Scotia; but though greatly interested in colonial matters and using every effort to advocate a more generous political system leading to colonial self-government, he again decided not to abandon his beloved Examiner. In 1847, however, domestic reasons induced him to accept the post of statistical secretary of the Board of Trade. This compelled him to resign from The Examiner, although he continued to contribute to it under the control of John Forster. During the later years of his life Fonblanque took no prominent part in public affairs. He died aged 79. By then he was, as his nephew Edward Fonblanque observed, a man who had lived and toiled in an age gone by, in a cause long since established.

Albany Fonblanque's political activity may be judged from his England under Seven Administrations (1837), which compares the course of social and political events in England from 1826 to 1837. As a journalist, he must be regarded in the light of a reformer.

== Changing attitudes to journalists ==
Journalism before Fonblanque's day was seen as a somewhat discreditable profession: men of culture were shy of entering it, lest they be confused with the ruder combatants fighting for public notice. Fonblanque, with his strong and earnest political convictions and exceptional literary ability, did not hesitate to choose the field as one where a politician and a man of letters might usefully and honourably put forth his gifts. A good account of him appears in the Life and Labours of Albany Fonblanque, edited by his nephew, Edward Barrington de Fonblanque (London, 1874). It includes a collection of his articles with a brief biographical notice.
