= John Anthony Fonblanque =

English politician and barrister

John Anthony Fonblanque KC (12 June 1759 – 4 January 1837) was an English politician and barrister.

== Early life and name ==
Born John Anthony Fonblanque, he was the son of Jean de Grenier de Fonblanque, a banker, naturalised as Jean Fonblanque,

He was educated at Harrow School and Oxford. In 1828, late in life, he changed his surname by royal licence to de Grenier Fonblanque. He was descended from a Huguenot family, his father having exchanged the surname de Grenier de Fonblanque for that of Fonblanque on his naturalisation in England.

== Career ==
He was commissioned as an ensign in the Berkshire Militia in 1780. The regiment was disembodied in March 1783.

Called to the bar at the Middle Temple, 24 January 1783, Fonblanque distinguished himself in 1791 as leading counsel at the bar of the House of Commons on behalf of the merchants of London in opposition to the Quebec bill.

Fonblanque was the author of the very extensive notes forming the useful body of the standard legal work, Treatise on Equity nominally ascribed to Henry Ballow. This revised edition was first published in 1793–1794; the fifth London edition appeared in 1820.

He was Member of Parliament (MP) for the borough of Camelford 1802–1806 as a member of the Whig party following members of his wife's family, Samuel Martin and Sir Ralph Payne. Financial troubles brought an end to his political career by 1810.

He was one of the Whig "friends" of King George IV when Prince of Wales and is also said to have been a personal friend of his Royal Highness. He is supposed to have written the celebrated letters to the King on the subject of his Royal Highness's exclusion from the army which were generally attributed to Lord Moira.

Made King's Counsel on 28 April 1804, his brilliant early reputation meant he was spoken of as a future Whig Lord Chancellor. Vanity led Fonblanque into debt in 1807–08, and money problems, his wife left him in 1834, remained with him and his family the rest of his life. In later years he withdrew a great deal from the profession. It was said that Lord Eldon hearing that his library was to be sold purchased it and presented it to him.

== Family ==
John Anthony Fonblanque died on 4 January 1837 in his 77th year, still confined to the area just outside the debtors' prison, retaining his faculties to the last and "with perfect resignation".

On 30 May 1786, he married Frances Caroline Fitzgerald (1760–1844), sister of the poet William Thomas Fitzgerald and daughter of Colonel John Austen Fitzgerald and Henrietta Martin sister of Samuel Martin, and with her he was father of:

- John Samuel Martin Fonblanque (March 1787 – 2 November 1865).
- Thomas Fonblanque (26 January 1793 – 1861), Her Britannic Majesty's Consul General and Chargé d'Affaires in Serbia and father of historian Edward Barrington de Fonblanque of the War Office.
- Albany Fonblanque (1 October 1794 – 13 October 1872).
- Three daughters : Caroline, Harriott and Eliza.

== Publications ==
- A serious exhortation to the Electors of Great Britain House of Commons, 1791
- Thoughts on the Canada Bill, Now Depending in Parliament 1791
- A Treatise on Equity, with the addition of marginal references and notes in two volumes, 1792 (5th edition J & W T Clarke, 1820)
- The case of Samuel Howe Showers Esq., Lieutenant Colonel in the military service of the East India Company at Calcutta to which is subjoined the opinions of Mr. Erskine and Mr. Fonblanque thereon 1796
- Doubts as to the expediency of adopting the recommendation of the bullion committee 1810
- The revised opinion of John Fonblanque on the case of the Baron de Bode 1834 (a dispute concerning compensation for lands seized in France during the revolution)

== Notes ==
Parliament of the United Kingdom
Preceded by William Joseph Denison; John Angerstein	Member of Parliament for Camelford; 1802–1812; With: Robert Adair	Succeeded by Robert Adair; The Viscount Maitland
