= John Samuel Martin Fonblanque =

John Samuel Martin Fonblanque (March 1787 – 3 November 1865) was an English legal writer and Commissioner of Bankruptcy.

== Biography ==
=== Early life ===
The eldest son of barrister John Anthony Fonblanque, K.C. and MP, born in Brook Street, London in March 1787, Fonblanque was educated privately at Putney under Mr Applebee. He spent nine months at Charterhouse under Dr Raine, and received private tuition at Epsom for two years under Mr Boucher. He was admitted as "pensioner" at Gonville and Caius College, Cambridge, aged 17, on 28 August 1804. He was on the list of scholars from Michaelmas 1804 to Lady Day 1809, and was third in the classical and mathematical examinations, 1805.

Fonblanque was one of the founders of the Cambridge Union Society.

=== War service ===
In 1810 Fonblanque left Cambridge due to ill-health, a burst blood-vessel on the lungs, and entered the Army obtaining a commission in the 21st Fusiliers. With this regiment he served at Cadiz, Gibraltar, in Sicily and the Greek Islands then in Italy. Lord William Bentinck, under whom he served in Italy, appointed him deputy judge advocate-general. In the American War (of 1812) he was present at the taking of Washington, at the Battle of Baltimore, and ultimately at the fatal repulse at New Orleans when he was made prisoner within the enemy's lines being one of the very few who had succeeded in crossing the works. His last service was with the army of occupation in France in 1815. He left Valenciennes in November 1816 and was almost immediately called to the bar.

=== The law and its reform ===
Fonblanque was called to the bar at Lincoln's Inn, London, 26 November 1816 having kept the necessary terms at Lincoln's Inn during his residence at Cambridge. The next year Lord Eldon appointed him one of the then seventy commissioners of bankruptcy. The abuses and imperfections of the bankruptcy system did not escape his attention and long before law reform became fashionable he published a pamphlet on the subject. Having attracted the notice of Lord Brougham as a law reformer Fonblanque was appointed one of the original Commissioners of the newly instituted Court of Bankruptcy.

=== Legal writer ===
With John Paris he wrote Medical Jurisprudence published in 1823. It was awarded the first Swiney Prize for works on jurisprudence; and it remained the only guide on the subject for many years.

He was one of the founders of The Jurist in 1826. A quarterly journal of jurisprudence and legislation The Jurist was the first periodical which systematically advocated the amendment of the law. This was considered a bold step.

Fonblanque married Caroline O'Connell, daughter of John O'Connell of Cork. They had at least two sons and a daughter. He died at Brighton on 3 November 1865.

== Publications ==
- Treatise on Medical Jurisprudence with Dr John Ayrton Paris, 1823
- Observations on a bill now before Parliament, 1824
- Contributions to the quarterly journal The Jurist 1826-
