= Hamilton Love =

American sports journalist (1875–1922)

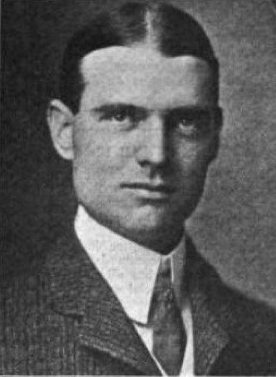
- Born: Henry Hamilton Love; December 27, 1875; Nashville, Tennessee, U.S.
- Died: May 2, 1922 (aged 46); Nashville, Tennessee, U.S.
- Resting place: Mount Olivet Cemetery; Nashville, Tennessee, U.S.
- Occupations: Lumberman, newswriter
- Known for: Author of "The Hardwood Code"
- Spouse: Bessie May Davis
- Children: Henry Hamilton Love, Jr. Robert Hamilton Love

Henry Hamilton Love (December 27, 1875 – May 2, 1922) was a lumberman, sportswriter and humorist who lived in Nashville, Tennessee. He was known as the "Daddy of the Nashville lumberman" and was the first president of the Nashville Lumberman's Club. Love wrote the Hardwood Code, a telegraphic code once used extensively in the lumber trade and that was urged by the Hardwood Manufacturer's Association of the United States.

Love contributed articles covering the American South to The Sporting News and Sporting Life. He was chairman of the local baseball committee and wrote several articles covering the Nashville Vols. He was also chair of the Nashville board of censorship of moving pictures and was active in the Rotary Club.

== Early years and ancestry ==
Hamilton Love was born on December 27, 1875, on his father's farm about three miles (4.8 km) from Nashville, Tennessee; he was the youngest child of James Benton Love and Mary Elizabeth Plummer, and was named for his grandfather. Love's father James was a coal merchant and a member of the firm Love & Randle.

Love's maternal grandfather James Ransom Plummer was the mayor of Columbia, Tennessee, in 1832, 1833, 1834, 1836, and 1838. Love was thus a descendant of Regulator James Ransom, and a relative of North Carolina statesman Nathaniel Macon, Confederate generals Matt Whitaker Ransom and Robert Ransom, and University of North Carolina president Kemp Plummer Battle.

One of Love's paternal great-grandmothers was a Gannaway, making him also a relative of Tennessee governor William Gannaway Brownlow and Duke University professor William Trigg Gannaway.

== Career and public life ==
=== News reporter ===
Love left school at the age of fifteen and worked as a reporter and newswriter for the Nashville Evening Herald. He then got a job writing for the Sunday Times, and later for the Nashville American.

Love contributed articles covering the American South to The Sporting News and Sporting Life. Love was chairman of the local baseball committee and wrote several articles covering the Nashville Vols.

In 1908, when the Nashville Vols team won the Southern pennant after defeating New Orleans, Love wrote:

"By one run, by one point, Nashville has won the Southern League pennant, nosing New Orleans out literally by an eyelash. Saturday's game, which was the deciding one, between Nashville and New Orleans was the greatest exhibition of the national game ever seen in the south and the finish in the league race probably sets a record in baseball history.

=== Lumber business ===
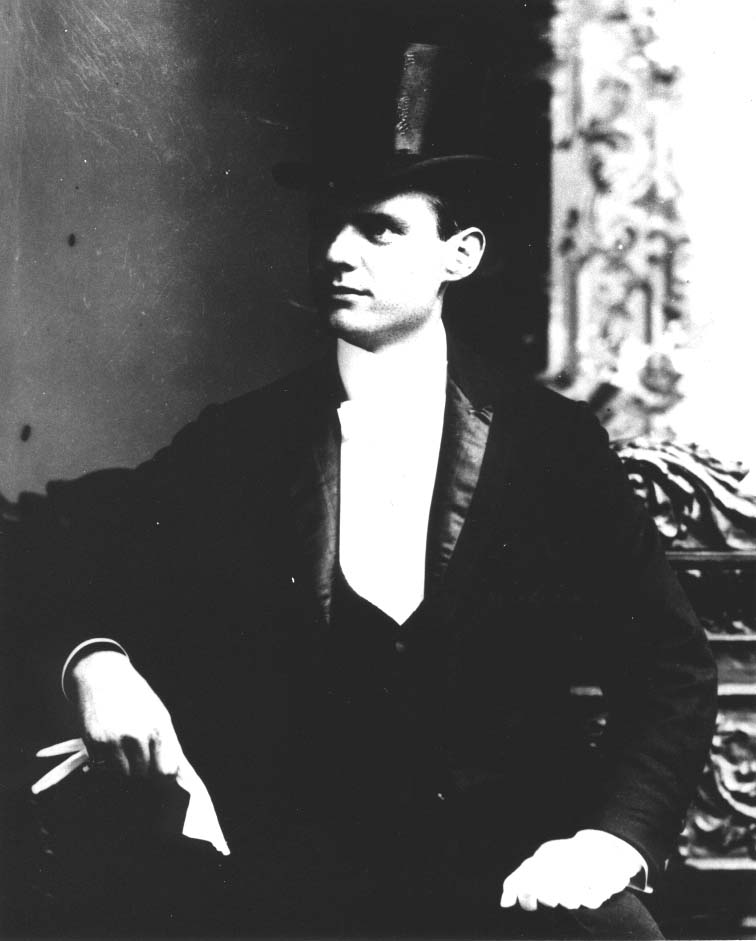
Love in top hat and tails c. 1898.

Love was recognized as the "Daddy of the Nashville lumbermen". He worked for his brother John Wheatley Love's firm Love, Boyd, & Co, which avoided losing and in fact made money during the Panic of 1893. From 1895 or 1896, Hamilton Love initially worked in a minor capacity but was given every opportunity for advancement and learned the trade. By 1899, he assumed charge of the firm's Nashville office. (Note: The firm also had an office in Scottsville, Kentucky, where John Boyd lived. Boyd married John and Hamilton's sister Nellie Love. Boyd owned the first car in Scottsville.) In 1900, Love traveled to Europe.

In 1910, urged on by the Hardwood Manufacturer's Association of the United States, he wrote the Hardwood Code, a telegraphic code used extensively in the trade, which became known as the Love code. The same year, he also wrote an article on the timber business for the Nashville American's Anniversary Edition.

In 1915, Love's brother John moved to New York, and Hamilton took over as director of the First and Fourth National Banks. Shortly before Love's death the Nashville business was run by him and his relative Tom Lesueur.

=== Clubs ===
Love was a member of several organizations; his "public spirit" was "one of his most strongly marked characteristics" and he was "always doing something to help Nashville". Love became the first president of the Nashville Lumberman's Club in 1910. He was president until 1913. In 1914 he was still active, appointed to the Lumberman's Club's "Buy-A-Bale-of-Cotton" Committee.

Love was vice-regent of the Concatenated Order of Hoo-Hoo, a fraternal organization for lumbermen. Love signed the Hardwood Code's introduction "B.T.T.O.T.G.B.C.", an acronym for "By the tail of the great black cat". (Note: The club's founders wanted the organization to be unconventional and unregimented. Its single aim was "to foster the health, happiness, and long life of its members". In a spirit of fun, pseudonyms for some of the officers were inspired by Lewis Carroll's poem The Hunting of the Snark. The Hoo-Hoo emblem is a black cat with its tail curled into the shape of the numeral 9.)

Love was an officer and one of the three organizers of the Nashville Commercial Club, which was started as a group of young businessmen known as the Young Turks and was eventually consolidated into the local Board of Trade. Love was editor of the Commercial Club Tattler.

On November 25, 1913, Love was a charter member of the Rotary Club in Nashville. He was president of the club in 1915. In 1916 he invited President Woodrow Wilson to Nashville. He was still active in 1918, supporting the Rotary's ban on membership in other, similar organizations.

=== Film censor board ===
Also in 1914, mayor Hilary Ewing Howse appointed Love chair of his local film censor board, and he was appointed to a national film censor board in 1917.

== Personal life ==
On November 30, 1901, Love married Bessie May Davis, whose father Leonard Fite Davis was a relative of Leonard B. Fite, and thus of the Fite sisters who were married by Vanderbilt football coach Dan McGugin and Michigan football coach Fielding Yost. She was also a descendant of former Confederate president Jefferson Davis. Love and Davis had two sons, Henry Hamilton Love, Jr. and Robert Hamilton Love, both of whom became seamen. "Ham" Jr. attended the Naval Academy and married Louise McAlister, the daughter of governor and Florida businessman Hill McAlister.

== Death ==
On May 2, 1922, Love died of a revolver gunshot wound to the chest, which was ruled a suicide. He was buried in Mount Olivet Cemetery, Nashville. The local Chamber of Commerce, in which Love was also active, adopted a resolution in his memory, which is:

"dear to the citizens of Nashville. His matchless bravery in the face of the passing years that smote his frail body with pain and suffering almost incessantly will always appeal to us as an example of fine, undaunted courage. He went to his Maker with head erect, unconquered by the long-continued and well-nigh intolerable blow of physical agony."

Love had apparently been suffering from rheumatism and one of his feet was severely injured by falling boards in 1919. He still reviewed films from his bed. His poems were read at his funeral.

His widow remarried to Marcel Colin in 1929.
