= James Ransom Plummer =

American politician (1797–1858)

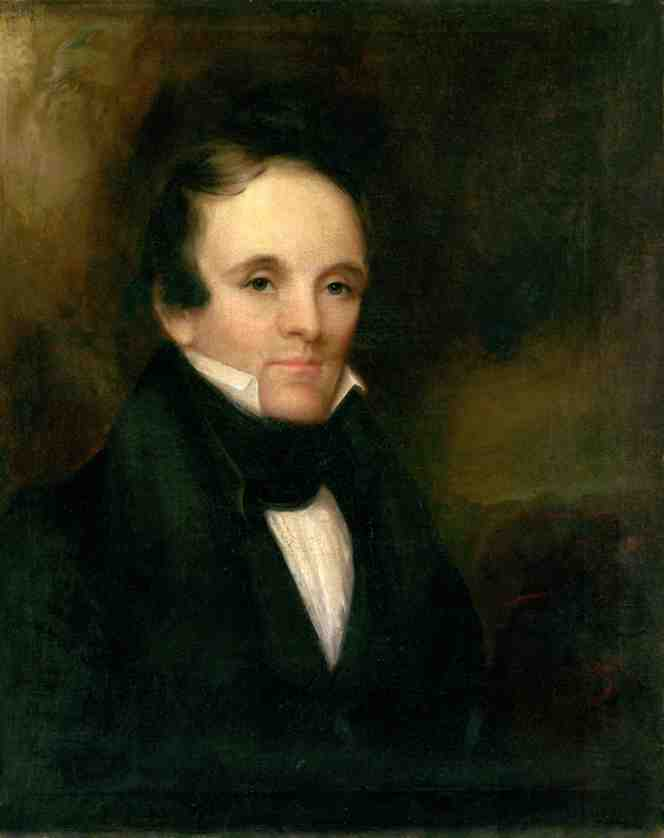
- Painting by Washington Bogart Cooper
- Born: March 9, 1797; Warren County, North Carolina, US
- Died: February 24, 1858 (aged 60); Nashville, Tennessee, US
- Occupation: Mayor of Columbia, Tennessee
- Known for: Methodist activism
- Spouse(s): Elizabeth Longley; Elizabeth Ganaway Love
- Children: 16

James Ransom Plummer (March 9, 1797 – February 24, 1858) was the mayor of Columbia, Tennessee, in 1832, 1833, 1834, 1836, and 1838. He was an active Methodist. He was also in Nashville, one of the presiding elders of Davidson County in 1844.

== Early life and relatives ==
James Ransom Plummer was born on March 9, 1797, in Warren County, North Carolina to William Plummer and Elizabeth Jones Ransom. He was therefore a nephew of North Carolina statesman Nathaniel Macon and also a nephew of Macon's wife Hannah Plummer. William and Hannah's brother was the lawyer Kemp Plummer, the grandfather of future University of North Carolina president Kemp Plummer Battle.

J. R. Plummer's grandfather was Macon's stepfather and Regulator James Ransom. Plummer is a relative of Confederate generals Matt Whitaker Ransom and Robert Ransom.

=== Children ===
He sired 16 children between two wives, Elizabeth Eleanor Longley (died in 1845) and Elizabeth Gannaway Love. Longley was born in Abingdon, Virginia. Future Nashville lumberman Hamilton Love was his grandson.

His first two sons William and James were Methodist ministers - and his first daughter married a Methodist minister. His sons Rufus and Henry served in the Mexican War, Rufus being a casualty of the war. Henry then tried his hand at the California Gold Rush. His sons Carvossa, Philip, and George served for the Confederacy. Carvossa was wounded at the Battle of Fort Donelson. George rode with Forrest. A son by his second wife, Albert Love Plummer, was a professor of Greek.

== Death ==
He died of consumption on February 24, 1858. Plummer is buried in Nashville City Cemetery, near his countryman in Columbia Felix Zollicoffer.
