= Senator Plummer =

Senator Plummer may refer to:

- Gary Plummer (politician) (fl. 1970s–2010s), Maine State Senate
- George Plummer (1785–1872), Connecticut State Senate
- Jason Plummer (politician) (born 1982), Illinois State Senate
- Kemp Plummer (1769–1826), North Carolina State Senate
- Larry Plummer (1940–2004), Florida State Senate
- W. H. Plummer (1860–1926), Washington State Senate

== See also ==
- William Plumer (1759–1850), U.S. Senator from New Hampshire
- William Plumer Jr. (1789–1854), New Hampshire State Senate
