= Senator Rockwell =

Senator Rockwell may refer to:

- Francis W. Rockwell (politician) (1844–1929), Massachusetts State Senate
- Irvin E. Rockwell (1862–1952), Idaho State Senate
- Julius Rockwell (1805–1888), Massachusetts State Senate
- Robert F. Rockwell (1886–1950), Colorado State Senate
- Samuel Rockwell (1803–1880), Connecticut State Senate
- William W. Rockwell (1824–1894), New York State Senate
