= Prepared Meals Tax in North Carolina =

Prepared Meals Tax in North Carolina is a 1% tax that is imposed upon meals that are prepared at restaurants. The tax is only imposed by local jurisdictions upon the granting of approval by the North Carolina General Assembly. The provision is found in G.S. 105-164.3(28) and reads as follows:

- 28) Prepared food. – Food that meets at least one of the conditions of this subdivision. Prepared food does not include food the retailer sliced, repackaged, or pasteurized but did not heat, mix, or sell with eating utensils.
  - a. It is sold in a heated state or it is heated by the retailer.
  - b. It consists of two or more foods mixed or combined by the retailer for sale as a single item.

This subdivision does not include foods containing raw eggs, fish, meat, or poultry that require cooking by the consumer as recommended by the Food and Drug Administration to prevent food borne illnesses.

  - c. It is sold with eating utensils provided by the retailer, such as plates, knives, forks, spoons, glasses, cups, napkins, and straws.

Currently this legislation is only approved for use by fourteen local jurisdictions throughout North Carolina.

== Legislative approval ==
The prepared food tax proceeds are restricted by county and local jurisdictions. A portion of the revenue that is generated is earmarked for tourism or programs designed to increase visitor services.

== Enacted jurisdictions ==
Charlotte and Mecklenburg County are proposing a 1% increase to the already existing 1% tax on food and beverage sold within the county. The request is being made in an effort to fund a renovation project for the Carolina Panthers, the National Football League team located within the city limits. This one percent increase will equate to approximately 23 million dollars in additional revenue for the city. This proposal has not been decided on by the General Assembly.

== Prospective funds ==
The Meals Tax Predictor projected positive revenues for 71 counties and negative revenues for eight counties.

The projected Meals Tax revenue was divided into the amount the county would generate by increasing its property tax by one cent. This produced the one cent Meals Tax equivalent for property tax. Fifty-one of the seventy-one counties' Meals Tax equivalents generated more than one cent of property tax. For 20 counties, the Meals Tax equivalent generated less than one cent on the property tax. Therefore, for a majority of North Carolina counties, implementing a one cent Meals Tax could produce more revenue than a one cent property tax increase.

== Restrictions governing use ==
The use of the Prepared Food Tax must be specifically earmarked by the jurisdiction for use on tourism or cultural projects. The implementation of this tax would benefit the vast majority of counties and municipalities within North Carolina, but only if they are able to show a need for funds in accordance with the restrictions of the tax.

== The effects felt ==
The financial data of revenue, collected by the State Treasurer's Office, on each respective county provides for an insight into the expected funds that could be generated by implementing such a tax. This tax would affect everyone when "eating out" within each county, but may prove more beneficial to the resident as well as the jurisdiction. The jurisdictions within the state that implement this tax can show a high level of tourism, which will generate a larger number of food sales. The residents within the jurisdiction will also find themselves subject to this tax, but if it were implemented in lieu of a property tax increase it may prove more fiscally prudent for the individual taxpayer. The amount of tax each household pays when eating out, may be far less than an increase in property taxes. The household can also control the amount of tax they pay by not eating out, opposed to a hike in a required property tax.
