= List of mayors of Columbia, Tennessee =

City of Columbia, Tennessee mayors

The following is a list of mayors of the city of Columbia, Tennessee, United States of America.

- Meredith Helm, 1829–1830, 1834–1836, 1841–1843, 1848-1853
- James Walker, 1830-1832
- J.R. Plummer, 1832–1834, 1836–1837, 1838-1839
- John Kirk, 1837-1838
- Archibald H. Buchanan, 1839-1840
- Terry Cahal, 1840-1841
- S.A. Hamner, 1843–1844, 1845-1847
- Lee Holman, 1844–1845, 1847-1848
- W.J. Dale, 1853–1854, 1869-1870
- W.B. Wilson, 1854-1855
- Thomas Keesee, 1855-1857
- Edward Kuhn, 1857–1858, 1866–1867, 1872-1874
- J.R. Lamb, 1858-1859
- W.R. Hodge, 1859-1860
- J.P. McGaw, 1860–1862, 1871-1872
- J.S. Negley, 1862-1864
- W.J. Andrews, 1864–1865, 1881–1884, 1885-1886
- Joseph A. Walker, 1865-1866
- J.A. Engle, 1867-1869
- J.T.L. Cochran, 1870-1871
- T.W. Keesee, 1874-1875
- J.P. Brown, 1875-1876
- John Latta Jr., 1876-1877
- J.T. Williamson, 1877-1878
- J.M. Hodge, 1878-1879
- L.W. Black, 1879-1881
- J.E.R. Carpenter, 1884
- J.G. Bailey, 1884-1885
- Joseph Towler, 1886-1888
- Robert Pillow, 1888-1890
- H.L. Hendley, 1890-1893
- J.A. Smiser, 1893
- T.E. Lipscomb, 1894-1896
- A.J. Nichols, 1896-1898
- E. Yoest, 1898–1900, 1902-1903
- W.D. Cameron, 1900-1902
- J.A. Titcomb, 1903-1904
- J.F. Brownlow, 1904-1906
- R.H. Guest, 1906-1908
- W.M. Biddle, 1908-1912
- J.M. Dedman, 1912-1920
- W.O. Cherry, 1920-1922
- Fred Latta, 1922-1928
- H.W. Frierson, 1928-1930
- F.D. Chaffin, 1930-1936
- Eldridge Dedham, 1936–1940, 1943-1954
- George Sloan, 1940-1943
- Thomas F. Williams, 1954-1958
- Thomas McGrew, 1958-1962
- Harry Napier, 1962-1966
- James Dowdy, 1966-1970
- J.J. Underwood, 1970-1974
- J.A. (Buddy) Morgan, 1974-1982
- James L. Bailey, 1982-1986
- J.A. Morgan, 1986-1990
- Barbara McIntyre, 1990–1998, 1999-2006
- Larry Smithson, 1998-1999
- William E. Gentner, 2006-2010
- Dean Dickey, 2010-2018
- Chaz Molder, c.2018-present

== See also ==
- Columbia history
