= James Ransom (Regulator) =

American sheriff (1740–1810)

- Born: c. 1740; Brunswick County, Virginia
- Died: 1810; Warren County, North Carolina
- Relatives: Nathaniel Macon's stepfather

James Ransom (c. 1740–1810) was an American sheriff and participant in the Regulator movement in colonial America.

Ransom was a delegate to the second North Carolina Provincial Congress from Bute County, North Carolina (now Warren County) in 1775, as well as a member of the Bute County Committee of Safety alongside Jethro Sumner. He was the step-father of Nathaniel Macon and a neighbor of Benjamin Hawkins. He married Macon's mother Priscilla Jones after the death of Gideon Macon.

== Early life ==
James Ransom was born about 1740 in Brunswick County, Virginia to Richard Ransom and Frances Hicks. Despite his father not being named James, he was often referred to as "James Ransom, Jr", to distinguish him from his cousin James Ransom who married Amy Davis. He married Priscilla Macon in Oxford, North Carolina on February 9, 1763.

== American Revolution ==
Ransom was a "man of energetic Regulator sympathies". "Men like him had begun to call themselves patriots and Sons of Liberty, while labeling their loyalist neighbors Tories, oppressors, and damned rascals". He succeeded Osborn Jefferys as sheriff of Bute County in 1771, and was succeeded in that capacity in 1772 by Jethro Sumner. Ransom was a Justice of the Peace and both Ransom and Sumner were members of the Bute County Committee of Safety. Ransom was a delegate to the Second North Carolina Provincial Congress at New Bern in April 1775.

During the American Revolution in 1776, Ransom was appointed superintendent of the North Carolina Gun Works in Halifax, North Carolina.

== Ancestors and relatives ==
Ransom's great-great grandfather was Peter Ransom, who arrived in Virginia from England, settling in Elizabeth County, Virginia, and served in the House of Burgesses in 1652.

Ransom was the great-grandfather of Confederate generals Matt Whitaker Ransom and Robert Ransom, and great-great grandfather of Confederate general John Pegram and artillerist William Ransom Johnson Pegram.

Robert Ransom described his great grandfather: "The stories of his costumes and habits all indicate that he possessed a large fortune. He was a man nearly six feet tall with a ruddy complexion. He became very stout in his old age...He divided his large fortune equally among his step children and his own children. He was doubtless a high liver and he was a real English churchman, but with no great piety. He built the first Episcopal church in Bute Co., known as Shocco Chapel."

Marmaduke Johnson, who married Ransom's daughter Hixie Ransom, was the owner of the oldest house in Warrenton. Another daughter, Betsy Ransom, married William Plummer II. Their son James Ransom Plummer was the mayor of Columbia, Tennessee in 1832, 1833, 1834, 1836, and 1838. William's brother Kemp Plummer, the grandfather of Kemp Plummer Battle, was the second owner of Johnson's house. William and Kemp's sister Hannah was the wife of Nathaniel Macon.
