= John Haywood (politician) =

American politician

Honorable John Haywood
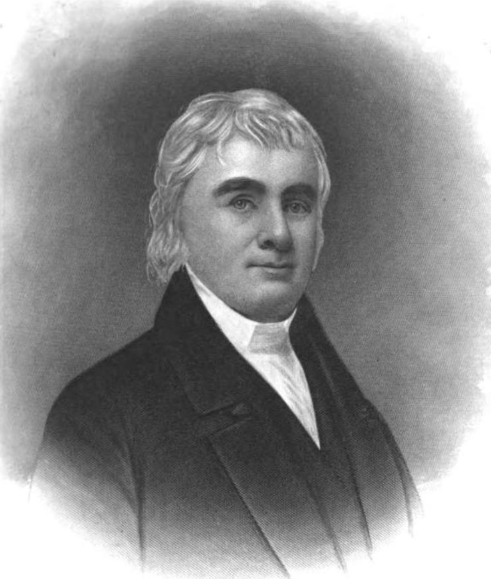

2nd North Carolina State Treasurer
- In office 1787–1827
- Preceded by: Memucan Hunt
- Succeeded by: William S. Robards

Personal details
- Born: February 23, 1755 Edgecombe County, Province of North Carolina
- Died: November 18, 1827 (aged 72) Raleigh, Wake County, North Carolina, USA
- Spouse(s): Sarah Leigh (d. 1791); Eliza Williams
- Children: 1 son with Sarah; 12 children with Eliza
- Occupation: North Carolina Senate clerk, North Carolina State Treasurer

John Haywood (born Edgecombe County, North Carolina, February 23, 1755; died Raleigh, Wake County, North Carolina, November 18, 1827) was an American politician, who was the longest-serving North Carolina State Treasurer from 1787 until his death in 1827.

== Early and family life ==
Haywood's father was North Carolina politician, judge and patriot William Haywood (1730–79), who had married Charity Hare (of Hertford County, North Carolina), who bore nine children, including banker Sherwood Haywood. This John Haywood was named for his grandfather, another John Haywood (1685-), who was born in Barbados, arrived in North Carolina about 1730 and became active in local politics.

For many years this John Haywood and his first wife, Sarah Leigh, used their new premises to entertain official state dignitaries. Sarah gave John one son, named Leigh.

After Sarah died in 1791, John remarried, on March 9, 1798, Eliza Eagles Asaph Williams, by whom he had 12 children, including sons William Haywood, John S. Haywood, Ernest Haywood, Dr. Edmund Burke Haywood, and Dr. Fabius Haywood.

== Career ==
Haywood began public service in 1781 as clerk of the State Senate, and held this office for five years, after which the state legislature elected him the state Treasurer, a position he would hold forty years, until his death. Haywood also became the first Intendant of Police, or Mayor of Raleigh, North Carolina, in 1795.

== Financial scandal ==
In 1820 "Treasurer John," one of the most popular men in the state, was accused of "abusing his trust." The legislature promptly exonerated him following an inquiry, but an examination of the records after his death in 1827 disclosed that public funds in excess of $68,000 were, in fact, unaccounted for. That was a massive shortfall in those days – more than half the state's entire budget for the year. Haywood's heirs reimbursed the state nearly $48,000 for the missing money, but examiners shortly afterward discovered an additional shortage of almost $22,000 in Cherokee bonds, revenue from the sale of public lands in western North Carolina.

The historian William K. Boyd commented that the accounting of public funds in those days was deficient in three respects: "First, the comptroller did not have oversight of the actual money in the treasury; the auditing by the comptroller did not include all state funds; and the method of bonding the treasurer was not adequate." In 1784 a law had been enacted requiring the Treasurer to post a bond in the amount of "one hundred thousand pounds," but an 1801 statute reduced the amount of the required bond to a sum equal to the balance of existing treasury funds, plus estimated annual revenue for the following year. It stipulated moreover that no penalty would be imposed for failure to comply with the requirement.

Although banks were operating in Raleigh and throughout North Carolina, Haywood preferred to keep the state's money in a "Public Chest" in his office, dipping into it as necessary to pay governmental and perhaps personal expenses. Since he had posted no bond from 1826 to 1827, when the shortfall was discovered in his accounts, state officials had no practical means of recovering the missing money.

They took Haywood's estate to court, but to no avail. The court held that the executor had properly dispersed all but slightly more than $7,000 of Haywood's assets. This meager sum was duly awarded to the state, minus a small amount for his widow's dower rights.

== Death and legacy ==
When Haywood died in Raleigh in 1827, "a great procession was given in his honor and his funeral was conducted in the Presbyterian Church by Reverend Doctor McPheeters". The legislature elected his son, John S. Haywood, to succeed him as treasurer, but the son declined the office, as the magnitude of his father's malfeasance was becoming clear. From 1797 to 1809, Haywood owned Locust Grove plantation at Ingleside, North Carolina. It was listed on the National Register of Historic Places in 1975.

When a law was passed requiring state officials to live in Raleigh, Haywood bought land bounded by New Bern, Blount, Edenton and Person Streets, and built Haywood Hall. Although it was sold to pay his debts because of the scandal noted above, it survives today. It was listed on the National Register of Historic Places in 1970, and remains a popular venue for small groups.

Haywood County was named in his honor during his lifetime (it was created in 1808), and he also subsequently had a town named after him in Chatham County.

Political offices
| Preceded by Memucan Hunt | Treasurer of North Carolina; 1787–1827 | Succeeded by William S. Robards |
