= John M. Worth =

American politician

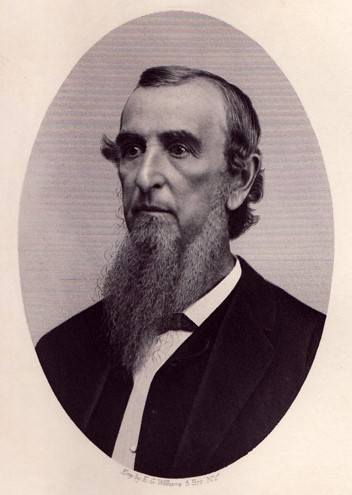

Treasurer of North Carolina
- In office 1876–1885
- Preceded by: David A. Jenkins
- Succeeded by: Donald W. Bain

John Milton Worth (c. 1810–1900) served as North Carolina State Treasurer from 1876 to 1885. He was the younger brother of Jonathan Worth, who served as the state's Treasurer and Governor during the 1860s.

John Worth served several terms in the North Carolina Senate, representing Moore and Montgomery Counties in the 1840s. Like his older brother, he was a Unionist or Anti-Secessionist until the Civil War broke out, when he became loyal to the Southern cause, serving as an officer in the Confederate military reserves.

In 1870, Worth was elected state Senator from Randolph County. In November 1876, he was elected by the people to a four-year term as State Treasurer. His name added strength to the ticket and is credited with helping his fellow Democrats regain power in the state. When incumbent Republican David A. Jenkins resigned before the end of his term, Governor Curtis H. Brogden named Worth to fill the post a few months early. As Treasurer, he faced the difficult task of settling the state's debt on a fair and equitable basis to both the bond holders and the citizens.

Worth was re-elected Treasurer in 1880, serving just over four more years. He was highly respected by contemporaries for his service. He once commented upon his guiding philosophy: "My earnest wish has been to be useful to the State."

After leaving public service, Worth became president of the Bank of Randolph and of the Southern Stock Mutual Fire Insurance Company. His Worth Manufacturing Company operated successful cotton mills in Worthville and Central Falls in Randolph County, not far from where the North Carolina Zoological Park is located today. By the time of his death in 1900 at age 90, he had become one of the state's wealthiest citizens.

Party political offices
Preceded by John W. Graham	Democratic nominee for North Carolina State Treasurer; 1876, 1880	Succeeded by Donald W. Bain
Political offices
Preceded by David A. Jenkins	Treasurer of North Carolina; 1876–1885	Succeeded by Donald W. Bain
