= Edward Moseley =

British colonial official

The Honourable Edward Moseley
- Born: c. 16 February 1683; St. Giles, Cripplegate, London, England
- Died: July 11, 1749 (aged 65–66); North Carolina
- Education: Christ's Hospital
- Spouse(s): Ann Walker; Ann Sampson

Edward Moseley (c. 1683 – 11 July 1749), was a British colonial official who served as the first public treasurer of North Carolina from 1715 until his death in July 1749. He previously served as the surveyor-general of North Carolina before 1710 and again from 1723 to 1733. Moseley was also responsible, with William Byrd of Virginia, for surveying the boundary between North Carolina and Virginia in 1728.

Moseley also served as speaker of the North Carolina House of Burgesses (the lower house of the provincial legislature) for several terms, as he was consistently re-elected by his party. He briefly acted as governor while Governor Burrington was out of the province.

== Early life and education ==
Coat of Arms of Edward Moseley

John Moseley married Mary Beaman at All Hallows London Wall on 5 February 1681/2. Their son Edward was born 16 February 1682/3 just prior to his father's release from indenture. John Moseley began his own merchant tailor business in Cripplegate, just west of Bishopsgate; but he had died by April 1690 when his orphaned son applied to Christ's Hospital. School records confirm that Moseley was a pupil at Christ's Hospital, Newgate, in a division called the Royal Mathematical School which had been founded in 1673 to supply educated navigators to the navy and merchant marine. Moseley applied to the school at the age of 7 or 8 and was accepted the following year on 2 July 1691. There, he studied the trade of a navigator for more than six years.

Discharge records show that Moseley left Christ's Hospital 24 December 1697, aged 14/15, to serve an apprenticeship which was to last until December 1703, with Captain Jacob Foreland on the ship Joseph, trading in the port of Bilbao (a Spanish iron market). Curiously and somewhat irregularly, a handwritten postscript to the indenture with Foreland states "friends of the said boy would not suffer him to be bound to the said captain and have otherwise provided for him." Unknown wealthy friends of Moseley purchased his indenture so that he would not have to go to Spain with Foreland. Soon thereafter, Moseley landed in Charleston, Carolina.

Moseley served southern Carolina as an Ordinary Court clerk (January 1701-02) directly under Governor James Moore. Moseley ceased his role when Nathaniel Johnson succeeded Moore. A possible friend of Moseley's, John Barnhill (later known as "Tuscarora Jack"), replaced him at that time. Afterward, Moseley worked under Dr. Thomas Bray as a librarian for the Society for the Propagation of the Gospel in Foreign Parts in 1703. While in Charleston, Moseley demonstrated a fondness for books and administration and, as a good Anglican, collected religious texts that he later donated to the Anglican Church in Chowan County. Moseley received £5 15s for cataloging the first library in Carolina. This work he performed for Dr. Bray and the Society in May 1703, following the books’ arrival in Charleston.

Through Dr. Bray's acquaintance, he met northern Carolina's, or Albemarle County's, governor Henderson Walker and his wife Ann. Gov. Walker seemed greatly interested in obtaining a similar Christian library for Albemarle’s capital of "Queen Anne’s Town," later Edenton. In October 1703, Walker wrote to the Bishop of London, Thomas Tenison, requesting a gift similar to the Rev. Bray's.

In April 1704, Governor Walker died. Moseley moved to the Albemarle Sound region and married Mrs. Walker in 1705. Moseley, then about 23 years old, began his career as a surveyor and lawyer.

== Career ==
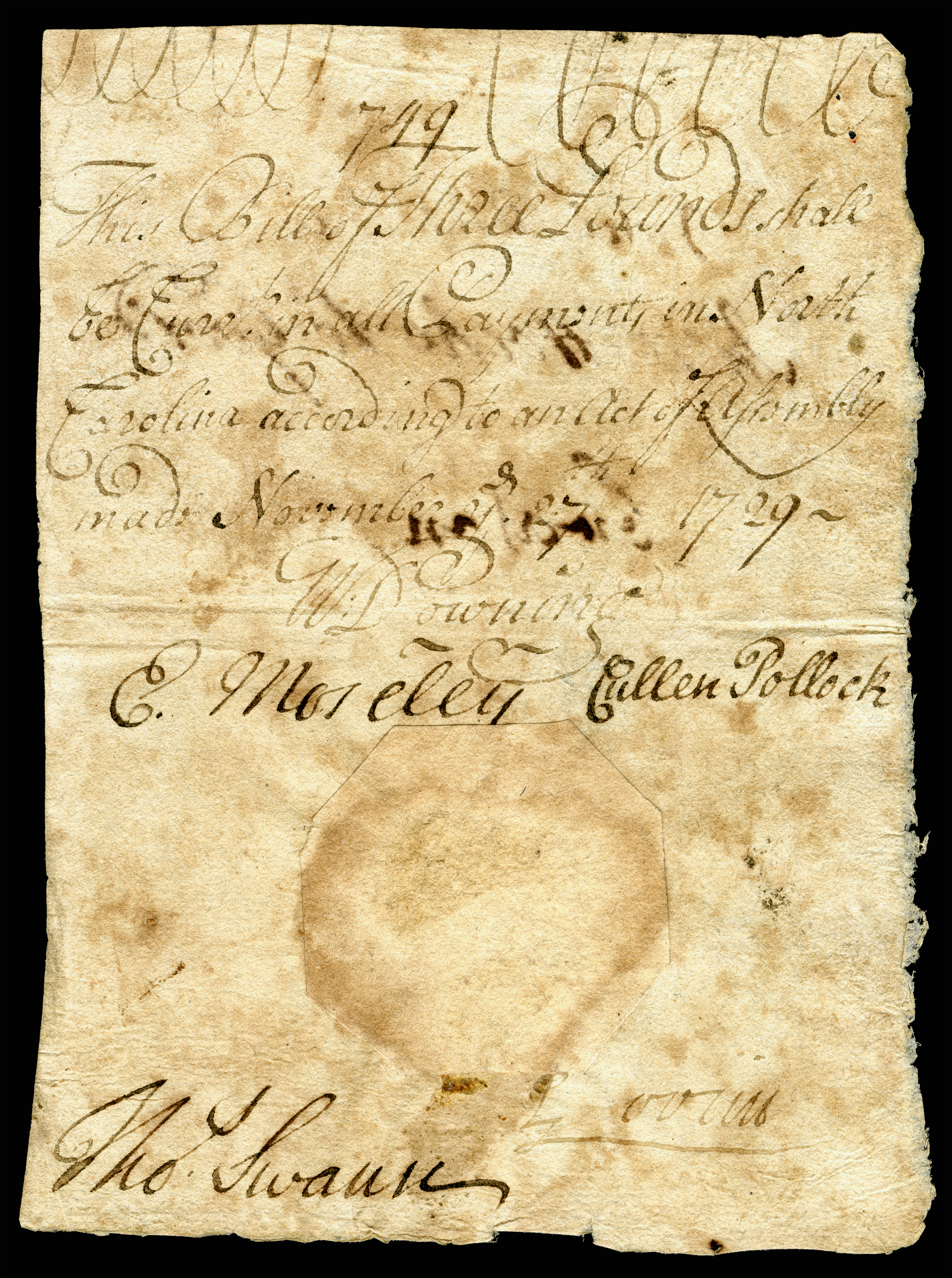
North Carolina Colonial currency (1729) signed by Moseley.

Moseley became a planter, lawyer, surveyor, and politician, with extensive land holdings (at least 55,000 acres) and numerous slaves for the labor of cultivating tobacco, pine trees, rice, and other crops. Known for his generosity to community and church, Moseley may be best remembered for his detailed map of the North Carolina colony, which he published in 1733. A revised version was drawn by the original engraver, John Cowley of London, in 1737. Both were lasting contributions to the settlement of the colony. East Carolina University's Special Collections house perhaps the original copy of the map of 1733, owned by Moseley himself in Greenville, and it held quite a history of its own. An earlier map of the Albemarle (1708) made by Moseley was recently discovered by Dr. Larry Tise of East Carolina University in a publication of treasures from the Lambeth Palace Collection of the Society for the Propagation of the Gospel.

Even though an Anglican, Moseley supported the rights of Dissenters, including Quakers, during Cary's Rebellion, albeit for pecuniary reasons. He also supported the growth of the Anglican Church.

Moseley was a personally motivated, opportunistic man who suffered the vagaries of rival surveyors and colonial justice. He evidently used his authority as surveyor unwisely and was twice accused of not having set foot on the properties that he had supposedly surveyed. Virginia authorities, hungry for a favorable boundary between Virginia and North Carolina, ignored Moseley's more accurate determination of that line, described in the Carolina Charter. By 1711, he was removed as the colony's surveyor and fined £500, having to return all the surveying fees that he had collected near the border.

Later, Moseley was banned from holding public office for several years because he tried to obtain evidence to link Colonial Governor Charles Eden to the pirate Edward Teach known as Blackbeard. Moseley and his brother-in-law Maurice Moore had forcibly entered the office of the colonial secretary in 1718 in search of incriminating evidence and had been surrounded by the governor's agents. Angry words were exchanged. When Moseley's case came to trial the following year, he was accused of uttering "seditious words" against the governor at the time. Despite at least one member of the jury being a former legal client of Moseley, Governor Eden's attorney obtained a conviction.

The conviction was merely a slap on the wrist, for Moseley became surveyor-general again in 1723. He was appointed Treasurer of the Province in 1735, a position he held until his death.

As a member of "the Family," elite South Carolinian planters who tried to usurp the Lower Cape Fear from the king, he legislatively supported Brunswick Town's founder, brother-in-law Maurice Moore, during the royal government's attempt to restore order in 1732–33. Royal authorities created the successful port town of Wilmington from the opposition. Later, Moseley removed to Brunswick Town, where he died in 1749.

== Personal life ==
In August 1705 Moseley married the former Ann Lillington, widow of Governor Henderson Walker and daughter of Major Alexander Lillington, in the eastern Chowan District of North Carolina. Edward became allied with the Lillingtons and other prominent families. He and Ann had two sons.

After Ann's death, Moseley married Ann Sampson and moved from Edenton to Brunswick Town. They had a large family of sons and daughters.

== See also ==
- North Carolina–Tennessee–Virginia Corners
