= David A. Jenkins =

American politician

14th State Treasurer of North Carolina
- In office 1868–1876
- Preceded by: Kemp P. Battle
- Succeeded by: John M. Worth

Personal details
- Born: April 5, 1822 Lincoln County, North Carolina, U.S.
- Died: September 10, 1886 (aged 64) Gastonia, North Carolina, U.S.
- Party: Republican
- Spouse: Lodema Holland (m. 1841)
- Children: 10

David Aaron Jenkins (April 5, 1822 – September 10, 1886) was a Republican politician and North Carolina State Treasurer from 1868 until 1876. His home was listed on the National Register of Historic Places before being demolished.

== Life ==
He served in the General Assembly. He was the first official elected treasurer after it became a position elected by popular vote under the Constitution of North Carolina of 1868. He resigned before the end of his term, on which Governor Curtis H. Brogden named the Democrat John M. Worth to replace him. Jenkins was the only Republican elected North Carolina State Treasurer until 2016, when Dale Folwell was elected.

His home located at Gastonia, Gaston County, North Carolina was listed on the National Register of Historic Places in 1978 as the David Jenkins House.

- David Jenkins House
- U.S. National Register of Historic Places
- Location within North Carolina Location within the United States
- Location: 1017 Church St., Gastonia, North Carolina
- Coordinates: 35°15′58″N 81°9′59″W
- Area: 1.5 acres (0.61 ha)
- Built: c.1876-1877
- Built by: Jenkins, David
- Architectural style: Greek Revival, Italianate
- NRHP reference No.: 78001956
- Added to NRHP: February 17, 1978

David Jenkins House was a historic home located at Gastonia, Gaston County, North Carolina. It was built about 1876–1877, and was a two-story, three-bay, frame farmhouse with Greek Revival and Italianate style design elements. It featured a low hip roof supported by ornamental brackets. It was built by David A. Jenkins (1822–1886), a Republican politician and North Carolina State Treasurer from 1868 until 1876. The house has been demolished.

It was listed on the National Register of Historic Places in 1978.

== Personal life ==
He married his wife, Lodema Holland, on May 20, 1841. They had ten children.

Party political offices
New title	Republican nominee for North Carolina State Treasurer; 1868, 1872	Succeeded by William H. Wheeler
Political offices
Preceded by Kemp P. Battle	Treasurer of North Carolina; 1868–1876	Succeeded by John M. Worth
