= William S. Robards =

American politician

William S. Robards served as North Carolina State Treasurer from 1827 to 1830.

Robards was a member of the North Carolina General Assembly in 1806 and 1808, representing Granville County, where he also served as County Attorney. In 1827, Robards was elected to succeed the late John Haywood as Treasurer and faced the unhappy duty of presiding over an office clouded with much controversy while the shortages in the accounts of his predecessor were uncovered. Following a single term as Treasurer, at the end of which he declined to run for re-election, Robards served for many years as clerk of the North Carolina Supreme Court. He was a close personal friend of U.S. Senator Willie P. Mangum.

Political offices
Preceded by John Haywood	Treasurer of North Carolina; 1827–1830	Succeeded by William S. Mhoon
