= Richard H. Moore =

American politician (born 1960)

Richard Moore

26th Treasurer of North Carolina
- In office January 6, 2001 – January 10, 2009
- Governor: Mike Easley
- Preceded by: Harlan Boyles
- Succeeded by: Janet Cowell

Secretary of the North Carolina Department of Public Safety
- In office December 1995 – November 1999
- Governor: Jim Hunt
- Preceded by: Thurman B. Hampton
- Succeeded by: David E. Kelly

Member of the North Carolina House of Representatives from the 22nd district
- In office January 1, 1993 – January 1, 1995 Serving with Mike Wilkins
- Preceded by: Jim Crawford
- Succeeded by: Jim Crawford

Personal details
- Born: August 30, 1960 (age 66) Oxford, North Carolina, U.S.
- Party: Democratic
- Spouse: Noel Moore
- Profession: Lawyer / farmer

Richard Hancock Moore (born August 30, 1960) is an American politician who was the North Carolina State Treasurer from 2001–2009. He was first elected to that post in 2000 and re-elected in 2004.

== Career ==
Moore earned both his undergraduate and law degrees from Wake Forest University and a graduate diploma in accounting and finance from the London School of Economics.

A former assistant U.S. Attorney, Moore previously served in North Carolina government as a member of the North Carolina House of Representatives and as head of the North Carolina Department of Crime Control and Public Safety under former Governor Jim Hunt, before being elected state treasurer in 2000. In 1994, he ran for United States House of Representatives but lost in that year's Republican wave to David Funderburk. As Secretary of Crime Control & Public Safety, Moore managed the state response to and recovery from several natural disasters, particularly Hurricane Floyd. He is the co-author of a book, Faces from the Flood: Hurricane Floyd Remembered.

As Treasurer, Moore championed a national movement to protect shareholder rights against Wall Street corporate abuses. He authored investment and mutual fund protection principles which have been adopted by pension fund managers across the country. His efforts led to his appointment on the executive board of the New York Stock Exchange as the only public sector member, and he has served on the board of NYSE Regulation since its inception in 2005. He was also named the country's Top Public Official of the Year in 2004 by Governing Magazine, and profiled by U.S. News & World Report (June 7, 2004). In 2005, Moore was named as a finalist for Institutional Investor's Excellence in Investment Management Award.

As North Carolina's Treasurer and Chief Investment Officer, Moore managed more than $70 billion in pension funds. The funds were rated either the first or second best funded pension plans in the country by Standard & Poor's throughout Moore's tenure. In his final year as Treasurer (2008), the funds outperformed their peer average by more than 900 basis points.

Moore ran for Governor of North Carolina in 2008. He lost the Democratic primary to Lt. Gov. Beverly Perdue on May 6, 2008. In 2012, Moore said he would consider seeking the Democratic nomination for governor again, but he did not ultimately run.

After leaving office, Moore was named to the Board of Trustees of Wake Forest University, his alma mater.

In 2012, Moore became Chief Executive Officer of First Bancorp, a $12.6 billion regional bank with more than 115 branches in North and South Carolina. Since taking over, First Bank's market cap has grown from $150 million to $2.1 billion. He is also Chair of the bank's Board of Directors. In 2019, he was named CEO of the Year by Business N.C Magazine.

== Personal life ==
Moore and his wife, Noel, have three children: Will (the eldest), Charles, and Mary. Moore is a grandson of former U.S. Rep. Franklin Wills Hancock, Jr.

Eisenhower Fellowships selected Richard Moore as a USA Eisenhower Fellow in 2006.

Party political offices
| Preceded by Harlan E. Boyles | Democratic nominee for North Carolina State Treasurer; 2000, 2004 | Succeeded by Janet Cowell |
North Carolina House of Representatives
| Preceded by Jim Crawford | Member of the North Carolina House of Representatives from the 22nd district 1993-1995; Served alongside: Michael Satterfield Wilkins | Succeeded by Jim Crawford |
Political offices
| Preceded by Harlan Boyles | Treasurer of North Carolina; 2001–2009 | Succeeded by Janet Cowell |
