= Edwin M. Gill =

American politician and lawyer (1899–1978)

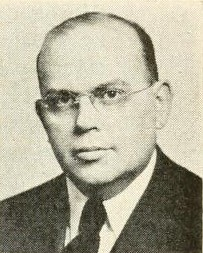
- Gill circa 1961

North Carolina State Treasurer
- In office July 20, 1953 – January 8, 1977
- Preceded by: Brandon P. Hodges
- Succeeded by: Harlan E. Boyles

Personal details
- Born: July 20, 1899 Laurinburg, North Carolina, United States
- Died: July 16, 1978 (aged 78)
- Party: Democratic
- Education: Trinity College

Edwin Maurice Gill (July 20, 1899 – July 16, 1978) was an American politician, lawyer, and public finance official who served as North Carolina State Treasurer from 1953 to 1977.

== Early life ==
Edwin Gill was born in Laurinburg, North Carolina, United States on July 20, 1899, to Thomas Jeffries Gill and Mamie North Gill. His father was a banker and at one point served as mayor of Laurinburg. He graduated from Laurinburg High School and studied at Trinity College from 1922 to 1924, leaving once he passed the North Carolina State Bar examination. He also studied for one year at the New York School of Fine and Applied Arts. He never married.

== Career ==
Gill practiced law with the firm Gibson and Gill from 1924 to 1931. A member of the Democratic Party, he was elected to the North Carolina House of Representatives to represent Scotland County in the 1929 and 1931 legislative sessions. He served on the subcommittees that drafted the Local Government Act and the bill authorizing the state to assume responsibility over the construction and maintenance of county roads. He also supported legislation for the Australian ballot, workers' compensation, consolidation of the University of North Carolina, and state benefits for the blind. North Carolina Governor O. Max Gardner rewarded Gill for supporting his legislative program by appointing him Secretary to the Governor on July 1, 1931. He remained in that post throughout the rest of Gardiner's tenure until 1933. He also became a key member of Gardner's political organization, the Shelby Dynasty.

In 1933 Governor John C. B. Ehringhaus appointed Gill head of the nascent North Carolina Paroles Commission, where he organized the body and developed its procedures. In 1942 he left the job when Governor J. Melville Broughton appointed him Commissioner of Revenue. Gill held the office until 1949 when an anti-Shelby candidate, W. Kerr Scott, became governor. He moved to Washington, D.C., to join a law firm founded by O. Max Gardner, Gardner, Morrison & Rogers. Gill disliked Washington and in 1950, U.S. Senator Frank Porter Graham convinced President Harry Truman to appoint Gill as Collector and Director of Internal Revenue in North Carolina. On July 20, 1953, Governor William B. Umstead appointed him North Carolina State Treasurer. He was elected to finish the term on November 2, 1954. Gill was elected to a full four-year term on November 6, 1956, and was subsequently reelected in 1960, 1964, 1968, and 1972, facing serious competition in only two of these contests. Under his tenure, North Carolina first received a triple A bond credit rating in the early 1960s and maintained the rating throughout the rest of his time in office. Umstead died in office and was succeeded by Lieutenant Governor Luther H. Hodges. Gill became a key advisor to Hodges under these circumstances. When Hodges was succeeded by Terry Sanford, Gill reportedly attempted to approach the new governor in a similar manner, but was rebuffed to his embarrassment. As a child Sanford had delivered newspapers to Gill's home. He considered seeking gubernatorial office in 1960 but he never cultivated any popular support for such a candidacy. He declined to run for re-election in 1976 and left office on January 8, 1977.

== Later life ==
Upon Gill's retirement, the North Carolina Bankers Association funded the creation of the Edwin Gill Professorship in business management at North Carolina State University. In his later life Gill painted as a hobby and served on the board of trustees of the North Carolina State Art Society. He drafted two manuscripts which remained unpublished at the time of his death. He founded the Edwin Gill Theatre Project in 1963 to showcase drama to North Carolina schools. He died on July 16, 1978, and was buried at Hillside Cemetery in Laurinburg.

== Works cited ==
- Albright, R. Mayne (April 1983). "O. Max Gardner And The Shelby Dynasty (Part I)". The State. Vol. 50, no. 11. pp. 8–11, 27.
- Cheney, John L. Jr., ed. (1975). North Carolina Manual. Raleigh: North Carolina Secretary of State. OCLC 436873840.
- Covington, Howard E. Jr; Ellis, Marion A. (1999). Terry Sanford: Politics, Progress, and Outrageous Ambitions. Durham: Duke University Press. ISBN 9780822323563.
- Covington, Howard E.; Ellis, Marion A., eds. (2002). The North Carolina Century: Tar Heels who Made a Difference, 1900–2000. Levine Museum of the New South. ISBN 9780807827574.
- North Carolina Manual. Raleigh: North Carolina Secretary of State. 2001. OCLC 436873840.

Party political offices
Preceded by Brandon P. Hodges	Democratic nominee for North Carolina State Treasurer; 1954, 1956, 1960, 1964, 1968, 1972	Succeeded by Harlan E. Boyles
Political offices
Preceded by Brandon P. Hodges	Treasurer of North Carolina; 1953–1977	Succeeded by Harlan E. Boyles
