= Harlan E. Boyles =

American politician (1929–2003)

Harlan Edward Boyles Sr.

Treasurer of North Carolina
- In office January 8, 1977 – 2001
- Governor: Jim Hunt; James G. Martin
- Preceded by: Edwin M. Gill
- Succeeded by: Richard H. Moore

Harlan E. Boyles (May 6, 1929 – January 23, 2003) was a politician and public servant in North Carolina, who served as North Carolina State Treasurer from January 1977 to January 2001.

Boyles grew up in Lincoln County, North Carolina, where his father farmed and owned a country store. As a boy, Boyles was afflicted with polio. He attended the University of Georgia and then transferred to the University of North Carolina at Chapel Hill, where he earned an accounting degree in 1951.

Boyles went to work for the state, first in the state Department of Revenue and later for the Tax Study Commission. For sixteen years, he was Deputy State Treasurer for Treasurer Edwin M. Gill. When Gill retired, Boyles ran for the office as a Democrat in the 1976 election and won. Boyles was sworn in as State Treasurer on January 8, 1977. He was re-elected in 1980, 1984, 1988, 1992, and 1996, for a total of twenty-four years in office. He did not seek re-election in 2000.

Boyles died of cancer at his home in Raleigh on January 23, 2003.

Boyles also authored the book, "Keeper of the Public Purse" detailing his life as Treasurer.

Party political offices
Preceded by Edwin M. Gill	Democratic nominee for North Carolina State Treasurer; 1976, 1980, 1984, 1988, 1992, 1996	Succeeded by Richard H. Moore
Political offices
Preceded by Edwin M. Gill	Treasurer of North Carolina; 1977–2001	Succeeded by Richard H. Moore
