= John Brown (North Carolina politician) =

American politician

John Brown (1738–1812) was a teacher, farmer, and statesman from Wilkes County, North Carolina. He was a Captain in the Wilkes County Regiment of the North Carolina militia during the Revolutionary War, served as one of the state Treasurers (1782–1784), and served in the North Carolina state legislature (1784–1787).

== Background and family ==
John Brown was born in County Londonderry, Ireland in 1738, and about 1750 his family emigrated to Pennsylvania. He matured there and taught school in Lancaster County.

In 1770 he married Jane McDowell (1750–1833), the sister of Joseph McDowell. The couple settled into frontier life near her brothers. They built a farm on the banks of the Yadkin River in Surry County, North Carolina. They would have eleven children: James (1771), William (1774), Elizabeth (1776), John (1780), Ann (1782), Hugh (1784), Hamilton (1786), Thomas (1788), Margaret (1790) and Allen (1793). Elizabeth would marry James Stewart who became a U.S. Congressman. Most of their children would extend the frontier even further, moving to western Virginia and Tennessee.

== Public career ==
The farm prospered as the family grew and John become prominent in his community. He joined the Masons and became a captain of the local militia. In 1777 when Wilkes County was organized, the first meeting of the Court of the new county was held in his home, and he was appointed Justice of the Peace. Throughout the remainder of his life he held a number of county offices, such as recorder.

He was a captain in the Wilkes County Regiment under Colonel Benjamin Cleveland from 1780 to 1781. In 1780, he marched his militia company south with Colonel Cleveland's force. Meeting other patriot forces at the Catawba River, they finally caught up with the British expeditionary force at King's mountain, on the South Carolina border. They were part of the overwhelming victory in the Battle of King's Mountain on October 7, 1780. The company returned with glory. Brown was later promoted to Colonel.

As North Carolina struggled to resolve the debts raised during the revolution, Brown was named as state treasurer for his district in 1782. He served until the districts were consolidated in 1784. That same year he was elected to North Carolina's House of Commons, or the lower branch of the legislature. He was re-elected and served until 1787. In 1788 he was a delegate to the state convention in Hillsborough that ratified the United States Constitution in 1789 after its rejection in 1788.

He died in 1812, at home on his farm in Wilkes County about 4 miles west of Wilkesboro.

== See also ==
- Salisbury District Brigade
- Wilkes County, North Carolina
