= George Plummer =

American politician

George Plummer (December 1, 1785 – June 2, 1872) was an American lawyer, farmer, and politician. Plummer, a native of Glastonbury, Connecticut and the son of Isaac and Abigail E (née Mills) Plummer, was born December 1, 1785. He graduated from Yale College in 1804. He studied law with his uncle, Judge Mills of New Haven, until his admission to the bar in March, 1807. He then settled in Glastenbury, and continued in the practice of law, until the death of his father, in April, 1812, obliged him to choose between the abandonment of the farm which he inherited and his profession. He decided on the life of a farmer, and never returned to the law.

During the summer of 1814 he was in active service in the war with Great Britain. In 1844 and 1851 Mr. Plummer represented the 2nd District in the Connecticut State Senate, and during both years was ex officio a member of the Corporation of Yale College. He was chosen as a Deacon of the Congregational Church in Glastenbury, in 1827, and held that office until his death, which occurred on the 2nd of June, 1872.

He married, on May 7, 1807, Anne, eldest daughter of Rev. William Lockwood of Glastenbury. She died December 25, 1859. Of their three children, two daughters died in early married life (one of them was married to Samuel Rockwell), and one son survived.
