= North Carolina State Treasurer =

North Carolina Elected Official

State Treasurer of North Carolina
- Seal of the North Carolina Department of the Treasury

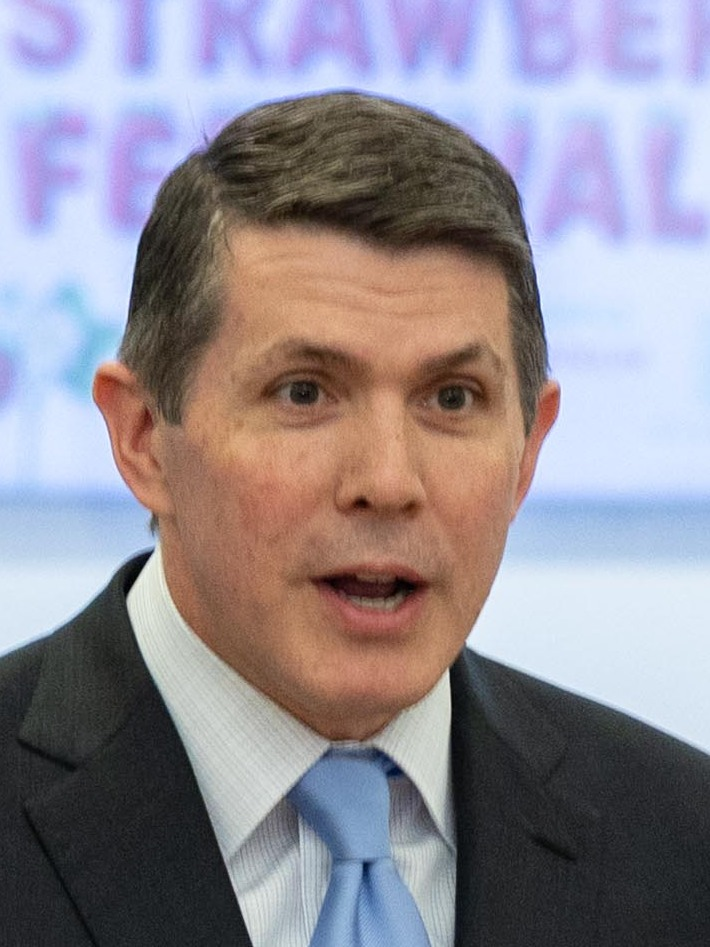
- Incumbent; Brad Briner since January 1, 2025
- Member of: Council of State
- Seat: Raleigh, North Carolina
- Term length: Four years, no term limit
- Inaugural holder: Memucan Hunt
- Formation: 1715 Province of North Carolina; January 1, 1784 (242 years ago) State of North Carolina
- Website: www.nctreasurer.com

The North Carolina State Treasurer is a statewide elected office in the U.S. state of North Carolina responsible for overseeing the financial operations of state government. The current state treasurer is Brad Briner.

The office of state treasurer has existed since 1715 in the Province of North Carolina; at that time, the treasurer was appointed by the lower house of the legislature. In 1740, the treasurer's office was divided into two districts, and in 1779, into four. In 1784, the North Carolina General Assembly brought the treasurers under one single office, appointed jointly by both houses of the legislature.

Under the North Carolina Constitution of 1868, the treasurer became a position elected by popular vote, rather than appointed.

The North Carolina State Treasurer is an ex officio member of the North Carolina State Board of Education, the State Board of Community Colleges, the State Banking Commission, and the Council of State.

== History of the office ==
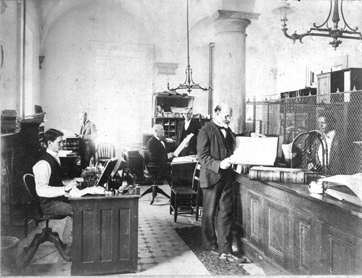
North Carolina State Treasurer's Office in State Capitol, c. 1890s

The Fundamental Constitutions of Carolina, adopted in 1669, provided for a treasurer to handle "all matters that concern the public revenue and treasury" with the assistance of 6 undertreasurers and 12 auditors. Despite this, early colonial governors of the Province of Carolina acted as their own treasurers due to minimal revenue. After the province incurred large debts during Cary's Rebellion and the Tuscarora War, the governor and his council appointed treasurers for each of the seven precincts of the province in 1711. In 1714 Governor Edward Hyde appointed Edward Moseley as treasurer of North Carolina and overseer of all precinct treasurers. He held the office until 1735, when he was made responsible for overseeing the "southern district" and William Downing was made responsible for the "northern district". The split system continued with different officeholders until 1776, when the North Carolina General Assembly required all treasurers to be appointed by themselves and barred them from holding other public offices.

In 1779 and 1782, four and one additional treasury districts were respectively added, bring the total number to seven. In 1784, the positions were folded into one office located in Hillsborough with a two-year term on a salary. Memucan Hunt was the first person to hold the new office. In 1795, the state treasury was relocated to Raleigh, the new capital of the state, and some of the treasurer's bookkeeping functions were given to the state comptroller. In 1868 North Carolina ratified a new constitution which stipulated that the office be filled by a popularly elected candidate with four-year terms. From 1887 to 1899, the treasurer was responsible for oversight of the state banking industry.

North Carolina received a triple A bond credit rating for the first time in the early 1960s—during the tenure of State Treasurer Edwin M. Gill—and maintained the rating throughout the rest of his time in office. The Department of State Treasurer was created by the General Assembly in 1971. In 2025, the General Assembly passed the 2025 State Investment Modernization Act, which removed the sole fiduciary responsibility from the treasurer and assigned it to the new North Carolina Investment Authority. John Haywood, who served for 40 years from 1787 until 1827, was the longest-tenured treasurer. Janet Cowell, who assumed office in 2009, was the first woman to serve as state treasurer. The incumbent, Brad Briner, has served as treasurer since January 2, 2025.

== Powers, duties, and structure ==
The state treasurer is a constitutional officer. Article III, Section 7, of the Constitution of North Carolina stipulates the popular election of the treasurer every four years. The office holder is not subject to term limits. In the event of a vacancy in the office, the Governor of North Carolina has the authority to appoint a successor until a candidate is elected at the next general election for members of the General Assembly. They sit on the North Carolina Council of State and are ex officio chairman of the State Banking Commission, member of the State Board of Education, and member of the State Board of Community Colleges. They are sixth in line of succession to the governor.

The treasurer leads the Department of State Treasurer, which has six divisions: Retirement Systems Division, State Health Plan Division, Investment Management Division, State and Local Government Finance Division, Financial Operations Division, and Unclaimed Property Division. The Local Government Commission is a subagency of the department and the treasurer serves ex officio as chairman of the body. The treasurer is an ex officio member of the board of directors of the North Carolina Investment Authority. As with all Council of State officers, the treasurer's salary is fixed by the General Assembly and cannot be reduced during their term of office. As of 2025, the treasurer's annual salary is $168,384.

== List of State Treasurers ==
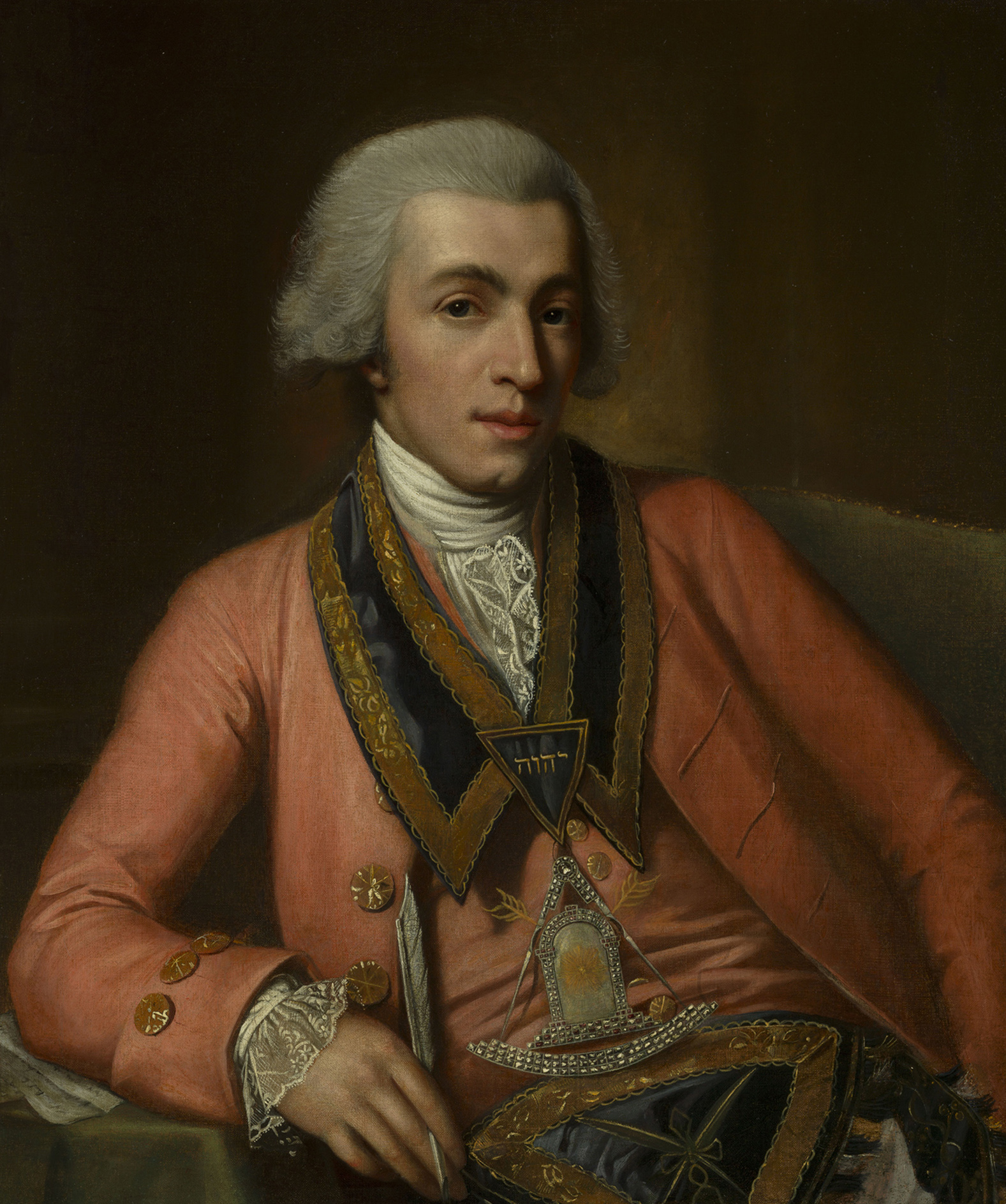
Joseph Montfort

=== Colonial Treasurers ===
- Edward Moseley, 1715–1735

==== Northern District ====
- William Downing, 1735–1739
- William Smith, 1739–1740
- John Hodgson, 1740–1747
- Thomas Barker, 1748–1752
- John Haywood, 1752–1754
- Thomas Barker, 1754–1764
- Joseph Montfort, 1764–1775
- Samuel Johnston, 1775

==== Southern District ====
- Edward Moseley, 1735–1749
- Eleazer Allen, 1749–1750
- John Starkey, 1750–1765
- Samuel Swann, 1765–1766
- John Ashe, 1766–1773
- Richard Caswell, 1773–1775

=== State Treasurers ===
==== Districted ====
From 1777 to 1779, the State was divided into two districts, Northern and Southern, each with a treasurer. From 1779 to 1782, there were six districts, each with a treasurer, as follows: Edenton, Salisbury, Hillsboro, Halifax, New Bern, Wilmington. In 1782, a seventh district-Morgan-was created. In 1784, the district system was abandoned.

- John Ashe, 1777–1781 (Southern District, later Wilmington District)
- William Skinner, 1777–1784 (Northern District, later Edenton district)
- Green Hill, 1779–1784 (Halifax District)
- Richard Cogdell, 1779–1782 (New Bern District)
- William Cathey, 1779–1781 (Salisbury District)
- Matthew Jones, 1779–1782 (Hillsboro District)
- Timothy Bloodworth, 1781–1784 (Wilmington District)
- Robert Lanier, 1782–1784 (Salisbury District)
- Memucan Hunt, 1782–1784 (Hillsboro District)
- John Brown, 1782–1784 (Morgan District)
- Benjamin Exum, 1782–1784 (New Bern District)

==== Whole state ====
State Treasurers (legislatively appointed)
No.	State Treasurer	Term in office	Source
1	Memucan Hunt	1784 – 1787	
2	John Haywood	1787 – 1827	
3	William S. Robards	1827 – 1830	
4	William S. Mhoon	1831 – 1835	
5	Samuel F. Patterson	1835 – 1837	
6	Daniel W. Courts	1837 – 1839	
7	Charles L. Hinton	1839 – 1843	
8	John H. Wheeler	1843 – 1845	
9	Charles L. Hinton	1845 – 1851	
10	Daniel W. Courts	1851 – 1863	
11	Jonathan Worth	1863 – 1865	
12	William Sloan	1865 – 1866	
13	Kemp P. Battle	1866 – 1868	

State Treasurers (elected)
No.	State Treasurer	Term in office	Party	Source
14	David A. Jenkins	1868 – 1876	Republican	
15	John M. Worth	1876 – 1885	Democratic	
16	Donald W. Bain	1885 – 1892	Democratic	
17	Samuel McDowell Tate	1892 – 1895	Democratic	
18	William H. Worth	1895 – 1901	Populist	
19	Benjamin R. Lacy	1901 – 1929	Democratic	
20	Nathan O'Berry	1929 – 1932	Democratic	
21	John P. Stedman	1932	Democratic	
22	Charles M. Johnson	1933 – 1949	Democratic	
23	Brandon P. Hodges	1949 – 1953	Democratic	
24	Edwin M. Gill	1953 – 1977	Democratic	
25	Harlan E. Boyles	1977 – 2001	Democratic	
26	Richard H. Moore	2001 – 2009	Democratic	
27	Janet Cowell	2009 – 2017	Democratic	
28	Dale Folwell	2017 – 2025	Republican	
29	Brad Briner	2025 – present	Republican	

== Works cited ==
- North Carolina Manual. Raleigh: North Carolina Secretary of State. 2001. OCLC 436873840.
- North Carolina Manual (PDF). Raleigh: North Carolina Department of the Secretary of State. 2011. OCLC 2623953. Archived from the original (PDF) on 2023-08-02.
- Orth, John V.; Newby, Paul M. (2013). The North Carolina State Constitution (second ed.). Oxford University Press. ISBN 9780199300655.
- Parker, Adam C. (January 2013). "Still as Moonlight: Why Tax Increment Financing Stalled in North Carolina". North Carolina Law Review. 91 (2): 661–719.
