= Samuel Rockwell =

American politician (1803–1880)

Samuel Rockwell (April 18, 1803 – December 25, 1880) was an American minister and politician.

Rockwell, second son of Alpha and Rhoda (Ensign) Rockwell, of Winchester, Conn., was born in that town, April 18, 1803.

He graduated from Yale College in 1825. He spent the two years after graduation in the Andover Theological Seminary, but finished his professional studies at the Yale Divinity School in 1828. His first pastorate was over the Congregational Church in Plainfield, Conn., from April 11, 1832, to April 16, 1841. At the end of his tenure as a pastor, Rockwell published a sermon entitled "Influence of Religion upon National Prosperity and True Liberty" in 1841.

He was installed pastor of the South Congregational Church in New Britain, Conn., Jan 4, 1843, and resigned this charge, June 20, 1858. His residence continued in New Britain.

In 1862 and 1869 he represented the town in the Connecticut Legislature; and in 1865 he was elected to the Connecticut State Senate, and as senator became ex officio a member of the Corporation of Yale College where he is named as a Fellow under President Rev.Theodore D. Woolsey. He served as Treasurer of the Savings Bank of New Britain for many years after its incorporation in 1862.

He was stricken with paralysis on the night of December 21, 1880, and died four days later, at his home, at age 78.

He was married on June 6, 1833, to Julia Ann, daughter of the Hon. George Plummer, of Glastonbury, Conn. She died April 7, 1838, and he remarried on May 5, 1840 to Elizabeth, daughter of Judge Elkanah C. Eaton, of Plainfield. She died April 18, 1843. He again remarried on July 29, 1844 to Charlotte, daughter of Major Seth J. North, of New Britain, and the widow of John Stanley, of New Britain. An only son, by the first marriage, survived him: an only daughter, by the second marriage, died in 1866.
