= Kemp Plummer =

American politician (1769–1826)

Kemp Plummer (1769 – January 19, 1826) was an American lawyer and politician. He was educated by George Wythe, once known as "the honest lawyer", and represented Warren County, North Carolina in the North Carolina House of Commons and later the North Carolina State Senate. He was a trustee of the University of North Carolina and grandfather of Kemp Plummer Battle.

Plummer was part of the "Warren Junto" which included Nathaniel Macon, who married Kemp's sister Hannah, James Turner, Weldon Edwards, William Hawkins, and William Miller, who dominated North Carolina political life at that time. Plummer's sister Hannah married Nathaniel Macon.

Kemp Plummer was the second owner of the oldest house in Warrenton. The original owner was Marmaduke Johnson, who married Macon's half-sister Hixie Ransom. Another Plummer brother was William Plummer II, who married Macon's half-sister Betsy Ransom.

Plummer's plantation also had several black slaves.

Plummer died from gout in 1826.

== Early life ==
Kemp Plummer was born in 1769 near Mobjack Bay in Gloucester County, Virginia to William Plummer and Mary Hayes. After the death of his father around 1774, his mother moved the family to North Carolina due to "the cheaper lands and the superior healthiness of the hill country of North Carolina."

Plummer attended Hampden-Sydney College and graduated with the first class in 1786. He then attended the College of William & Mary and studied with George Wythe. Rather than stay in Virginia, he moved to North Carolina to practice law.
