= Kemp P. Battle =

American politician

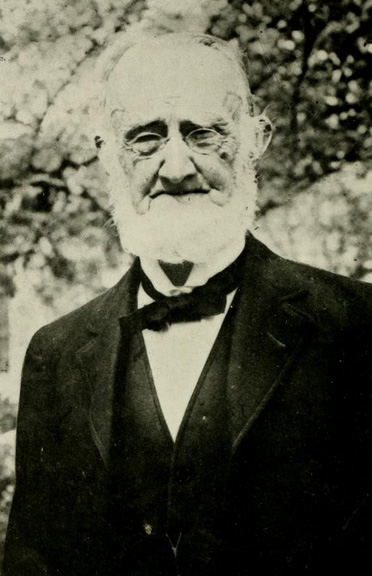
- Battle pictured in Yackety Yak 1919, UNC yearbook

President of the University of North Carolina
- In office 1876–1891
- Preceded by: Charles Phillips
- Succeeded by: George Tayloe Winston

Treasurer of North Carolina
- In office 1866–1868
- Governor: Jonathan Worth
- Preceded by: William Sloan
- Succeeded by: David A. Jenkins

Personal details
- Born: December 19, 1831 Louisburg, North Carolina
- Died: February 4, 1919 (aged 87) Raleigh, North Carolina
- Education: University of North Carolina
- Profession: Lawyer, Politician, Educator, Historian

Kemp Plummer Battle (December 19, 1831 – February 4, 1919) was an American lawyer, railroad president, university president, educator, and historian. He served as North Carolina State Treasurer and as president of the University of North Carolina in the nineteenth century.

== Biography ==
=== Early years ===
Battle was born on December 19, 1831, the son of William Horn Battle and Lucy Martin Plummer Battle. Battle spent his early childhood in Louisburg, North Carolina, where his father practiced law and was active in politics. His grandfather was "the honest lawyer" Kemp Plummer. He enrolled in the University of North Carolina at Chapel Hill in 1845 and graduated in 1849 as the valedictorian of his class. He was also a member of the Dialectic Society while attending UNC. During the next five years he worked at the university, as tutor of Latin and then as tutor of mathematics, while studying law under the tutelage of his father. He was admitted to the bar in 1854 and began a practice in Raleigh. In 1857, he was named a director of the rechartered Bank of North Carolina.

=== Civil War ===
In 1861 Battle was a delegate to the Secession Convention and signed the Ordinance of Secession. During the Civil War he served as president of the Chatham Railroad which existed primarily to haul coal from the mines in Chatham County to Confederate armament factories.

In 1862, Battle was elected by the legislature to serve as a trustee of the University and held this position until 1868, when the entire board was thrown out by the Reconstruction General Assembly. He was elected Treasurer by the legislature in 1866 but removed from office in 1868 by the occupying U.S. military authorities because of his service to the Confederacy.

=== University of North Carolina ===
In 1874, Battle was reappointed a trustee to the University. He was named president of the University in 1876 and served ably until 1891, when he resigned to become Alumni Professor of History. He became a distinguished historian and compiled a significant body of scholarly work, the most prominent piece being his two-volume History of the University of North Carolina which is still today considered a significant study.

Battle "did much to make the teaching of history according to modern methods, as well as the collection, presentation, and diffusion of the results of historical research, a respectable and respected enterprise at an influential southern institution of higher education." Edwin Alderman declared that "under Dr. Battle's wise and sympathetic direction the history department of the University enriched and invigorated the intellectual life of the institution, causing history to be regarded by those under his guidance as no longer merely informational and conventional in value, but a department of the great science of sociology."

He received a Doctor of Law degree from Davidson College in 1882, and also from UNC in 1910.

Battle married Martha Ann Battle, with whom he had three daughters and four sons. Battle is buried in Historic Oakwood Cemetery.

== Legacy ==
The Dialectic and Philanthropic Societies, the oldest student group on UNC's campus, used to hold a history lecture in Battle's name and honor every year on the eve of University Day. However, the Societies have renamed and rededicated this lecture because of Battle's actions and legacy, which are inconsistent with their own values.

Party political offices
| First | Democratic nominee for North Carolina State Treasurer; 1868 | Succeeded by John W. Graham |
Political offices
| Preceded by William Sloan | Treasurer of North Carolina; 1866–1868 | Succeeded by David A. Jenkins |
