= 1861 Confederate States presidential election in North Carolina =

- November 6, 1861
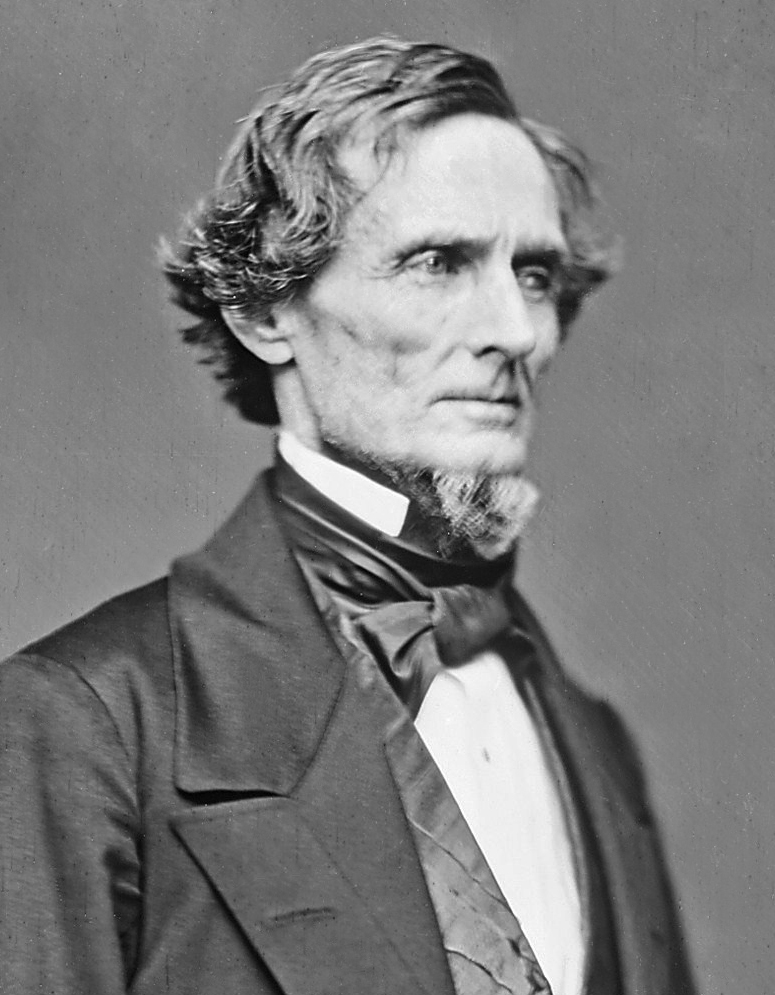

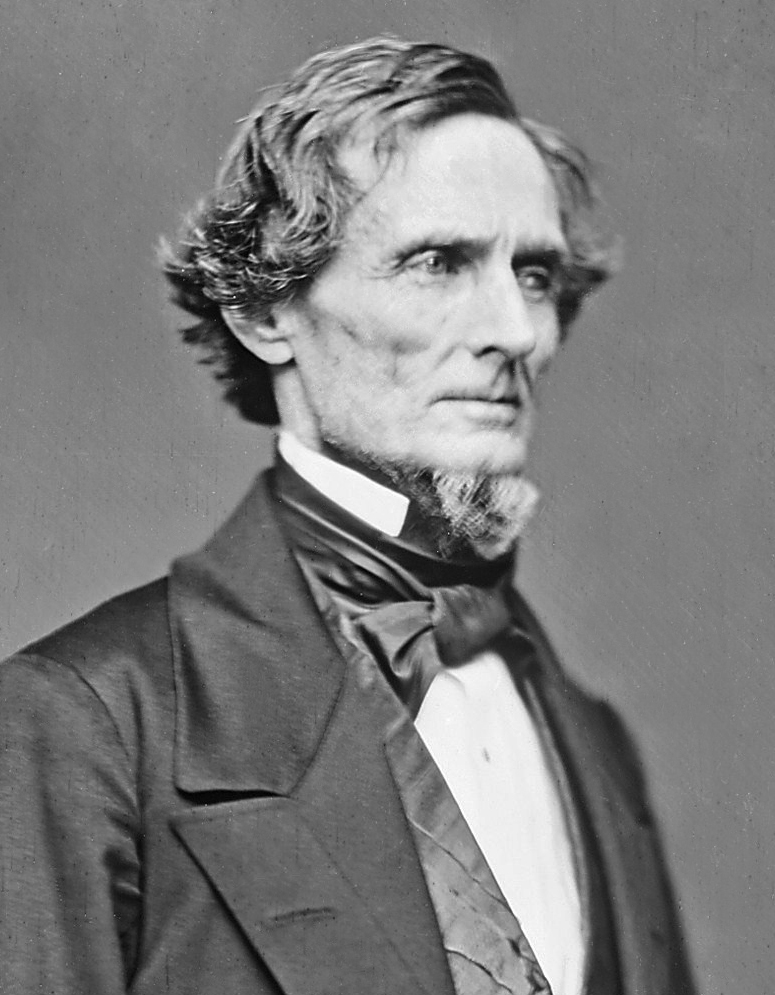
Nominee	Jefferson Davis	Jefferson Davis
Party	Nonpartisan	Nonpartisan
Alliance	Secessionist	Conservative
Home state	Mississippi	Mississippi
Running mate	Alexander H. Stephens	Alexander H. Stephens
Electoral vote	12	0
Popular vote	27,400	19,507
Percentage	54.95%	39.12%
- County results (Note: The full returns of 24 counties were reported in the November 18 issue of the Fayetteville Observer. and the return of Johnston County was reported in the November 13 issue of the Weekly State Journal.) Davis (secessionist slate) 70–80% 80–90% 90–100% Davis (people's ticket) 50–60% 60–70% 70–80% 80–90% 90–100% No data
President before election
Jefferson Davis (Provisional)
Nonpartisan
Elected President
Jefferson Davis
Nonpartisan

A presidential election was held in North Carolina on November 6, 1861 as part of the 1861 Confederate States presidential election. The secessionist ticket led by William B. Rodman defeated the conservative, or people's ticket. Both lists were pledged to the incumbent provisional president Jefferson Davis and the provisional vice president Alexander H. Stephens. Davis won the national election unanimously, beginning a six-year term that would terminate prematurely on May 5, 1865 following the dissolution of the Confederate government.

Unlike most Confederate states, where electors were selected by the state legislature, North Carolina selected its 12 electors on a general ticket. Each elector on a slate represented a specific district, and the 12 elector candidates who received the highest number of votes were chosen to represent the state in the Electoral College, where they cast their votes for the president and vice president.

Two lists of electors were pledged to Davis, representing developing local factions. The "secessionist slate", led by William B. Rodman, consisted of "original secessionists" who had supported secession from early on. They were opposed by the "people's ticket" made up of former Unionists. Former Unionist William Woods Holden would eventually form the "Conservative" party, a political coalition of former Unionists opposed to Governor Henry Toole Clark, and gave his support to the people's ticket in this election.

The election itself was muddy, with supporters of the opposite view appearing on each of the slates, including four who appeared on both slates and two others who were listed on partially different tickets — one of whom had withdrawn but still appeared on several tickets. Nevertheless, the secessionist slate won out, with its best-performing sole elector winning 27,400 votes, beating the people's ticket's 19,507.

== Background ==
In the aftermath of the 1860 presidential election, despite calls from Governor John Willis Ellis for secession, North Carolinians were reluctant to secede from the Union. Lawmakers in the General Assembly felt that Abraham Lincoln's victory was not a sufficient cause for secession, and the general populace believed that the Constitution would protect their rights from Lincoln's administration. When a vote was held in Februaryr 1861 on whether to call a secession convention, the proposal was rejected by voters.

Despite this, both secessionist and Unionist factions remained active throughout the state, holding meetings to rally support. Governor Ellis, anticipating conflict, began organizing military training camps and preparing troops. Unionists, meanwhile, held out hope that Lincoln would avoid direct interference in the South, which they believed would lead to the Confederacy disbanding. William Woods Holden, a prominent Unionist, warned that secession could result in military occupation and the abolition of slavery, advocating for the creation of a local Constitutional Union Party. At a major Unionist meeting in Randolph County, citizens called for North Carolina to remain neutral and proposed the formation of a "Central Confederacy" of border states.

Following the bombardment and surrender of Fort Sumter, Lincoln called for volunteer militiamen to subdue the rebellion. This action alarmed many white men and caused most Unionists to shift their stance, leading to the state withdrawing from the Union at the May 1861 secession convention.

Initially, there was a brief moment of unity among the state's political leaders, but politicians quickly fractured into two camps: enthusiastic Confederates and reluctant Confederates. Early secessionist leaders, having taken control of the state government, excluded former Unionists from public offices and military positions. This exclusion caused resentment and deepened divisions among the state's leaders. Reflecting this partisan divide, early secessionists and former Unionists, such as Holden and Zebulon Vance, organized separate slates of electors for the 1861 Confederate States presidential election, despite both groups endorsing the same ticket.

== Results ==
The election itself was muddly with supporters of the opposite view appearing on each of the slates, including four that appeared on both slates and two others that were listed partially on different tickets — one of whom having withdrawn but still appeared on several tickets. There was also an issue with the method of counting. One candidate, who appeared on both slates, represented different districts on each. When tallying the votes, Governor Henry Toole Clark combined the results from both districts, ensuring an easy victory for that candidate. While this may not have disenfranchised voters in this instance, it had the potential to do so.

Ultimately, the secessionist slate prevailed, with its best-performing sole elector receiving 27,400 votes, compared to the people's ticket's 19,507. In addition to the votes cast for the two Davis slates, there were also 2,960 scattering votes, though no individual scattering candidate got more than 250.

The secessionist slate won most of its votes from Breckinridge Democrats and secessionists, while the "people's ticket" won most of its votes from Douglas supporters, Bell supporters, and Unionist. The secessionist voters turned out at a higher rate than the unionists, most likely due to the excitement created by the coming of war and the fact that both tickets represented the same man. This political apathy among the Unionists possibly caused the defeat of the people's ticket.

General election results
Party	Candidate	Votes	%
Nonpartisan	Jefferson Davis (secessionist slate)	27,400	54.95
Nonpartisan	Jefferson Davis (people's ticket)	19,507	39.12
	Scattering	2,960	5.94

=== Results by elector ===
Candidate	Slate/Ticket	Votes	%
L. W. Humphrey	Both	46,390	8.33
John Pool	Both	46,141	8.29
Alfred G. Foster	Both	45,953	8.26
David Settle Reid	Both	45,449	8.16
Nicholas W. Woodfin	Secessionist	27,400	4.92
Henry F. Bond	Secessionist	27,378	4.92
Anderson Mitchell	Secessionist	27,159	4.88
Weldon Edwards	Secessionist	27,077	4.86
William B. Rodman	Secessionist	27,039	4.86
John M. Long	Secessionist	26,947	4.84
Haywood W. Guion	Secessionist	26,804	4.82
William McL. McKay	Partially on both	24,489	4.40
Jesse G. Shepherd	Partially on both	20,947	3.76
Council Wooten	People's	19,507	3.50
Tod Caldwell	People's	19,316	3.47
John Walker	People's	19,270	3.46
Augustus Merrimon	People's	19,174	3.44
Bedford Brown	People's	19,169	3.44
Thomas Bragg	People's	19,162	3.44
William Graham	People's	18,919	3.40
Scattering		2,960	0.53
Total		556,650	100.00
