= Governor's Palace (Raleigh, North Carolina) =

Official residence of the Governor, 1816–1865

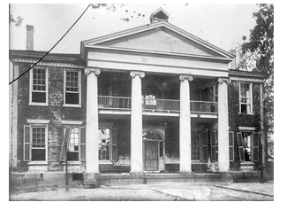
- Interactive map of the Governor's Palace area

General information
- Status: Demolished
- Type: official residence
- Architectural style: Greek Revival
- Location: Raleigh, North Carolina, U.S.
- Coordinates: 35.7713°N 78.6395°W
- Completed: 1816
- Demolished: 1885
- Owner: State of North Carolina

Design and construction
- Architect: William Nichols

The Governor's Palace was the official residence of the Governor of North Carolina during the Antebellum period. The governors and their families resided here from 1816 until 1865, when General William Tecumseh Sherman seized the palace during the Civil War and used it as his headquarters. It was demolished in 1885. Raleigh Memorial Auditorium was built on the original site of the palace.

== History ==
Colonial governors resided at Tryon Palace in New Bern, North Carolina. After the establishment of North Carolina as a state, the North Carolina General Assembly mandated that all governors must reside in Raleigh. A simple, two-story building was built along Fayetteville Street and Hargett Street in 1797. The property was in-use for thirteen years but, by 1810, Governor Benjamin Smith complained that the house was in disrepair. In 1813, the General Assembly approved plans to build a new official residence for the governors.

Construction on the palace began in 1814 and was completed in 1816, during the term of Governor William Miller, who became the first governor to reside in the palace. It was designed by William Nichols and built by James Calder. Dabney Cosby was the contractor and Henry J. Patterson was the brickmason. The palace was located along South Street and Fayetteville Street. It was modeled after the Wickham House in Richmond, Virginia. The exterior of the palace was brick, with white, columned porticos along the front porch. In the interior, there was a hall with pillars flanking each side, marking the entrances to the reception rooms on the right and left of the hall. A stair case led to an upper floor and there was a cupola on the roof, housing several seats.

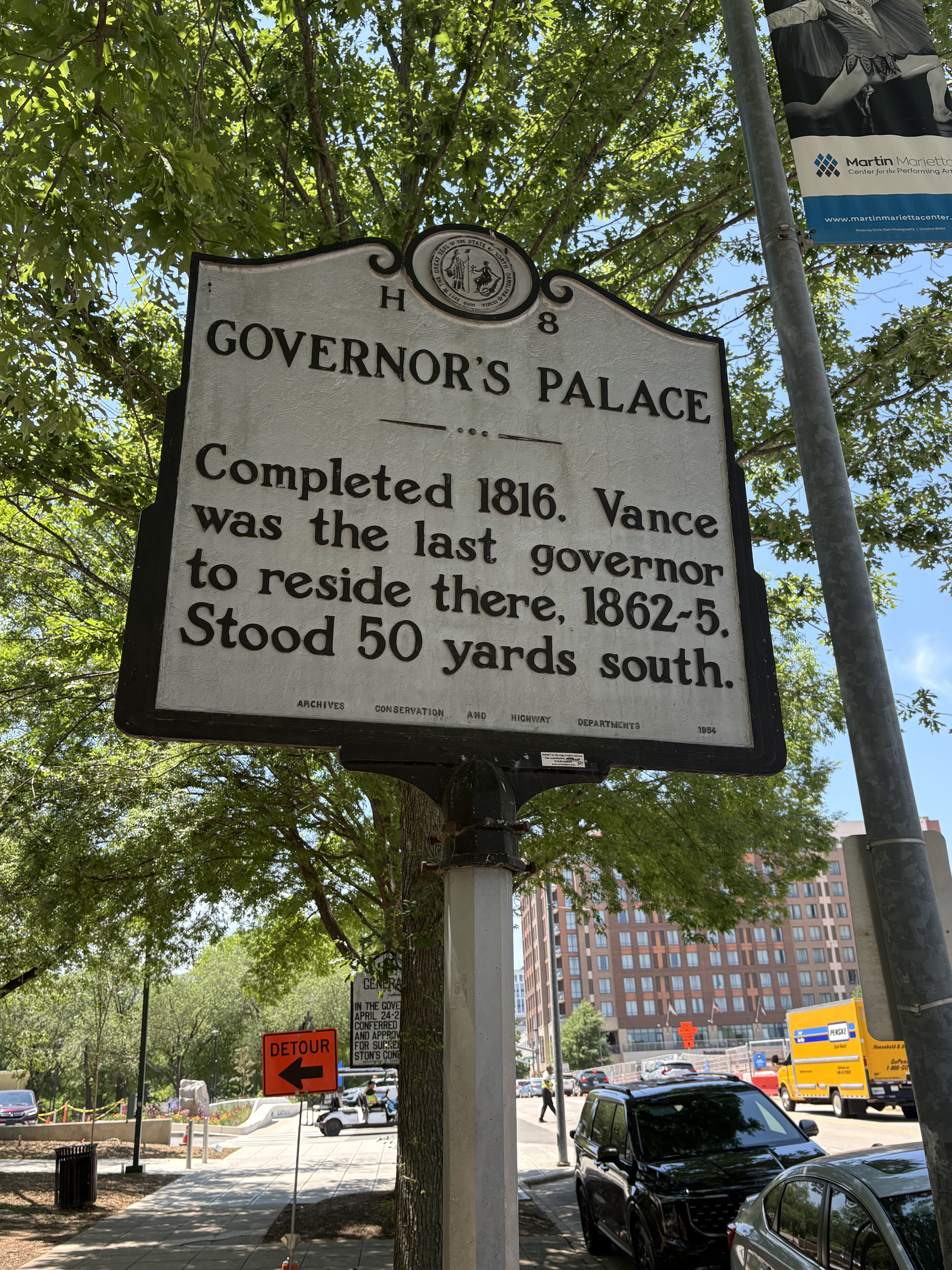
Historic marker in downtown Raleigh commemorating the palace

The governors hosted notable guests at the palace, including Gilbert du Motier, Marquis de La Fayette. When the North Carolina State House burned in 1831, the General Assembly met in the palace for several sessions, until the new North Carolina Capitol was completed. Upon the death of Governor John Willis Ellis in 1861, his successor, Henry Toole Clark, declined to live in the house to allow Ellis' widow, Mary McKinley Daves Ellis, to grieve.

The governors and their families resided in the palace until 1865, when the Union Army marched into Raleigh. Confederate Governor Zebulon Baird Vance and First Lady Harriett Newell Espy Vance were the last family to reside there before General William Tecumseh Sherman seized the palace in April 1865 during the Carolinas campaign. First Lady Vance evacuated much of the mansion's furniture to Statesville while other pieces were remanded to R. H. Bradley, keeper of the State Capitol. Sherman used the palace as his headquarters and held a meeting there with General Ulysses S. Grant to approve the new terms for the surrender of General Joseph E. Johnston's Confederate Army. The physical condition of the building significantly deteriorated while it was occupied by federal troops, and the two governors of the state in the immediate aftermath of the Civil War, Jonathan Worth and William Woods Holden, both declined to use it in favor of their private residences during their respective tenures.

The building was sold to the city of Raleigh in 1876 and housed the Centennial School for ten years. In 1877, years after the fall of the Confederacy, Vance was elected for a second term as governor. He asked the General Assembly to approve funding for a newer official residence, which was approved in 1879. In 1891, the North Carolina Executive Mansion was built at 200 North Blount Street.

The palace was demolished in 1885. In the 1930s, Raleigh Memorial Auditorium was built where the palace once stood.

== Works cited ==
- Poteat, R. Matthew (January 2007). "Part 1: "A Modest Estimate of His Own Abilities": Governor Henry Toole Clark and the Early Civil War Leadership of North Carolina". The North Carolina Historical Review. 84 (1): 1–36. JSTOR 23523278.
- Raper, Horace W. (1985). William W. Holden: North Carolina's Political Enigma. Chapel Hill: University of North Carolina Press. ISBN 0807850608.
