= Red Strings =

American group of unionists and quakers

The Red Strings, also known as the Heroes of America, were a group active primarily in the Southern United States during the American Civil War. They favored peace, an end to the Confederacy, and a restoration of the Union. They began early in the war as a group of Unionists and Quakers in the Piedmont regions of North Carolina and Virginia, where slavery was not as prevalent and the forces favoring secession were weakest.

== Origin ==
The origins of the Heroes of America is unclear. Historians William T. Auman and David D. Scarboro speculated that it emerged as early as 1861. They note a deposition taken before the Southern Claims Commission in 1873 in which a North Carolina man claimed his brother in Guilford County joined the Heroes in 1861.

As secession grew imminent, there was much dissent in central North Carolina. As early as 1861, Governor Henry Toole Clark sent state troops into Davidson County to arrest and subdue a militant group of Unionists led by John Hilton.

In January 1862, an area of central NC nicknamed the Quaker Belt was the subject of a letter printed in the Richmond Examiner. The article, titled, "The Demand for Vigilance," claimed a secret organization had been formed amongst men disloyal to the Confederacy.

In early March of 1862, two "peace meetings" were held in Davidson and Randolph County, North Carolina in opposition to the confederate draft. Future North Carolina Governor Jonathan Worth, a Randolph County native, and other confederate officials were aware of these pro Union gatherings.

With civilian war weariness increasing in parts of the Confederacy during 1863, pro-Union activities began to become organized as a resistance. The Loyal Order of the Heroes of America was started by several men from North Carolina, possibly including Henderson Adams, later the first elected State Auditor. The group's leader was John Pool, later a Republican Senator from North Carolina, who spent some time in jail in Richmond, and who traveled through western Virginia in 1864.

The group's name, "Red Strings", comes from their using red strings worn on their lapels or hung outside of their windows to identify themselves. This symbol comes from the Biblical story of the harlot Rahab, who had helped two spies of Israel escape from Jericho with a red cord, and was advised by them to hang a red thread on her window as a recognition symbol and to show her faith. "..[T]hou shalt bind this line of scarlet in the window which thou didst let us down by... ...and she bound the scarlet line in the window... ...And Joshua saved Rahab the harlot alive, and her father's household, and all that she had. And she dwellest in Israel even unto this day; because she hid the messengers that Joshua sent to spy out Jericho."

The organization was completely decentralized, and most knew only one other member for certain; most of their anti-Confederate activities were carried out in secret. Some estimate that by the war's end, as many as 10,000 people belonged to the Red Strings. They were comparably as disruptive to the Southern war effort as the Copperheads were to the Union.

== Activities ==
According to the Historial Times Encyclopedia of the Civil War:

The best developed of the peace societies, the Order of the Heroes of America, may have been organized as early as Dec. 1861, though by whom and where is uncertain. Active in North Carolina, southwestern Virginia, and eastern Tennessee, the Heroes protected deserters, aided spies and escaped prisoners, and supplied Federal authorities with information about Confederate troop movements and strength to bring about a Confederate defeat. Brig. Gen. John Echols, who investigated the order in Virginia when it was discovered there in 1864, believed it had been formed at the suggestion of Federal authorities. Union civilian and military officials cooperated with the order by assuring its members safe passage through the lines and by offering them exemption from military service if they deserted, protection for their property, and a share of confiscated Confederate estates after the war. In addition to their signs and passwords, the Heroes identified themselves by wearing a red string on their lapels and thus were nicknamed the Red Strings" and the 'Red-String Band.'"

The Order of the Heroes of America extended into southwestern Virginia as well. Paint Bank, Virginia was known as a Union-Hole because of the pro-Union membership in these societies. One of the members of the Order was a Christiansburg, Virginia wheelwright named Williams. It is not known if this is the same man named Williams that residents of Back Valley, Virginia spoke about as a member of the Loyal League.

The Red Strings did not actively fight the Confederacy as guerillas, and many of their members may have been motivated by opposition to conscription as much as, or more than, by their belief in the Union. Some members joined as the result of mistreatment by Confederate officials or Home Guard units.

In addition to the organized opposition groups such as the Red Strings and Heroes of America, there were other groups that were closer to bandits. Known as "Buffaloes," these men and some women were a mixture of Confederate deserters, draft-dodgers, pro-Union men, escaped slaves and other men escaping the noose such as arsonists, rapists and murderers. Living in small groups in the swamps of eastern North Carolina or the woods of the central and western parts of that state, they attacked isolated homes, often with impunity, since many of the men were away at war, and there was no protection from their lawlessness.

The correspondents in the war records seem unaware that North Carolina, like all Gaul, was divided into three parts- the Confederate, the Yankee and the Buffalo. It was easier to let the Yankee garrison the strip of coast and keep him there than have the expense of it ourselves, but it is amusing to read of "The Rebels Invading North Carolina".

The "Red Strings" were also interested in forming blacks into soldiers and having them fight for the Union as well. There are miscellaneous accounts of these black companies being formed during the war, as is mentioned in Elizabeth Lee Battle's autobiography, Forget-Me-Nots of the Civil War.

After the war, the Red Strings continued to organize for the protection of its members and supported the election of Unionists to public office. It actively opposed the Ku Klux Klan.

== Red Strings Baseball Team ==
The term "Red Strings" became popular among different groups after the war. Indeed, during the next generation, there was an exceptional baseball team formed in Yadkin County with the name, "Red Strings." They only lost three games out of some sixty games that they played in their brief career. Many of the players were trained in Quaker schools, although they denied any relation to the "Red Strings" of the Civil War. According to Macon Rush Dunnagan:

How the name Red Strings originated is not known definitely. Members think Captain Gus Long, organizer and manager, gave the name… Elkin-ites didn't like the name Red Strings- too much like night riding political group about this time, the Red Shirts, reminiscent of the earlier Ku Klux Klan. They preferred to call them the Longtown boys.

== Earlier red string conspiracy ==
It is unknown if an earlier Southern conspiracy with a similar name, also organized by slaves and indentured servants, that took place in Georgia in the 18th century had any influence or association with the later Red Strings. In 1735 and 1736, a conspiracy among indentured servants was quashed in Savannah, Georgia and in South Carolina. The servants would be known "by a red string tied around their right wrist" and they would kill the white masters and escape to join Native Americans, escaped slaves and other runaway indentured servants.

== See also ==
- Arkansas Peace Society
