= Confederation (disambiguation) =

A confederation or confederacy is a union of sovereign groups or states united for purposes of common action.

Confederation may also refer to:

- Confederation (Poland–Lithuania), an ad hoc association in Poland and Lithuania between the 13th and 19th centuries
- Confederation Liberty and Independence, or simply Confederation, is a far-right political alliance in Poland
- List of confederations
- Another name for a shill, especially in magic tricks

== See also ==
- Confed (disambiguation)
- Federation, a political entity characterized by a union of partially self-governing regions
- Articles of Confederation, an agreement among the 13 original United States of America that served as its first constitution
- Confederate States of America, a breakaway state that fought against the United States of America during the American Civil War
- Central Confederacy, a proposed country formed by the Upper South based around Appalachia
