= 1860 North Carolina gubernatorial election =

- August 2, 1860
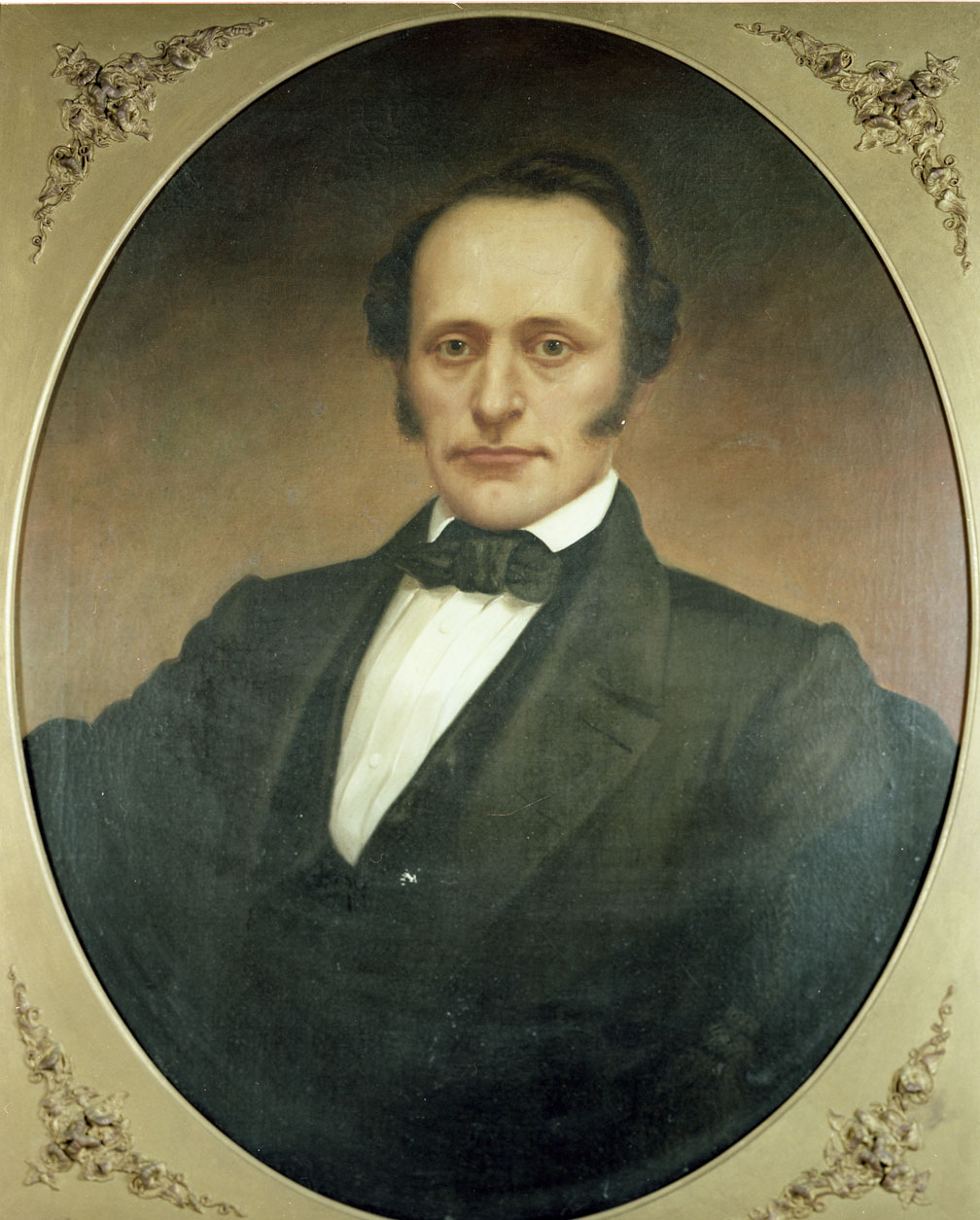

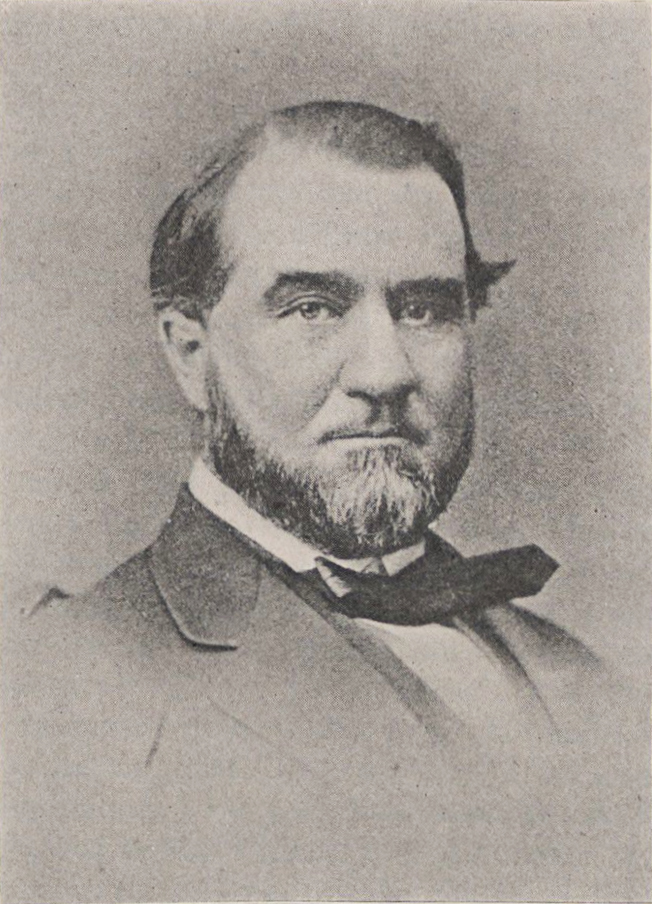
Nominee	John Willis Ellis	John Pool
Party	Democratic	Whig
Popular vote	59,396	53,303
Percentage	52.70%	47.30%
- County results Ellis: 50–60% 60–70% 70–80% 80–90% Pool: 50–60% 60–70% 70–80% 80–90% 90–100%
Governor before election
John Willis Ellis
Democratic
Elected Governor
John Willis Ellis
Democratic

The 1860 North Carolina gubernatorial election was held on August 2, 1860, in order to elect the governor of North Carolina. Incumbent Democratic governor John Willis Ellis won re-election against Whig nominee and former member of the North Carolina Senate John Pool.

== General election ==
On election day, August 2, 1860, incumbent Democratic governor John Willis Ellis won re-election by a margin of 6,093 votes against his opponent Whig nominee John Pool, thereby retaining Democratic control over the office of governor. Ellis was sworn in for his second term on January 1, 1861.

=== Results ===
North Carolina gubernatorial election, 1860
Party	Candidate	Votes	%
Democratic	John Willis Ellis (incumbent)	59,396	52.70
Whig	John Pool	53,303	47.30
Total votes		112,699	100.00
Democratic hold			
