= 1862 North Carolina gubernatorial election =

- August 7, 1862
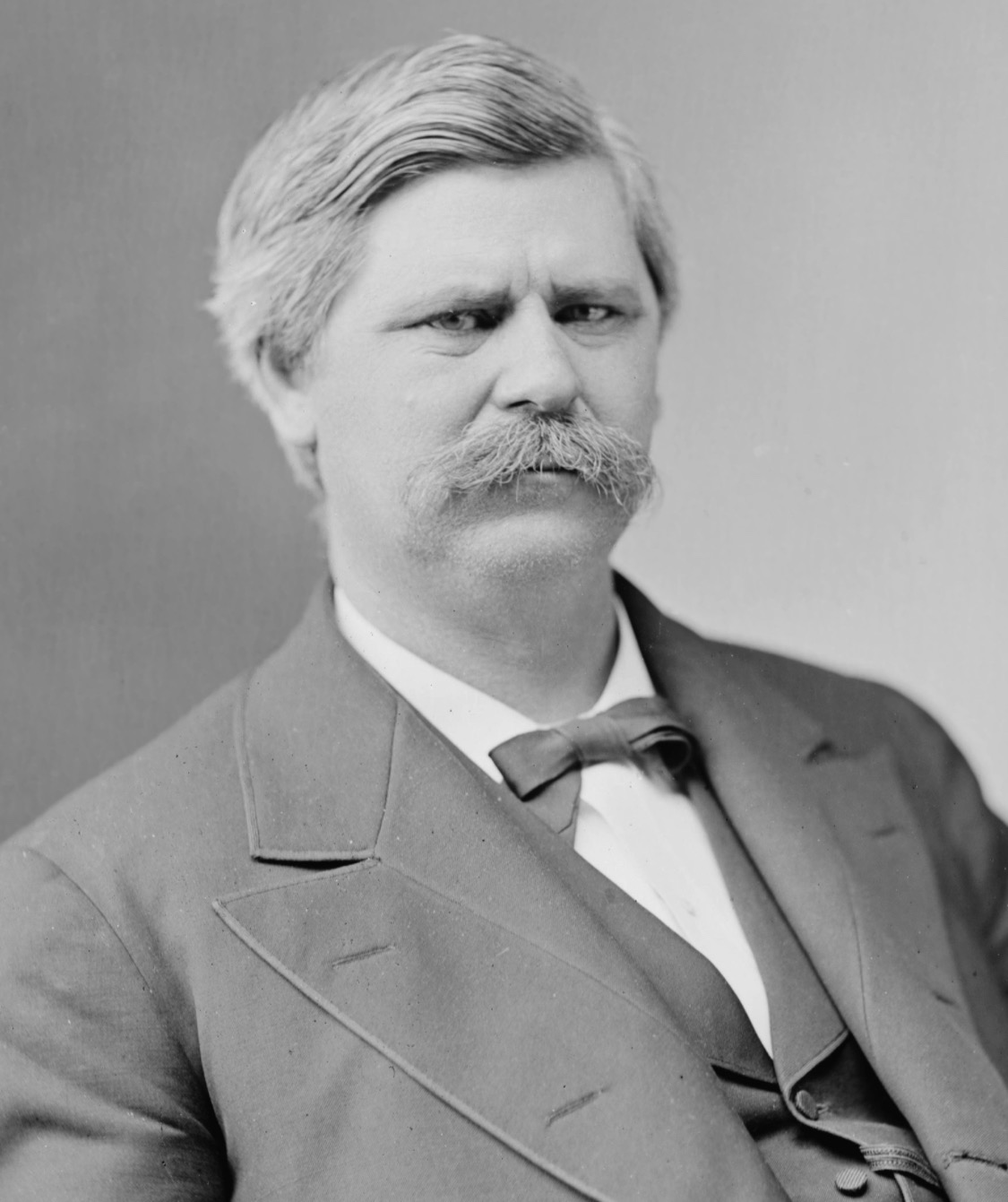

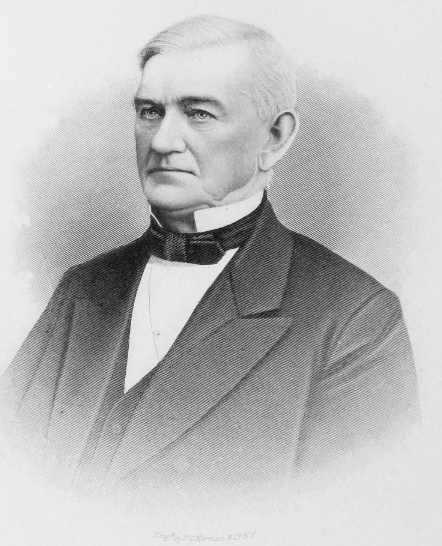
Nominee	Zebulon Vance	William J. Johnston
Party	Nonpartisan	Nonpartisan
Popular vote	55,282	20,813
Percentage	72.65%	27.35%
- County results Vance: 50–60% 60–70% 70–80% 80–90% >90% Johnston: 50–60% 60–70% 70–80% 80–90% >90% No returns
Governor before election
Henry Toole Clark (Acting)
Democratic
Elected Governor
Zebulon Vance

The 1862 North Carolina gubernatorial election was held on August 7, 1862, in order to elect the Governor of North Carolina. This was the first election held following North Carolina's secession from the Union and joining the Confederate States of America on May 20, 1861.

== Candidates ==
The incumbent, Henry Toole Clark had been elevated to the governor's office in July 1861 following the unexpected death of his predecessor John Willis Ellis. Facing discontent with the military situation, Clark chose not to run for reelection.

Zebulon Vance, a former member of the U.S. House of Representatives from North Carolina's 8th district and colonel of the 26th North Carolina Infantry Regiment ran on a conservative ticket.

Vance's opponent was William J. Johnston, a railroad executive from Mecklenburg County supported by members of the Democratic Party.

== General election ==
On election day, August 7, 1862, Zebulon Vance won the election by a margin of 34,469 votes against his opponent William J. Johnston, thereby gaining the office of Governor. Vance was sworn in as the 37th Governor of North Carolina on September 8, 1862.

=== Results ===
North Carolina gubernatorial election, 1862
Party	Candidate	Votes	%
Nonpartisan	Zebulon Vance	55,282	72.65
Nonpartisan	William J. Johnston	20,813	27.35
Total votes		76,095	100.00
