= William P. Bynum =

American judge and politician (1820–1909)

Associate justice of the North Carolina Supreme Court
- In office November 21, 1873 – January 6, 1879

Member of the North Carolina Senate
- In office 1866 – 1868 ?

Representative of Lincoln County to the North Carolina Constitutional Convention
- In office November 1865 – November 1865

Solicitor for North Carolina's 7th Judicial District
- In office December 2, 1862 – November 21, 1873

Personal details
- Born: William Preston Bynum; June 10, 1820 Stokes County, North Carolina, U.S.
- Died: December 30, 1909 (aged 89) Charlotte, North Carolina, U.S.
- Party: Republican
- Education: Davidson College
- Profession: Attorney and state solicitor

William Preston Bynum (June 10, 1820 – December 30, 1909) was an American lawyer, judge, politician, and military officer. He served as an associate justice of the North Carolina Supreme Court from 1873 to 1879. Bynum also served one term in the North Carolina Senate and participated in the 1865 North Carolina Constitutional Convention. Although he was against secession, he served as a colonel for the Confederate States Army during the American Civil War.

== Early life ==
Bynum was born on June 10, 1820 at his family's plantation in Stokes County, North Carolina. He was the third of the five sons and three daughters of Mary Coleman (née Hampton) and Hampton Bynum, who owned a plantation located one mile south of Germanton, North Carolina. His maternal grandfather was John Martin, a colonel in the American Revolution, a member of the Georgia House of Representatives, and Governor of Georgia.

Bynum's early education was in a log cabin school near Germanton and at common schools. He enrolled in Davidson College when it opened in 1837 and graduated in 1843 with first honors. He then studied law under Richmond Mumford Pearson, later chief justice of the North Carolina Supreme Court, at his home in Asheville, North Carolina. He was admitted to the bar in Rutherfordton, North Carolina.

== Career ==
=== Legal career and military service ===
Bynum started a law practice in Rutherfordton, North Carolina. Later, he moved his practice to Lincolnton, North Carolina, continuing there until the outbreak of the American Civil War.

Politically, he was a member of the Whig Party and was against North Carolina's secession from the United States. However, he ultimately decided to side with the Confederate States of America. Bynum was commissioned by governor John Willis Ellis to the 2nd Regiment, North Carolina Infantry as a lieutenant colonel on May 8, 1961. In this capacity, he fought in the Battle of Beaver Dam Creek, the Battle of Cold Harbor, Battle of Malvern Hill, and the Battle of Antietam. After his commanding officer was killed at Antietam, Bynum was promoted to colonel on October 29, 1862, by Governor Zebulon Vance.

While Bynum's regiment was wintering on the Potomac River in Virginia, the North Carolina Legislature elected him to the position of state solicitor for Western North Carolina's Seventh Judicial District on December 2, 1862. Bynum resigned his military commission on March 21, 186,3 to accept the position, which he retained for eleven years through a combination of election and appointment. One of the issues he faced while in office was dissenters of the Confederate Conscription Acts.

=== Politics ===
Bynum was elected to represent Lincoln County, North Carolina at the North Carolina Constitutional Convention in November 1865. At the convention, he made a speech in support of equalizing the representation for the eastern and western parts of the state, resulting in some of his amendments being adopted.

In the 1866 election, Bynum was elected to the North Carolina Senate as a Republican, representing Lincolon County, Gaston County, and Catawba County. While serving, he promoted the 1868 Constitution of North Carolina. In 1871, he successfully advocated to retain this version on the consititution, rather than convening another state convention. Polically, Bynum was associated with Governor Tod Robinson Caldwell and the state's other leading Rebublicans.

=== Judicial service ===
In 1873, Governor Caldwell appointed Bynum to fill a vacancy as an associate justice of the North Carolina Supreme Court. His former mentor, Richmond Mumford Pearson, was the court's chief justice at the time. Bynum resigned his position of solicitor on November 20, 1873. Bynum joined the Supreme Court in the difficult period following the Civil War. William S. Pearson wrote, "There is a clearness and precision in his written opinions that make them models, and they are marked by an absence of any attempt to display learning by unnecessary discussion in stating the conclusions of the court." Byrum wrote 346 opnions. Some of his notable opinions, found in volumes 70 through 77 of the North Carolina Reports, include Wittkowsky v. Wasson, State v. Dixon, Manning v. Manning, Brown v. Turner, and Belo v. the Commissioners. One of his notable dissenting opinions was in State v. R. and D. Railroad Co.

Bynum served on the court from November 21, 1873 until the expiration of the term on January 6, 1879. An 1875 constitutional convention amended the state constitution to reduce the Supreme Court from four to two associate justices, with the reduction taking effect after the terms of the incumbent justices expired; as a result, the seats occupied by Bynum and William B. Rodman were set to be eliminated following the 1878 election. Bynam declined to run for re-election in 1878, and had no successor in his seat. The 1878 election changed the court's composition to Democrat.

=== Later career ===
In 1878, Bynum returned to private practice in Charlotte, North Carolina, with his nephew, William P. Bynum Jr., and one of his wife's brothers. He turned down many offers to return to public life, including a nomination for governor in July 1884. He continued practicing law into his eighties, when he retired.

== Honors ==
Davidson College awarded Bynum an honorary LL.D. His portrait is displayed at the North Carolina Supreme Court Building.

== Personal life ==
Bynum married Ann Eliza Shipp on December 2, 1846 in Rutherford County. She was his cousin, the daughter of Bartlett Shipp, and the sister of judge William Marcus Shipp, North Carolina Attorney General and a member of the North Carolina Senate. After getting married, they moved from Rutherfordton, North Carolina to Lincolnton, North Carolina. They had two children: Rev. William Shipp Bynum and Mary Preston Bynum.

Around 1878, the Bynums moved to a house on 415 West Trade Street in Charlotte, North Carolina. In his personal time in Charlotte, Bynum enjoyed flower gardening and reading literature from his library. His wife died on June 4, 1885, after a long period as an invalid.

Bynum was a philanthropist who supported the Germanton Epsicopal Church and paid for a chapel for the Thompson Orphanage in Charlotte in honor of his daughter, and a chapel at the State Normal and Industrial College in Greensboro, North Carolina. In 1903, he donated a gymnasium to the University of North Carolina at Chapel Hill, Bynum Hall, in memory of his grandson, William Preston Bynum Jr., who died during his sophomore year at the university.

In June 1909, Bynum had a stroke and suffered from paralysis. He never recovered. Bynam died on December 30, 1909, at his home in Charlotte, North Carolina, at the age of 89 years. His funeral was held at St. Peter's Epscopal Church in Charlotte. In his will, Bynum requested that the children from the Thompson Orphanage attend his funeral as a group, providing for a $2 per boy payment for their time. The Charlotte Bar Association, the Guilford Bar Association, and Mecklenburg County Bar all held special sessions and passed resolutions in tribute to Bynum.

Both of Bynum's children predeceased him, and his daughter never married, making his daughter-in-law and five grandchildren heirs of an estate worth up to $250,000. He left a bequest of an estimated $300,000 to the University of North Carolina at Chapel Hill. He also left bequests to the Thompson Orphanage, the Episcopal Diocese of North Carolina, St. Peter's Episcopal Church, St. Peter's Hospital, Good Samaritan Hospital, the Church of the Holy Comforter, the Philanthropic Society of Davidson College, and the Germanton Episcopal Church.

Political offices
Preceded by Nathaniel Boyden	Justice of the North Carolina Supreme Court; 1873–1878	Succeeded by Seat eliminated
