= Quaker Meadows =

Historic house in North Carolina, United States

- U.S. National Register of Historic Places
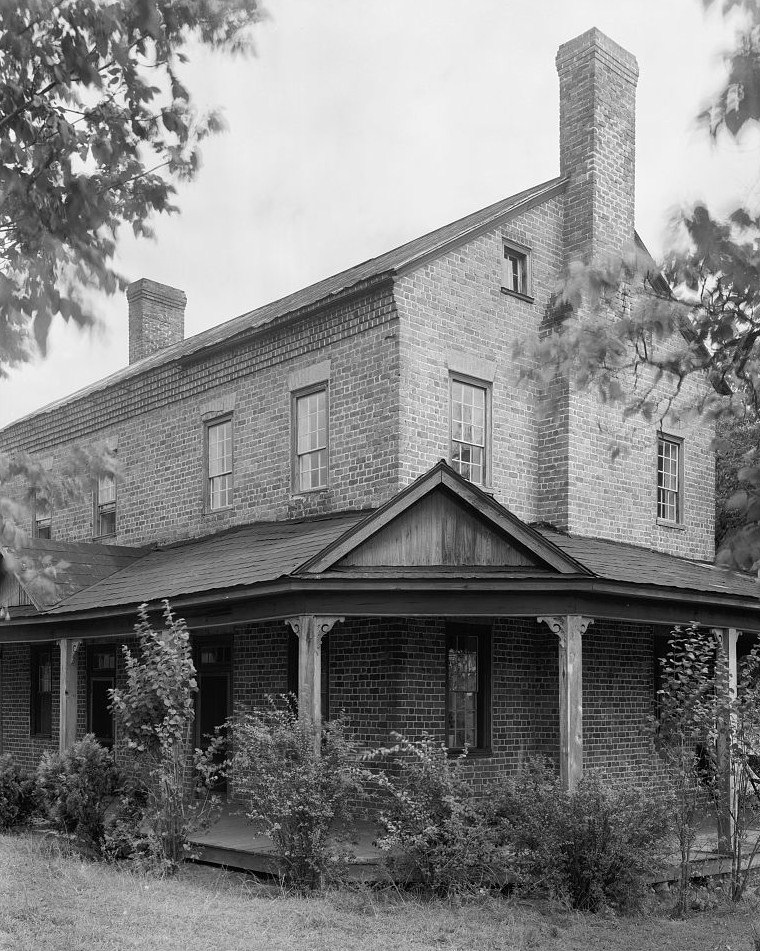
- Quaker Meadows (1938)

- Location within North Carolina Location within the United States
- Location: W of Morganton off NC 181, near Morganton, North Carolina
- Coordinates: 35°45′26″N 81°43′15″W
- Area: 9 acres (3.6 ha)
- Built: 1812
- Architectural style: Federal
- NRHP reference No.: 73001298
- Added to NRHP: October 3, 1973

Quaker Meadows, also known as the McDowell House at Quaker Meadows, is a historic plantation house located near Morganton, Burke County, North Carolina. It was built about 1812, and is a two-story, four bay by two bay, Quaker plan brick structure in the Federal style. It features two one-story shed porches supported by square pillars ornamented by scroll sawn brackets. The Quaker Meadows plantation was the home of Revolutionary War figure, Col. Charles McDowell. It was at Quaker Meadows that Zebulon Baird Vance (later American Civil War governor) married Charles McDowell's niece, Harriet N. Espy.

It was listed on the National Register of Historic Places in 1973.

The house is owned by the Historic Burke Foundation and has been restored to an 1812 appearance. It is open for tours and available for rent.

The owner of the plantation was Joseph McDowell Jr. (1758–1801), who was nicknamed Joseph "Quaker Meadows" McDowell to distinguish him from his cousin Joseph "Pleasant Gardens" McDowell (1756–1795). Since Joseph Quaker Meadows McDowell, Jr. died in 1801, the original plantation must have been built during his lifetime.
