= Harriett Newell Espy Vance =

First Lady of North Carolina (1832–1878)

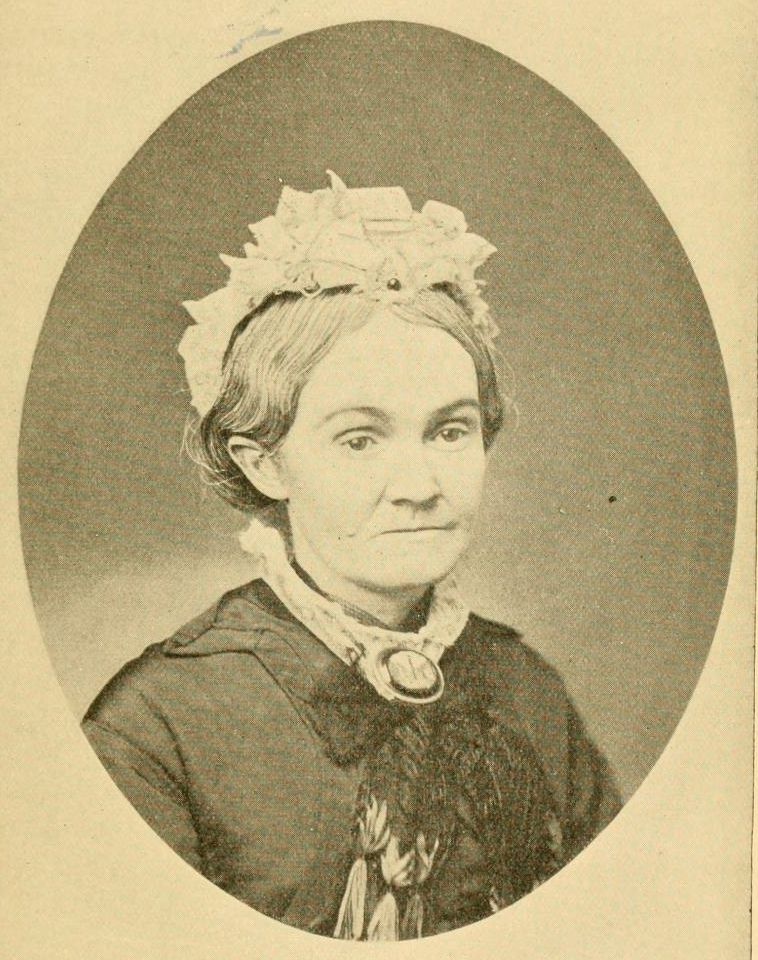

First Lady of North Carolina
- Assumed role January 1, 1877 – November 3, 1878
- Governor: Zebulon Vance
- Preceded by: office vacant
- Succeeded by: Mary Woodson Jarvis

First Lady of North Carolina
- Assumed role September 8, 1862 – May 29, 1865
- Governor: Zebulon Vance
- Preceded by: Mary Weeks Hargrave Clark
- Succeeded by: office vacant

Personal details
- Born: Harriett Newell Espy; 1832
- Died: November 3, 1878 (aged 45–46)
- Resting place: Riverside Cemetery
- Party: Democratic
- Spouse: Zebulon Vance
- Children: 5

Harriett Newell Espy Vance (1832–1878) was an American heiress and letter writer who twice served as the first lady of North Carolina. She was first lady during the American Civil War, when North Carolina seceded from the United States and joined the Confederate States of America. Vance was the last first lady to reside in the Governor's Palace in Raleigh, North Carolina.

== Biography ==
Vance was born in 1832 and was orphaned. Her father, Rev. Robert Espy, had been a Presbyterian minister. She was raised by her uncle, Brigadier General Charles McDowell, at Quaker Meadows, his plantation in Burke County, North Carolina.

On August 3, 1853, she married the lawyer Zebulon Baird Vance at Quaker Meadows. Their two-year courtship, which started in 1851, consisted almost entirely of writing love letters, as the two lived far away from one another. She continued to write extensively to her husband and other relatives throughout her adult life.

She and her husband had five sons: Robert Espy Vance (born 1854, died young), Charles Noel Vance (born 1856), David Mitchell Vance (born 1857), Zebulon Baird Vance Jr. (born 1860), and Thomas Malvern Vance (born 1862).

The Vance family lived on a 5-acre lot in Asheville. Their home, at the cost of $2,300, was purchased using Vance's dowry. They enslaved six people here: Isaac, Julia, Hannah, Marion, and two unnamed children, all of whom cleaned the house, tended the garden, did the laundry, and helped raise the Vance children.

Her husband served as Governor of North Carolina under the Confederacy during the American Civil War, making her the first lady. She was the last first lady to reside in the Governor's Palace in Raleigh before it was seized by General William Tecumseh Sherman. During the war, she stayed in Statesville with her children. Her husband was arrested by the Union Army and taken under guard to Washington, D.C., leaving her to raise the children alone. During this time, her health declined from extreme stress and she suffered a hemorrhage in her lung. Her husband was granted parole by President Andrew Johnson, who was sympathetic to her illness.

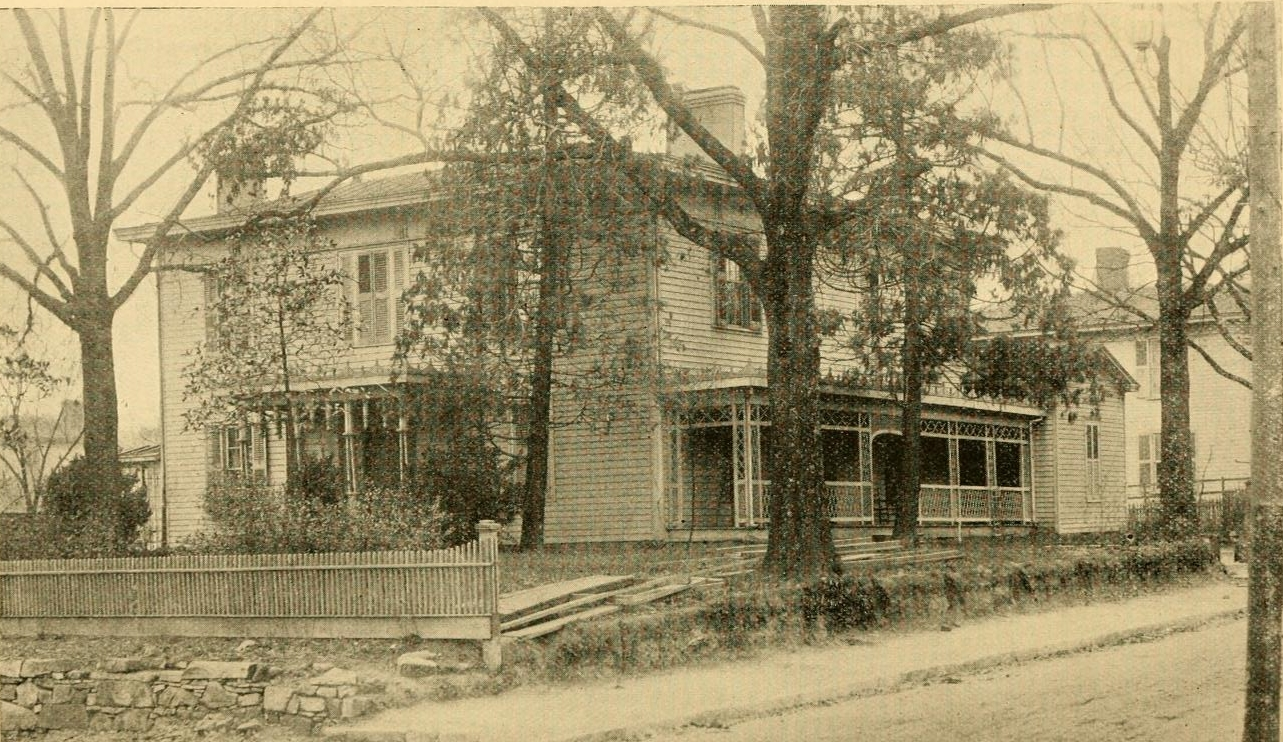
The Vance family home in Charlotte

In the late 1860s, the family moved to Charlotte.

In October 1878, the Vance family moved into a house, formerly the home of Kemp P. Battle, on Fayetteville Street in Raleigh.

Vance was a member of the Presbyterian Church and convinced her husband to officially join the church when he was forty-eight years old.

She died on November 3, 1878, after suffering from an illness. Her remains were taken by train to Asheville, where she was buried in Riverside Cemetery.
