= Confed =

Confed may refer to:

- Confederation of Shipbuilding and Engineering Unions, a trade union federation in the United Kingdom
- FIFA Confederations Cup, soccer tournament

== See also ==
- Confederation (disambiguation)
