= Mary McKinley Daves Ellis =

First Lady of North Carolina (1859–1861)

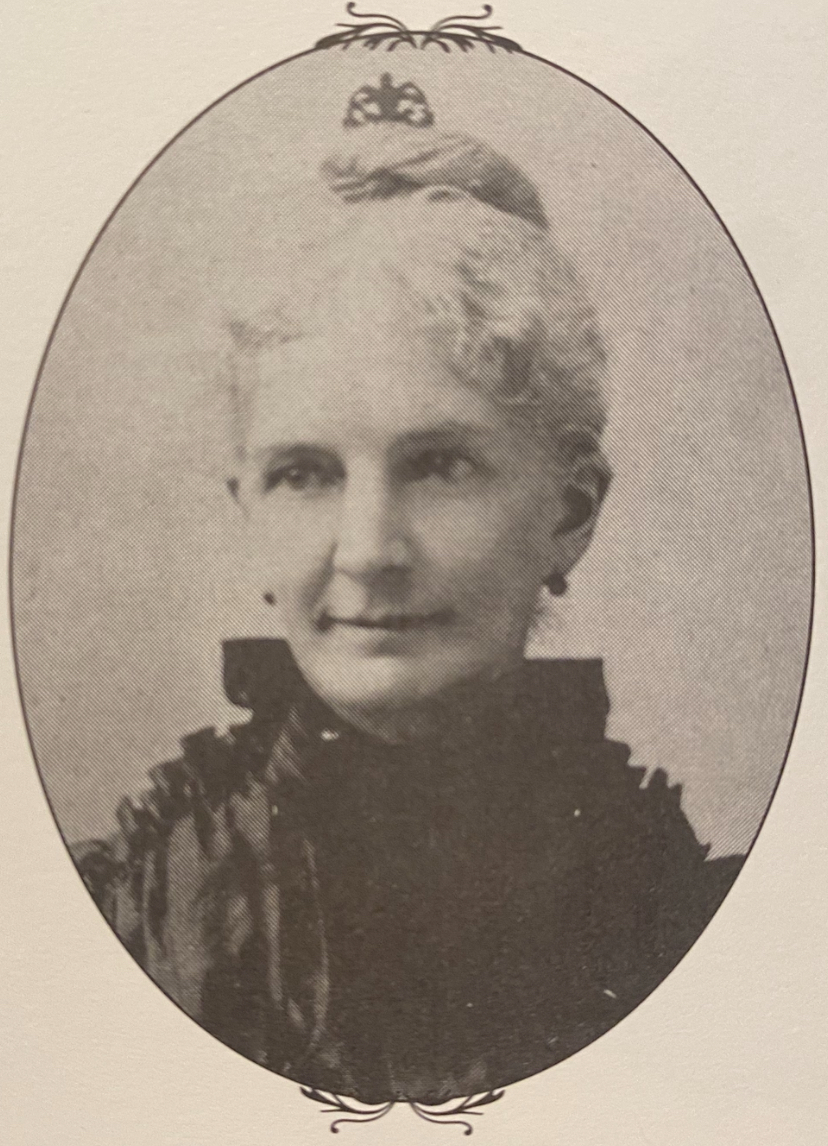

First Lady of North Carolina
- In office January 1, 1859 – July 7, 1861
- Governor: John Willis Ellis
- Preceded by: Isabell Cathbert Bragg
- Succeeded by: Mary Weeks Parker Hargrave Clark

Personal details
- Born: Mary McKinley Daves; January 2, 1835 New Bern, North Carolina, U.S.
- Died: January 23, 1916 (aged 81) Pensacola, Florida, U.S.
- Spouse(s): John Willis Ellis (m. 1858); Haines E. Nash
- Children: 2

Mary McKinley Daves Ellis Nash (January 2, 1835 – January 23, 1916) was an American political hostess who, as the wife of Governor John Willis Ellis, served as First Lady of North Carolina from 1859 to 1861. She was first lady when North Carolina seceded from the Union and joined the Confederate States of America during the American Civil War.

== Biography ==
Ellis was born Mary McKinley Daves on 2 January 1835 in New Bern, North Carolina to John P. Daves and Elizabeth Batchelor Graham.

On 11 August 1858, she married the widower John Willis Ellis, who six days earlier was elected governor of North Carolina. They had at least two daughters, Mary Daves and Jean Graham. Ellis served as the First Lady of North Carolina during her husband's term as governor, from 1859 to 1861. During the American Civil War, within her husband's term, North Carolina seceded from the Union and joined the Confederate States of America. Her husband died in office. Upon her husband's death, his successor John Willis Ellis, declined to move into the Governor's Palace in Raleigh so that she could stay there to grieve.

Ellis was a member of the Daughters of the American Revolution and served as state regent of North Carolina's DAR from 1892 to 1895. She was also first vice president of the Ladies' Memorial Association of New Bern.

She died on January 23, 1916 in Pensacola, Florida.

== Works cited ==
- Poteat, R. Matthew (January 2007). "Part 1: "A Modest Estimate of His Own Abilities": Governor Henry Toole Clark and the Early Civil War Leadership of North Carolina". The North Carolina Historical Review. 84 (1): 1–36. JSTOR 23523278.
