= Henderson Adams =

American politician

Henderson Adams was an American politician. He was a state senator who also served as Auditor of North Carolina from 1868 until 1873. Serving during the Reconstruction era, he was a Republican.

He was a peace and convention advocate who was also reputed to have been a possible founder of the Heroes of America group.

An act of the U.S. Congress relieved Adams of "disabilities" resulting from his role in serving the Confederacy during the American Civil War. He was elected to the state senate from Davidson County, North Carolina, in 1862.

Party political offices
First	Republican nominee for North Carolina State Auditor; 1868	Succeeded by John Reilly
