= William B. Rodman =

American judge

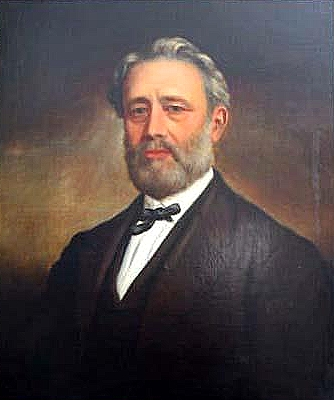
Portrait of William Blount Rodman, by William George Randall, 1895

William Blount Rodman (1817, in Washington, Beaufort County, North Carolina – 1893) was an American lawyer and politician from North Carolina. He was a justice of the North Carolina Supreme Court from 1868 to 1878.

== Life ==
He was the son of William Wanton Rodman (d. ca. 1825, brother of John Rodman) and Polly Anne (Blount) Rodman.

Rodman graduated from the University of North Carolina at Chapel Hill in 1836 and studied law under Judge William Gaston. He was admitted to the bar in 1838. He delivered an address to the Wake Forest literary societies in 1846. He helped revise the state's legal code in 1854, along with Bartholomew F. Moore.

In 1858, he married Camilla Croom, and they had eight children.

He served as a Democratic elector for John C. Breckinridge in 1860 and as a Confederate elector for Jefferson Davis in 1861. During the American Civil War, he commanded Confederate troops and served as a military judge for the Army of Northern Virginia.

After the war he resumed the practice of law in Washington, North Carolina, and, though politically Independent, he supported the Republican Party. He took a leading role at the 1868 state constitutional convention, where he served as chairman of the judiciary committee and unsuccessfully argued that judges should not be elected by the people. Nevertheless, later that same year, Rodman was elected to the Supreme Court. An 1875 constitutional convention having amended the state constitution to reduce the Supreme Court from four associate justices to two, with the reduction taking effect after the terms of the incumbent justices expired, the seats occupied by Rodman and William P. Bynum were eliminated following the 1878 election.

His grandson William B. Rodman III, usually called William B. Rodman Jr., was also a state Supreme Court justice. The portraits of both justices hang in the Supreme Court chambers.
