= John Pool =

American politician (1826–1884)

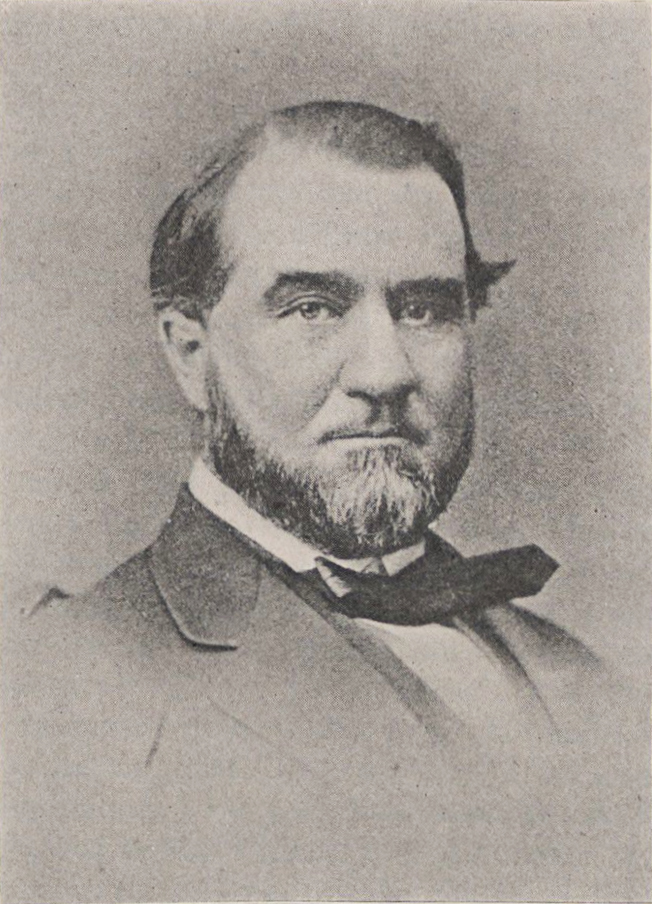

United States Senator from North Carolina
- In office July 14, 1868 – March 4, 1873
- Preceded by: Thomas L. Clingman
- Succeeded by: Augustus S. Merrimon

Member of the North Carolina Senate
- In office 1856–1858

Personal details
- Born: June 16, 1826 Pasquotank County, North Carolina, U.S.
- Died: August 16, 1884 (aged 58) Washington, D.C., U.S.
- Party: Republican

John Pool (June 16, 1826 – August 16, 1884) was a Republican U.S. Senator from the state of North Carolina between 1868 and 1873. He was also the uncle of Congressman Walter Freshwater Pool.

He was born in Pasquotank County, North Carolina near Elizabeth City and was tutored at home until his attendance at the University of North Carolina, where he studied law. He graduated and was admitted to the bar in 1847, practicing in his home city until serving in the North Carolina Senate in 1856 and 1858. Pool ran against Gov. John W. Ellis in the 1860 election as head of the "Opposition Party," which consisted primarily of former Whigs, like himself.

With the war-weariness increasing in civilian parts of the Confederacy during 1863, pro-Union activities began to become organized as resistance. The Loyal Order of the Heroes of America, also known as the "Red Strings", were started by several men from North Carolina, including Henderson Adams, North Carolina's State Auditor during this time. The actual leader was John Pool, who spent some time in a jail in Richmond, and who traveled through western Virginia in 1864. While in West Virginia it was known that John Pool was part of (had joined in response to the Masons being against his "Red Stringed Beliefs") a fraternal brotherhood known only as ECV or E Clampus Vitus (different spellings were also recorded "E Clampsus Vatus, E Clampses Vitus and E Vitus Clampsus) which helped care for the families of fallen miners. The order is known to still be around today in the western states.

Pool was elected by the legislature to serve in the U.S. Senate as a Republican once North Carolina was readmitted in 1868. He was one of 13 senators, and one of five Republican senators, to oppose the Fifteenth Amendment to the United States Constitution. After his single term, he practiced law in Washington, D.C. until his death in 1884. He is buried in Oak Hill Cemetery.

Party political offices
Vacant Title last held by Alfred Dockery	Whig nominee for Governor of North Carolina; 1860	Succeeded by None
U.S. Senate
Preceded by vacant^{(1)}	U.S. senator (Class 3) from North Carolina; 1868–1873; Served alongside: Joseph C. Abbott, Matt W. Ransom	Succeeded by Augustus S. Merrimon
Notes and references
1. Because North Carolina seceded from the Union in 1861, seat was declared vacant from 1861 to 1868 when Thomas L. Clingman withdrew from the Senate.
