= Central Confederacy =

Proposed nation in North America before the American Civil War

The states in 1861 States of the Union where slavery was banned U.S. territories, under Union Army control States that permitted slavery, but did not secede. KY and MO had dual competing Confederate and Unionist governments States that seceded before April 15, 1861 States that seceded after April 15, 1861

The Central Confederacy was a proposed nation made up of American states in the Upland South prior to the outbreak of the American Civil War in 1861.

== Background ==
In December 1860 and January 1861, seven states in the southern United States declared secession from the US after the 1860 election of Abraham Lincoln, out of fear that he would hurt the institution of slavery. These southern states formed the Confederate States of America.

Some prominent figures from the Border Southern States suggested that the US should allow the southern states to secede peacefully. In the Border South and Upper South states, there were also men who wanted their states to join the Confederacy. Former Congressman John Pendleton Kennedy and Governor Thomas Hicks, both of Maryland, called for a Central Confederacy composed of the states of Virginia, Kentucky, Tennessee, Missouri, North Carolina, and Maryland.

== The plan ==
Kennedy published a pamphlet entitled The Border States on December 15, 1860, that suggested the secession and confederation of six Border States: Virginia, Kentucky, Tennessee, Missouri, North Carolina, and Maryland. Hicks advocated the plan in a January 2, 1861, letter to Delaware Governor William Burton. As the southern Confederacy formed, sentiment among the newspapers and people of Maryland, Delaware, New Jersey, Pennsylvania, and New York were at its highest for the formation of a Central Confederacy. However, this rhetoric reversed following the Confederate attack on Fort Sumter.
