= Henry Toole Clark =

American politician

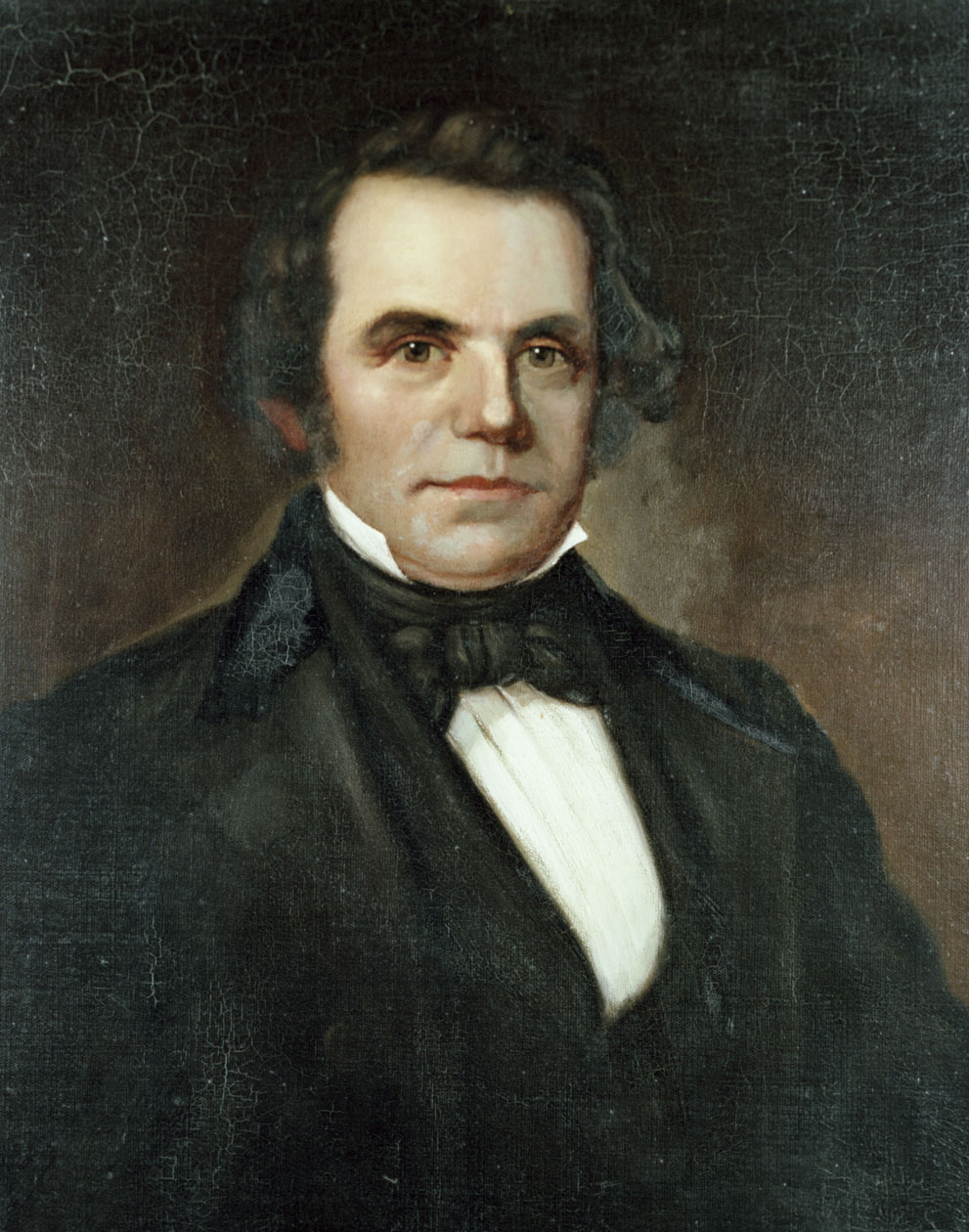

36th Governor of North Carolina
- In office July 7, 1861 – September 8, 1862
- Preceded by: John Willis Ellis
- Succeeded by: Zebulon Baird Vance

Personal details
- Born: Henry Toole Clark; February 7, 1808 Edgecombe County, North Carolina, US
- Died: April 14, 1874 (aged 66) Edgecombe County, North Carolina, US
- Party: Southern Democrats
- Spouse: Mary Weeks Hargrave
- Children: 5
- Relatives: William Gordon (great-grandson)
- Education: University of North Carolina at Chapel Hill
- Profession: Planter, politician

Henry Toole Clark (February 7, 1808 – April 14, 1874) was the 36th Governor of the U.S. state of North Carolina from 1861 to 1862 during the American Civil War. Elevated to the governor's office following the unexpected death of his predecessor John Willis Ellis, Clark oversaw North Carolina's military efforts in the face of hardships brought on by war, and chose not to run for reelection, stepping down from office in September 1862.

== Early life ==
Henry T. Clark was born to a prominent Edgecombe County, North Carolina, planter family. His father, James West Clark, served as a US Congressman and later as a Navy Department official in the Andrew Jackson administration. The Clarks were members of that elite planter class that dominated social and political thought in eastern North Carolina. Henry Clark devoted over twenty years to the service of the Democratic Party at the local, state, and national levels, and over ten years as a state senator.

Clark attended The University of North Carolina at Chapel Hill where he was a member of the Dialectic Society. He graduated with honors in 1826 and later earned an A. M. in 1832. He joined the bar a year later, though he rarely practiced. He spent most of his time managing the family's extensive land and slave holdings in North Carolina, Alabama, and Tennessee. The Clarks owned as many as sixty-two slaves, many of whom were hired out to others for their labor.

== Political career ==
In 1850 Clark was elected to the state senate, and became speaker in 1858. When state governor John W. Ellis died in office, the office of lieutenant governor did not exist, so Clark as senate speaker succeeded him. Clark served as the state's chief executive from July 1861 to September 1862, a crucial period in which North Carolina established itself as a constituent member of the Confederate States and suffered the hardships of war.

North Carolina had previously relied on Northern states and Great Britain for virtually all its manufactured goods, so much of Clark's energy was focused on obtaining arms, ammunition, and clothing for North Carolina's soldiers. As the leader of the state, he mobilized thousands of soldiers for the Confederate Army, established the only Confederate prison in North Carolina, arranged the production of salt for the war effort, created European purchasing connections, and built a successful and important gunpowder mill. The conservative Clark, however, found more success as an administrator than as a political figure.

Clark was criticized when Union forces captured the crucial coastal defenses of Hatteras Inlet in August, but as governor he had no control over the disposition of North Carolina's Confederate troops, most of whom had been sent to Virginia. In February 1862, Federal troops led by General Ambrose Burnside landed on the North Carolina coast, capturing strategic points but not moving much further inland.

Facing discontent with the military situation, Clark chose not run in the August 1862 gubernatorial election, stepping down from office and serving in the state senate again after the war. Clark died at his home near Tarboro, North Carolina in 1874.

Political offices
Preceded by William Waightstill Avery	Speaker of the North Carolina Senate; 1858–1861	Succeeded by Giles Mebane
Preceded by John W. Ellis	Governor of North Carolina; 1861–1862	Succeeded by Zebulon B. Vance
