= John Willis Ellis =

American politician (1820–1861)

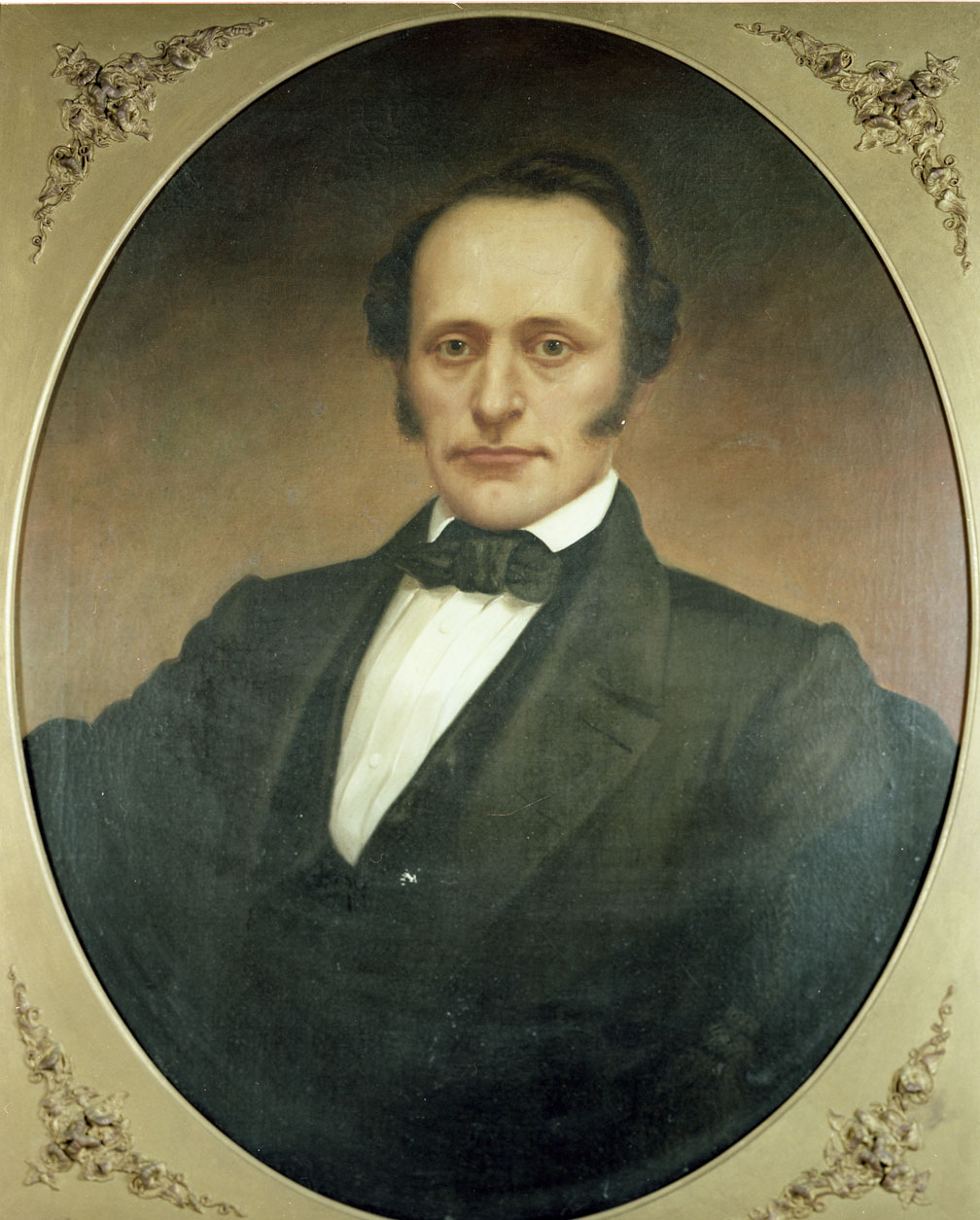

35th Governor of North Carolina
- In office January 1, 1859 – July 7, 1861
- Preceded by: Thomas Bragg
- Succeeded by: Henry Toole Clark

Member of the North Carolina House of Commons

Personal details
- Born: John Willis Ellis; November 23, 1820 Rowan County, North Carolina, US
- Died: July 7, 1861 (aged 40) Red Sulphur Springs, West Virginia (then in Virginia)
- Party: Democratic
- Spouse(s): Mary White (m 1844), Mary McKinley Daves (m 1858)
- Children: 2
- Education: University of North Carolina at Chapel Hill
- Profession: Lawyer, politician

John Willis Ellis (November 23, 1820 – July 7, 1861) was the 35th Governor of the U.S. state of North Carolina from 1859 to 1861. Elected as tensions were rising prior to the American Civil War, Ellis led his state to secede from the Union and join the Confederate States of America in May 1861, but he died shortly afterwards in July of that year from tuberculosis.

== Early life ==
John Willis Ellis was born in the eastern part of Rowan County, North Carolina, which has since become part of Davidson County. He attended the University of North Carolina, studied law under Richmond Mumford Pearson, practiced law, and was elected to the North Carolina General Assembly from Rowan County. He served as a state superior court judge from 1848 to 1858.

Ellis won the governorship in the August 1858 election by a large majority over his opponent Duncan K. McRae, a Democrat supported by remnants of the Whig Party. Ellis was re-elected in 1860 by a smaller margin, defeating the Whig candidate, John Pool.

== Civil War and death ==
Following the election of Abraham Lincoln as US President in November 1860, Ellis called for a conference of southern states “to enter into consultation with us, upon the present condition of the country." As a supporter of slavery, Governor Ellis also called on North Carolina to prepare troops for war and consider convening a state secession convention.

Wary of making the first move, North Carolina did not secede immediately, but Ellis began to take a hostile tone towards the new Lincoln administration. During the Fort Sumter crisis in April 1861, President Lincoln requested troops from North Carolina to quell the rebellion. Ellis replied, "I can be no party to this wicked violation of the laws of the country and to this war upon the liberties of a free people. You can get no troops from North Carolina." Governor Ellis then seized several North Carolina coastal forts, the Federal arsenal at Fayetteville and the branch mint at Charlotte. Flushed with success, the Governor requested that the legislature call a state-wide convention consider secession, and on May 17 he telegraphed Confederate President Jefferson Davis to report, “I am in possession of forts, arsenals, etc., come as soon as you choose. We are ready to join you to a man. Strike the blow quickly and Washington will be ours.” The state convention voted unanimously on May 20 to secede from the Union, and North Carolina was admitted to the Confederacy the following day.

Sick with consumption and worn down by the stresses of his office during the secession crisis, Ellis died in office on July 7, 1861. The Speaker of the North Carolina Senate, Henry T. Clark, completed his term. He is buried at the Old English Cemetery in Salisbury, North Carolina.

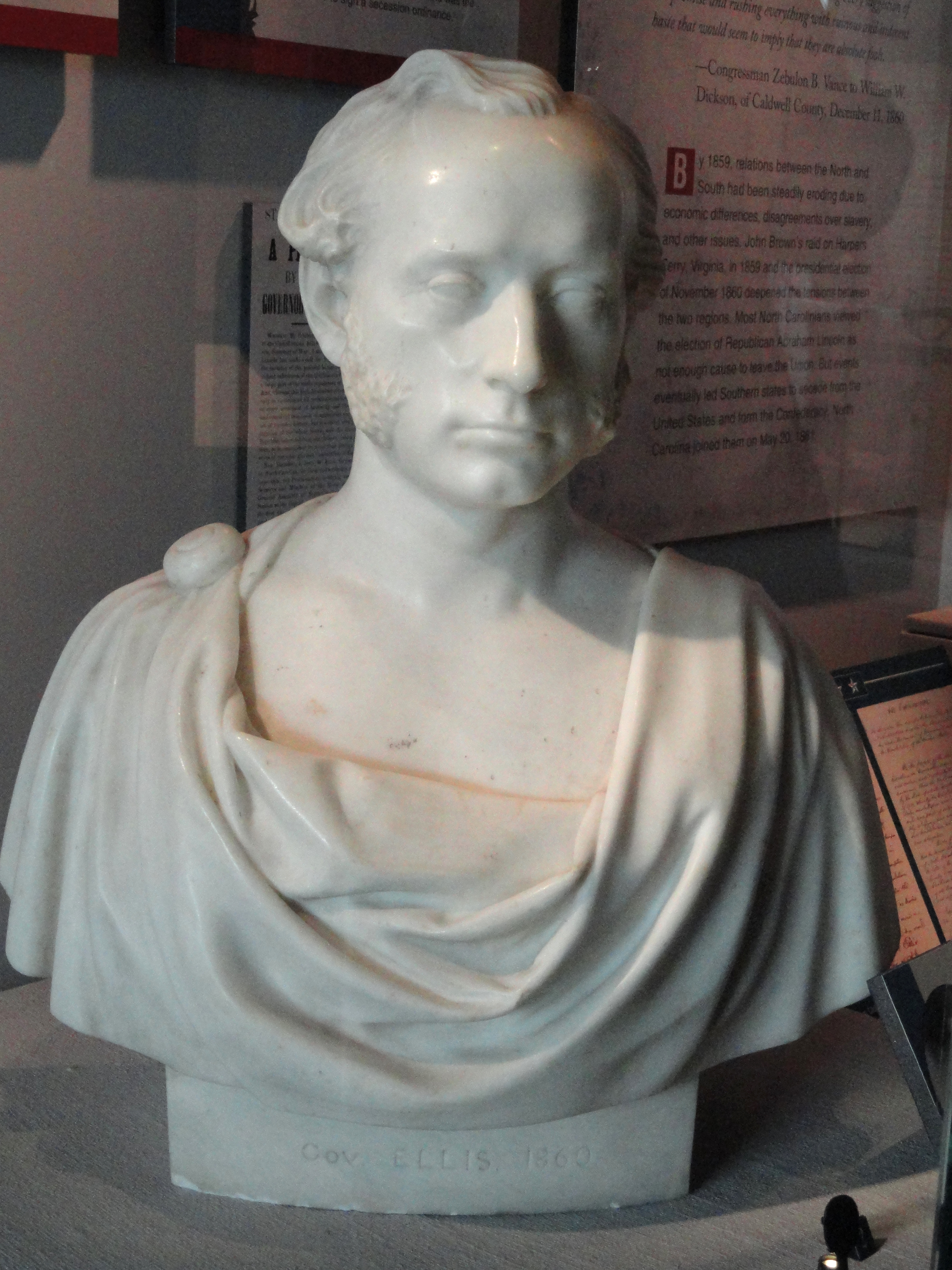
Bust of John Willis Ellis at the North Carolina Museum of History.

Party political offices
Preceded by Thomas Bragg	Democratic nominee for Governor of North Carolina; 1858, 1860	Succeeded by Jonathan Worth
Political offices
Preceded by Thomas Bragg	Governor of North Carolina; 1859–1861	Succeeded by Henry T. Clark
