= List of museums in North Carolina =

This list of museums in North Carolina is a list of museums, defined for this context as institutions (including nonprofit organizations, government entities, and private businesses) that collect and care for objects of cultural, artistic, scientific, or historical interest and make their collections or related exhibits available for public viewing. Museums that exist only in cyberspace (i.e., virtual museums) are not included.

== Museums ==
Name	Town/City	County	Region	Type	Summary
82nd Airborne Division War Memorial Museum	Fort Bragg	Cumberland	Fayetteville metro area	Military	Exhibits include the history of the 82nd Airborne Division and historic military aircraft.
Ackland Art Museum	Chapel Hill	Orange	The Triangle	Art	Part of the University of North Carolina at Chapel Hill, collection includes Asian art, works on paper (drawings, prints, and photographs), European masterworks, 20th-century and contemporary art, African art and North Carolina pottery
A.D. Gallery	Pembroke	Robeson	Piedmont	Art	Part of the University of North Carolina at Pembroke
African American Atelier	Greensboro	Guilford	Piedmont Triad	Art	website, visual arts and culture of African Americans, located in the Greensboro Cultural Center
African American Cultural Complex	Raleigh	Wake	The Triangle	African American	Contributions made by African Americans, open by appointment
Agriculture and Transportation Museum	Murfreesboro	Hertford	Inner Banks	Multiple	website, operated by the Murfreesboro Historical Association, antique farm equipment and implements, early carriages, buggies and other vehicles
Airborne & Special Operations Museum	Fayetteville	Cumberland	Fayetteville metro area	Military	Recounts heroic actions of Airborne & Special Operations forces
Alamance Battleground State Historic Site	Burlington	Alamance	Piedmont Triad	Military	Visitor center exhibits focus on American Revolution battle, also historic Allen House
Alamance County Historical Museum	Burlington	Alamance	Piedmont Triad	Historic house	Located in the Victorian-period L. Banks Holt House
Alexander-Little Wing	Wadesboro	Anson	Sandhills	Historic house	Operated by the Anson County Historical Society, 19th-century period house
Alleghany Historical Museum	Sparta	Alleghany	Western	Local history	Operated by the Alleghany Historical – Genealogical Society
Allison-Deaver House	Brevard	Transylvania	Western	Historic house	website, early 19th-century house operated by the Transylvania County Historical Society
American Classic Motorcycle Museum	Asheboro	Randolph	Piedmont Triad	Transportation	Harley Davidson motorcycles
American Military Museum	Gastonia	Gaston	Metro Charlotte	Military	
Andy Griffith Museum	Mount Airy	Surry	Foothills	Biographical	Memorabilia of actor Andy Griffith and the Andy Griffith Show, located at The Andy Griffith Playhouse and Surry Arts Council
Antique Car Museum at Grovewood Village	Asheville	Buncombe	Western	Automotive	website, located in historic Grovewood Village in the former Biltmore Industries, Inc. weaving shops, includes antique cars, horse-drawn wagons, a fire truck.
Arts Council of Henderson County	Hendersonville	Henderson	Western	Art	website, includes exhibit gallery
Arts Council of Wayne County	Goldsboro	Wayne	Piedmont	Art	Includes an art gallery
Artspace	Raleigh	Wake	The Triangle	Art	website, visual art center with 3 galleries
Ashe-Covington Medical Museum	Wadesboro	Anson	Sandhills	Medical	website, operated by the Anson County Historical Society
Asheville Art Museum	Asheville	Buncombe	Western	Art	Focus is 20th and 21st century American art and works of significance to Western North Carolina's cultural heritage
Asheville Museum of Science	Asheville	Buncombe	Western	Natural history	website, hall of minerals, mining, fossils, astronomy, gemology, geology, meteorology, mineralogy, oceanography, formerly the Colburn Earth Science Museum
Asheville Pinball Museum	Asheville	Buncombe	Western	Pinball	website
Asheville Radio Museum	Asheville	Buncombe	Western	Radio history	website, housed on the Ashevile-Buncome Technical community college campus.
Aurora Fossil Museum	Aurora	Beaufort	Inner Banks	Natural history	Area fossils, shark jaws, archaeological artifacts including projectile points, stone tools, jewelry and cooking implements of Native Americans from Eastern North Carolina
Ava Gardner Museum	Smithfield	Johnston	Inner Banks	Biographical	Life of actress Ava Gardner
Averasboro Battlefield and Museum	Dunn	Harnett	The Triangle	Military	History of the Battle of Averasborough
Avery County Historical Museum	Newland	Avery	Western	Local history	Located in the former county jail
A.W. Ange House	Winterville	Pitt	Inner Banks	Historic house	Victorian house, operated by the Winterville Historical and Arts Society, open by appointment and for events
Aycock Birthplace	Fremont	Wayne	Piedmont	Historic house	Mid-19th century period home of governor Charles Brantley Aycock
Ayr Mount	Hillsborough	Orange	The Triangle	Historic house	Federal period plantation home
Backing Up Classics Auto Museum	Concord	Cabarrus	Metro Charlotte	Automotive	website
Badin Historic Museum	Badin	Stanly	Metro Charlotte	Local history	website, local history, adjacent 1915-period residence and a firehouse museum
Barker House	Edenton	Chowan	Inner Banks	Historic house	18th century house
Barton College Art Galleries	Wilson	Wilson	Inner Banks	Art	Located in the Case Art Building
The Bascom	Highlands	Macon	Western	Art	website, regional art gallery
Beaufort Historic Site	Beaufort	Carteret	Crystal Coast	Open air	Includes six restored buildings which are open for tours
Bechtler Museum of Modern Art	Charlotte	Mecklenburg	Metro Charlotte	Art	Focus is mid-20th century European and American modern art, with museum building designed by Mario Botta, located in the Levine Center for the Arts
Belhaven Memorial Museum	Belhaven	Beaufort	Inner Banks	Local history	website
Bellamy Mansion	Wilmington	New Hanover	Lower Cape Fear	Historic house	Changing exhibits on architectural history, historic preservation and the design arts
Belmont Historical Society	Belmont	Gaston	Metro Charlotte	Local history	website
Bennett Classics Antique Car Museum	Forest City	Rutherford	Western	Automotive	website
Bennett Place State Historic Site	Durham	Durham	The Triangle	Civil War	Site of the largest surrender of Confederate soldiers during the American Civil War, includes reconstructed period farmhouse, visitor center with exhibits
Ben Owen Pottery	Seagrove	Randolph	Piedmont Triad	Art	website, includes museum of pottery
Benson Museum of Local History	Benson	Johnston	Piedmont	Local history	
Bentonville Battlefield State Historic Site	Princeton	Johnston	The Triangle	Civil War	Site of the Battle of Bentonville, includes visitor center with battle displays, period field hospital historic house
Big Ivy Historical Park	Barnardsville	Buncombe	Piedmont	Open air	Operated by the Big Ivy Historical Society
Billy Graham Library	Charlotte	Mecklenburg	Metro Charlotte	Biographical	Features exhibits about the life and works of Christian evangelist Billy Graham
Biltmore Estate	Asheville	Buncombe	Western	Historic house	French Renaissance inspired chateau with collections of decorative arts and 75 acres (300,000 m^{2}) of formal gardens
Biltmore Industries Homespun Museum	Asheville	Buncombe	Western	History	website, located at Grovewood Gallery, history, fine cloth and woodworking crafts of the Biltmore Industries, a school for workers on the Biltmore Estate
Black Cat Station	North Wilkesboro	Wilkes	Western	Railroad	website, model railroad layouts
Black Mountain Center for the Arts	Black Mountain	Buncombe	Western	Art	website, includes gallery
Black Mountain College Museum + Arts Center	Asheville	Buncombe	Western	Art	website, includes two floors of galleries, research center, and performance space
Bladenboro Museum	Bladenboro	Bladen	Piedmont	Multiple	website, local history and art, hand-crafted miniature buildings, military artifacts, farm equipment and tools, photos, operated by the Bladenboro Historical Society
Blandwood Mansion and Gardens	Greensboro	Guilford	Piedmont Triad	Historic house	Italianate home of former North Carolina Governor John Motley Morehead
Blount-Bridgers House	Tarboro	Edgecombe	Inner Banks	Multiple	Operated by Edgecombe ARTS, includes changing and permanent art exhibits, decorative art, furnishings and textiles, and the separate Pender Museum of Edgecombe County History, open by appointment
Blowing Rock Art and History Museum	Blowing Rock	Watauga	Western	Multiple	website, area art, culture and history
Bodie Island Lighthouse	Nags Head	Dare	Outer Banks	Maritime	Lighthouse to climb
Boggan-Hammond House	Wadesboro	Anson	Sandhills	Historic house	Operated by the Anson County Historical Society, 18th-century period house
Brady C. Jefcoat Museum	Murfreesboro	Hertford	Inner Banks	History	Collection of Americana
Brevard Station Museum	Stanley	Gaston	Metro Charlotte	Local history	website
Brock Historical Museum of Greensboro College	Greensboro	Guilford	Piedmont Triad	History	website, history of Greensboro College
Brunswick Town/Fort Anderson State Historic Site	Smithville Township	Brunswick	Lower Cape Fear	Archaeology	Ruins of colonial town and Civil War era fort
Buckner Hill Plantation	Faison	Duplin	Piedmont	Historic house	Open by appointment, mid-19th century plantation house
Burgwin-Wright House	Wilmington	New Hanover	Lower Cape Fear	Historic house	18th-century house with 18th and 19th-century furnishings
Burke Arts Council	Morganton	Burke	Western	Art	website, features gallery with changing exhibits
Burke Heritage Museum	Morganton	Burke	Western	Local history	website, operated by the Historic Burke Foundation, located in the Old Burke County Courthouse
Burwell School Historic Site	Hillsborough	Orange	The Triangle	Historic house	1830s female academy and home, depicts mid-19th century life
Bryant House and McLendon Cabin	Carthage	Moore	Sandhills	Historic house	website, operated by the Moore County Historical Association
Cabarrus County Veterans Museum	Concord	Cabarrus	Metro Charlotte	Military	website, operated by the Historic Cabarrus Association, located in the Cabarrus County Governmental Center
Caldwell Arts Council	Lenoir	Caldwell	Western	Art	website, features gallery with changing exhibits
Caldwell Heritage Museum	Lenoir	Caldwell	Western	Local history	website, history of Caldwell County
Camden County Jail	Camden	Camden	Inner Banks	Prison	Historic prison and local history
Cameron Art Museum	Wilmington	New Hanover	Lower Cape Fear	Art	Collection includes fine arts, crafts, and design
Canton Area Historical Museum	Canton	Haywood	Western	Local history	
Cape Fear Museum	Wilmington	New Hanover	Lower Cape Fear	Multiple	History, natural science and cultures of the Lower Cape Fear region
Cape Hatteras Light	Buxton	Dare	Outer Banks	Maritime	Includes lighthouse and adjacent Museum of the Sea
Carl J. McEwen Historic Village	Mint Hill	Mecklenburg	Metro Charlotte	Open air	website, operated by the Mint Hill Historical Society, includes Mint Hill Country Doctor's Museum, Ira V. Ferguson Country Store, school house, assay office and outbuildings
Carl Sandburg Home National Historic Site	Flat Rock	Henderson	Western	Biographical	Home of Pulitzer Prize-winning poet and writer Carl Sandburg
Carolina Basketball Museum	Chapel Hill	Orange	The Triangle	Sports	Part of University of North Carolina at Chapel Hill
Carolinas Aviation Museum	Charlotte	Mecklenburg	Metro Charlotte	Aviation	Over 50 aircraft, including flying Piedmont DC3
Carson House	Marion	McDowell	Western	Historic house	19th century plantation home
Carthage Museum	Carthage	Moore	Sandhills	Local history	
Caswell Center Museum	Kinston	Lenoir	Inner Banks	Medical	History of the Caswell Developmental Center, a center for adults with intellectual disability and other developmental disabilities
Caswell No.1 Fire Station Museum	Kinston	Lenoir	Inner Banks	Firefighting	
Catawba County Firefighters Museum	Catawba	Catawba	Western	Firefighting	Includes fire truck, uniforms, firefighting and communications equipment
Catawba County Museum of History	Newton	Catawba	Western	Local history	website, operated by the Historical Association of Catawba County
Catawba Science Center	Hickory	Catawba	Western	Science	website
Catawba Valley Furniture Museum	Hickory	Catawba	Western	Decorative arts	Part of Hickory Furniture Mart, historic furniture, tools, area furniture makers
Catherine Smith Gallery	Boone	Watauga	Western	Art	Part of the Schaefer Center for the Performing Arts at Appalachian State University
Cedarock Historical Farm	Graham	Alamance	Piedmont Triad	Farm	19th-century farm
Centennial Campus Center for Wildlife Education	Raleigh	Wake	The Triangle	Natural history	website, ecology and environment of the Piedmont, operated by the N.C. Wildlife Resources Commission
Center for Craft, Creativity and Design	Hendersonville	Henderson	Western	Art	website, includes decorative arts gallery, a regional inter-institutional center of the University of North Carolina
Century Post Office Museum	Winton	Hertford	Inner Banks	Philatelic	Open by appointment
C. Grier Beam Truck Museum	Cherryville	Gaston	Metro Charlotte	Automotive	Trucks, early tractors and trailers, trucking memorabilia
Chadbourn Depot Museum	Chadbourn	Columbus	Piedmont	Railroad	Facebook site, includes model railroads, period furnishings, Audubon prints, railroad memorabilia
Charlotte Hawkins Brown Museum	Sedalia	Guilford	Piedmont Triad	African American	Former school, exhibits on contributions made by African American citizens to education in North Carolina
Charlotte Museum of History	Charlotte	Mecklenburg	Metro Charlotte	Multiple	website, includes local history museum and 1774 Hezekiah Alexander House with costumed guides
Charlotte Nature Museum	Charlotte	Mecklenburg	Metro Charlotte	Natural history	Operated by Discovery Place, features interactive nature exhibits and live animals
Chatham Historical Museum	Pittsboro	Chatham	The Triangle	Local history	website, operated by the Chatham County Historical Association
Cherokee County Historical Museum	Murphy	Cherokee	Western	Local history	website, include Cherokee artifacts and history, minerals, dolls
Cherry Hospital Museum	Goldsboro	Wayne	Piedmont	Medical	History of Cherry Hospital, a historic psychiatric hospital for African Americans, open by appointment
Chicamacomico Life-Saving Station	Rodanthe	Dare	Outer Banks	Maritime	Includes two stations and five outbuildings
Children's Museum of Alamance County	Graham	Alamance	Piedmont Triad	Children's	website
Children's Museum of Wilmington	Wilmington	New Hanover	Lower Cape Fear	Children's	website
Children's Museum of Winston-Salem	Winston-Salem	Forsyth	Piedmont Triad	Children's	Goal is to teach children literature, building, zoology
Children's Playhouse	Boone	Watauga	Western	Children's	website
Chinqua Penn Plantation	Reidsville	Rockingham	Foothills	Historic house	1920s 27 room English countryside mansion with decorative arts and furnishings
Chowan University Green Hall Art Galleries	Murfreesboro	Hertford	Inner Banks	Art	
City of Raleigh Museum	Raleigh	Wake	The Triangle	Local history	City history
Clay County Historical & Arts Council Museum	Hayesville	Clay	Western	Local history	Housed in the old jail, includes 1920s – 1940s office of a local doctor and outdoor Cherokee Homestead Exhibit, operated by the Clay County Historical & Arts Council
Clemmons Educational State Forest	Clayton	Johnston	The Triangle	Natural history	Includes the Forestry Exhibit Center with interactive exhibits about the ecology of forests, soil, water, wildlife and the state's cultural history
Cliffs of the Neuse State Park	Seven Springs	Wayne	Piedmont	Natural history	Geology and natural history of the cliffs and the park
Coats Museum	Coats	Harnett	The Triangle	Local history	Local history displays, adjacent Cotton Museum about cotton farming, weaving
Coffey's General Store	Collettsville	Caldwell	Western	History	Historic general store with a collection of antiques, original store fixtures and photographs
Columbia Theater Cultural Resources Center	Columbia	Tyrell	Inner Banks	Multiple	website, local culture and environment, particularly heritage of farming, fishing, and forestry, operated by Partnership for the Sounds
Concord Museum	Concord	Cabarrus	Metro Charlotte	Local history	website, operated by the Historic Cabarrus Association in the Cabarrus County Courthouse
Contemporary Art Museum of Raleigh	Raleigh	Wake	The Triangle	Art	Multimedia contemporary art and design gallery
Core Sound Waterfowl Museum	Harkers Island	Carteret	Crystal Coast	Multiple	website, includes duck decoys, local history, culture and natural history and environment
Corolla Wild Horse Museum	Corolla	Currituck	Outer Banks	Natural history	website
Country Doctor Museum	Bailey	Nash	The Triangle	Medical	website, history of rural health care in the United States
Cowan Museum of History and Science	Kenansville	Duplin	Piedmont	Multiple	website, includes historic farm and general tools and equipment, rock specimens, local history exhibits, park with historic village buildings
Cradle of Forestry	Brevard	Transylvania	Western	Multiple	Nature, conservation, science, forestry, includes two nature trails with historic forestry buildings and equipment, Forest Discovery Center with exhibits about the forest and forestry
Creation Museum & Taxidermy Hall of Fame	Southern Pines	Moore	Sandhills	Creationist	Includes stuffed animal mounts and antique tools
Crossnore Fine Arts Gallery	Crossnore	Avery	Western	Textile	Fine art gallery, weaving studio and exhibits, and a retail shop
C. S. Brown Regional Cultural Arts Center	Winton	Hertford	Inner Banks	African American	website
CSS Neuse State Historic Site	Kinston	Lenoir	Inner Banks	Military	Remains of the hull of the Confederate ironclad CSS Neuse
Cultural Heritage Museum	Kinston	Lenoir	Inner Banks	African American	Open by appointment
Cupola House	Edenton	Chowan	Inner Banks	Historic house	
Curb Museum for Music and Motorsports	Kannapolis	Cabarrus	Metro Charlotte	Multiple	Includes memorabilia of Curb musicians, the North Carolina Music Hall of Fame with photos and memorabilia of notable state musicians, and NASCAR vehicles, photos and memorabilia
Currituck Beach Light	Corolla	Currituck	Outer Banks	Maritime	Lighthouse to climb, operated by the Outer Banks Conservationists
Dare County Regional Airport Museum	Manteo	Dare	Outer Banks	Aviation	Features models of aircraft that played a part in the aviation history of Dare County, history of the airport and area aviation
Darshana Hall Plantation	Cleveland	Rowan	Metro Charlotte	Historic house	website
David John Aaron Museum	Mount Olive	Wayne	Piedmont	Local history	Operated by the Mount Olive Area Historical Society
Davidson County Historical Museum	Lexington	Davidson	Piedmont Triad	Local history	Located in the former county courthouse
Delta Arts Center	Winston-Salem	Forsyth	Piedmont Triad	Art	website, arts & humanities, with an emphasis on African American contributions
Diggs Gallery	Winston-Salem	Forsyth	Piedmont Triad	Art	website, part of Winston-Salem State University, dedicated to African and African-American art
Discovery Place	Charlotte	Mecklenburg	Metro Charlotte	Science	
Discovery Place KIDS	Huntersville	Mecklenburg	Metro Charlotte	Children's	
Dr. Robert Smith House	Mount Airy	Surry	Foothills	Local history	Depicts early 20th century life
Dr. Josephus Hall House	Salisbury	Rowan	Metro Charlotte	Historic house	website, operated by the Historic Salisbury Foundation, mid-19th century period house
Dry Ridge Historical Museum	Weaverville	Buncombe	Western	Local history	Located in the Weaverville Public Library
Duke Homestead State Historic Site	Durham	Durham	The Triangle	Open air	1850s home, factories, tobacco farm and museum
Duplin County Veterans Museum	Warsaw	Duplin	Piedmont	Military	website
Earl Scruggs Center	Shelby	Cleveland	Metro Charlotte	Biographical	Life of musician Earl Scruggs, history and culture of the American South
Eastern Carolina Village & Farm Museum	Greenville	Pitt	Inner Banks	Open air	website, depicts buildings and agriculture history from 1840 - 1940
Eastern Cabarrus Historical Society Museum	Mount Pleasant	Cabarrus	Metro Charlotte	Local history	
Edgecombe County Veterans Military Museum	Tarboro	Edgecombe	Inner Banks	Military	website
Edwards-Franklin House	Low Gap	Surry	Foothills	Historic house	Early 19th-century house, operated by the Surry County Historical Society
Elsewhere Artist Collaborative	Greensboro	Guilford	Piedmont Triad	Art	website, changing, interactive environment of artworks, objects, and events in a former thrift store
EnergyExplorium	Huntersville	Mecklenburg	Metro Charlotte	Science	website, located at McGuire Nuclear Station, exhibits about electricity
Erwin History Museum	Erwin	Harnett	The Triangle	Local history	WEBSITE
Fair Bluff Depot Museum	Fair Bluff	Columbus	Piedmont	Local history	Operated by the Greater Fair Bluff Historical Society
Faison Museum	Faison	Duplin	Piedmont	Local history	Displays in the Faison branch library
Fascinate-U Children's Museum	Fayetteville	Cumberland	Fayetteville metro area	Children's	website
Fayetteville Area Transportation Museum	Fayetteville	Cumberland	Fayetteville metro area	Transportation	Located in a historic depot, displays include railroads, cars, local history
Fayetteville Independent Light Infantry Armory and Museum	Fayetteville	Cumberland	Fayetteville metro area	Military	website, history of the private militia, open by appointment
Fifth Avenue Mask Museum	Hendersonville	Henderson	Western	Anthropology	Native masks, dolls dressed in native garb and locally produced textiles, open by appointment
Flat Top Manor	Blowing Rock	Watauga	Western	Historic house	Also known as Moses Cone Manor, located in Moses H. Cone Memorial Park, tours of the Victorian mansion's second floor, first floor houses the Parkway Craft Center
Folk Art Center	Asheville	Buncombe	Western	Art	Appalachian folk art, crafts and culture, operated by the Southern Highland Craft Guild
Foothills Arts Council	Elkin	Surry	Foothills	Art	Includes a regional art gallery
Fort Defiance	Lenoir	Caldwell	Western	Historic house	1792 home of Revolutionary general William Lenoir
Fort Dobbs	Statesville	Iredell	Metro Charlotte	Military	Remains of the 18th-century fort from the French and Indian War era
Fort Branch	Hamilton	Martin	Inner Banks	Military	Confederate earthen fort
Fort Fisher State Historic Site	Wilmington	New Hanover	Lower Cape Fear	Military	Restored fort and museum
Fort Macon State Park	Beaufort	Carteret	Crystal Coast	Military	Restored fort and museum
Fort Raleigh National Historic Site	Roanoke Island	Dare	Outer Banks	History	Includes history of Sir Walter Raleigh's "Lost Colony" and local history
Foscue Plantation	Pollocksville	Jones	Inner Banks	Historic house	website, early 19th-century plantation house
Franklin Gem & Mineral Museum	Franklin	Macon	Western	Natural history	website, gems, minerals, fossils, Indian artifacts, fluorescent mineral display, sea shells, located in a former jail
Fremont Heritage Museum	Fremont	Wayne	Piedmont	Local history	Operated by the Fremont Historical Society
Frisco Native American Museum & Natural History Center	Frisco	Dare	Outer Banks	Multiple	website, Native American artifacts, art, and culture, natural history displays
Fuquay-Varina Museums Complex	Fuquay-Varina	Wake	The Triangle	Local history	website, includes the First Fuquay Post Office, the "Squire" Ballentine Schoolhouse, and the Centennial Museum
Gaston County Museum	Dallas	Gaston	Metro Charlotte	Multiple	website, art, transportation, textiles, historic hotel
General William C. Lee Airborne Museum	Dunn	Harnett	The Triangle	Biographical	website, former home and military history of General William C. Lee
Gertrude Smith House	Mount Airy	Surry	Foothills	Historic house	Depicts early 20th century life
GI Memorial House Museum	Kannapolis	Cabarrus	Metro Charlotte	Historic house	1945 house built for WWII veterans, operated by the Kannapolis History Associates
Gibsonville Museum	Gibsonville	Alamance	Piedmont Triad	Local history	
Gold Hill Mines Historic Park	Gold Hill Township	Rowan	Piedmont	Mining	website, includes Assay Museum, jail and mine shafts
Gourd Museum	Angier	Harnett	The Triangle	Commodity	Gourd crafts from around the world
Graham County Museum of Prehistoric Relics	Fontana Dam	Graham	Western	Archaeology	Located at the Hike Inn, pre-historic artifacts from North, Central and South America
Graham Historical Museum	Graham	Alamance	Piedmont Triad	Local history	Located in the 1914 Graham Fire House
Grandfather Mountain Nature Museum	Linville	Avery	Western	Natural history	website, animals, plants and geology of Grandfather Mountain and surrounding area
Granite Falls History & Transportation Museum	Granite Falls	Caldwell	Western	Local history	website, located in the 1790s Andrew Baird House, local history and transportation, art exhibits
Granville County History Museum	Oxford	Granville	Piedmont	Local history	website, operated by the Granville County Historical Society in the former county jail
Graveyard of the Atlantic Museum	Hatteras	Dare	Outer Banks	Maritime	maritime history and shipwrecks of the Outer Banks
Green Hill Center	Greensboro	Guilford	Piedmont Triad	Art	website, visual arts center with exhibitions of contemporary art and a family gallery
Greene County Museum	Snow Hill	Greene	Inner Banks	Multiple	website, local and regional art and local history
Greensboro Children's Museum	Greensboro	Guilford	Piedmont Triad	Children's	website
Greensboro College Art Galleries	Greensboro	Guilford	Piedmont Triad	Art	Anne Rudd Galyon & Irene Cullis Galleries, located in Cowan Humanities Building
Greensboro Historical Museum	Greensboro	Guilford	Piedmont Triad	Local history	Exhibits include O. Henry, First Lady Dolley Madison, the Greensboro Sit-ins, period displays, also late 18th century McNairy House and early 19th century Isley House
Greensboro Science Center	Greensboro	Guilford	Piedmont Triad	Natural history	Natural history and science museum, zoo and aquarium
Greenville Museum of Art	Greenville	Pitt	Inner Banks	Art	website, collections focuses on works by North Carolina artists and noted American Landscape artists from 1860 to present
Gregg Museum of Art & Design	Raleigh	Wake	The Triangle	Art	website, part of North Carolina State University, applied and decorative arts including textiles, ceramics, outsider/folk art, paintings, photography, sculpture, architectural drawings, archaeological artifacts, ethnographic materials and modern furniture
Grifton Historical Museum	Grifton	Pitt	Inner Banks	Local history	website, includes tools and equipment for office, shop, farm and kitchen, Tuscorora artifacts, military displays, natural history, Catechna Indian Village replica
Guilford College Art Gallery	Greensboro	Guilford	Piedmont Triad	Art	
Guilford Courthouse National Military Park	Greensboro	Guilford	Piedmont Triad	Military	Revolutionary War battlefield and museum
Hammerstone Scout Museum	Lillington	Harnett	The Triangle	Scouting	website, memorabilia of Scouting pioneers and heroes, open by appointment
Hands On!	Hendersonville	Henderson	Western	Children's	website
Hanes Art Gallery	Winston-Salem	Forsyth	Piedmont Triad	Art	website, part of Wake Forest University, located in the Scales Fine Arts Center
Harmony Hall	Kinston	Lenoir	Inner Banks	Historic house	Operated by the Lenoir County Historical Association, 18th-century house with 19th-century Victorian furnishings
Harmony Hall Plantation	White Oak	Bladen	Piedmont	Open air	Includes 18th-century house, schoolhouse, two restored country stores, a chapel, corn-crib, external kitchen, log cabin and a gatehouse
Harnett County Indian Museum	Kipling	Harnett	The Triangle	Native American	Includes a craft shop, Native American artifacts, open by appointment
Harper House/Hickory History Center	Hickory	Catawba	Western	Historic house	website, operated by the Historical Association of Catawba County, late 19th-century Queen Anne house, adjacent Bonniwell-Lyerly House in the Craftsman style
Harris Hall Museum	Oxford	Granville	Piedmont	Multiple	website, changing exhibits of science, history, art, and culture, operated by the Granville County Historical Society
Harvey B. Gantt Center	Charlotte	Mecklenburg	Metro Charlotte	Art	Works by African American artists, located in the Levine Center for the Arts
Hatteras Histories and Mysteries Museum	Buxton	Dare	Outer Banks	History	Archaeological artifacts, history and culture of Hatteras Island
Havelock Tourist & Event Center	Havelock	Craven	Crystal Coast	Aviation	website, features exhibits about the Marine Corps history and aircraft
Haw River Town Museum	Haw River	Alamance	Piedmont Triad	Local history	
Haywood Hall	Raleigh	Wake	The Triangle	Historic house	Historic home of John Haywood
Henderson County Heritage Museum	Hendersonville	Henderson	Western	Local history	
Henderson Institute Historical Museum	Henderson	Vance	Western	African American	History of the former African American school and its graduates
Hendersonville Antique Toy Museum	Hendersonville	Henderson	Western	Toy	Toys, dolls, dollhouses, model trains
Hendersonville Depot	Hendersonville	Henderson	Western	Railroad	Late 19th-century train depot, home to the Apple Valley Model Railroad Club with model trail layout
Hendrick Motorsports Museum	Concord	Cabarrus	Metro Charlotte	Automotive	website, cars, trophies, and memorabilia from the Hendrick Motorsports racing teams
Hickory Aviation Museum	Hickory	Catawba	Western	Aviation	Historic military aircraft, aircraft weapons, flight suits, art, models
Hickory Museum of Art	Hickory	Catawba	Western	Art	American art including paintings, contemporary, folk, outsider, studio art glass and pottery
Hickory Ridge Homestead	Boone	Watauga	Western	Living	Located on the grounds of the Horn in the West, Revolutionary War mountain community
Hiddenite Center	Hiddenite	Alexander	Western	Multiple	Includes Victorian Lucas Mansion and art gallery, doll collection from the 19th century, native gems and minerals
Highlands Historical Village	Highlands	Macon	Western	Local history	website, operated by the Highlands Historical Society, includes the House-Boynton-Trapier-Wright Home ("the Prince House"), the Highlands Historical Museum and Archives, and Bug Hill Cottage
Highlands Nature Center	Highlands	Macon	Western	Natural history	website, part of Highlands Biological Station that includes a botanical garden
High Point Museum	High Point	Guilford	Piedmont Triad	Multiple	website, includes local history museum with exhibits about the area furniture industry, 1801 Hoggatt House, 1786 Haley House and a blacksmith shop
Historic Bath	Bath	Beaufort	Inner Banks	Open air	Includes guided tours of the Palmer-Marsh House, Van Der Veer House, Bonner House
Historic Edenton	Edenton	Chowan	Inner Banks	Open air	website, tours include the James Iredell House, Roanoke River Light, Barker House, Cupola House, Chowan County Courthouse and St. Paul's Episcopal Church
History Museum of Burke County	Morganton	Burke	Western	Local history	website
Historic Bethabara Park	Winston-Salem	Forsyth	Piedmont Triad	Open air	Site of first settlement by members of the Moravian Church in 1753
Historic Halifax State Historic Site	Halifax	Halifax	Inner Banks	Open air	website, includes visitor center museum, several 18th & early 19th century historic houses, tavern, tap room, Clerk of Court's Office, Jail and the Montfort archaeological exhibit
Historic Hope Plantation	Windsor	Bertie	Inner Banks	Historic house	Includes the 1803 Hope Mansion and 1763 King-Bazemore House
Historic Johnson Farm	Hendersonville	Henderson	Western	Farm	website, includes farm house, boarding house, barn loft museum, animals; heritage education center owned by Henderson County Public Schools
Historic Latta Plantation	Huntersville	Mecklenburg	Metro Charlotte	Living	1800 cotton plantation and living history farm
Historic Oak View	Raleigh	Wake	The Triangle	Farm	Includes agriculture exhibit, 1855 farmhouse and detached kitchen, livestock barn, carriage house, and turn-of-the-20th-century cotton gin
Historic Rockwell Museum	Rockwell	Rowan	Metro Charlotte	Local history	
Historic Rosedale Plantation	Charlotte	Mecklenburg	Metro Charlotte	Historic house	13 room antebellum plantation and gardens
Historic Stagville	Durham	Durham	The Triangle	Open air	18th century plantation house, slave cabins, farmer's house, visitor center and barn
Historic Vance House & Civil War Museum	Statesville	Iredell	Metro Charlotte	Historic house	information, home Zebulon Vance
Historic Yates Mill County Park	Raleigh	Wake	The Triangle	Mill	History gristmill and exhibits on the park's natural and cultural history
History House Museum	Tillery	Halifax	Inner Banks	Local history	website, history of 1930s New Deal African American resettlement farm
History Museum of Carteret County	Morehead City	Carteret	Crystal Coast	Local history	website, operated by the Carteret County Historical Society, includes textiles, period clothing, furniture, military memorabilia, glassware and artwork
Horace Williams House	Chapel Hill	Orange	The Triangle	Art	Changing exhibits presented by the Preservation Society of Chapel Hill
Horne Creek Living Historical Farm	Pinnacle	Stokes	Foothills	Farm	Depicts 1900-1910 farm life
Houck's Chapel	Hickory	Catawba	Western	Religious	Operated by the Hickory Landmarks Society, late 19th century church, open by appointment
House in the Horseshoe	Sanford	Moore	Sandhills	Historic house	Late 18th century period plantation home
House of Flags Museum	Columbus	Polk	Western	History	website, historic American flags, military service and religious flags, flags of our founding countries and the Revolutionary War era
Hudson Depot Museum	Hudson	Caldwell	Western	Local history	History of the town of Hudson and the local railroad industry, open during special events and to school classes
Hugh Mangum Museum of Photography	Durham	Durham	The Triangle	History	Historic and contemporary photographs of Durham and its citizens
Hugh Torrance House and Store	Huntersville	Mecklenburg	Metro Charlotte	Historic house	website, early 19th-century period house and store
Imagination Station Science Museum	Wilson	Wilson	Inner Banks	Science	
Imperial Center for the Arts & Sciences	Rocky Mount	Nash	The Triangle	Multiple	website, includes the Maria V. Howard Arts Center and the Rocky Mount Children's Museum and Science Center
Ingram Planetarium	Sunset Beach	Brunswick	Lower Cape Fear	Science	Planetarium and science exhibits
International Civil Rights Center and Museum	Greensboro	Guilford	Piedmont Triad	History	History of the American civil rights movement
International Lineman's Museum	Shelby	Cleveland	Metro Charlotte	Industry	website, history of linemen and the electrical utility industry
Iredell Museums	Statesville	Iredell	Metro Charlotte	Multiple	website, three sites: Court Street Gallery for art exhibits, Gregory Creek Homestead with 9 cabins and living history events, Kids@Play children's museum
JAARS Museum of the Alphabet	Waxhaw	Union	Metro Charlotte	History	History of the development of the alphabet and written languages
Jesse Helms Center	Wingate	Union	Metro Charlotte	Biographical	Papers and works of Senator Jesse Helms, promotes "principles of free enterprise, representative democracy, traditional American values, and a strong national defense"
Jockey's Ridge State Park	Nags Head	Dare	Outer Banks	Natural history	Visitor center museum
Joel Lane Museum House	Raleigh	Wake	The Triangle	Historic house	Operated by the National Society of Colonial Dames of America, late 18th century period home
John Blue Complex	Laurinburg	Scotland	Sandhills	Multiple	Includes the 1890s John Blue House, sawmill, several 19th-century cabins, late 19th-century general store, a half-mile, 18 gauge railroad, a cotton gin, and the Historical Museum of Scotland County, which includes antique vehicles
John F. Kennedy Special Warfare Museum	Fort Bragg	Cumberland	Fayetteville metro area	Military	website, information, regimental museum for Special Forces, Military Information Support Operations and Civil Affairs units
Johnston County Heritage Center	Smithfield	Johnston	Inner Banks	Local history	website, exhibits housed in the Holding-Richardson Exhibit Hall or in the Visitors Bureau Gallery
J. Summie Propst House	Hickory	Catawba	Western	Historic house	Operated by the Hickory Landmarks Society, late 19th century Victorian house
Jugtown Pottery and Museum	Seagrove	Randolph	Piedmont Triad	Art	Includes museum of area pottery
Junaluska Museum and Memorial Site	Robbinsville	Graham	Western	Native American	Located at the burial site of Cherokee Warrior Junaluska, Cherokee history and culture
Kernersville Museum	Kernersville	Forsyth	Piedmont Triad	Local History	website
KidSenses	Rutherfordton	Rutherford	Western	Children's	website
Kidzu Children's Museum	Chapel Hill	Orange	The Triangle	Children's	Interactive exhibit for ages 0–8
Kings Mountain Historical Fire Museum	Kings Mountain	Gaston	Metro Charlotte	Firefighting	website
Kings Mountain Historical Museum	Kings Mountain	Gaston	Metro Charlotte	Local history	
Kinston Arts Center	Kinston	Lenoir	Inner Banks	Art	website, changing exhibits and model railroad display
Kirby Gallery	Roxboro	Person	Piedmont	Art	Regional art gallery
Korner's Folly	Kernersville	Forsyth	Piedmont Triad	Historic house	Unusual historic mansion
Lake Waccamaw Depot Museum	Lake Waccamaw	Columbus	Lower Cape Fear	Local history	
Latimer House	Wilmington	New Hanover	Lower Cape Fear	Historic house	website, operated by the Lower Cape Fear Historical Society, Victorian period home
Lawndale Museum	Lawndale	Cleveland	Metro Charlotte	Local history	Operated by the Lawndale Historical Society
Legends of Harley Drag Racing Museum	Raleigh	Wake	The Triangle	Transportation	Displays of Harley-Davidson drag racing motorcycles and memorabilia
Level 256 Classic Arcade Bar	Asheville	Buncombe	Western	Video Game	Website, Displays of video gaming consoles from the 1970s to present day.
Levine Museum of the New South	Charlotte	Mecklenburg	Metro Charlotte	History	Southern and regional history and culture since the Civil War
Liberty Hall	Kenansville	Duplin	Piedmont	Historic house	Late 18th century plantation house
Light Factory	Charlotte	Mecklenburg	Metro Charlotte	Art	website, photography and film and related light-generated mediums
Linbrook Heritage Estate	Trinity	Randolph	Piedmont Triad	Multiple	website, includes tours of 21st-century Linbrook Hall mansion, Neal Agricultural and Industrial Museum, early 20th-century Hoover farmshouse
Lincoln County Museum of History	Lincolnton	Lincoln	Metro Charlotte	Local history	website, operated by the Lincoln County Historical Association
Locust Historical Society and Museum	Locust	Stanly	Metro Charlotte	Local history	
Louisburg College Art Galleries	Louisburg	Franklin	The Triangle	Art	
Lumbee Indian Museum	Laurinburg	Scotland	Sandhills	Native American	
Lundy-Fetterman Museum	Buies Creek	Harnett	The Triangle	Natural history	Part of Campbell University in the Lundy-Fetterman School of Business, mounted game animals, seashells, university memorabilia
Macon County Historical Museum	Franklin	Macon	Western	Local history	Exhibits include Cherokee arrowheads and artifacts, early medical instruments and supplies, period clothing
Madison Dry Goods Museum	Madison	Rockingham	Foothills	History	website, exhibits include early 20th century hardware, hotel and funeral chapel displays
Maple Grove	Hickory	Catawba	Western	Historic house	Operated by the Hickory Landmarks Society, late 19th century Victorian house
Marbles Kids Museum	Raleigh	Wake	The Triangle	Children's	Formerly Exploris Museum
Matthews Heritage Museum	Matthews	Mecklenburg	Metro Charlotte	Local history	website, located in the 1880 Massey-Clark House, operated by the Matthews Historical Foundation
Maxton Museum	Maxton	Robeson	Piedmont	Local history	Operated by the Maxton Historical Society
May Museum and Park	Farmville	Pitt	Inner Banks	Local history	website
McColl Center for Art + Innovation	Charlotte	Mecklenburg	Metro Charlotte	Art	website, includes a contemporary craft gallery
McDowell House at Quaker Meadows	Morganton	Burke	Western	Historic house	Operated by the Historic Burke Foundation, 1812 period house
Memory Lane Museum	Mooresville	Iredell	Metro Charlotte	Automotive	website, retired NASCAR and vintage race cars, memorabilia, antique toys, pedal cars, bicycles, gas pumps, movie cars, tractors and vintage motorcycles
Mendenhall Homeplace	Jamestown	Guilford	Piedmont Triad	Historic house	1811 Quaker homeplace and plantation buildings
Meredith College Galleries	Raleigh	Wake	The Triangle	Art	Part of Meredith College
Mexico-Cardenas Museum	Waxhaw	Union	Metro Charlotte	Ethnic	Mexican culture and Lázaro Cárdenas, Mexico's president from 1934 to 1940
Mineral and Lapidary Museum	Hendersonville	Henderson	Western	Natural history	Minerals, rocks, fossils, Native American artifacts
Mint Museum Randolph	Charlotte	Mecklenburg	Metro Charlotte	Art	Located in a former U.S. mint, includes art of the ancient Americas, ceramics and decorative arts, fashion, European and African art
Mint Museum Uptown	Charlotte	Mecklenburg	Metro Charlotte	Art	Located in the Levine Center for the Arts, crafts, design, collections of American, contemporary, and European art
Missiles and More Museum	Topsail Beach	Pender	Lower Cape Fear	Local history	website, operated by the Historical Society of Topsail Island, exhibits include Operation Bumblebee, Camp Davis, pirates, Native Americans, natural history and the V-22 Osprey aircraft
Mitchell House Museum	Thomasville	Davidson	Piedmont Triad	History	History of the Mills Home orphanage, open by appointment
Montford Point Marines Museum	Jacksonville	Onslow	Inner Banks	Military	History of the Montford Point Marines, the first African American Marines, located at Camp Gilbert H. Johnson
Moogseum	Asheville	Buncombe	Western	Biographical	website, small space dedicated to the history and legacy of synthesizer inventor Bob Moog, run by the Moog Foundation
Moores Creek National Battlefield	Wilmington	Pender	Lower Cape Fear	Military	Revolutionary War battlefield and museum
Mooresville Museum	Mooresville	Iredell	Metro Charlotte	Local history	website
Mordecai Mansion	Raleigh	Wake	The Triangle	Historic house	Antebellum plantation home
Morehead Planetarium and Science Center	Chapel Hill	Orange	The Triangle	Science	Part of the University of North Carolina at Chapel Hill
Morrow Mountain State Park	Albemarle	Stanly	Metro Charlotte	Local history	Includes museum of local cultural and natural history and a restored historic house
Mountain Farm Museum and Mingus Mill	Cherokee	Swain	Western	Open air	Includes reconstructed late 19th century log farm buildings and a historic corn grist mill
Mountain Heritage Center	Cullowhee	Jackson	Western	Local history	website, part of Western Carolina University, natural and cultural heritage of the southern Appalachian region
Mountain Gateway Museum and Heritage Center	Old Fort	McDowell	Western	Local history	Regional branch of the North Carolina Museum of History, culture and heritage of the southern Appalachians
Mount Airy Museum of Regional History	Mount Airy	Surry	Foothills	Local history	website, Native Americans, pioneers, home life, exhibits on Donna Fargo, Tommy Jarrell, Andy Griffith and Chang and Eng Bunker
Mount Mitchell State Park	Burnsville	Yancey	Western	Multiple	Includes exhibits about the park's natural, cultural and historical heritage
Murfreesboro Historical Association	Murfreesboro	Hertford	Inner Banks	Multiple	Operates the William Rea Museum, Brady C. Jefcoat Museum, tours of the Dr. Walter Reed House, John Wheeler House, shops and the Agriculture and Transportation Museum
Murray's Mill	Newton	Catawba	The Triangle	Mill	Operated by the Catawba County Historical Association
Museum & Archives of Rockingham County	Wentworth	Rockingham	Foothills	Local history	website, operated by the Rockingham County Historical Society
Museum of American Cut & Engraved Glass	Highlands	Macon	Western	Art	Cut and engraved glass primarily from the American Brilliant Period, 1876-1916
Museum of American Pottery	Creedmoor	Granville	The Triangle	Art	Located at Cedar Creek Gallery, works by family and studio potters
Museum of Anthropology at Wake Forest University	Winston-Salem	Forsyth	Piedmont Triad	Anthropology	website, artifacts and art from Americas, Africa, Asia, and Oceania
Museum of Ashe County History	Jefferson	Ashe	Western	Local history	Located in the historic former county courthouse
Museum of Coastal Carolina	Ocean Isle Beach	Brunswick	Lower Cape Fear	Natural history	Natural science, environment, and cultural history of the Coastal Carolina region
Museum of Colerain	Colerain	Bertie	Inner Banks	Local history	
Museum of Early Southern Decorative Arts	Winston-Salem	Forsyth	Piedmont Triad	Decorative arts	Part of Old Salem Museums & Gardens
Museum of Life and Science	Durham	Durham	The Triangle	Science	Formerly North Carolina Museum of Life and Science, science and natural history exhibits
Museum of North Carolina Minerals	Spruce Pine	Mitchell	Western	Natural history	Minerals and gems found in the area and state
Museum of North Carolina Traditional Pottery	Seagrove	Randolph	Piedmont Triad	Art	Features displays from surrounding area potteries
Museum of Old Domestic Life	High Point	Guilford	Piedmont Triad	History	19th-century household items, tools and everyday artifacts from Quaker homes, open by appointment
Museum of the Albemarle	Elizabeth City	Pasquotank	Inner Banks	Local history	Regional branch of the North Carolina Museum of History
Museum of the Cape Fear Historical Complex	Fayetteville	Cumberland	Fayetteville metro area	Local history	Regional branch of the North Carolina Museum of History, also features the 1897 Poe House and Arsenal Park
Museum of the Cherokee Indian	Cherokee	Swain	Western	Native American	website, history and culture of the Cherokee
Museum of the Marine	Jacksonville	Onslow	Inner Banks	Military	Planned museum
Museum of the Southeast American Indian	Pembroke	Robeson	Piedmont	Native American	website, part of the University of North Carolina at Pembroke, prehistory, history, culture, art and contemporary issues of American Indians, with special emphasis on the Robeson County Native American community
Museum of the Waxhaws	Waxhaw	Union	Metro Charlotte	Local history	website, includes exhibits on President Andrew Jackson
Museum of World Cultures	Wilmington	New Hanover	Lower Cape Fear	Art	website, "museum without walls", public display in various buildings at University of North Carolina at Wilmington, includes clothing, textiles, jewelry, pottery, furniture, figures, drawings, photographs, prints and scrolls from all over the world
Mystery Hill	Blowing Rock	Watauga	Western	Multiple	website, includes historic house furnished for turn-of-the-20th-century life, science exhibits, Native American artifacts, and the house
NASCAR Hall of Fame	Charlotte	Mecklenburg	Metro Charlotte	Sports	History and heritage of NASCAR
Nasher Museum of Art	Durham	Durham	The Triangle	Art	Part of Duke University, collections include Medieval art, art of the Americas (largely pre-Columbian), classical antiquities, modern and international contemporary art, with a concentration in art from the African diaspora
National Railroad Museum and Hall of Fame	Hamlet	Richmond	Sandhills	Railroad	Includes railroad artifacts and model train layout
NC Museum of Dolls, Toys & Miniatures	Spencer	Rowan	Metro Charlotte	Toy	website, includes dolls, Tinker Toys, model trains and trucks, dollhouses, miniatures and cap guns
Neal John Deere Tractor Museum	Trinity	Randolph	Piedmont Triad	Agriculture	Located at Linbrook Heritage Estate, includes rare tractors and industrial equipment, John Deere toys and memorabilia, engines, antique electrical apparatus
New Bern Firemen's Museum	New Bern	Craven	Inner Banks	Firefighting	website
New London Museum	New London	Stanly	Metro Charlotte	Local history	
Newbold-White House	Hertford	Perquimans	Inner Banks	Historic house	Colonial Quaker home
New Hope Valley Railway	New Hill	Wake	The Triangle	Railroad	Heritage railway and North Carolina Railway Museum
Neuseway Nature Park	Kinston	Lenoir	Inner Banks	Multiple	Includes the Neuse Planetarium, Health & Science Museum and the Exchange Nature Center
Norlina Train Museum	Norlina	Warren	Piedmont	Railroad	website
North Carolina Auto Racing Hall of Fame	Mooresville	Iredell	Metro Charlotte	Automotive	website, includes over 40 race cars dedicated to all types of auto racing
North Carolina Aviation Museum	Asheboro	Randolph	Piedmont Triad	Aviation	Restored aircraft, models, uniforms, memorabilia
North Carolina Baseball Museum	Wilson	Wilson	Inner Banks	Sports	Located at Fleming Stadium
North Carolina Central University Art Museum	Durham	Durham	The Triangle	Art	website, part of North Carolina Central University, focus is African-American and African art
North Carolina Collection Gallery	Chapel Hill	Orange	The Triangle	History	Part of the Wilson Library at University of North Carolina at Chapel Hill, includes literature, photographs, artifacts about North Carolina history, and three historic rooms with furnishings
North Carolina Cotton Museum	Pikeville	Wayne	Piedmont	Agriculture	Also known as the Northern Wayne Heritage Museum
North Carolina Estuarium	Washington	Beaufort	Inner Banks	Natural history	website, ecology of North Carolina's estuaries, operated by Partnership for the Sounds
North Carolina Maritime Museum	Beaufort	Carteret	Crystal Coast	Maritime	Regional branch of the North Carolina Museum of History
North Carolina Maritime Museum at Southport	Southport	Brunswick	Lower Cape Fear	Maritime	Regional branch of the North Carolina Museum of History
North Carolina Maritime Museum on Roanoke Island	Roanoke Island	Dare	Outer Banks	Maritime	Regional branch of the North Carolina Museum of History, also known as Roanoke Island Maritime Museum
North Carolina Museum of Art	Raleigh	Wake	The Triangle	Art	Collection includes European paintings from the Renaissance to the 19th century, Egyptian funerary art, sculpture and vase painting from ancient Greece and Rome, American art of the 18th through 20th centuries, international contemporary art, African, ancient American, pre-Columbian, and Oceanic art, and Jewish ceremonial objects
North Carolina Museum of History	Raleigh	Wake	The Triangle	History	Exhibits include state's military history, decorative arts, the North Carolina Sports Hall of Fame, transportation and changing exhibits of state history and culture
North Carolina Museum of Natural Sciences	Raleigh	Wake	The Triangle	Natural history	Themes include dinosaurs, health and medicine, animals, fish, habitats, water, minerals, climate and weather, science, live animals
North Carolina Museum of Natural Sciences at Whiteville	Whiteville	Columbus	Piedmont	Natural history	Natural history and cultural heritage of our forests and forestry, formerly known as the North Carolina Museum of Forestry
North Carolina Music Hall of Fame	Kannapolis	Cabarrus	Metro Charlotte	Music	Located at the Curb Museum, honors state performers and non-performers in the music industry
North Carolina Pottery Center	Seagrove	Randolph	Piedmont Triad	Art	website
North Carolina School for the Deaf Historical Museum	Morganton	Burke	Western	Education	History of the school
North Carolina State Capitol	Raleigh	Wake	The Triangle	Historic site	
North Carolina Transportation Museum	Spencer	Rowan	Metro Charlotte	Transportation	Railroad, aviation and automobiles
North Carolina Wesleyan College Galleries	Rocky Mount	Nash	The Triangle	Art	Includes the Mims Gallery and Four Sisters Gallery
Northampton County Museum	Jackson	Northampton	Inner Banks	Local history	
Norwood Museum	Norwood	Stanly	Metro Charlotte	Local history	
Oak Island Light	Caswell Beach	Brunswick	Lower Cape Fear	Maritime	Lighthouse open for tour
Oakboro Railroad Museum	Oakboro	Stanly	Metro Charlotte	Railroad	
Oakboro Regional Museum of History	Oakboro	Stanly	Metro Charlotte	Local history	
Oconaluftee Indian Village	Cherokee	Swain	Western	Native American	Replica of an 18th-century eastern Cherokee community
Ocracoke Museum	Ocracoke	Hyde	Outer Banks	Multiple	website, operated by the Ocracoke Preservation Society in the David Williams House, local history, period displays, art exhibits, duck decoys, fishing, boat and lighthouse models
Old Baldy Lighthouse & Smith Island Museum of History	Bald Head Island	Brunswick	Lower Cape Fear	Maritime	Reconstructed lighthouse keeper's quarters and local history museum, and tours of lighthouse
Old Bridge Preservation Society Museum	Sunset Beach	Brunswick	Lower Cape Fear	Transportation	website, preserved swing bridge and tender house, and museum about its history and area transportation
Old Brunswick County Jail	Southport	Brunswick	Lower Cape Fear	Prison	website, operated by the Southport Historical Society
Old City Jail	Mount Airy	Surry	Foothills	Media	Re-creation of "The Courthouse" from the Andy Griffith Show
Old Fort Railroad Museum	Old Fort	McDowell	Western	Railroad	Historic depot with railroad displays and visitor center
Old Jail Museum	Taylorsville	Alexander	Western	Prison	
Old Rock School Railway Museum	Valdese	Burke	Western	Railroad	Also known as the Piedmont & Western Railroad Museum, includes model train layouts and railroad memorabilia, operated by the Piedmont and Western Railroad Club
Old Salem Museums & Gardens	Winston-Salem	Forsyth	Piedmont Triad	Living	18th and 19th century Moravian village
Old Salem Toy Museum	Winston-Salem	Forsyth	Piedmont Triad	Toy	Part of Old Salem Museums & Gardens, includes toys, dolls, teddy bears, puppets, doll houses, toy zoos, automobiles and planes
Old Waynesborough Park	Goldsboro	Wayne	Piedmont	Open air	website, includes nine historic buildings
Oliver Nestus Freeman Roundhouse Museum	Wilson	Wilson	Inner Banks	African American	website, contributions of local African Americans
Onslow County Museum	Richlands	Onslow	Inner Banks	Local history	website, features area fossils
Orange County History Museum	Hillsborough	Orange	The Triangle	Local history	website
Oriental's History Museum	Oriental	Pamlico	Inner Banks	Local history	
Orton Plantation	Smithville Township	Brunswick	Lower Cape Fear	Historic house	Southern plantation, outbuildings and gardens
Outer Banks Center for Wildlife Education	Corolla	Currituck	Outer Banks	Natural history	website, coastal North Carolina's wildlife, natural history and cultural heritage, operated by the N.C. Wildlife Resources Commission
Outer Banks Beachcomber Museum	Nags Head	Dare	Outer Banks	Natural history	Collection of beach glass, feathers, shells, sand, bricks and bottles, located in a historic store
Outer Banks History Center	Manteo	Dare	Outer Banks	Local history	website, regional archives with changing exhibits
Page-Walker Arts & History Center	Cary	Wake	The Triangle	Multiple	Local history and changing art exhibits
Palmer-Marsh House	Bath	Beaufort	Inner Banks	Historic house	1744 home
Pamlico County History Museum	Grantsboro	Pamlico	Inner Banks	Open air	website, heritage village, operated by the Pamlico County Historical Association
Pantego Academy Historical Museum	Pantego	Beaufort	Inner Banks	Local history	
Pender County Museum	Burgaw	Pender	Lower Cape Fear	Local history	website
Penderlea Homestead Museum	Burgaw	Pender	Lower Cape Fear	Historic house	website, homestead community farm of the Depression era
Penland School of Crafts	Spruce Pine	Mitchell	Western	Art	Includes exhibit gallery
Person County Museum of History	Roxboro	Person	Piedmont	Open air	Complex includes a local history museum in the Governor W. W. Kitchin House, the Male Academy/Parsonage, Woodsdale General Store, Dr. John H. Merritt's office, a tobacco barn, and the Van Hook Subscription School
Pisgah Center for Wildlife Education	Pisgah Forest	Transylvania	Western	Natural history	website, mountain wildlife and habitats, freshwater fish, operated by the N.C. Wildlife Resources Commission
Polk County History Museum	Columbus	Polk	Western	Local history	
Poplar Grove Plantation	Wilmington	Pender	Lower Cape Fear	Historic house	19th century plantation homestead and outbuildings
Pope House Museum	Raleigh	Wake	The Triangle	Historic house	
Port Discover	Elizabeth City	Pasquotank	Inner Banks	Science	website
Port O' Plymouth Museum	Plymouth	Washington	Inner Banks	Civil War	Located in a restored depot, Civil War military artifacts
President James K. Polk State Historic Site	Pineville	Mecklenburg	Metro Charlotte	Biographical	Includes visitor center with exhibits about James K. Polk, reconstructions of an early 19th-century log house, separate kitchen and barn
Presidential Culinary Museum	Grover	Cleveland	Metro Charlotte	History	website, memorabilia from White House chefs, located at the Inn of the Patriots
Raeford-Hoke Museum	Raeford	Hoke	Sandhills	Local history	website, located in the McLauchlin-McFadyen House, also includes "The Parker-Ray House," an emergency service museum, doll house, school house, and country store
Railroad House	Sanford	Lee	Piedmont	Local history	Late 19th-century house with local history displays
Raleigh Fire Museum	Raleigh	Wake	The Triangle	Firefighting	Open on the second Saturday of each month
Rankin Museum of American Heritage	Ellerbe	Richmond	Sandhills	Multiple	website, natural history, paleontology, local history, Native American artifacts
Red Barn Mountain Museum	Waynesville	Haywood	Western	Local history	History of area rural mountain life
Red Springs Museum	Red Springs	Robeson	Piedmont	Local history	
Reed Gold Mine	Midland	Cabarrus	Metro Charlotte	Mining	Gold mining museum and tunnels
Reynolda House Museum of American Art	Winston-Salem	Forsyth	Piedmont Triad	Art	American art from colonial era to the present
Richard Childress Racing Museum	Welcome	Davidson	Piedmont Triad	Automotive	website, includes over 50 cars of Richard Childress Racing
Richard Gwyn Museum	Elkin	Surry	Foothills	Local history	Operated by the Jonathan Hunt Chapter of the D.A.R., includes farm tools, domestic artifactsinformation
Richard Petty Museum	Randleman	Randolph	Piedmont	Automotive	Race car driver Richard Petty and vintage cars
Richmond-Miles History Museum	Yanceyville	Caswell	Piedmont Triad	Local history	website, located in the Graves-Florance-Gatewood House, operated by the Caswell County Historical Association
Right Track Toy Train Museum	Lake Lure	Rutherford	Western	Toy	Model trains from the early 1900s to the present
Roanoke Canal Museum	Roanoke Rapids	Halifax	Inner Banks	Transportation	website, history of the Roanoke River Valley, the engineering feats of the Roanoke Canal and its later use as a source of hydroelectric power
Roanoke/Cashie River Center	Windsor	Bertie	Inner Banks	Natural history	website, operated by the Partnership for the Sounds, exhibits about wildlife, migratory songbirds, traditional fisheries like river herring and shad, display about the Battle of Windsor
Roanoke Island Festival Park	Manteo	Dare	Outer Banks	Multiple	Includes a museum ship, colonial and Native American living history site, local history museum, art exhibits
Robeson County History Museum	Lumberton	Robeson	Piedmont	Local history	website
Rock School Art Galleries	Valdese	Burke	Western	Art	Community art galleries, operated by the Rock School Arts Foundation
Rocky Mount Fire Museum	Rocky Mount	Nash	The Triangle	Firefighting	
Rosetta C. Baldwin Museum	High Point	Guilford	Piedmont Triad	African American	Contributions of African Americans in local history
Rowan Museum	Salisbury	Rowan	Metro Charlotte	History	Includes local history museum in a historic courthouse, the Old Stone House and the Utzman Chambers House
Ruby City Gems & Minerals	Franklin	Macon	Western	Natural history	website, store with museum display of gems, minerals and fossils, Native American and pre-Columbian artifacts
Rural Hall Depot	Rural Hall	Forsyth	Piedmont Triad	Railroad	Open for special events
Rural Hill Farm	Huntersville	Mecklenburg	Metro Charlotte	Open air	website, includes 265-acre (1.07 km^{2}) historic farm with eight historic structures and three reproductions
Rural Heritage Museum	Mars Hill	Madison	Western	History	Part of Mars Hill University in Montague Hall, Southern Appalachian mountain culture and history
Rush Wray Museum of Yancey County History	Burnsville	Yancey	Western	Local history	Located in the McElroy House, include period furniture and local history exhibits
Rutherford County Farm Museum	Forest City	Rutherford	Western	Agriculture	Antique farm and home equipment
Rutherford Hospital Museum	Rutherfordton	Rutherford	Western	Medical	Historic medical equipment and hospital history
Sam Bass Gallery	Concord	Cabarrus	Metro Charlotte	Art	website, motorsports art by Sam Bass
Sampson County History Museum	Clinton	Sampson	Coastal Plain	Local history	website
Schiele Museum of Natural History	Gastonia	Gaston	Metro Charlotte	Natural history	website
SciWorks	Winston-Salem	Forsyth	Piedmont Triad	Science	Science and natural history
Scottish Heritage Center	Laurinburg	Scotland	Sandhills	Ethnic	website, part of the library of St. Andrews University, includes exhibits about the Scottish settlement of southeastern North Carolina
Scottish Tartans Museum	Franklin	Macon	Western	Ethnic	website, history of tartans, Scottish history, culture, dress, migration and military
Second Ward Alumni House Museum	Charlotte	Mecklenburg	Metro Charlotte	African American	Memorabilia of Second Ward High School and other Charlotte neighborhoods that were home to the black community
Sechrest Gallery	High Point	Guilford	Piedmont Triad	Art	Part of High Point University
Senator Sam J. Ervin Jr. Library and Museum	Morganton	Burke	Western	Biographical	website, life, memorabilia and papers of Sam J. Ervin Jr., located on the campus of Western Piedmont Community College
Shaw House Properties	Southern Pines	Moore	Sandhills	Historic house	website, operated by the Moore County Historical Association, includes the antebellum Shaw House, Garner House and Britt Sanders Cabin
Shelton House	Waynesville	Haywood	Western	Historic house	Includes decorative arts, handicrafts and furniture created by North Carolina artists
Shook Museum	Clyde	Haywood	Western	Historic house	Located in the Shook-Welch-Smathers House
Smith-McDowell House	Asheville	Buncombe	Western	Historic house	Victorian mansion and history exhibits
Smoky Mountain Trains	Bryson City	Swain	Western	Railroad	Operated by the Great Smoky Mountains Railroad, features Lionel model train engines, cars and accessories, large model train layout
Somerset Place	Creswell	Washington	Inner Banks	Open air	1830 antebellum plantation and outbuildings
Southeastern Center for Contemporary Art	Winston-Salem	Forsyth	Piedmont Triad	Art	Contemporary art gallery
Southern Appalachian Radio Museum	Asheville	Buncombe	Western	Technology	website, antique radios, equipment and history, located on the campus of the Asheville–Buncombe Technical Community College
Spring Hope Historical Museum	Spring Hope	Nash	The Triangle	Local history	
St. James Place Museum	Robersonville	Martin	Inner Banks	Decorative arts	Includes original furnishings, southern folk art, antique duck decoys, quilts
St. Paul Museum	Randleman	Randolph	Piedmont Triad	Local history	Located in the St. Paul Methodist Episcopal Church, operated by the North Randolph Historical Society
Stanly County Museum	Albemarle	Stanly	Metro Charlotte	Multiple	Includes local history exhibits, 1840s period Freeman-Marks House, 19th century I.W. Snuggs House
START Gallery	Winston-Salem	Forsyth	Piedmont Triad	Art	Part of Wake Forest University, student art gallery
Stokes County Historical Museum	Danbury	Stokes	Foothills	Local history	website, located in the 1859 Wilson Fulton House, antique furniture and decorative items
Stone Mountain State Park	Wilkesboro	Wilkes	Western	Multiple	Includes Mountain Culture Exhibit and mid-19th century Hutchinson Homestead
Stonewall Manor	Rocky Mount	Nash	The Triangle	Historic house	website, antebellum plantation home
Swain County Heritage Museum	Bryson City	Swain	Western	Local history	Located in the Swain County Courthouse
Swannanoa Valley Museum	Black Mountain	Buncombe	Western	Local history	website
Tannenbaum Historic Park	Greensboro	Guilford	Piedmont Triad	Open air	Includes Colonial Heritage Center, 1813 Hoskins House, restored 1830s barn, a replica kitchen and blacksmith shop; adjacent to the Guilford Courthouse National Military Park
Tarkil Branch Farm's Homestead Museum	Beulaville	Duplin	Piedmont	Open air	website, 19th century homestead, includes 1830s Dogtrot house, smokehouse, tobacco barn, corn cribs, chicken house and other structures with exhibits
Teach's Hole Blackbeard Exhibit and Pirate Specialty Shop	Ocracoke	Hyde	Outer Banks	History	website, shop and exhibit about Blackbeard and pirates
Textile Heritage Center at Cooleemee	Cooleemee	Davie	Piedmont	Industry	Located in the Zachary House, history of the area textile industry, includes nearby Mill House Museum, set up for a typical mill worker's family
Textile Heritage Museum	Glencoe	Alamance	Piedmont	Industry	website, features history and machinery of the textile industry, textile history of Alamance County, the Piedmont, and beyond
Theatre Art Galleries	High Point	Guilford	Piedmont Triad	Art	website
Things From Yesteryear Museum	Pollocksville	Lenoir	Inner Banks	History	Open by appointment, includes antique appliances, cars, typewriters, cameras, medical equipment and Fostoria glassware
Thomas Wolfe House	Asheville	Buncombe	Western	Historic house	Victorian boyhood home of author Thomas Wolfe
Thomasville Railroad Passenger Depot	Thomasville	Davidson	Metro Charlotte	Local history	
Tobacco Farm Life Museum	Kenly	Johnston	Inner Banks	Agriculture	website
Town Creek Indian Mound	Mount Gilead	Montgomery	Sandhills	Archaeology	Historic Pee Dee ceremonial mound with visitor center, two temples, a burial house, palisade wall and residence
Trail of Faith	Valdese	Burke	Western	Open air	website, fifteen open-air exhibits and replicas that trace the history of the Waldensians, a Christian spiritual movement
Transylvania Heritage Museum	Brevard	Transylvania	Western	Local history	website
Tryon Arts & Crafts School	Tryon	Polk	Western	Art	website, exhibits include student work and area artists
Tryon Palace Historic Site & Gardens	New Bern	Craven	Inner Banks	Historic house	Modern reconstruction of the historical colonial governors' mansion of the Province of North Carolina
Turchin Center for the Visual Arts	Boone	Watauga	Western	Art	website, operated by Appalachian State University
Twin County Museum and Hall of Fame	Rocky Mount	Nash	The Triangle	Local history	History, culture, people, and accomplishments of Nash and Edgecombe Counties, located inside the train station
UNC Charlotte Galleries	Charlotte	Mecklenburg	Metro Charlotte	Art	Two major exhibition spaces on the university's main campus and a gallery in the UNC Charlotte Center City building
University of North Carolina at Asheville Galleries	Asheville	Buncombe	Western	Art	Includes Blowers Gallery at the Ramsey Library, S. Tucker Cooke Gallery in Owen Hall, Highsmith Art and Intercultural Gallery
USS North Carolina Battleship Memorial	Wilmington	New Hanover	Lower Cape Fear	Maritime	World War II battleship
Vance Birthplace	Weaverville	Buncombe	Western	Historic house	Reconstructed late 18th century log house and farmstead outbuildings, birthplace of Governor Zebulon Baird Vance
Vance County Historical Museum	Henderson	Vance	Western	Local history	
Van Every/Smith Galleries	Davidson	Davidson	Metro Charlotte	Art	website, part of Davidson College in the Belk Visual Art Center
Vollis Simpson Whirligig Park	Wilson	Wilson	Inner Banks	Art	Sculpture park and museum
Wake Forest Historical Museum	Wake Forest	Wake	The Triangle	Local history	website, includes Calvin Jones House and museum of history of Wake Forest College and local history
Waldensian Heritage Museum	Valdese	Burke	Western	Religious	website, history of the Waldensians, a Christian spiritual movement, operated by the Waldensian Presbyterian Church
Walter L. Stasavich Science and Nature Center	Greenville	Pitt	Inner Banks	Natural history	Located in River Park North, includes an aquarium, live animals, wildlife dioramas, shells
Waterworks Visual Arts Center	Salisbury	Rowan	Metro Charlotte	Art	website
Wayne County Museum	Goldsboro	Wayne	Piedmont	Local history	website
Weatherspoon Art Museum	Greensboro	Guilford	Piedmont Triad	Art	Part of University of North Carolina at Greensboro, modern and contemporary art
Weizenblatt Gallery	Mars Hill	Madison	Western	Art	Part of Mars Hill University
Welcome Home Veterans Living Military Museum	Mooresville	Iredell	Metro Charlotte	Local history	website, located in Richard's Coffee Shop, includes photos, paintings, memorabilia
Wells Fargo History Museum	Charlotte	Mecklenburg	Metro Charlotte	History	Company history, gold mining, 19th-century stagecoach, bank branch model, coins
Wellington B. Gray Gallery	Greenville	Pitt	Inner Banks	Art	Part of East Carolina University in the Jenkins Fine Arts Center
Western Carolina University Fine Art Museum	Cullowhee	Jackson	Western	Art	website, contemporary art, part of Western Carolina University in the John W. Bardo Fine & Performing Arts Center
Western North Carolina Air Museum	Hendersonville	Henderson	Western	Aviation	website, historic aircraft and memorabilia
West Point Mill	Durham	Durham	The Triangle	Mill	Reconstructed working grist mill, located in West Point on the Eno park
Weymouth Woods-Sandhills Nature Preserve	Southern Pines	Moore	Sandhills	Natural history	Longleaf pine forest, including geology, plants, animals and the use of prescribed fires
Whalehead Club	Corolla	Currituck	Outer Banks	Historic house	1925 Art Nouveau mansion
Wheels Through Time Museum	Maggie Valley	Haywood	Western	Motorcycle	website, over 300 historic American motorcycles
Whippoorwill Academy and Village	Ferguson	Wilkes	Western	Open air	website, includes Tom Dooley Museum, Daniel Boone replica cabin, an art gallery, store, jail, schoolhouse, chapel
Whistlestop Exhibit at Company Shops Station	Burlington	Alamance	Piedmont Triad	Railroad	History of the North Carolina Railroad Company
Wilbur A. Tyndall Tractor Museum	Pink Hill	Lenoir	Inner Banks	Agriculture	Open by appointment, tractors, farm equipment and implements, advertisements, signs, agriculture and rural life memorabilia
Wilderness Taxidermy and Wildlife Museum	Franklin	Macon	Western	Natural history	Collection of taxidermied animals from around the world
Wilkes Art Gallery	North Wilkesboro	Wilkes	Piedmont Triad	Art	website
Wilkes Heritage Museum	Wilkesboro	Wilkes	Western	Multiple	Includes tours of the Old Wilkes Jail, Robert Cleveland Log House, and exhibits about early settlement, military history, industry, agriculture, medicine, communication, education, entertainment, and transportation
Wilmington Railroad Museum	Wilmington	New Hanover	Lower Cape Fear	Railroad	website
Wilson Arts Center	Wilson	Wilson	Inner Banks	Art	website
World Methodist Museum	Lake Junaluska	Haywood	Western	Religious	website, history of the Wesleyan movement
Wright Brothers National Memorial	Kill Devil Hills	Dare	Outer Banks	Aviation	Includes museum, test site with outdoor displays and monument
Wright Tavern	Wentworth	Rockingham	Foothills	Historic site	Open by appointment with the Rockingham County Historical Society
Wrightsville Beach Museum of History	Wrightsville Beach	New Hanover	Lower Cape Fear	Local history	website
YMI Cultural Center	Asheville	Buncombe	Western	African American	website
Zachary-Tolbert House	Cashiers	Jackson	Western	Historic house	Operated by the Cashiers Historical Society, features a collection of hand-crafted 'plain-style' furniture

== Defunct museums ==
- Appalachian Cultural Museum, Boone, part of Appalachian State University, exhibits closed in 2006 but remain online
- Chapel Hill Museum, Chapel Hill, closed in 2010
- Charlotte Trolley Museum, Charlotte
- Charlotte-Mecklenburg Fire Education Center and Museum, Charlotte, closed in 2009
- Cleveland County Historical Museum, Shelby, closed in 2012, site now home to the Earl Scruggs Center
- Doll & Miniature Museum of High Point, closed in 2012
- Fayetteville Museum of Art, Fayetteville, closed in 2010
- Grimes Mill, Salisbury, destroyed by fire in 2013
- Health Adventure, Asheville, closed in 2013
- LATIBAH Collard Green Museum, Charlotte, closed in 2015, currently no physical site
- Latta House, Raleigh, destroyed by fire in 2007
- Maimy Etta Black Fine Arts Museum and Historical Society, Forest City, destroyed by fire, March 2009, "WNC Profile: Mamie Thompson Gumbs", WNC Magazine, January 2009, NC ECHO museum information and photos
- Mountain Farm & Home Museum, Hendersonville
- Sparta Teapot Museum of Craft and Design, Sparta, closed in 2010

== See also ==
- Aquaria in North Carolina (category)
- List of historical societies in North Carolina
- List of museums in the United States
- List of nature centers in North Carolina
- Observatories in North Carolina (category)

== Resources ==
- North Carolina Museums Council
- North Carolina Exploring Cultural Heritage Online - includes listings and photos of NC museums
- Learn NC
