= Augen =

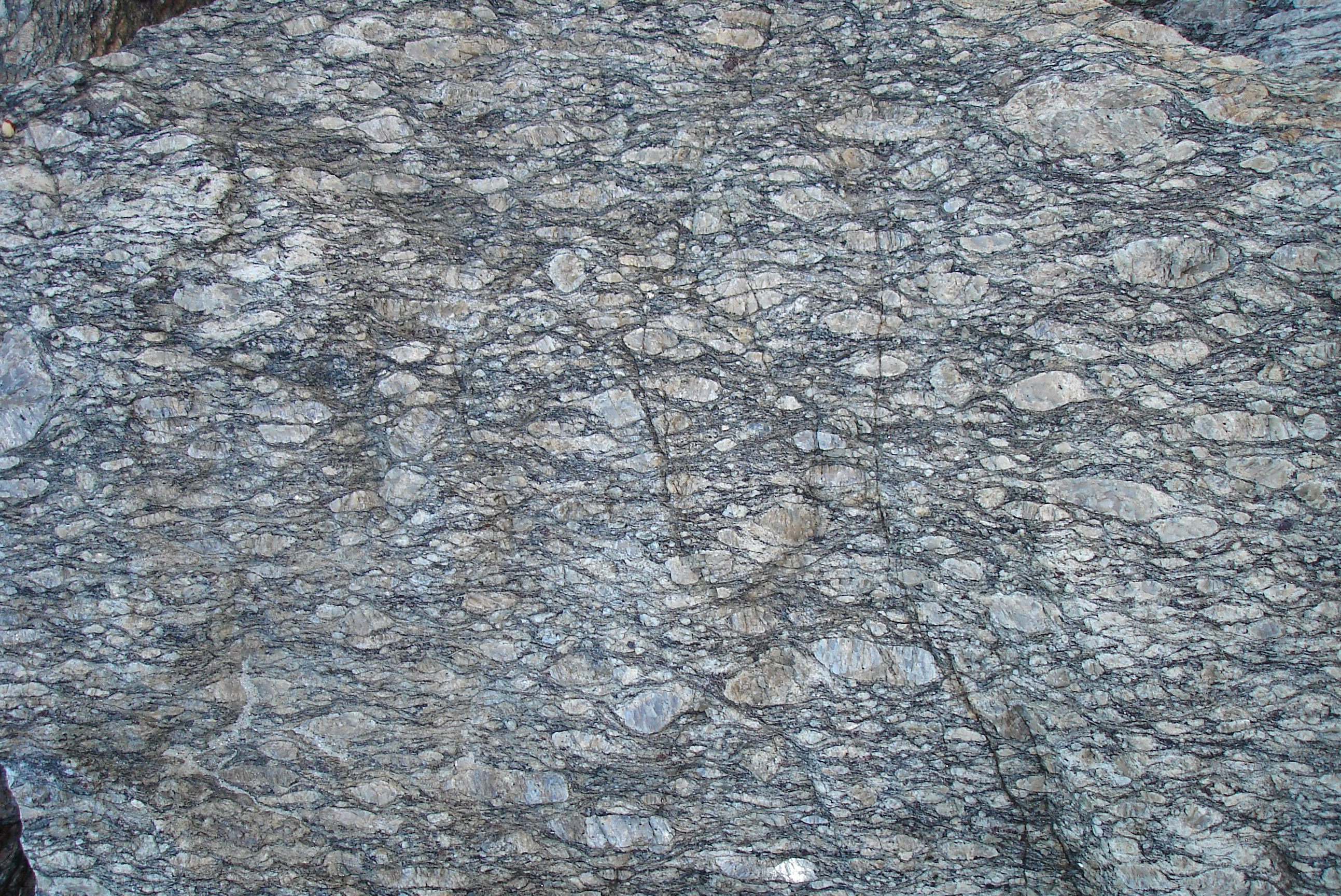
Gneiss with large eye-shaped feldspars

Augen (from German "eyes") are large, lenticular eye-shaped mineral grains or mineral aggregates visible in some foliated metamorphic rocks. In cross section they have the shape of an eye.

Feldspar, quartz, and garnet are common minerals which form augen.

Augen form in rocks which have undergone metamorphism and shearing. The core of the augen is a porphyroblast or porphyroclast of a hard, resilient mineral such as garnet. The augen grows by crystallisation of a mantle of new mineral around the porphyroblast. The mantle is formed contiguous with the foliation which is imparted upon the rock, and forms a blanket which tapers off from either side of the porphyroblast within the strain shadows.

During shearing, the porphyroblast may rotate, to form a characteristic augen texture of asymmetric shearing. In this case, the position of the tails is unequal across the foliation, with some augen showing clear drag folding of the mantle into the strain shadow. This derives a form of shear direction information.

A metamorphic rock which is clotted with augen is often called an augen gneiss. A long wall of this augen gneiss can be felt at the Mineral and Lapidary Museum of Western North Carolina.

== See also ==
- Foliation (geology)
- Gneiss
- Rock microstructure
- Schist
- Shear (geology)

== Bibliography ==
- Best, Myron G. (2013). Igneous and Metamorphic Petrology. John Wiley & Sons. ISBN 978-1-118-68538-9.
- Bucher, Kurt (2023). Petrogenesis of Metamorphic Rocks. Springer Nature. ISBN 978-3-031-12595-9.
