= List of historical societies in North Carolina =

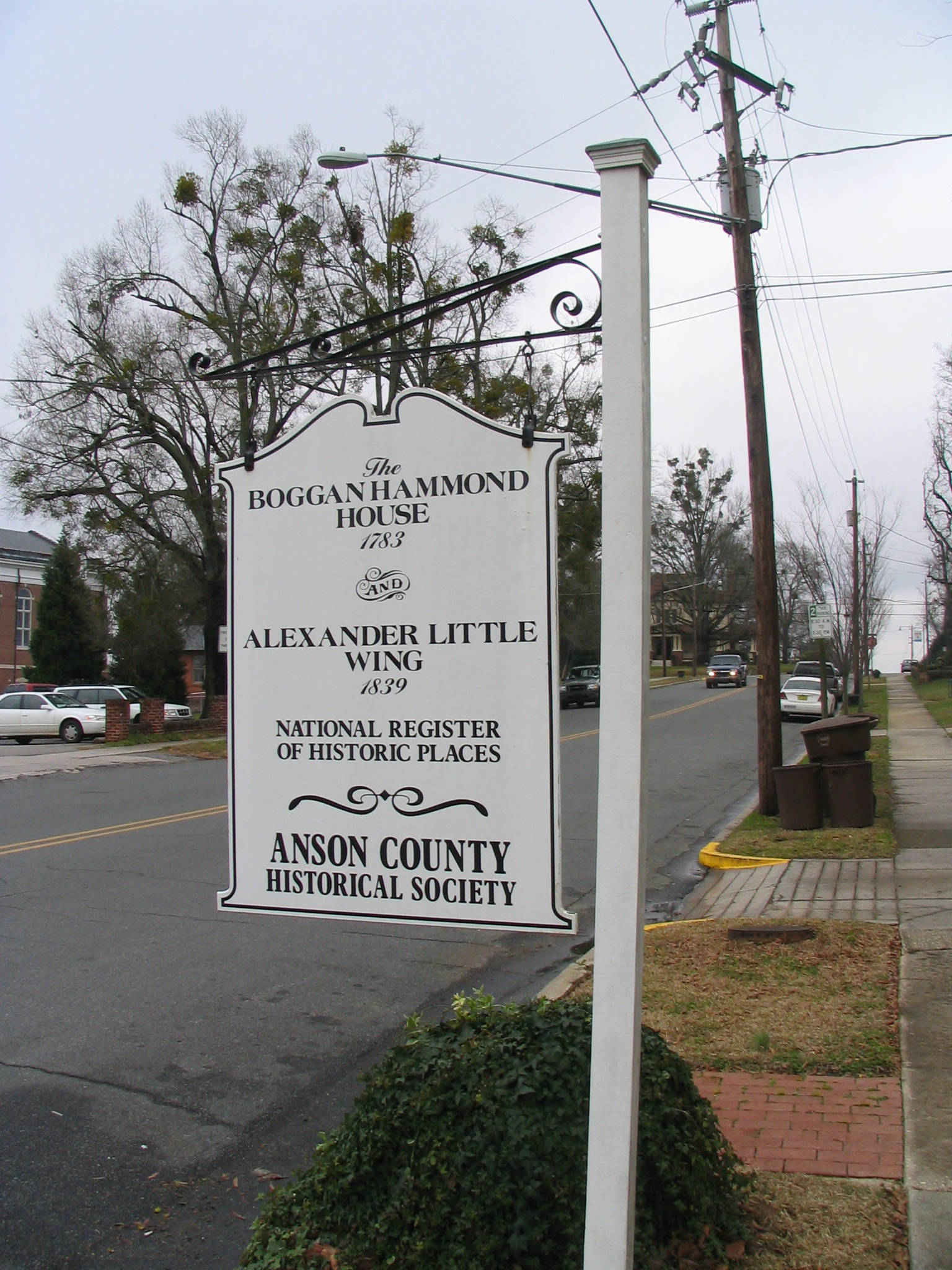
Sign of the Anson County Historical Society in North Carolina (photo 2001)

The following is a list of historical societies in the state of North Carolina, United States.

== Organizations ==
- Alliance for Historic Hillsborough
- Anson County Historical Society
- Beaufort Historical Association
- Bessemer City History & Arts Society
- Blowing Rock Historical Society
- Carteret County Historical Society
- Chapel Hill Historical Society
- Chatham County Historical Association
- Clemmons Historical Society
- Eastern Cabarrus Historical Society
- Friends of the Page-Walker Hotel, Cary
- Gates County Historical Society
- Henderson County Genealogical & Historical Society
- High Point Historical Society
- Highlands Historical Society, North Carolina
- Historic Cabarrus Association
- Historical Association of Catawba County
- Historical Foundation of Hillsborough and Orange County
- The Historical Society of North Carolina, Chapel Hill
- Lawndale Historical Society
- Lincoln County Historical Association, North Carolina
- Lower Cape Fear Historical Society
- Macon County Historical Society
- Martin County Historical Society
- Mecklenburg Historical Association
- Mitchell County Historical Society
- Moore County Historical Association
- Murfreesboro Historical Association
- New Bern Historical Society Foundation
- North Carolina Literary and Historical Society
- Onslow County Historical Society
- Pitt County Historical Society, Inc.
- Polk County Historical Association , Polk County, NC
- Roanoke Island Historical Association
- Rockingham County Historical Society Museum and Archives
- Southport Historical Society
- Stanly County Historical Society
- Stokes County Historical Society
- Tryon Historical Museum , Tryon, NC
- Wachovia Historical Society
- Wake County Historical Society
- Wake Forest Historical Museum
- Wayne County Historical Association
- Wendell Historical Society
- Western North Carolina Historical Association

== See also ==
- History of North Carolina
- List of museums in North Carolina
- National Register of Historic Places listings in North Carolina
- List of historical societies in the United States
