= Mineral and Lapidary Museum =

Museum in Hendersonville, North Carolina, United States

Coordinates: 35.3169°N 82.4598°W

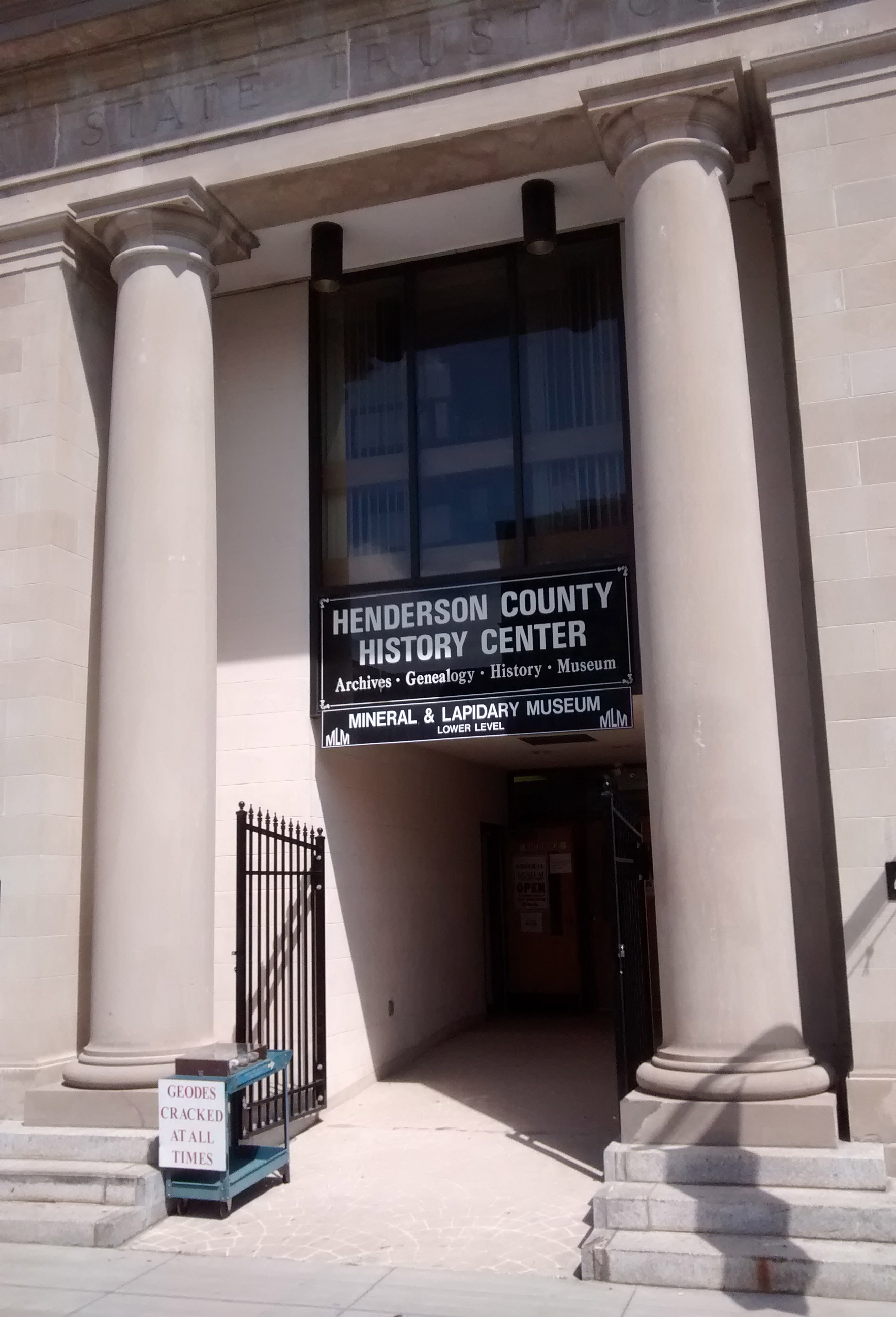

The Mineral and Lapidary Museum of Henderson County is a non-profit, volunteer-run museum in Hendersonville, North Carolina, United States, founded in 1997 at 400 North Main Street in the middle of the city's Historic District.

== Exhibits ==
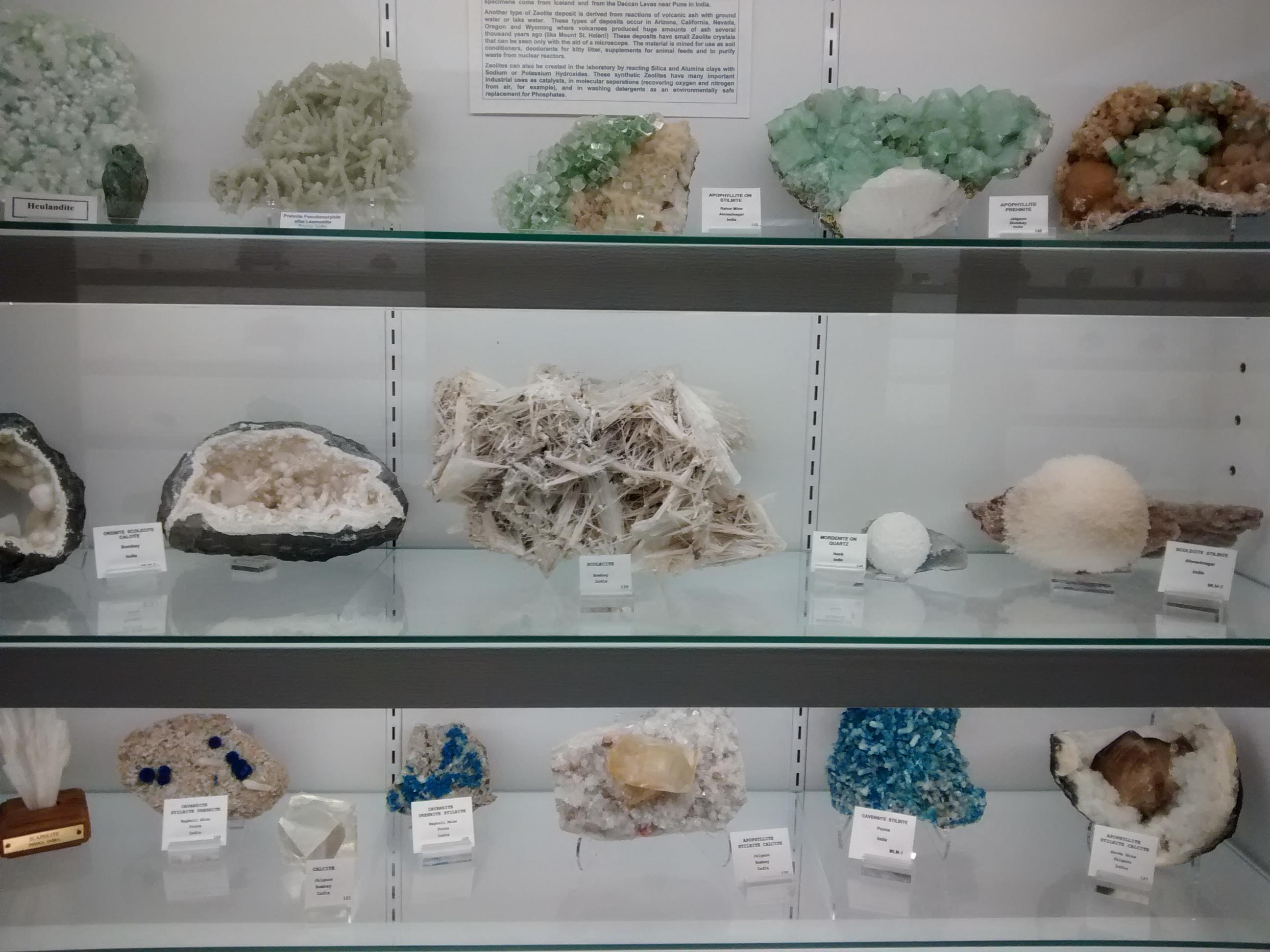
Items on display

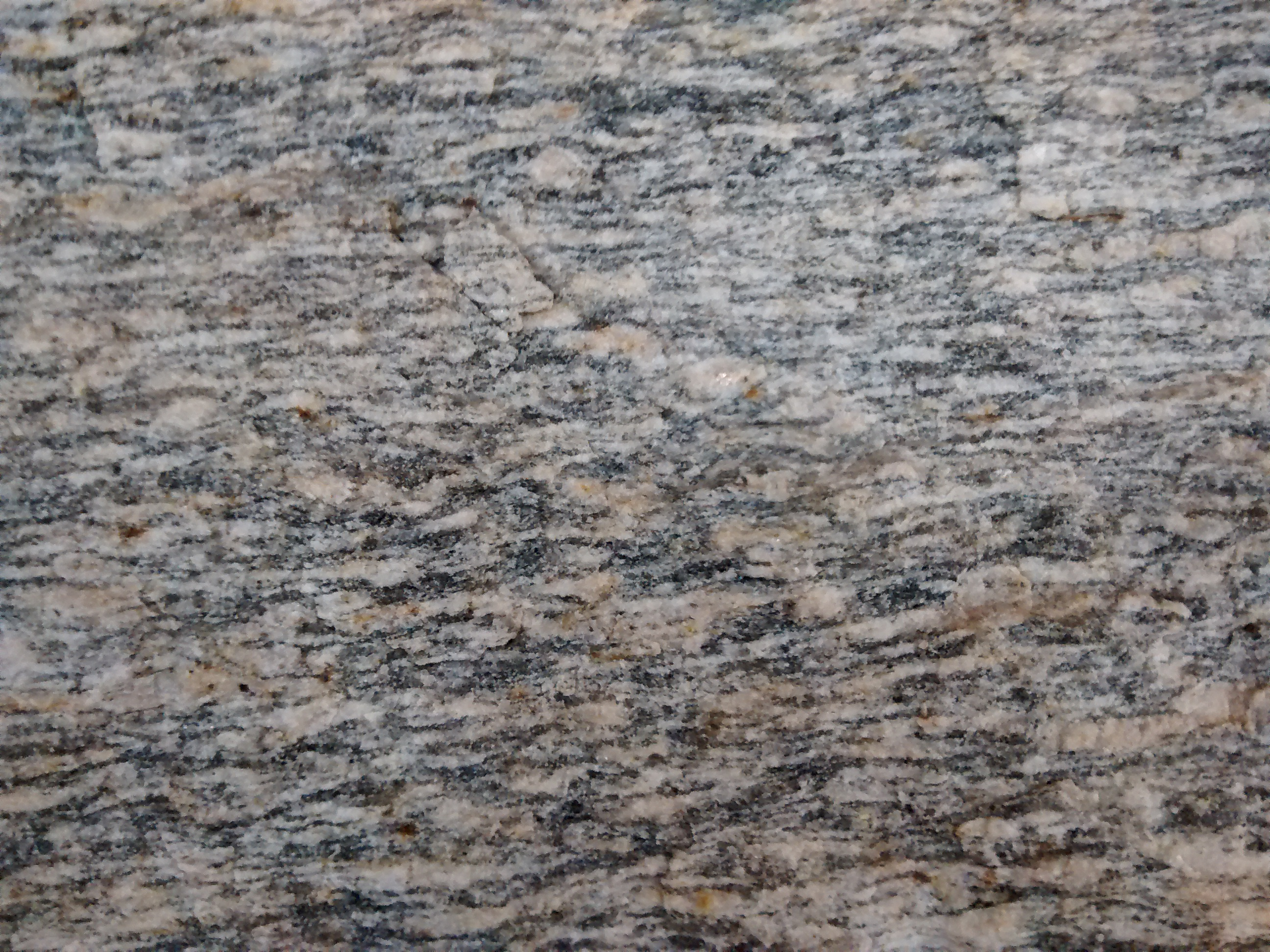
Henderson Augen Gneiss in the museum

The AAA boasts that the petrology and natural history museum features a variety of "gems, minerals, geodes and fossils from around the world." The regional exhibits include dozens of stone and mineral specimens from North Carolina, and a long wall of local Henderson Augen Gneiss.

A six-foot-tall purple amethyst geode from Brazil is the largest geode on display. Another exhibit features more than two dozen pairs of colorful quartz and calcite geodes from Mexico. A mineralology exhibit presents three dozen fluorescent minerals, such as fluorite, opal, willemite, calcite, ruby and sodalite. Among the gemstones exhibited are four replica versions of the Hope Diamond, including a reproduction of the large 18th-century French Blue Diamond.

Chunks of the 1901 Hendersonville iron-nickel meteorite are on display. The museum also displays local Native American archeological artifacts.

The Mineral and Lapidary Museum has a replica Tyrannosaurus rex skull as well as a skull of a Smilodon, the big sabre-tooth cat.

== See also ==
- List of museums in North Carolina
