= Hatteras Histories and Mysteries Museum =

The Hatteras Histories and Mysteries Museum focuses on the possible fate of the inhabitants of the Roanoke Colony, who disappeared around 1587. Located in Buxton, North Carolina, the privately owned museum was opened in April 2010 by Scott Dawson, a historian and author of the 2009 book Croatoan: Birthplace of America.

The museum displays 16th century artifacts discovered in 2010 archaeological digs conducted on Hatteras Island, where Dawson theorizes the colonists may have resettled. The museum also displays artifacts from the American Civil War battles at nearby Hatteras Village and Rodanthe in 1861.
