= Rosedale (Charlotte, North Carolina) =

Historic house in North Carolina, United States

- U.S. National Register of Historic Places
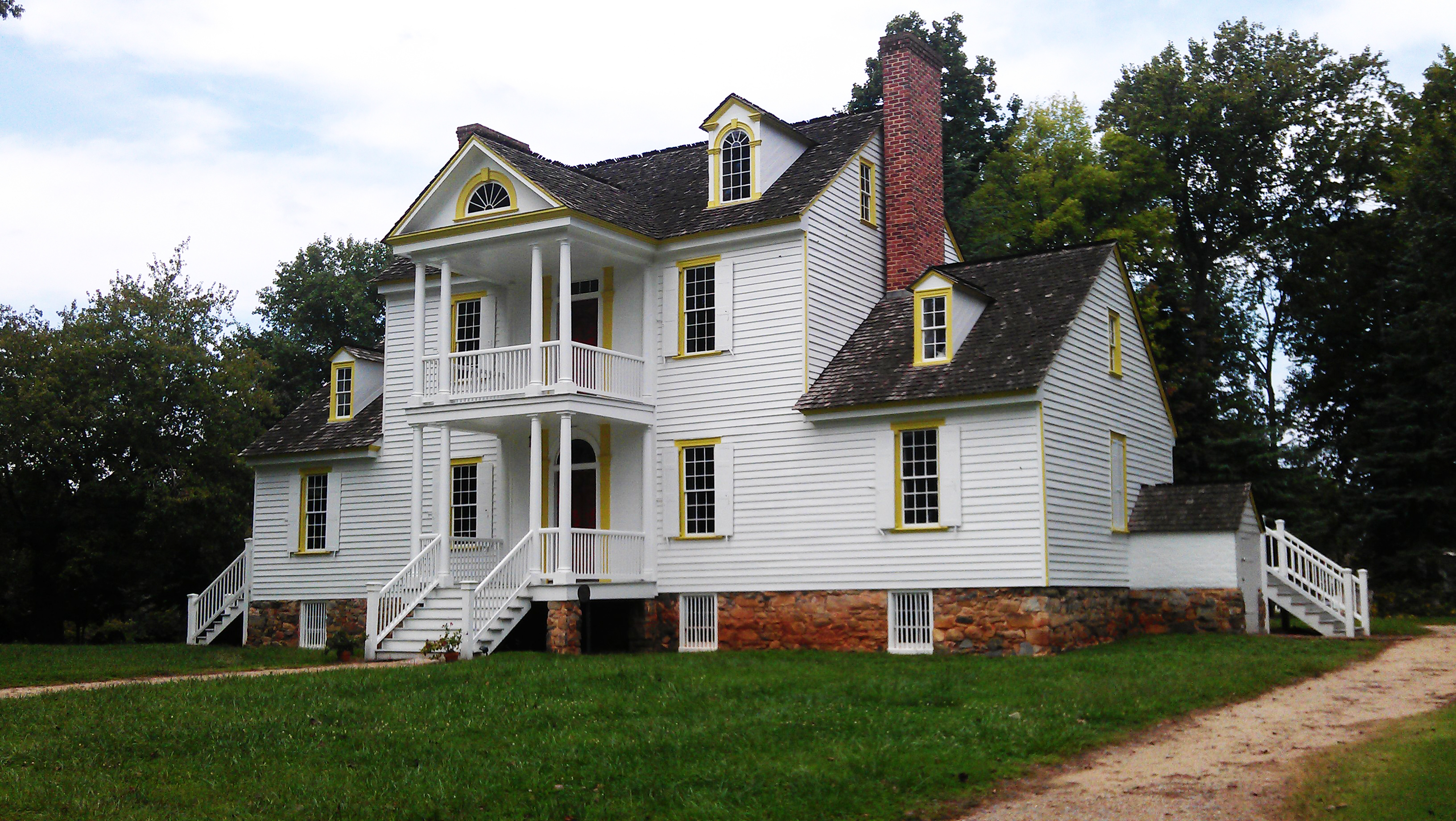
- Rosedale Plantation House, August 2012

- Location within North Carolina Location within the United States
- Location: 3427 N. Tryon St., Charlotte, North Carolina
- Coordinates: 35°15′26″N 80°47′36″W
- Area: 0.8 acres (0.32 ha)
- Built: c. 1807
- Architect: Frew, Archibald
- Architectural style: Federal, Federal Plantation House
- NRHP reference No.: 72000973
- Added to NRHP: September 11, 1972

Rosedale, also known as Frew's Folly, is a historic plantation house located at Charlotte, Mecklenburg County, North Carolina. It was built about 1815, and is a Federal style frame dwelling. It consists of a 2 1/2-story, three bay by two bay, central block flanked by 1 1/2-story wings. It is sheathed in molded weatherboard and rests on a stone basement. Each section has a gable roof. The central block is flanked by exterior brick chimneys.

It was listed on the National Register of Historic Places in 1972.

The restored house and gardens are open to the public.
