= Historic Oak View =

Historic farm in North Carolina, United States

- Oak View
- U.S. National Register of Historic Places
- U.S. Historic district
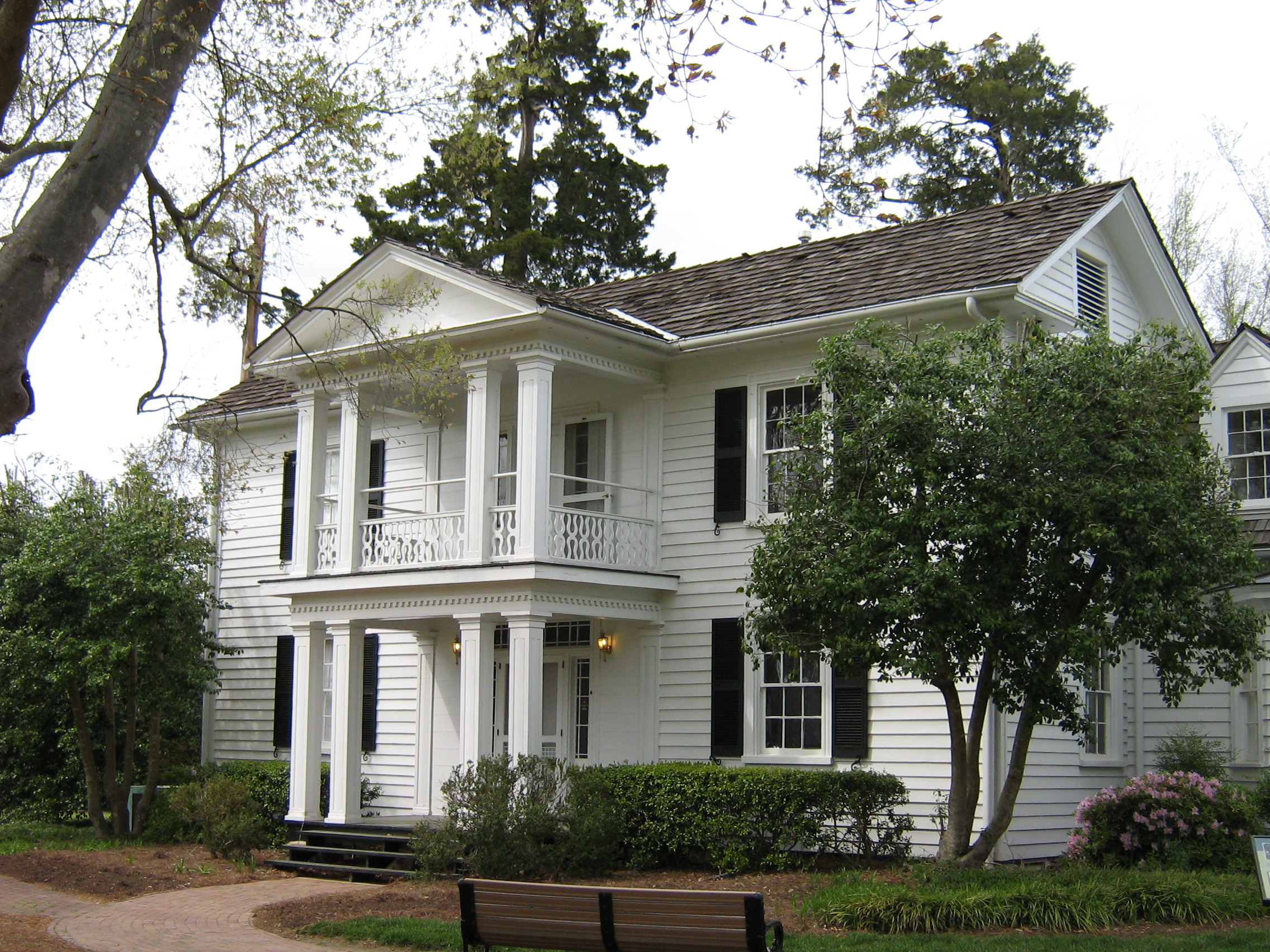
- 1855 Historic Greek Revival Farmhouse

- Location within North Carolina Location within the United States
- Location: Jct. of Poole Rd. and Raleigh Beltline, Raleigh, North Carolina
- Coordinates: 35°46′12″N 78°34′11″W
- Area: 15 acres (6.1 ha)
- Built: c. 1855
- Architectural style: Greek Revival, Colonial Revival
- NRHP reference No.: 91000359
- Added to NRHP: April 3, 1991

Historic Oak View, also known as the Williams-Wyatt-Poole Farm, is a 19th-century historic farmstead and national historic district located east of downtown Raleigh, North Carolina, United States. Founded as a forced-labor farm worked by black people enslaved by the land's white owners, Oak View features an early 19th-century kitchen, 1855 farmhouse, livestock barn, cotton gin barn, and tenant house dating to the early 20th century. The Farm History Center located on site provides information to visitors regarding the history of the Oak View and the general history of farming in North Carolina. Aside from the historic buildings, the site also features an orchard, a honey bee hive, a small cotton field, and the largest pecan grove in Wake County.

== History ==
Historic Oak View traces its history to a land purchase by Benton Southworth Donaldson Williams in eastern Wake County in 1829. This land was purchased from Arthur Pool for $135 and included 85 acres with several outbuildings none of which remain today. Williams continued to acquire land and holdings over the next 30 years; eventually including the land that houses Oak View's oldest building, the kitchen. In 1855, Williams completed construction of a two-story Greek Revival I house which would become the centerpiece of Oak View farm for the next century.

At its pre-Civil War height in 1860, the Williams family enslaved 10 people and produced 27 bales of Cotton per year. Cotton was considered "King" of the South leading up to the Civil War, and even afterwards many farmers including the Williams greatly increased their cotton production. By the 1880s, 93 percent of Wake County farms, including Oak View, produced cotton with the Williams family growing 82 bales of cotton a year. Following the Civil War, Williams was selected to be one of the four delegates representing Wake County at the 1868 North Carolina Constitutional Convention. His long-held Unionist views made him few friends in Raleigh during the Civil War, but his close association with Governor Holden ensured his place in deciding North Carolina's future through the Reconstruction. Of the four Wake County delegates' homes, only Oak View has survived.

Following Williams' death in 1870, he willed that his land be divided among his children and wife, Burchett. This land remained in Burchett's hands until she died in 1886. The land, house, and outbuildings were sold at auction to Job P. Wyatt whose family operated the farm for nearly sixty years. Many of the current outbuildings at Oak View were built during the Wyatt ownership including the cotton gin house, livestock barn, and the carriage house.

While the Wyatt family owned Oak View, they generally hired a manager to oversee the day-to-day operations. Unlike much of the South which used sharecroppers to farm their land, the Wyatts' property manager lived in the main house and oversaw the tenant farmers who grew both the Wyatt's crops and their own for a wage. While the tenant families sometimes stayed for as little as a year, Oak View continued to have tenant farmers living in small houses on the property until the 1980s. Despite the farm's success under the Williams family, the Wyatt family rarely made a profit off the farm, "At the close of each year, (they) would pore over the books to determine whether they could continue operation." Instead, the Wyatt family began using Oak View as a testing ground for their seed company that was based in Raleigh, North Carolina. They eventually shifted from predominately growing cotton to growing vegetables and pecans. The pecan orchard that the Wyatt family planted continues to produce a crop every year and is the largest remaining grove in Wake County.

Eventually, the Wyatt family traded the struggling Oak View to the Gregory-Poole family for a downtown office to help the Wyatt-Quarles Seed Company. Soon after the trade, James Gregory Poole moved into the farmhouse with his family. The Pooles lived at Oak View for three years and remodeled and updated the property. They built an addition to the house, put running water in the buildings, and electrified the property for the first time. Following their many additions, the Poole family sold the property to James and Mary Bryan in 1944. The Poole additions were the last major changes to the historic buildings and the property passed in and out of several families' hands before being purchased by Wake County in 1984. Originally intending to destroy the buildings to build an office park, several local prominent families and descendants banded together to save the property. In 1991, Historic Oak View was added to the National Register of Historic Places and Oak View was soon turned into a Wake County park.

== Current use ==
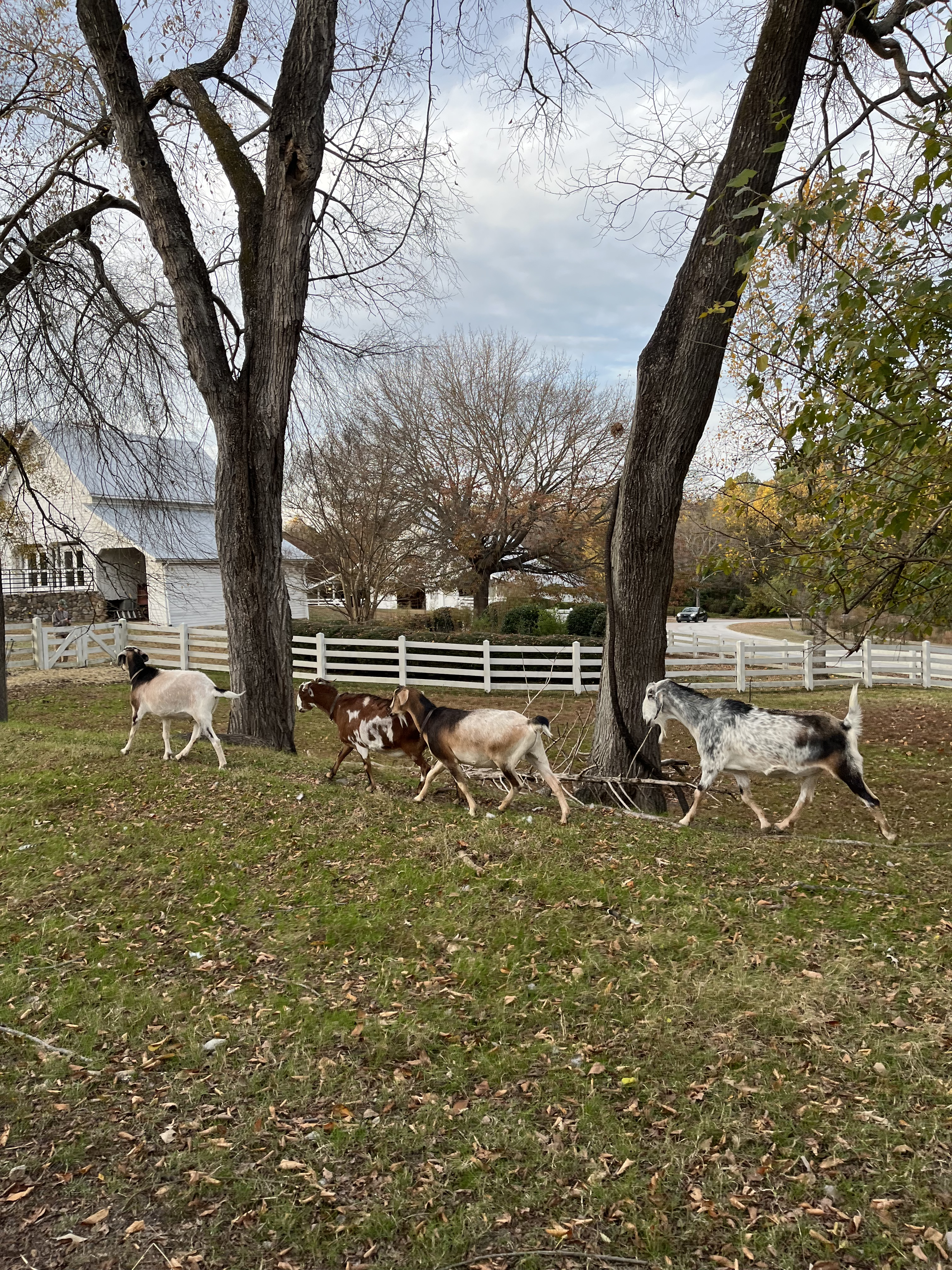
Oak View's four mini-Nubian goats (from left to right) Oscar, Leroy, Henry, and Felix

The Wake County Parks, Recreation and Open Space Division was given management of Oak View in 1995, creating the first historic site in the Wake County park system. With the completion of a Farm History Center in 1997, Oak View began to focus on teaching about North Carolina's agricultural history from colonial times to the present. In 2012, a historic tenant house was moved on site to begin interpretation into the lives of those who lived and worked on the Oak View land. Today, more than 100,000 visitors come to Oak View each year to learn about North Carolina's agricultural past through programs, events and exhibits.
