= Caswell Developmental Center =

Coordinates: 35.2754°N 77.6157°W

Geography
- Location: Kinston, Lenoir County, North Carolina, United States

Organization
- Type: Mental Health

History
- Opened: 1911

Links
- Website: www.caswellcenter.org
- Lists: Hospitals in North Carolina

Caswell Developmental Center is a center for adults with intellectual disabilities and other developmental disabilities in Kinston, North Carolina, United States. The Center started in 1911 and is still operating today.

== Caswell Center Museum ==
Exhibits at the Caswell Center Museum & Visitors Center focus on the history of the center, the quality of life of its residents, and the development of the medical care and treatment they received.
