= Arts Council of Wayne County =

The Arts Council of Wayne County located in Goldsboro, North Carolina was organized in November 1963. The Arts Council as it is known today, is a result of a merger between the Community Arts Council and the Goldsboro Art League. This merger was accomplished during 1980–1981. The stated mission of The Arts Council of Wayne County is to "ensure the arts are a thriving part of our community".
