= Hickory Ridge Homestead =

Coordinates: 36.2097°N 81.6698°W

Hickory Ridge History Museum is a history museum centered around the Colonial era in Boone, North Carolina located adjacent to the ''Horn In The West'' Outdoor Drama. The museum's motto is "Keeping Yesterday For Tomorrow". The museum is a non-profit operation run by the Southern Appalachian Historical Association.

The museum is currently composed of six historic cabins, complete with authentic artifacts and furnishings, set in a park. The oldest cabin is the Tatum Cabin which was originally located in Todd, North Carolina. The Tatum Cabin is dated around the time of the end of the American Revolution. The Coffey House is another cabin at the museum; it dates to around the beginning of the 1800s. There are several other cabins at the museum: a WPA cabin built during the 1930s and a cabin that is set up as a tavern.

The staff dress in period clothing and provide the history of the structures and demonstrate the lifestyles of colonial settlers in the region. Some the activities demonstrated by the volunteers include: spinning, weaving, cooking traditional food over an open fire, blacksmithing, tomahawk throwing, candle dipping, shooting black-powder guns, basket weaving and more.
