= Port O' Plymouth Museum =

- Location within North Carolina
- Established: 1989
- Location: Plymouth, North Carolina
- Coordinates: 35.86858°N 76.74842°W
- Website: portoplymouthmuseum.org

The Port O' Plymouth Museum, located in Plymouth, North Carolina contains many artifacts from the American Civil War. A replica of the CSS Albemarle is also located behind the museum in the Roanoke River.

The museum is operated by the Washington County Historical Society.
