= Valdese Elementary School =

Historic school building in North Carolina, United States

- U.S. National Register of Historic Places
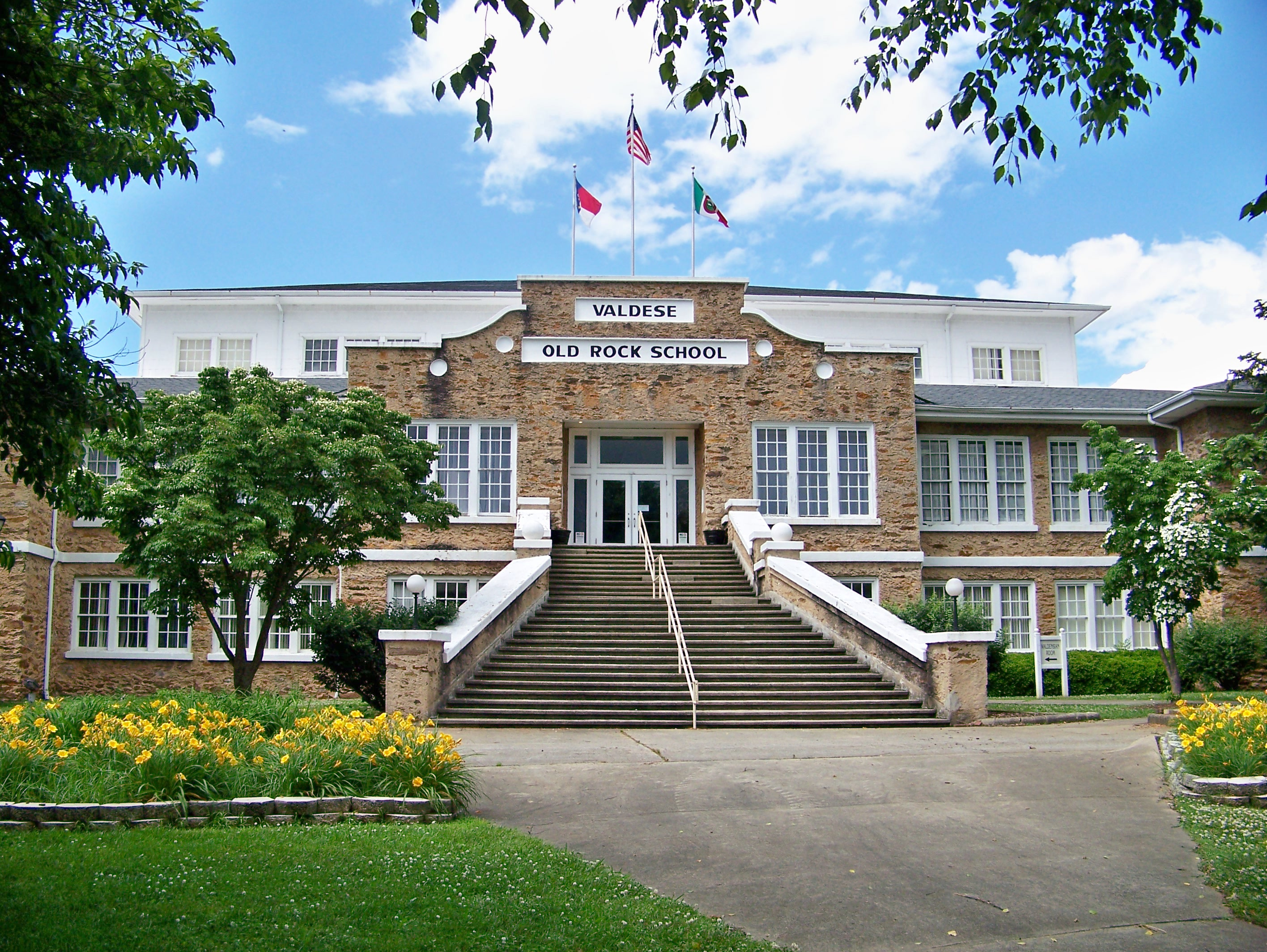

- Location within North Carolina Location within the United States
- Location: 400 Main St., Valdese, North Carolina
- Coordinates: 35°44′41″N 81°34′1″W
- Area: 1.9 acres (0.77 ha)
- Built: 1922-1923
- Architect: Herman, Quince E.
- NRHP reference No.: 84000115
- Added to NRHP: October 25, 1984

Valdese Elementary School, also known as the Old Rock School, is a historic school building located at Valdese, Burke County, North Carolina. It was built in 1922–1923, and is a two-story, fieldstone four square building with a hipped roof. It features a T-shaped clerestory above the auditorium space. It was constructed largely by Waldensian settlers from Northern Italy.

It was listed on the National Register of Historic Places in 1984.

The Old Rock School is now home to several community organizations and events, including Bluegrass concerts, the Old Colony Players, the Rock School Art Galleries, Old Rock School Railway Museum, and Valdese Travel and Tourism.

== Old Rock School Railway Museum ==
The Old Rock School Railway Museum, also known as the Piedmont & Western Railroad Museum, is located on the lower level and is operated by the Piedmont and Western Railroad Club. Exhibits include photos, railroad art, tickets, railroad lanterns, steam whistles, spikes, silverware and china used on trains and other artifacts. The museum also features model railroad layouts, including a diorama depicting the original Waldensian settlers arriving by train on May 29, 1893.

== Rock School Art Galleries ==
The Rock School Art Galleries are also located in the Old Rock School. Exhibits are organized by the Rock School Arts Foundation.
