= Biltmore Industries, Inc. =

- U.S. National Register of Historic Places
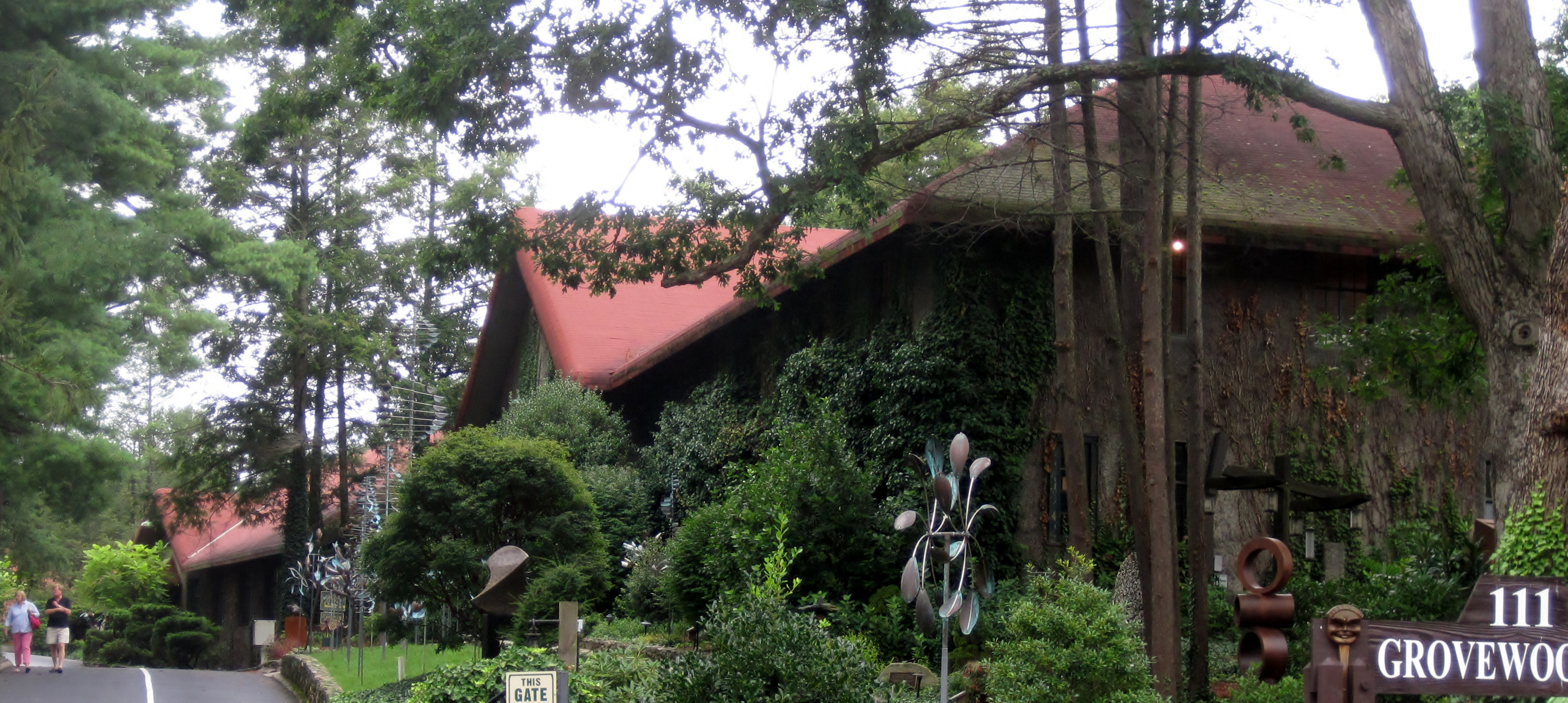
- Biltmore Industries, Inc., August 2012

- Location within North Carolina Location within the United States
- Location: Grovewood Rd., Asheville, North Carolina
- Coordinates: 35°34′3″N 82°32′34″W
- Area: 11.5 acres (4.7 ha)
- Built: 1917
- Architect: Seeley, Fred L.
- NRHP reference No.: 80002802
- Added to NRHP: February 1, 1980

Biltmore Industries, Inc., also known as Biltmore Homespun Shops, is a historic industrial complex located adjacent to the Omni Grove Park Inn in Asheville, Buncombe County, North Carolina, now known as Grovewood Village. Biltmore Industries was started by Eleanor Vance and Charlotte Yale, missionaries who moved to Asheville, NC in 1901. The complex of seven buildings were built about 1917 by Fred Loring Seely, and are constructed of hollow ceramic tile with stuccoed exterior wall surfaces. The buildings are The Eleanor Vance Building (1917), Charlotte Yale Building (1917), Carding and Spinning Building (1917), (Former) Weavers' Building (now Antique Car Museum) (1923), Boiler House (1917), Gatehouse (former Woodworking Building), and Guardhouse (1917). The complex produced high-quality crafts and fine hand-woven wool cloth. The property was listed on the National Register of Historic Places in 1980.

== History ==
Dr. Rodney Swope, rector of All Souls Church, had come to Asheville in 1896 at the request of George Vanderbilt to serve as a spiritual leader for the community. Teacher and woodcarver Eleanor Vance and weaver Charlotte Yale came to Asheville in 1901. Because the boys showed an interest in the women's work, Swope asked that they become a part of the church's mission. George Vanderbilt's wife Edith moved the club to a better location at Biltmore Plaza. The Girls' Club and Boys' Club formed Biltmore Estate Industries in 1905, selling chairs, picture frames, boxes and baskets. Children did the work in the afternoon for pay. Vance and Yale moved to Tryon, North Carolina in 1914 after George Vanderbilt's death, and Fred Seely bought the company from Edith Vanderbilt in 1917, changing the name to Biltmore Industries and moving it closer to Grove Park Inn. The company mostly did weaving, and each visitor was given a sample of cloth. Seely claimed Helen Keller wore his fabric because she had been given fabric when she visited.

Seely died in March 1942. His wife, Evelyn Grove Seely (daughter of Edwin Wiley Grove by his first wife, sweet Mary Louisa), became the owner of the complex. This was during World War II and it was difficult to find able-bodied workers to work in the wool industry. Fred Seely, Jr. was off in the war but took the reins of the family business when he came back from the war duties. Fred ran the business until 1953 when Mrs. Evelyn Seely died. Fred then began to sell off property. One man, Mr. Harry Blomberg, wanted to purchase a still from housed on the property. Seely said the only way to buy the still was to buy the whole complex of Biltmore Industries. The deal was made and Mr. Blomberg had a new endeavor. Blomberg was a major entrepreneur in Asheville, starting with a gasoline service station, and opened a Cadillac/Pontiac dealership, still open as "Harry's on the Hill" in West Asheville.

Blomberg converted the weaver building to an antique car museum and brought all of his antique cars from all over Asheville and put them on display for the public. However the shop continued to make homespun cloth well into the 1970s. He also made a museum for the Homespun Industry. These are still in operation today, now known as Grovewood Village. There is also a fine artist gallery on site. This is the world renowned Grovewood Gallery. Sherry Masters was in charge of the gallery for over 20 years. Also, there are several artists in residence that produce items such as high quality flutes, jewelry, glass and pottery works. Blomberg's grandson, Harry "Buddy" Patton, and his aunt (Blomberg's daughter) Barbara, are now the owners of the complex.

== Gallery ==
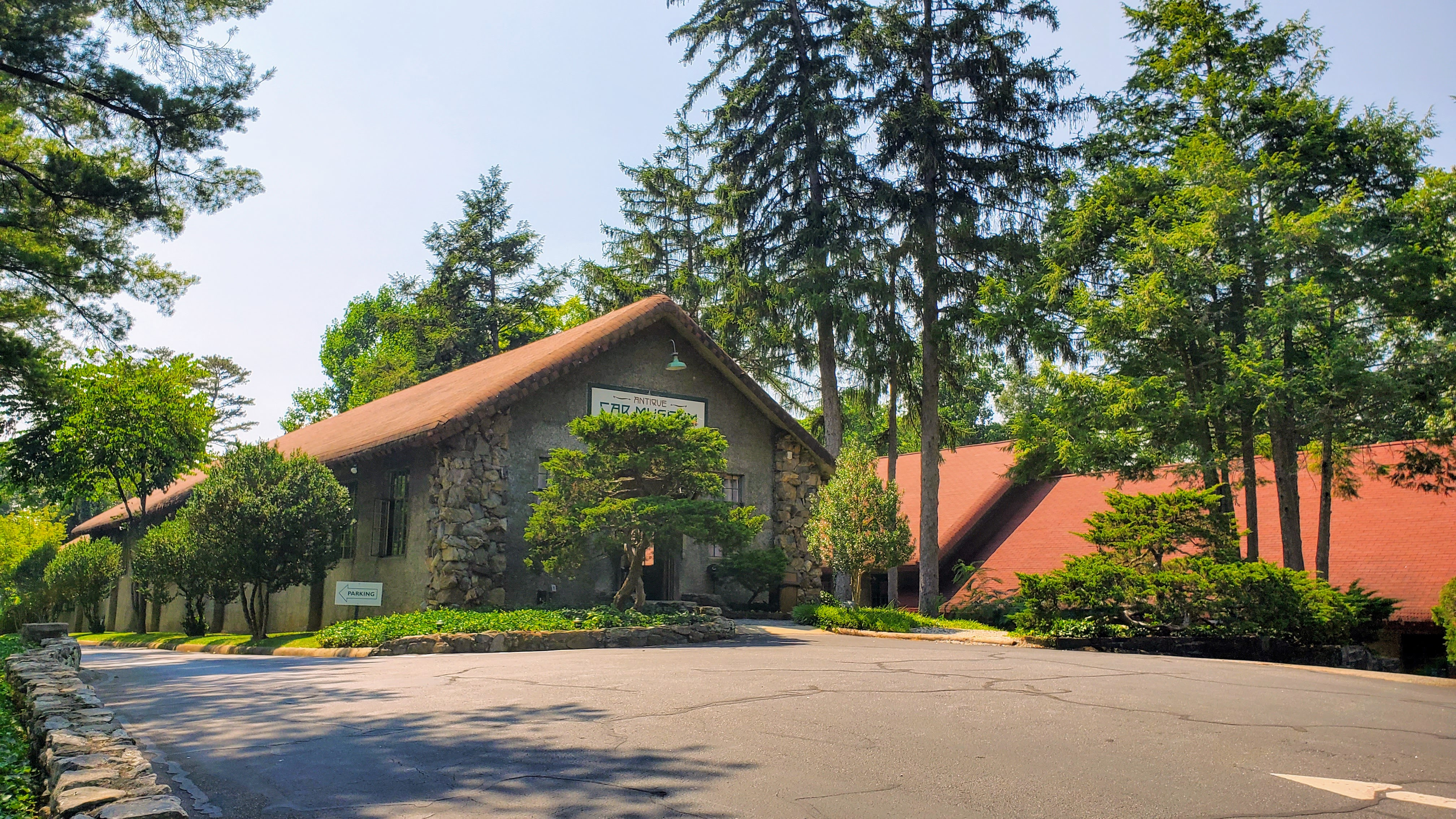
Weavers' Building, 2021

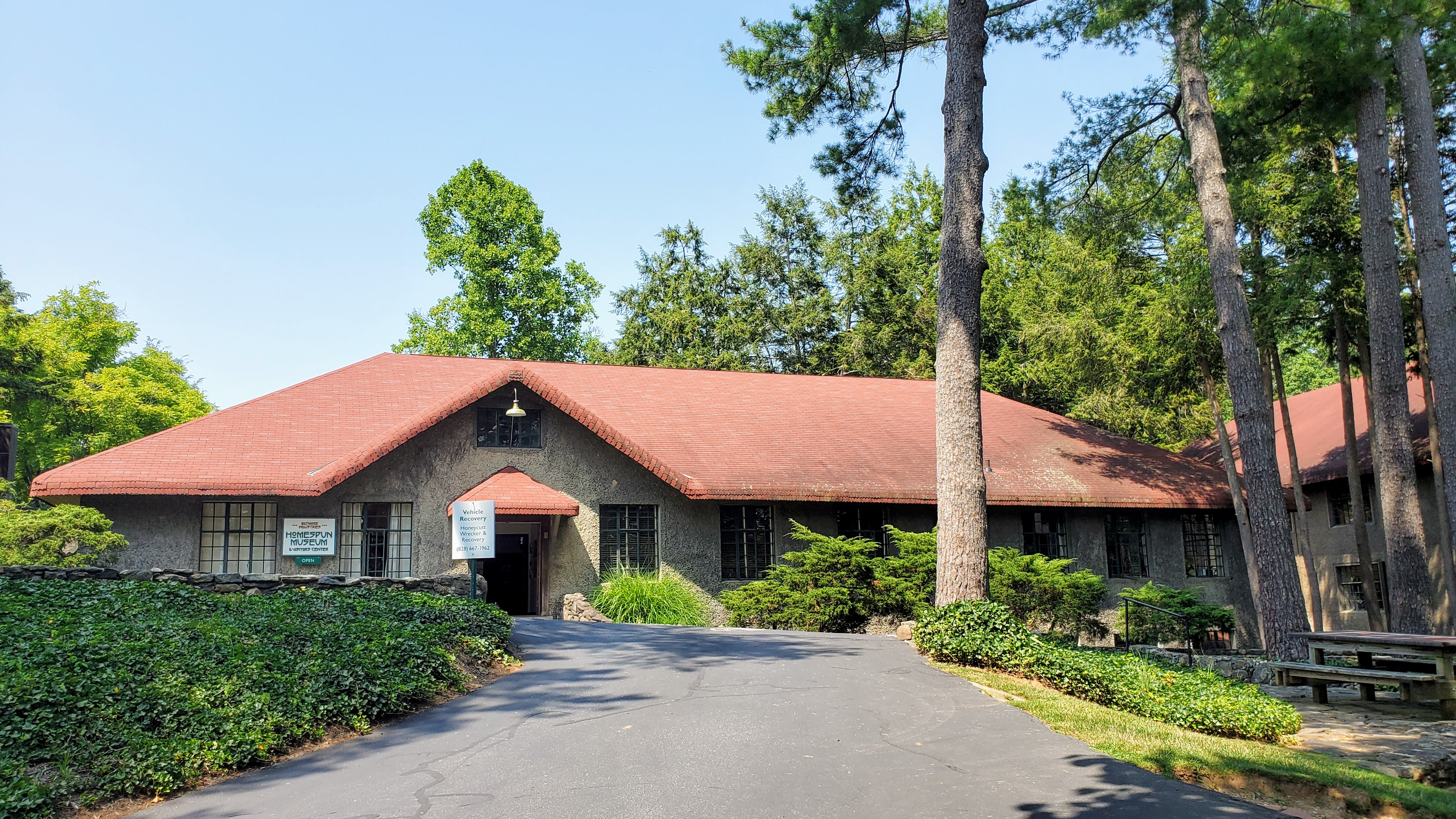
Charlotte Yale Building, 2021

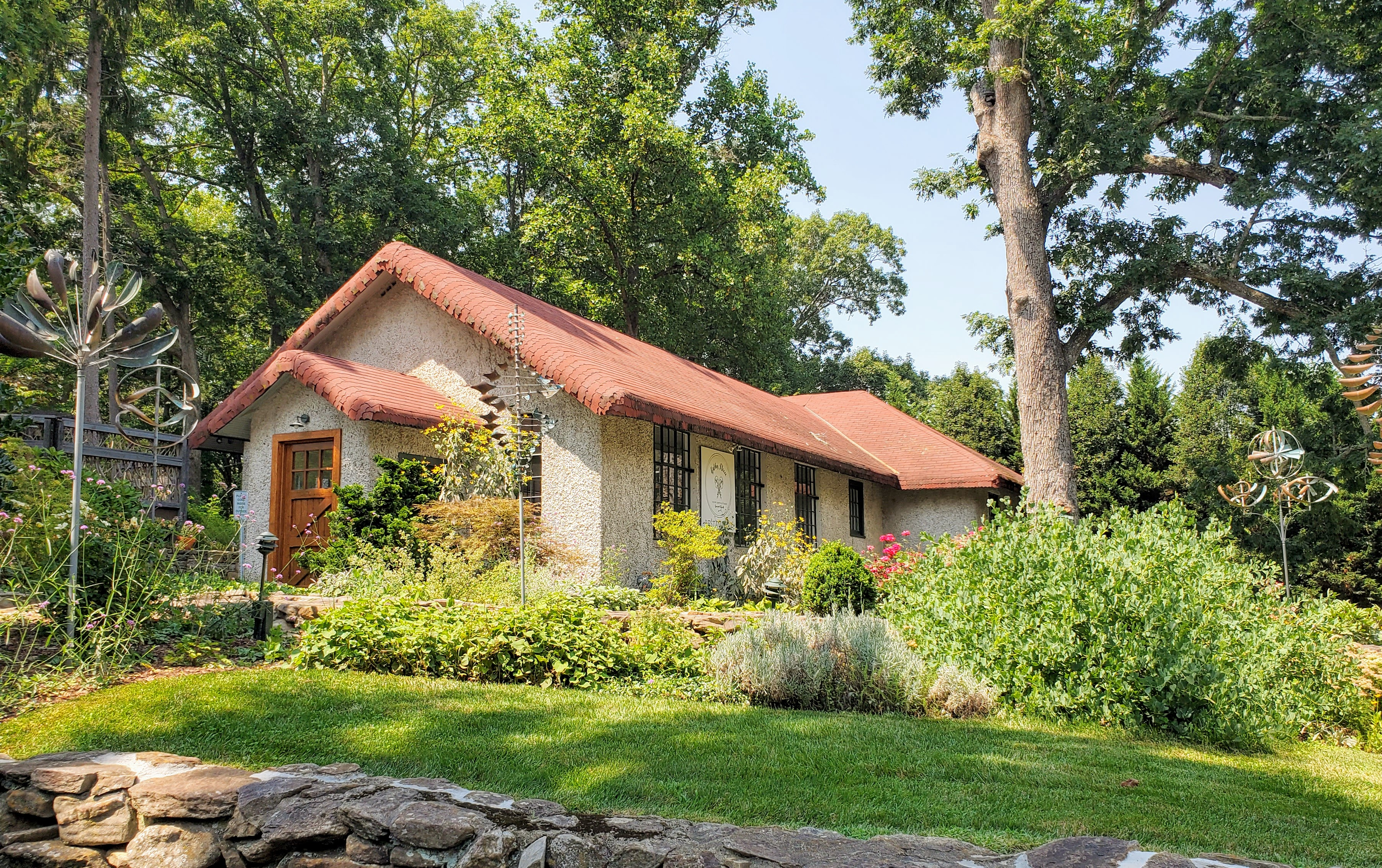
Gatehouse (former Woodworking Building), 2021

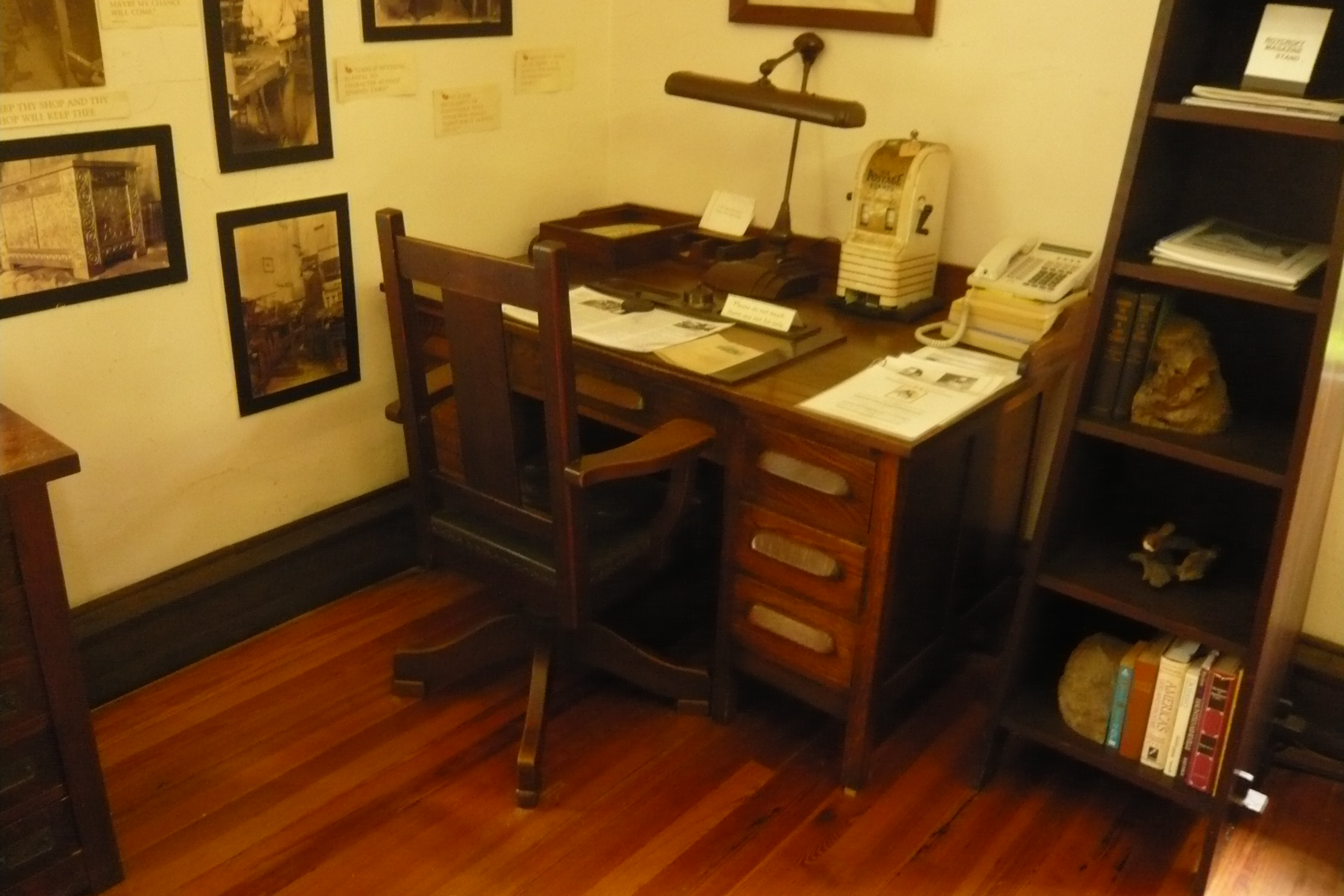
Desk Biltmore Industries, 2012

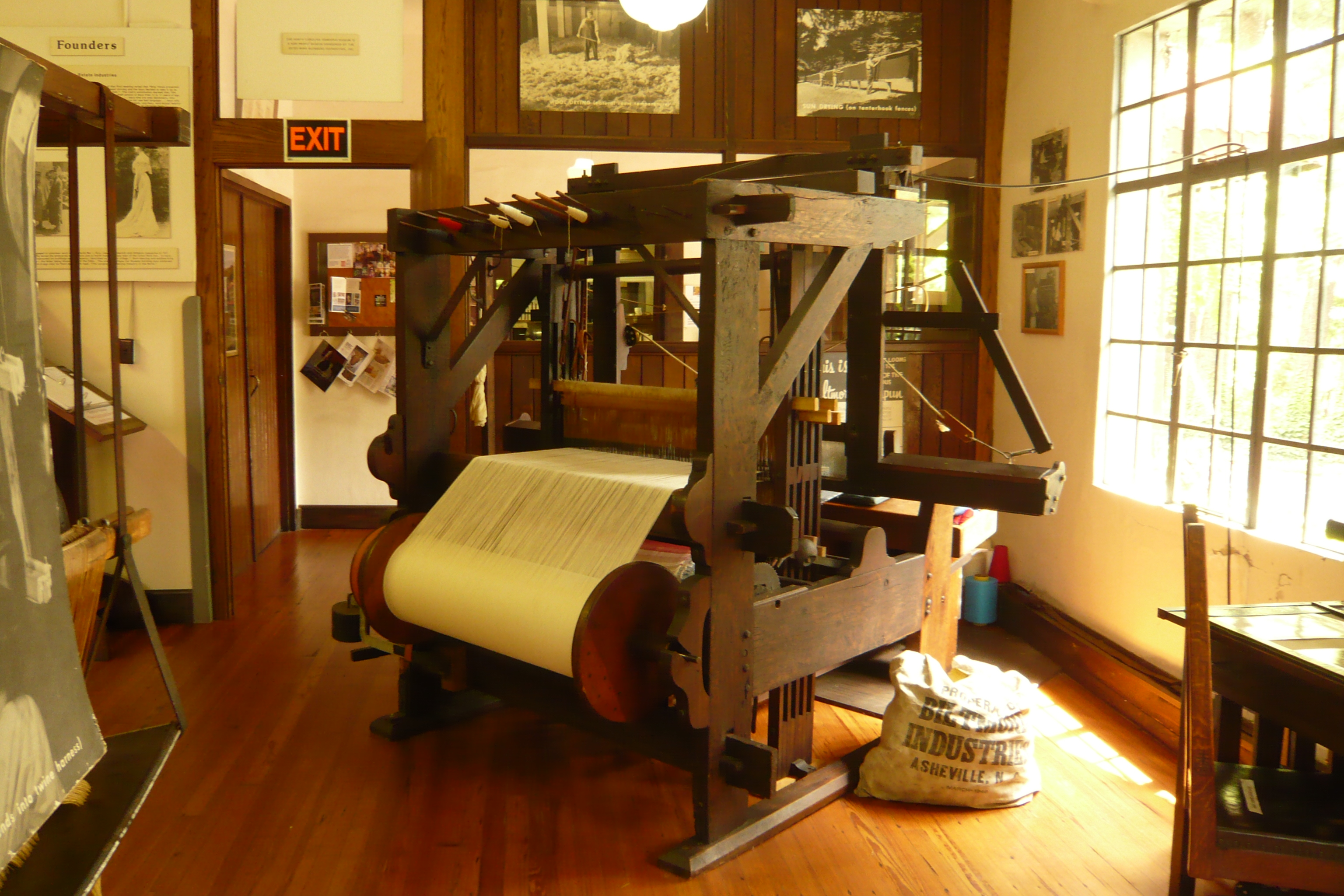
Weaving Loom, 2012
