= Museum of American Pottery =

Coordinates: 36.07748°N 78.74664°W

The Museum of American Pottery is located in Cedar Creek Gallery in Creedmoor, North Carolina, in a climate controlled room.

The museum came into existence after an exhibit called "Old Pots" premièred at Cedar Creek Gallery in the early 1970s. The collection has since grown to over 400 pieces. The museum celebrates the American potter and "the humble pieces of pottery which continue to inspire and enrich our lives today."

The Museum of American Pottery seeks to honor family and studio potters who, through their work, have made a significant contribution to the arts; to establish a permanent collection, open to the public, of historic and contemporary pottery by family and studio potters; to establish a library of books, magazines, articles, videos, and photos of pottery and potters from 1700 to the present; to provide funds for research and opportunities for pottery students to further their studies; and to make sure that examples of work by these potters are preserved for future generations.
