= Cedar Creek Gallery =

- Location of Cedar Creek Gallery in NC
- Established: 1968
- Location: 1150 Fleming Road; Creedmoor, North Carolina 27522
- Coordinates: 36.082470°N 78.747510°W
- Director: Lisa J. Oakley
- Website: cedarcreekgallery.com

Cedar Creek Gallery is a fine craft gallery located in Creedmoor, North Carolina. Craftspeople work alongside each other, fire wood and gas fired kilns, blow glass and make a living as artists onsite. Cedar Creek Pottery and Gallery was started in 1968 by Sid and Pat Oakley on what used to be an old tobacco field. The Gallery has grown from one building into over ten since then. The grounds are well maintained with many plants, flowers and trees.

== History ==
Sid and Pat Oakley purchased a plot of land in Northside, North Carolina (now part of Creedmoor). They affectionately called it "Strawberry Fields" and would often get visitors asking for the fruit. They used the property to make pottery and sold it on site. Eventually, the little shelter where they sold their wares gave way to a larger and larger space. Sid and Pat invited other craftspeople to work alongside them.

A book was written about Sid Oakley, entitled A Simple Life: A Story of Sid Oakley by Kathy Norcross Watts. Sid Oakley had his pottery commissioned by the Smithsonian. In 1989, Sid was named a North Carolina Living Treasure.

== Awards ==
Winner of the North Carolina Governor's Award for Excellence
Cedar Creek Gallery presents the Award of Excellence to an craftsperson each year at the Carolina Designer Craftsmen Guild, as the mark of excellent work deserving of special recognition.

== Shows ==
- Cedar Creek Gallery is home to the nationally-recognized triennial National Teapot Show.
- Spring Festival (formerly Spring Kiln Opening)
- Fall Festival (formerly Fall Kiln Opening)

The annual Spring and Fall festivals are the longest continually running outdoor festivals in North Carolina. The Spring Festival runs the first two weekends in April. The Fall Festival runs the first two weekends in October. There are craft demonstrations by glass, wood, pottery, jewelry, metalwork and fabric artisans. Work made during the festival is available for sale, right out of the pottery and glass kilns. Live music and food is also served.

- Art of the State - Periodic craft showcase of North Carolina artists

== Resident artists ==
In addition to a gallery of work for sale, several artisans collaborate and work onsite. The resident artists are:

- Lisa Oakley - furnace blown glass
- Brad Tucker - earthenware pottery
- John Martin - pottery, lamps
- Jennifer Stas - pottery
- Matt Decker - furnace blown glass
- Harrison Harper - furnace blown glass
- Pringle Teetor - furnace blown glass
- Dana Smith - furnace blown glass
- Will Kurylo - furnace blown glass
- Alan Bennett - pottery, fish
- Pat Oakley - pottery
- Sid Oakley [deceased] - pottery, painting, mosaics

Pringle Teetor, Dana Smith and Will Kurylo are part of the 4WindsStudio located at CCG

== Former resident artists ==
- Blaine Avery apprenticed under Sid Oakley and rented studio space from 1991 until 2002
- Jennifer Mecca worked as Gallery Manager and began her craft career in 1991.
- Tim Turner - worked and lived on site from 2009 to 2012. Pottery
- Sandra McEwen - Cloisonné & Champlevé Enamel Jewelry

== Other ==
The Museum of American Pottery is located onsite in a climate controlled room off the main Gallery floor.

== Sources ==
- News and Observer, Scott Huler, October 22, 1996, Glass Act: The first glass blowing studio in the Triangle features creative shapes, but Lisa Oakley says that doesn't make her an artist
- News and Observer, Kathy Watts, September 28, 2003, Potter's Daughter See the Light
