= Haw River Town Museum =

Museum in North Carolina, U.S.

- Established: 1997
- Location: 201 East Main Street Haw River, North Carolina
- Coordinates: 36.08962°N 79.36617°W
- Website: Haw River Town Museum

The Haw River Town Museum is a museum located in Haw River, North Carolina. Housed in a 145-year-old building which once served as the town's fire hall, the museum exhibits photographs, artifacts and memorabilia, focusing on the town's history.
