= National Register of Historic Places listings in Chowan County, North Carolina =

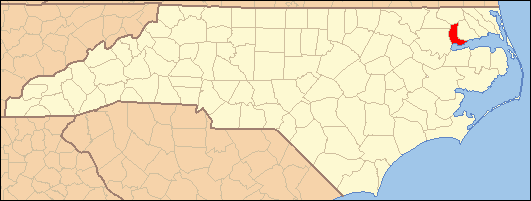

This list includes properties and districts listed on the National Register of Historic Places in Chowan County, North Carolina. Click the "Map of all coordinates" link to the right to view an online map of all properties and districts with latitude and longitude coordinates in the table below.

This National Park Service list is complete through NPS recent listings posted May 1, 2026.

	Name on the Register	Image	Date listed	Location	City or town	Description
1	Albania		May 13, 1976 (#76001313)	U.S. 17 W of jct. with NC 32; 36°03′37″N 76°37′08″W	Edenton	
2	Athol	Athol	May 22, 1980 (#80002808)	SE of Edenton on SR 1114; 36°00′43″N 76°33′38″W	Edenton	
3	Barker House	Barker House	March 24, 1972 (#72000931)	S Terminus of Broad St. 36°03′22″N 76°36′34″W	Edenton	
4	Chowan County Courthouse	Chowan County Courthouse	April 15, 1970 (#70000447)	E. King St. 36°03′28″N 76°36′30″W	Edenton	
5	Cullins-Baker House		April 29, 1982 (#82003442)	NC 32; 36°17′41″N 76°39′01″W	Smalls Crossroads	
6	Cupola House	Cupola House	April 15, 1970 (#70000889)	408 S. Broad St. 36°03′28″N 76°36′38″W	Edenton	
7	Edenton Cotton Mill Historic District	Edenton Cotton Mill Historic District	February 5, 1999 (#99000089)	Bounded by E. Church St., Bount's Creek, Queen Anne's Creek, and Wood Ave. 36°03′37″N 76°36′08″W	Edenton	
8	Edenton Historic District	Edenton Historic District	July 16, 1973 (#73001316)	Roughly bounded by E. and W. Freemason, S. Oakum, E. and W. Water, and Mosely Sts.; also both sides of the 300 block of E. King St.; also roughly bounded by Filberts Creek, W. Hicks St., Park Ave., the railroad right of way, and the original Edenton Historic District; 36°03′35″N 76°36′37″W	Edenton	Second and third sets of boundaries represent boundary increases of October 5, 2001 and September 28, 2007 respectively
9	Edenton Peanut Factory		September 20, 1979 (#79003328)	E. Church St. 36°03′37″N 76°36′09″W	Edenton	
10	Edenton Station, United States Fish and Fisheries Commission		September 14, 2002 (#02000961)	200 blk. Old Fish Hatchery Rd. 36°03′21″N 76°37′33″W	Edenton	
11	Golden Asro and Ruth Holley Frinks House		August 8, 2023 (#100009229)	122 West Peterson St. 36°03′59″N 76°36′31″W	Edenton	
12	Greenfield Plantation		May 6, 1976 (#76001316)	E of Edenton on SR 1109; 36°03′13″N 76°26′33″W	Somer	
13	Hayes Plantation	Hayes Plantation	February 26, 1974 (#74001341)	E. Water St. Extension; 36°03′00″N 76°36′08″W	Edenton	
14	Hicks Field		September 13, 1995 (#95001050)	Jct. of Freemason and Woodard Sts., NE corner 36°03′54″N 76°36′20″W	Edenton	
15	James Iredell House	James Iredell House	February 26, 1970 (#70000449)	107 E. Church St. 36°03′38″N 76°36′25″W	Edenton	
16	Cullen and Elizabeth Jones House	Cullen and Elizabeth Jones House	May 3, 2006 (#06000340)	2732 Rocky Hock Rd. 36°10′57″N 76°41′25″W	Edenton	
17	Susan J. Armistead Moore House		May 18, 2005 (#05000436)	NC 32, 0.25 miles W of jct. with NC 37; 36°01′50″N 76°32′16″W	Edenton	
18	Mulberry Hill	Mulberry Hill	May 13, 1976 (#76001314)	SE of Edenton on SR 1114; 36°00′38″N 76°32′11″W	Edenton	
19	Pembroke Hall	Pembroke Hall	November 7, 1976 (#76001315)	W. King St. 36°03′29″N 76°36′41″W	Edenton	
20	St. Paul's Episcopal Church and Churchyard	St. Paul's Episcopal Church and Churchyard	May 29, 1975 (#75001248)	W. Church and Broad Sts. 36°03′42″N 76°36′34″W	Edenton	
21	Sandy Point	Sandy Point	April 25, 1985 (#85000875)	Off NC 32 East of NC 1114; 36°00′40″N 76°31′15″W	Edenton	
22	Shelton Plantation House		October 29, 1974 (#74001342)	Off NC 32; 36°04′56″N 76°37′47″W	Edenton	
23	Speight House and Cotton Gin		September 22, 1980 (#80002809)	E. Church St. 36°03′47″N 76°35′42″W	Edenton	
24	Strawberry Hill	Strawberry Hill	May 22, 1980 (#80002810)	Church St. 36°03′41″N 76°35′46″W	Edenton	
25	Wessington House	Wessington House	March 20, 1973 (#73001317)	120 W. King St. 36°03′32″N 76°36′42″W	Edenton	

== See also ==
- National Register of Historic Places listings in North Carolina
- List of National Historic Landmarks in North Carolina
