= List of the oldest buildings in North Carolina =

This article attempts to list the oldest extant buildings surviving in the state of North Carolina in the United States of America, including the oldest houses in North Carolina and any other surviving structures. Some dates are approximate and based upon dendochronology, architectural studies, and historical records. Sites on the list are generally from the First Period of American architecture or earlier. To be listed here a site must:

- date from prior to 1776; or
- be the oldest building in a county, large city, or oldest of its type (church, government building, etc.),

Building	Image	Location	First Built	Use	Notes
Lane House		Edenton	1718–19	House	Oldest house in North Carolina identified by dendrochronology; One-and-a-half stories; located in the Edenton National Register Historic District; Owned by Steve and Linda Lane.
Sloop Point		Pender County	1726	House	Resembles Caribbean architecture
Newbold-White House		Hertford	1730	House	Oldest brick house in North Carolina.National Register of Historic Places, 1971.
Myers-White House		Hertford	1730	House	National Register of Historic Places, 1971.
St. Thomas Church		Bath	1734	Religious	Oldest surviving church building in North Carolina.
Orton Plantation Main House		Winnabow	1735	House	
St. Paul's Church		Edenton	1736	Church	National Register of Historic Places, 1975.
Mitchell-Anderson House		Wilmington	ca. 1740	House	One of the oldest houses in Wilmington.
Woodleys Manor		Pasquotank County	ca. 1740	House	Oldest house in Pasquotank County, oldest side-hall plan in North Carolina, and earliest known Carolina plan.
Palmer-Marsh House		Bath	1744	House	National Historic Landmark.
Milford		Camden County	1746	House	Oldest two-story brick house in North Carolina. National Register of Historic Places, 1972.
Duke-Lawrence House		Northampton County, North Carolina	1747	House	One of NC's oldest colonial homes. The original western frame section was built about 1747, with the eastern brick section built between 1787 and 1796. National Register of Historic Places in 1980.
Old Brick House		Pasquotank County	ca. 1750	House	National Register of Historic Places, 1972.
Hammock House		Beaufort	ca. 1700–1750	House	Purportedly oldest house in Beaufort, NC, also known as "Blackbeard's House," some sources claim it was built between 1700–1709, based upon a carved timber in the house.
Dr. Robertson House		Alamance County	ca. 1750	House	Alamance County Architectural Inventory, 2014.
Hampton Family House		Hamptonville, North Carolina	ca. 1757	House	The oldest house in Yadkin County. Ref: Historical Architecture of Yadkin County North Carolina, copyright 1987; The Yadkin County Historical Society
Cupola House		Edenton	1758	House	National Register of Historic Places, 1970.
The Owens House		Halifax	1760	House	Entered on the National Register of Historic Places in 1971, this gambrel-roofed home of a merchant was built about 1760. It was named for George Owens and is the oldest structure of the Historic Halifax State Historic Site.
Joel Lane House		Raleigh	ca. 1760–1770	House	Oldest house in Raleigh
DuBoise-Boatwright House		Wilmington	1765	House	One of the oldest houses in Wilmington.
Michael Braun House		Granite Quarry	1766	House	Also called Old Stone House. Oldest building in Rowan County.
Chowan County Courthouse		Edenton	1767	Courthouse	Oldest courthouse in North Carolina. National Register of Historic Places, 1970.
St. Philip's Church		Brunswick Town	1768	Church	
Single Brothers' House		Winston-Salem	1769	House	Part of Moravian settlement.
Burgwin-Wright House		Wilmington	1770	House	One of the oldest houses in Wilmington.
Hugh Torrance House and Store		Huntersville	ca. 1779	Store and House	The oldest standing store in North Carolina, and one of the oldest surviving structures in Mecklenburg County.
Patrick Gordon House		New Bern	1771	House	National Register, Oldest substantially unaltered house in New Bern.
House in the Horseshoe		Carthage	1772	House	Historic battle site between American Revolution loyalists and patriots.
Nash-Hooper House		Hillsborough	1772	House	National Historic Landmark, home to signatory of the Declaration of Independence.
Hezekiah Alexander House		Charlotte	1774	House	Oldest building in Charlotte. Part of the National Register of Historic Places
Robert Cleveland Log House		Wilkesboro	1780	House	Oldest house in Wilkes County.
Alexander Long plantation house		North of Spencer, North Carolina	1783	House	Oldest inhabited home in Rowan County
Salem Tavern		Winston-Salem	1784	Tavern	The Tavern was the lodgings for George Washington for two nights during his Southern Tour in 1791.
Cool Spring Place		Fayetteville	1788	Tavern	Oldest building in Fayetteville.
St. Philip's Church		Winston-Salem	1861	Church	Oldest African American Church building in North Carolina.
Temple of Israel		Wilmington	1876	Synagogue	Oldest Jewish synagogue in North Carolina.

== See also ==
- List of the oldest buildings in the United States
- List of plantations in North Carolina
- National Register of Historic Places listings in North Carolina
