= Mulberry Hill =

Mulberry Hill may refer to:

== Australia ==
- Mulberry Hill (Langwarrin South, Victoria), heritage-listed property in Langwarrin South, Victoria

== United Kingdom ==
- Mulberry Hill Mine, Cornwall

== United States ==
- Mulberry Hill (Edenton, North Carolina), listed on the NRHP in North Carolina
- Mulberry Hill (Lexington, Virginia), listed on the NRHP in Virginia
- Mulberry Hill (Randolph, Virginia), listed on the NRHP in Virginia
- Mulberry Hill, in Louisville, Kentucky, the family home of William Clark, of the Lewis and Clark Expedition

== See also ==
- Mulberry Grove (disambiguation)
- Mulberry Plantation (disambiguation)
