= Adrian H. Wood =

American blogger and educator

- Born: Adrian Thorpe Harrold; Rocky Mount, North Carolina, U.S.
- Education: Rocky Mount Academy; Salem Academy
- Alma mater: Meredith College; University of North Carolina at Chapel Hill; North Carolina State University
- Occupations: blogger, writer, educator
- Known for: Tales of an Educated Debutante
- Spouse: Thomas Benbury Paxton Wood
- Children: 4
- Website: talesofaneducateddebutante.com

Adrian Thorpe Harrold Wood is an American writer and educator. Wood worked as a community college curriculum specialist and a researcher for special needs-inclusive prekindergarten programs prior to writing her blog, Tales of an Educated Debutante. In 2025, she co-authored the book Autism Out Loud: Life with a Child on the Spectrum, from Diagnosis to Young Adulthood.

== Early life and education ==
Wood was born and raised in Rocky Mount, North Carolina. She is the daughter of Dennis Blair Harrold, a doctor, and was raised in the Presbyterian faith. She had an older brother, Adam Russell Harrold, who died from cancer when he was nineteen.

Wood was educated at Rocky Mount Academy until high school, when she attended Salem Academy, an all-girls boarding school in Winston-Salem, graduating in 1993. She studied Child Development at Meredith College and received a master's degree in Education and Early Intervention with a specialty in Inclusion from the University of North Carolina at Chapel Hill. She was awarded a full scholarship and research assistantship with the Howard Hughes Foundation while working towards a doctoral degree in Educational Research and Policy Analysis at North Carolina State University.

In 1994, while a student at Meredith College, Wood was presented to society at the North Carolina Debutante Ball in Raleigh.

== Career ==
While an undergraduate student at Meredith College, Wood worked as a teaching assistant in various preschools in Raleigh, including a semester at the Waldorf Early School. After graduating from college, she worked as a preschool teacher at an inclusive preschool program, as a children's ski instructor in Aspen, and as a nanny for the child of John Oates.

As a graduate student at the University of North Carolina at Chapel Hill, Wood worked as an early intervention assistant in Wake County and as a student teacher at an inclusive Head Start program. As a doctoral student, she taught undergraduate teaching fellows at North Carolina State University, worked in the office of the Provost, and worked as an evaluator with the Wake County Grants Department. Upon completing her doctorate in education Wood worked with Frank Porter Graham Child Development Institute in Chapel Hill as a research assistant and program evaluator, working on community college curriculum and gathering data for prekindergarten programs in New York and California.

In 2016 Wood began writing the blog Tales of an Educated Debutante after a twenty-year hiatus from work. On her blog she writes about education, public policy issues, life in North Carolina, motherhood, and raising a child with special needs. She was a guest speaker at the Junior League of Raleigh's general membership meeting, where she spoke on mental health. In 2017 Wood was a guest speaker at a fundraiser for Fans of Friendship House at Cape Fear Regional Theatre in Fayetteville.

In 2025, Wood co-authored the book Autism Out Loud: Life with a Child on the Spectrum, from Diagnosis to Young Adulthood along with Carrie Cariello and Kate Swenson.

== Personal life ==
Wood married Thomas Benbury Paxton Wood, an attorney from Raleigh, at St. Paul's Church, Edenton on October 5, 2002. They have three sons and one daughter. One of her sons is autistic. Wood and her family live in the Edenton Historic District and are parishioners at St. Paul's Church. They formerly lived in the Joseph Hewes House, which was built in 1756 and was once owned by Joseph Hewes, a signer of the United States Declaration of Independence. Wood converted to Anglicanism from Presbyterianism when she was forty-one. She serves as the Parent Teacher Association president at her children's public elementary school.

In April 2020 Wood voiced support of North Carolina Governor Roy Cooper for closing schools due to the COVID-19 pandemic in North Carolina.
