= James Iredell House =

Historic house in North Carolina, United States

- U.S. National Register of Historic Places
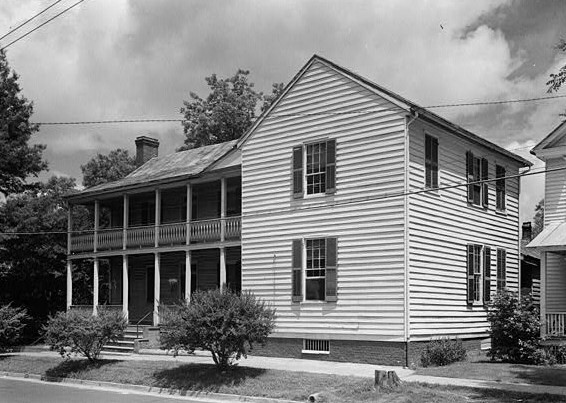
- The Iredell House in Edenton, North Carolina

- Location within North Carolina Location within the United States
- Location: 107 E. Church St., Edenton, North Carolina
- Coordinates: 36°3′38″N 76°36′25″W
- Built: 1759
- Architect: Unknown
- Architectural style: Georgian, Federal
- NRHP reference No.: 70000449
- Added to NRHP: February 26, 1970

The James Iredell House is a historic home located at Edenton, Chowan County, North Carolina. The original section was built 1800, and expanded to its present configuration about 1827. It is a two-story, L-shaped frame dwelling with Georgian- and Federal-style design elements. It was the home of James Iredell, an ardent patriot and Justice of the Supreme Court.

It was listed on the National Register of Historic Places in 1970.

The house is now a historic house museum, one of several sites of Historic Edenton, and belongs to the North Carolina Department of Natural and Cultural resources. Other historic sites open for tour include the Roanoke River Light, Chowan County Courthouse, Barker House, Cupola House and St. Paul's Church.
