= Roanoke River Light =

Lighthouse in North Carolina, US

Roanoke River Lighthouse
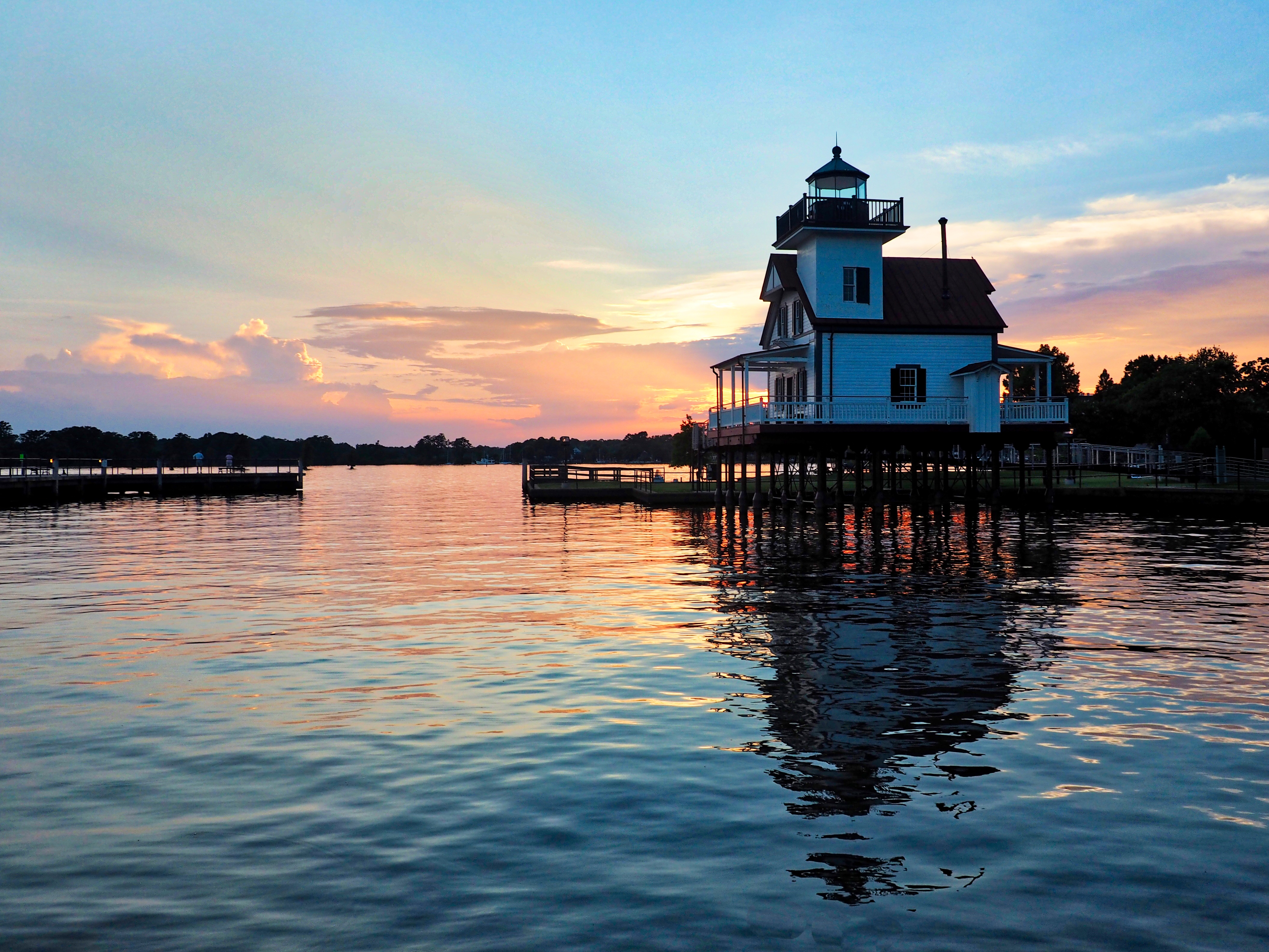
- Roanoke River Lighthouse (NPS)
- Location: in Albemarle Sound at the mouth of the Roanoke River; moved to Edenton, North Carolina
- Coordinates: 36.056029°N 76.610905°W (present)

Tower
- Foundation: screw-pile
- Construction: cast-iron/wood
- Height: 35 feet (11 m)
- Shape: square house w/central lantern (first) square house w/tower at corner (second)

Light
- First lit: 1867 (first light); 1903 (second light)
- Deactivated: 1941
- Lens: fourth-order Fresnel lens

The Roanoke River Lighthouse is a historic, decommissioned lighthouse, located on the waterfront of Edenton, North Carolina. The lighthouse once stood in Albemarle Sound at the mouth of the Roanoke River, across the Sound from its current location. The only surviving screw-pile lighthouse in the state, it has since been moved twice, and a replica of a predecessor light has been erected at a fourth location.

== History ==
A lightship was placed at this location in 1835, designated "MM" in the 1939 USCG list of early lightships. This vessel sported an arrangement of red, blue, and green lenses, and survived until the Civil War, when it was captured by confederate forces and was eventually taken up the Roanoke River and scuttled.

The first permanent structure was erected in 1866, a square screw-pile lighthouse similar to others in the region. This light burned in March 1885 and was reconstructed the same year; however, in the following winter moving ice broke two of the pilings and threw the house into the sound.

A new light was constructed at the same site in 1887, another screw-pile structure of an atypical design. The new light had two stories rather than the usual single story, and the lantern housing the lamp sat on a tower arising from a corner of the building, rather than being mounted at the center of the roof. The light was equipped with a fourth-order Fresnel lens.

Traffic through the area decreased in the twentieth century, and in 1941 the light was decommissioned, but left in place. It remained unoccupied into the mid 1950s, when in 1955 it was purchased from the Coast Guard by Elijah Tate, a local waterman, for $10. Tate had also purchased two other screw-pile lighthouses in the region, but both were destroyed in attempts to move them from their pilings. He sold the Roanoke River light to Emmett Wiggins, a tugboat operator who also ran a marine salvage business. Wiggins's solution to moving the light was to take a surplus Landing Craft Infantry (LCI) out to the light and place it beneath the structure, having partially flooded his improvised barge and removed all pilings but those at the four corners.

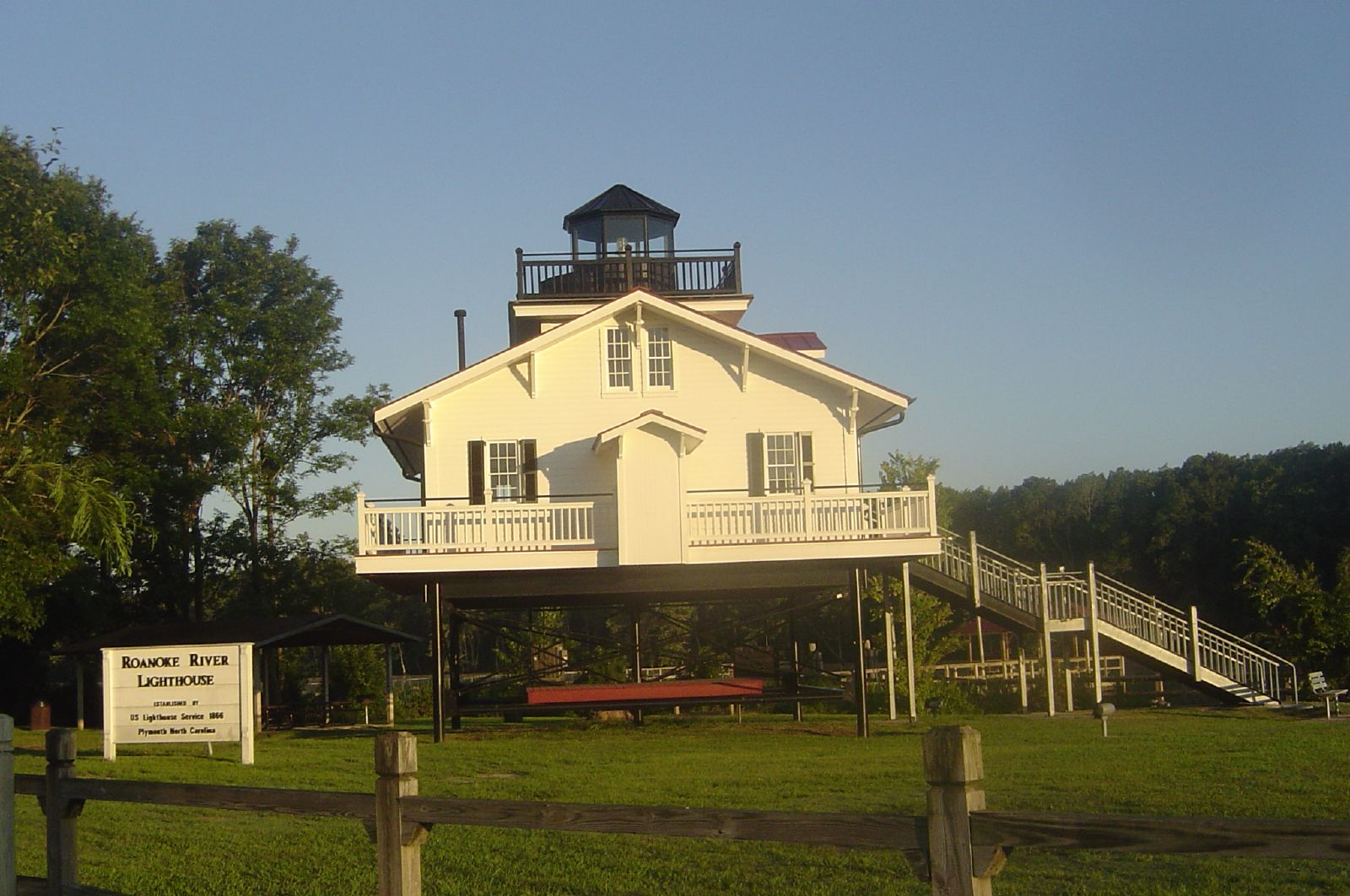
Replica of the Roanoke River Lighthouse, built at Plymouth, North Carolina

The ballasting water pumped out, the LCI rose up under the house and supported it as the remaining connections to the foundation were severed. The lighthouse was moved to a shore location at the mouth of Filbert's Creek just west of Edenton, North Carolina, where it would remain for over fifty years; it served as Wiggins's residence from 1960 until his death in 1995.

Officials of the maritime museum in Plymouth had approached Wiggins about purchasing the light, but a sale was not completed before his death, and the million dollar price asked by his heirs was rejected. Instead, they decided to build a replica of the earlier light, using archived plans. Construction on the replica began in 2001 and was completed in 2003, with the replica structure standing across the street from the maritime museum.

In 2007 the Edenton Historical society succeeded in purchasing the original lighthouse for $225,000, and on May 23, 2007, it was moved by barge to the town waterfront.

In 2009, the State of North Carolina provided $1.2 million for the restoration of the lighthouse. Then, in the spring of 2010, employees of the A. R. Chesson Construction Company, who were preparing the new site for the lighthouse, smelled an odor later determined to be petroleum. The contamination, likely from an oil company that had previously occupied the site, led the Town of Edenton, the property owner, to file for permits to permanently reposition the lighthouse over the water instead.

Structural restoration efforts began in 2010 with a replacement roof in the same material as the original construction, and all windows and doors restored and replaced. The restoration of the interior, complete with period furnishings, was finished in 2014.

The lighthouse is now one of several sites of Historic Edenton. Other historic sites open for tour include the James Iredell House, Barker House, Cupola House, Chowan County Courthouse and St. Paul's Church.

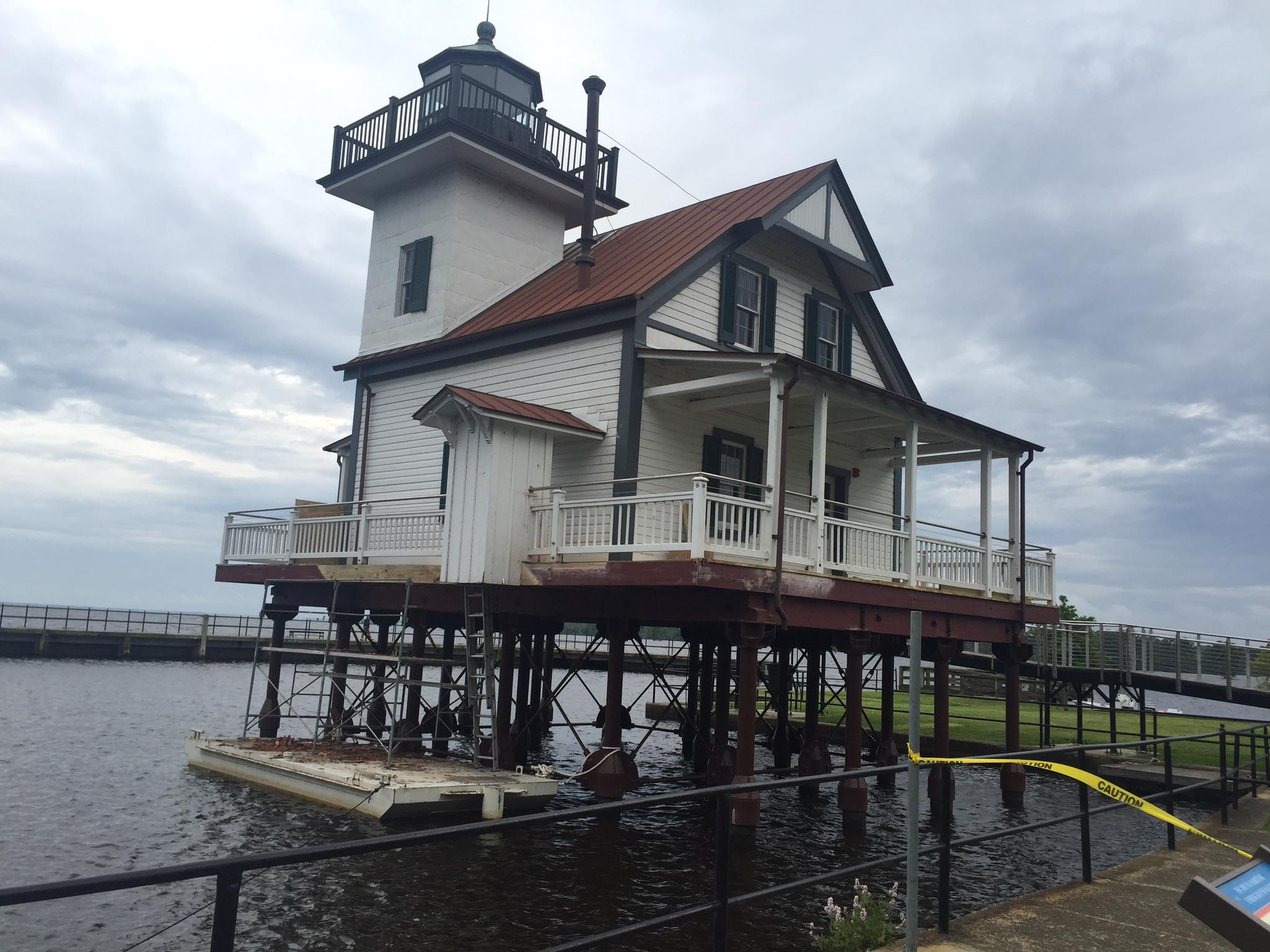
Third construction of the Roanoke River Lighthouse, following restoration in 2012. Lighthouse was moved via tugboat to current location in Edenton, North Carolina in 1955, for use as a private residence.
