= Little Rascals day care sexual abuse trial =

1989–1995 events in North Carolina, US

The Little Rascals Day Care Center was a day care in Edenton, North Carolina, where, from 1989 to 1995, there were arrests, charges and trials of seven people associated with the day care center, including the owner-operators, Bob and Betsy Kelly. In retrospect, the case reflected day care sex abuse hysteria, including allegations of satanic ritual abuse.

In January 1989, a mother alleged that Bob Kelly had sexually abused her child. After investigation, a police officer and social worker concluded the allegations were valid and authorities urged parents to have their children evaluated for abuse. A total of 90 children, after many therapy sessions (in some cases as much as ten months' worth), also made allegations resulting in accusations against dozens of people besides Kelly and charges against seven adults (Bob and Betsy Kelly, three workers at the day care, a worker at a local Head Start facility, and the son of a judge). The charges ultimately included rape, sodomy and fellatio, and publicized allegations included the murder of babies, torture and being thrown into a school of sharks.

During the trial, children were asked to testify about events that had occurred three years previously, with memories "refreshed" by therapy sessions, meetings with the prosecution and repeated discussions with their parents. While the alleged abuse was occurring, no parents noticed anything unusual about their children's behavior to indicate abuse or torture. The eight-month trial against Bob Kelly was the most expensive in North Carolina history, ending in conviction on 99 of 100 charges and twelve consecutive life sentences. On May 2, 1995, all convictions were reversed by the Court of Appeals. The remaining six defendants were charged with a mixture of charges ending in a variety of sentences from life imprisonment to seven years.

== Accusation ==
The Little Rascals Day Care Center was managed by Betsy Kelly, with help from her husband, Bob. In January 1989, a parent accused Bob Kelly of abusing her son at Little Rascals. The allegations were investigated by police officer Brenda Toppin and members of the Department of Social Services. In February, three additional children made accusations, and Kelly was arrested in April 1989, charged with child sexual abuse. The police department suggested to local parents that they have their children assessed for possible abuse, and provided a list of recommended therapists. After repeated questioning by police and their parents, a small number of children made disclosures of abuse; other children made disclosures only after long periods of therapy, some lasting as much as ten months. Ultimately a total of 90 children made allegations of physical and sexual abuse, which was claimed to have occurred between September and December 1988. The allegations were made against dozens of people in the town, but ultimately seven were arrested: Bob Kelly in April and six others in September 1989. These included Betsy Kelly; the day care facilities' cook (Dawn Wilson) and two teachers (Robin Byrum and Shelly Stone); Scott Privott, the son of a local judge, owner of a video store and personal friend of Bob Kelly; and Darlene Harris, who managed a nearby Head Start Program facility.

The trial was relocated 60 mi (97 km) away from Edenton due to difficulties in finding an unbiased jury. Defense attorneys claimed they were hampered in preparation of their case due to lack of access to files and the child witnesses, as well as the extensive preparation of the children by the prosecuting attorneys.

== Trial ==
The trial was relocated from Edenton to Farmville due to local publicity. "The attention became national...May (1991) with the broadcasting of a documentary, 'Innocence Lost,' as part of the PBS series Frontline, which suggested that abuse of the extent alleged by the state was impossible."

In March 1992, "Mr. Kelly, 43 years old, (was) facing 100 charges of sexually abusing a dozen children in 1988 and 1989 at the Little Rascals Day Care Center...Originally there were 248 charges involving 22 children, but the prosecution had withdrawn many charges while Judge D. Marsh McLelland...ha(d) dismissed others." "The assistant district attorney said, "their reactions fit the pattern of a traumatized child. They are a consistent picture that paints abuse."

=== Robert Kelly ===
Each defendant was tried separately, with Robert Kelly the first to be tried. Testimony lasted nine months with 12 children providing descriptions of sexual and physical abuse: babies ritualistically killed, victims taken out on boats and thrown overboard, and inappropriate trips in hot air balloons. In April 1992, "Robert Kelly Jr. was convicted of 99 of 100 counts of rape and related crimes against children." One of the mothers of the 12 children that testified against Kelly stated that she felt "overwhelming relief". The six other defendants, including Kelly's wife, had trials later. The jury believed the children on the witness stand. One juror stated "the children were convincing". Kelly and his supporters maintained that he was innocent.

Kelly was convicted and sentenced to 12 consecutive life terms in prison. The trial "included 83 prosecution witnesses and 60 defense witnesses". The children had testified that Kelly had forced them to have different types of sex. The parents testified that the children exhibited abnormal behavior. "Twelve children, between the ages of 4 and 7, testified, and the results of physical and psychological tests of them were presented as evidence."

=== Dawn Wilson ===
Dawn Wilson, the daycare center's cook and one of the accused, refused all plea bargains and elected to stand trial. During her trial, four children testified against her. After deliberation, the jury convicted her and she was sentenced to life in prison.

=== Betsy Kelly ===
In January 1994, Betsy Kelly had been in prison for two years awaiting trial. She accepted a plea of "no contest", and a sentence of seven years in prison. She served an additional year in prison and was released in 1995.

== Case reversed ==
Six months after Betsy Kelly's release, the North Carolina Court of Appeals reversed the convictions of both Robert Kelly and Dawn Wilson, stating that there were legal errors by the prosecution. On May 23, 1995, the prosecution dismissed all charges related to the Little Rascals case against the two.

== The others ==
The state dismissed its charges against Shelly Stone, Darlene Harris and Robin Byrum. Byrum had by then spent one year in prison awaiting trial.

After serving three years in jail, Scott Privott had his bond reduced from $1 million to $50,000, and he was released on bond. Rather than face a trial, Scott Privott accepted a "no contest" plea.

== Scholarly explanations ==
Scholars have proposed that these accusations were part of a broader phenomenon, a general fear or hysteria called Satanic Panic. Other day care staff were similarly accused of committing acts of violence against children during the 1980s and 1990s, and many accusations involved Satanism.

== In popular culture ==
PBS' Frontline examined the case in their television documentaries, Innocence Lost (1991), Innocence Lost: The Verdict (1993) and Innocence Lost: The Plea (1997). The 1993 and 1997 documentaries won Alfred I. duPont--Columbia University Awards.

== See also ==
- Day care sex abuse hysteria
- List of wrongful convictions in the United States
