= Speight House and Cotton Gin =

Historic house in North Carolina, United States

- U.S. National Register of Historic Places
- Location within North Carolina Location within the United States
- Location: E. Church St., Edenton, North Carolina
- Coordinates: 36°7′33″N 76°36′30″W
- Area: 5 acres (2.0 ha)
- Built: 1900, c. 1901-1902
- Built by: Speight, Will Oscar
- Architectural style: Queen Anne
- NRHP reference No.: 80002809
- Added to NRHP: September 22, 1980

Speight House and Cotton Gin is a historic home and cotton gin located at Edenton, Chowan County, North Carolina. It was built in 1900, and is a two-story, L-shaped, Queen Anne-style brick dwelling with a hipped roof. It features three full-height projecting demi-octagonal bays and spacious wraparound verandah. The cotton gin was built about 1901–1902, and is a brick L-shaped building with a one-story main block and two-story ell. Also on the property are a contributing smokehouse and other dependencies.

It was listed on the National Register of Historic Places in 1980.
