= Pembroke Hall (Edenton, North Carolina) =

Historic house in North Carolina, United States

- U.S. National Register of Historic Places
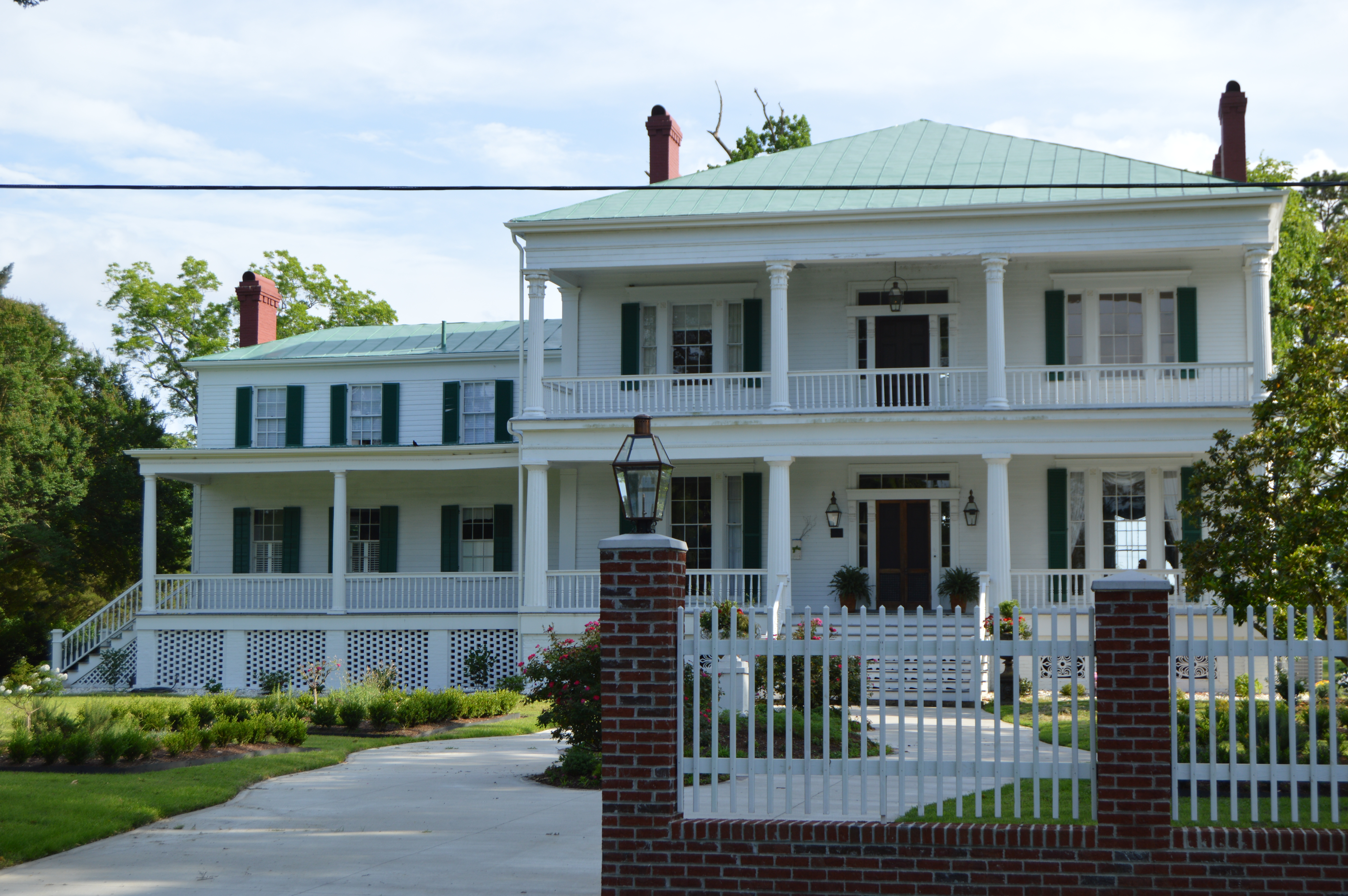
- Facade

- Location within North Carolina Location within the United States
- Location: W. King St., Edenton, North Carolina
- Coordinates: 36°3′29″N 76°36′41″W
- Area: 3 acres (1.2 ha)
- Built: c. 1849
- Architectural style: Greek Revival
- NRHP reference No.: 76001315
- Added to NRHP: November 7, 1976

Pembroke Hall is a historic home located at Edenton, Chowan County, North Carolina. It was built about 1849, and is a two-story, Greek Revival style frame dwelling with a low hip roof. It has a two-story, three-bay, frame wing. The front and rear facades feature full-length, three-bay superimposed porticoes.

It was listed on the National Register of Historic Places in 1976.
