= Chowan County Courthouse =

Historic courthouse in North Carolina, US

- U.S. National Register of Historic Places
- U.S. National Historic Landmark
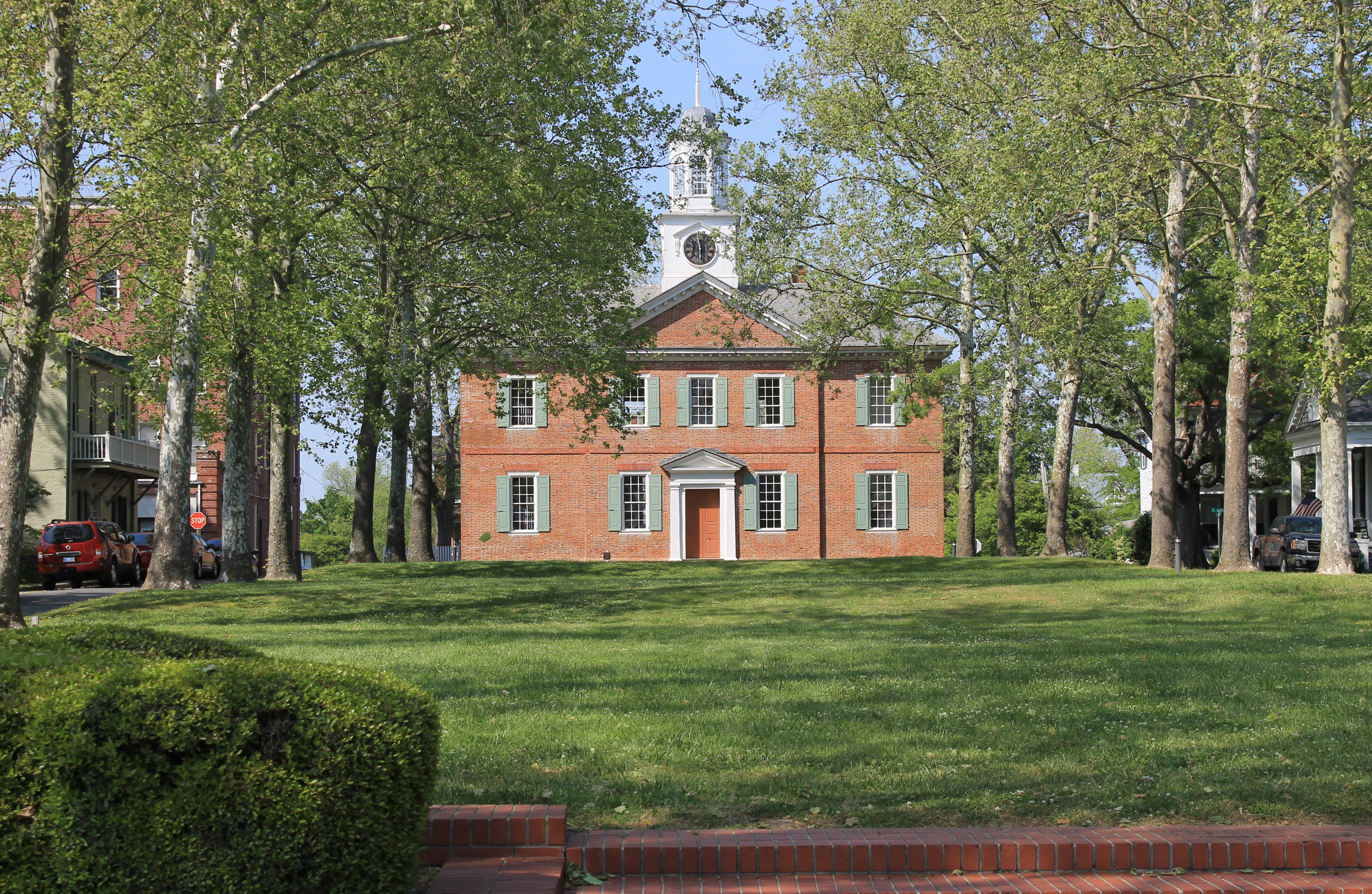
- Main façade of Chowan County Courthouse

- Location within North Carolina Location within the United States
- Location: 101 S Broad St., Edenton, North Carolina
- Coordinates: 36.0578°N 76.6079°W
- Built: 1767
- Architectural style: Georgian
- NRHP reference No.: 70000447

Significant dates
- Added to NRHP: April 15, 1970
- Designated NHL: April 15, 1970

The Chowan County Courthouse is a historic courthouse in Edenton, the county seat of Chowan County, North Carolina. Built in 1767, it is one of the finest examples of public Georgian architecture in the American South. It was declared a National Historic Landmark in 1970.

== Description and history ==
The old Chowan County Courthouse is located in downtown Edenton, at the northwest corner of East King and Court Streets. It is separated from the city waterfront by a one-block park. It is a two-story, T-shaped Georgian style building. Its brickwork is laid in Flemish bond. It has a one-story semicircular apse at its center rear and features a two-stage wooden cupola with ogival roof surmounted by a tall-weathervane. The interior has a large courtroom on the ground floor, and a ballroom on the second. The building has seen only relatively modest alterations.

Edenton was settled in 1658 and incorporated in 1712, and is counted as the first permanent European settlement in North Carolina. Its first courthouse, built in 1719, was also the seat of the colonial assembly, and was located on the land of the park. This courthouse was commissioned to be built in 1766, and completed in 1767, and its design has been attributed to Gilbert Leigh, who was living in Edenton at the time of its construction. It has also been attributed to John Hawks, who designed Tryon Palace in New Bern, was active in North Carolina at the time. It is the oldest courthouse building in North Carolina.

The courthouse is one of several sites of Historic Edenton. Other historic sites open for tour include the James Iredell House, Roanoke River Light, Barker House, Cupola House and St. Paul's Church.

== See also ==
- List of National Historic Landmarks in North Carolina
- National Register of Historic Places listings in Chowan County, North Carolina

== Works cited ==
- Barlow, Ava (2012), Architecture Styles in North Carolina Courthouses (PDF), North Carolina Administrative Office of the Courts
