= Sandy Point (Edenton, North Carolina) =

Historic house in North Carolina, United States

- U.S. National Register of Historic Places
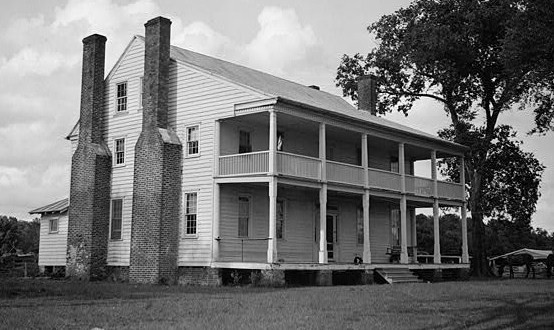
- Sandy Point Plantation, HABS Photo, July 1940

- Location within North Carolina Location within the United States
- Location: Off NC 32 East of NC 1114, near Edenton, North Carolina
- Coordinates: 36°0′40″N 76°31′15″W
- Area: 160 acres (65 ha)
- Built: c. 1810
- Architectural style: Greek Revival, Federal
- NRHP reference No.: 85000875
- Added to NRHP: April 25, 1985

Sandy Point is a historic plantation house located near Edenton, Chowan County, North Carolina. It was built about 1810 and later expanded. It is a 2 1/2-story, five-bay, Federal / Greek Revival style frame dwelling with a center hall plan. The front facade features a two-tiered full-length porch and the house has two exterior end chimneys at each side.

It was listed on the National Register of Historic Places in 1985.
