= Josephine Leary =

American businesswoman (1856–1923)

Josephine Napoleon Leary
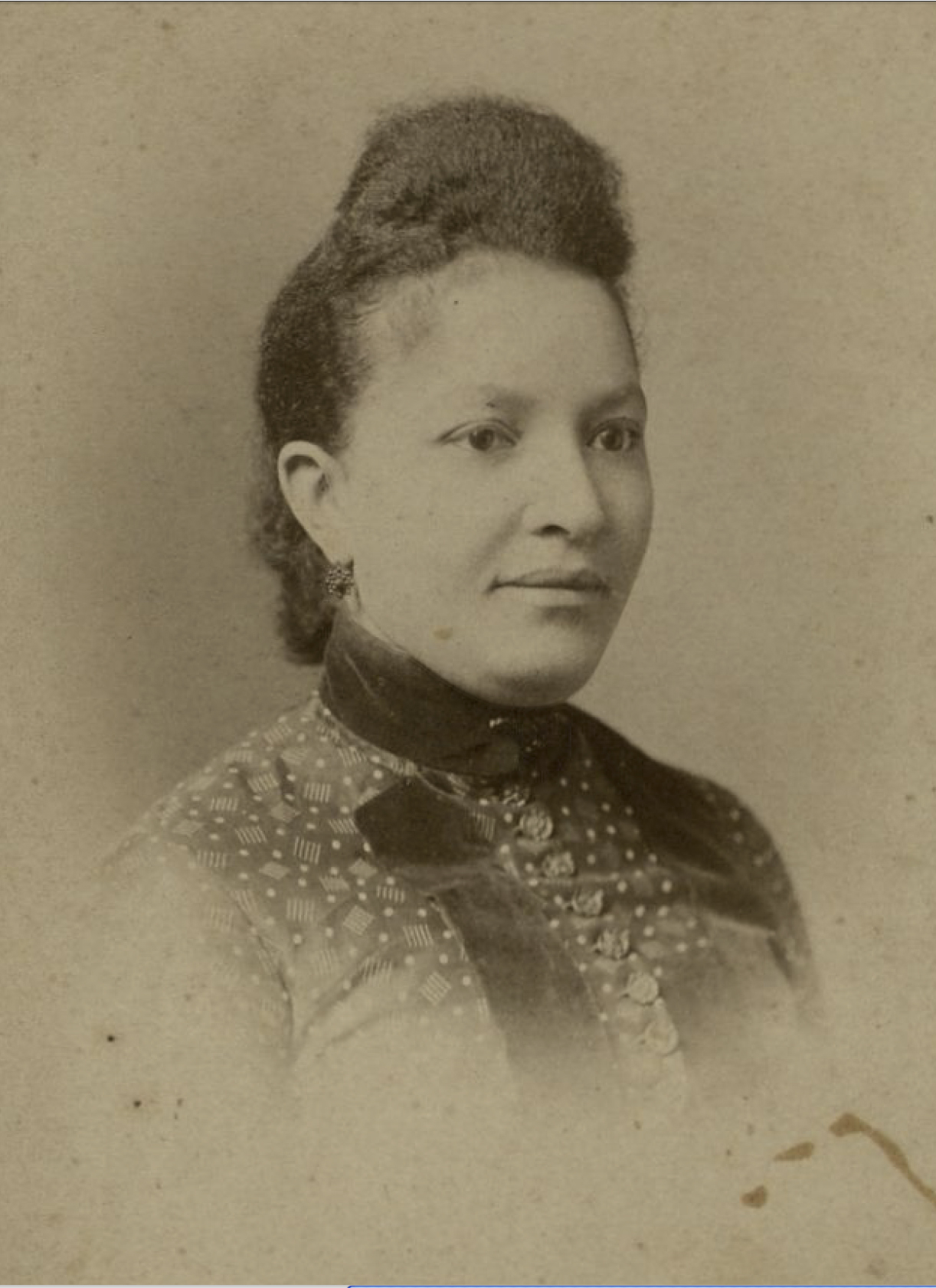
- Born: 1856; Williamston, North Carolina
- Died: March 13, 1923 (aged 66–67); Edenton, North Carolina
- Occupation: Businessperson

Josephine Napoleon Leary (1856–1923) was an American businesswoman and real estate entrepreneur from Edenton, North Carolina. The J. N. Leary building, a large commercial property in Edenton built in 1894, features her name on the pediment.

== Biography ==
Josephine Napoleon Williams was born into slavery circa 1856 in Williamston, North Carolina. Her mother was an enslaved Black woman, whereas her father was a white man, probably a member of the Williams family that owned the plantation on which she was born. Emancipated at the end of the American Civil War, Josephine accompanied her grandmother to Williamston to attend school and in 1873 married a barber by the name of Archer "Sweety" Leary, with whom she had two daughters, Clara (born 1874) and Florence (born 1880). She and her husband built a flourishing business as barbers in Edenton, and she made her first real estate property investment in 1873.

By 1881, Leary had purchased six residential and commercial buildings and lots in the Cheapside district of Edenton, including the Cheshire Storehouse, which spanned three lots on South Broad Street. When a fire destroyed the warehouse in September 1893, she hired architect Theo Ralph to construct the J. N. Leary Building on the site. Completed in 1894, this Victorian structure features Leary's name on the pediment and a distinctive metal facade manufactured by the Mesker Brothers. She continued to buy, sell, and rent out properties across Chowan County well into the 1910s. In 1907, she built a new brick barbershop at 317 South Broad Street, which also still stands.

Late in life, Leary suffered from cancer and had to sell or mortgage most of her property, including the J. N. Leary building, to pay for medical treatment. She died of stomach cancer on March 13, 1923, at the age of 67. Her estate was worth $8,825 at the time of her death, equivalent to over $10 million today.

== Legacy ==
Leary's business papers and correspondence were purchased by the David M. Rubenstein Rare Book and Manuscript Library at Duke University in 1991, with additional materials added to the collection in 2002. Selections from the Leary Papers were featured in an exhibit at Duke's Perkins Library in 2023. The Edenton Historical Commission celebrates her as a Woman of Distinction.

In 2022, Simon & Schuster published Carolina Built by Kianna Alexander, who fictionalizes Leary's life. The novel received a mixed review in Kirkus Reviews and a rave review in the Southern Bookseller Review. Publishers Weekly described the novel as "fairly unremarkable" historical fiction whose author "does a nice job illuminating the life of an extraordinary historical figure."
