= Hammock House (Beaufort, North Carolina) =

Coordinates: 34°42′49″N 76°39′19″W

Hammock House (also known as Blackbeard's House) is a historic house in Beaufort, North Carolina that is one of the oldest houses in the state.

The house is believed to be constructed in the early eighteenth century (circa 1700) and is a prominent example of West Indies architecture. There is a tradition that the pirate, Blackbeard (Edward Teach), stayed in the house in the eighteenth century while it was serving as an inn. In the nineteenth century, "[t]he house was used by the Union Army during the Civil War including a company of "Buffalo Soldiers," African-Americans who fought with the Union forces."<https://www.britannica.com/topic/buffalo-soldiers>"Hammock House - Beaufort, North Carolina & Carteret County NC > on the Crystal Coast". Archived from the original on 2013-11-07.</ref> On December 15, 2009, the house was featured on Episode 1.11 of Ghost Lab for its connection to Blackbeard.

== See also ==
- List of the oldest buildings in North Carolina
