= Ghost Lab =

Television series

- Also known as: Ghost Lab: Pursuit of the Paranormal
- Genre: Paranormal
- Directed by: Sumithrin David; Benjamin Wolf
- Starring: Brad Klinge; Barry Klinge
- Narrated by: Mike Rowe
- Country of origin: United States
- Original language: English
- No. of seasons: 2
- No. of episodes: 26

Production
- Executive producers: Gary Auerbach; Julie Auerbach; Alan LaGarde; Betsey Schechter
- Producers: Sumithrin David; Anne Garofalo Paterino; Lance Nichols; Lang Yee
- Production location: Multiple
- Cinematography: Brian Antonson; Robert Jakubik; Michael Hanneman
- Editors: Joseph McCaslano, Jesse Friedman; Joe Lorenzetti; Jonathan "Shaw" Grandi
- Camera setup: Multiple
- Running time: 45 minutes
- Production companies: Go Go Luckey Entertainment; Paper Route Productions, Inc.

Original release
- Network: Discovery Channel
- Release: October 6, 2009 – January 22, 2011

Related
- A Haunting (2005–2007)

Ghost Lab is a weekly American paranormal television series that premiered on October 6, 2009, on the Discovery Channel. Produced by Paper Route Productions and Go Go Luckey Entertainment, the program is narrated by Mike Rowe. It follows ghost-hunting brothers Brad and Barry Klinge, who founded Everyday Paranormal (EP) in October 2007.

Everyday Paranormal is a paranormal investigation team whose stated mission is to "visit the most haunted places in America, find evidence, and test new theories to probe the existence of the afterlife" using a fringe-scientific approach.

In addition to Brad and Barry, the team included members Steve Harris, Hector Cisneros, and Katie Burr. Other members included Jason Worden, Ashlee Lehman (Formerly Ashlee Hillhouse), and Steve Hock. Ghost Lab remains the name of EP's mobile command center.

On October 14, 2009, Brad and Barry Klinge were interviewed on The Pat & Brian Show about the origins of Everyday Paranormal, current investigations, and equipment use. On October 30, 2009, Larry King interviewed the brothers via satellite on CNN's Larry King Live.

== Team members ==
Everyday Paranormal (E.P.) founders and presidents Brad and Barry Klinge investigated alongside their "on-air" Ghost Lab team which included: Katie Burr (Investigator), Hector Cisneros (Investigator-season 1), Steve Harris (Tech Manager) Steve Hock (Ghost Lab Ops), and newest member Cory Lamey (Team Trainee).

Other Everyday Paranormal members included: Ashlee Hillhouse (Investigator), Jason Worden (Investigator/Affiliate Ops Director), and Jenn Hitt (Website/PR Events).

== Production ==
=== Equipment and techniques used ===
During investigations, the team used various investigation equipment, including thermographic cameras, infrared cameras, digital audio recorders, data loggers, EMF meters, laser thermometers, motion detectors, and EVP recorders, as well as a mobile command center called the Ghost Lab, which featured interactive computer monitors, noise filtering audio programs, and various high tech gear. The team also used a variety of paranormal theories to test out some of their techniques during an investigation.

== Episodes ==
=== Season 1 (2009) ===
No.	Title	Location(s)	Original release date
1	"Disturbing the Peace"	Shreveport Municipal Auditorium, Shreveport, Louisiana; Myrtles Plantation, St. Francisville, Louisiana	October 6, 2009
In this season premiere, the Klinge brothers, Brad and Barry along with their paranormal group "Everyday Paranormal" (E.P.) show how they investigate using different methods and experiments in the paranormal industry. They start off in the Bayou Country, where they investigate the Shreveport Municipal Auditorium in Shreveport, Louisiana and Myrtles Plantation in St Francisville, Louisiana.
2	"Tombstone"	Tombstone, Arizona	October 13, 2009
The E.P. team investigates areas around the town of Tombstone, Arizona, home of shootouts, legendary lawmen, famous cowboys and infamous outlaws of the wild west.
3	"Smell of Fear"	Liar's Club, Chicago, Illinois; The Mortuary, New Orleans, Louisiana	October 20, 2009
The team investigates alleged paranormal claims at the Liar's Club in Chicago, Illinois and The Mortuary in New Orleans, Louisiana, a former funeral home now turned Halloween attraction.
4	"Under the Skin"	Old Town Tatu, Chicago, Illinois; Miss Molly's Bed & Breakfast, Fort Worth, Texas	October 27, 2009
E.P. investigates a pair of allegedly haunted hotspots at Old Town Tatu, a tattoo parlor in Chicago, Illinois that's said to be haunted by its former owner. Then they head to Miss Molly's Bed and Breakfast in Fort Worth, Texas, a former bordello.
5	"Murky Water"	Nottoway Plantation, White Castle, Louisiana; Metro Rock Club, Chicago, Illinois	November 3, 2009
The team investigates the Nottoway Plantation in White Castle, Louisiana and the Metro Chicago in Chicago, Illinois. Their mission is to determine if locations near water breed paranormal activity.
6	"John Wilkes Booth"	Granbury Opera House, Granbury, Texas; Garfield Furniture, Enid, Oklahoma	November 10, 2009
The team travels to their home state of Texas to investigate a location rumored to be haunted by the ghost of John Wilkes Booth. First is the historic Granbury Opera House in Granbury where Booth as an actor took on a stage name of John St. Helen. Then they travel to Enid, Oklahoma to investigate the Garfield Furniture building, the suspected site of Booth's death when it was the Grand Avenue Hotel.
7	"They're Watching You"	Cafish Plantation, Waxahachie, Texas; Hotel Lawrence, Dallas, Texas	November 17, 2009
The team heads back to Texas to investigate cases involving potential object manipulation and violence: the Catfish Plantation in Waxahachie, a southern food restaurant and Hotel Lawrence in Dallas.
8	"Shadowman"	GDC Building, San Antonio, Texas; Volo Antique Mall, Volo, Illinois	November 24, 2009
E.P. heads to Texas and Illinois in search of the elusive "Shadowman." The investigation begins at the GDC Building in their hometown of San Antonio, Texas, a Civil War-era hotel renovated into an office building. Then they head to the Volo Antique Mall in Volo, Illinois to test the "Attachment Theory."
9	"Watery Grave"	Hotel Galvez, Galveston, Texas; Presidio La Bahia, Goliad, Texas	December 1, 2009
The E.P. team returns to homestate Texas to investigate Hotel Galvez in Galveston, where the whole town was destroyed by the Great Storm of 1900. Then they travel to Presidio La Bahia in Goliad.
0	"Alcatraz"	Alcatraz Island, San Francisco, California	December 8, 2009
The team investigates the infamous Alcatraz Island in San Francisco Bay, California, the former prison that first held Civil War prisoners then became a popular penitentiary for holding ruthless gangsters.
1	"The Ghost of Blackbeard"	Delta Queen, Chattanooga, Tennessee; Hammock House, Beaufort, North Carolina	December 15, 2009
The team investigates aboard the Delta Queen, an historic steamboat once piloted the Mississippi River now docked in Chattanooga, Tennessee. Then they investigate the Hammock House in Beaufort, North Carolina, the hangout where Edward Teach, the notorious pirate Blackbeard used to hide out from the authorities.
2	"The Blue Ghost"	USS Lexington, Corpus Christi, Texas; Ye Kendall Inn, Boerne, Texas	December 22, 2009
Barry Kling takes his brother Brad and their E.P. team to investigate his old home at sea when he was in the United States Navy, the USS Lexington, a World War II aircraft carrier now docked in Corpus Christi, Texas. Then they travel to Ye Kendall Inn in Boerne, Texas to investigate reportedly strange happenings.
3	"If Walls Could Talk"	Lemp Mansion, St. Louis, Missouri; McPike Mansion, Alton, Illinois	December 29, 2009
The team investigates the famous Lemp Mansion in St. Louis, Missouri, where four Lemp family members committed suicide. They also investigate McPike Mansion in Alton, Illinois where a strange white fog is said to develop in the basement.

=== Season 2 (2010–11) ===
On March 25, 2010, the Klinge Brothers announced through a YouTube video that Ghost Lab will return for a second season consisting of 13 episodes. Season 2 premiered on Tuesday, October 19, 2010.

Season two aired on Saturday at 2 a.m. EST on the Discovery Channel. Reruns of both seasons air weekday nights on the Science Channel.

No.	Title	Location(s)	Original release date
14	"Dead Will Rise Again"	Fairfield Inn, Fairfield, Pennsylvania, Farnsworth House, Gettysburg, Pennsylvania	October 19, 2010
Season two of Ghost Lab has the Klinge brothers and their Everyday Paranormal (E.P.) team investigate Fairfield Inn in Fairfield, Pennsylvania. Then they make the short trip across town to the Jennie Wade House and Farnsworth House in Gettysburg, Pennsylvania.
15	"The Betrayal"	Hill View Manor, New Castle, Pennsylvania; Fort Niagara, Youngstown, New York	October 21, 2010
E.P. investigates a former nursing home called Hill View Manor in New Castle, Pennsylvania and travels to Fort Niagara in Youngstown, New York, an American Revolutionary War and Civil War fort near Niagara Falls.
16	"Lizzie Borden"	Lizzie Borden House, Fall River, Massachusetts; Stone's Public House, Ashland, Massachusetts	October 28, 2010
The E.P. team checks into the Lizzie Borden House Bed & Breakfast in Fall River, Massachusetts, scene to an infamous axe murder, and Stone's Public House in Ashland, Massachusetts, which is rumored to be haunted by the original owner, Capt. John Stone and a little girl named Mary who was hit by a train.
17	"Afterlife Sentence"	West Virginia State Penitentiary, Moundsville, West Virginia private residence, Cleveland, Ohio	November 20, 2010
The team investigates West Virginia State Penitentiary (also called Moundsville State Penitentiary) in Moundsville, West Virginia, said to be home to the ghost of a former inmate William "Red" Snyder and a private residence just outside Cleveland, Ohio, where the owner says she is being plagued by apparitions from a headstone under her porch.
18	"Theme Park of Death"	Lake Shawnee Fun Park, Princeton, West Virginia private residence, West Virginia	November 27, 2010
E.P. investigates Lake Shawnee Fun Park in Princeton, West Virginia an abandoned amusement park with a tragic past that was built on a Native American burial ground, and a private residence in West Virginia's coal country.
19	"Eternal Home"	The Shanley Hotel, Napanoch, New York; The Poet's Loft, Hot Springs, Arkansas	December 4, 2010
E.P. checks into The Shanley Hotel in Napanoch, New York, believed to be haunted by the spirit of James Shanley, its former owner. Also the team investigates The Poet's Loft in Hot Springs, Arkansas, where a former poet and bongo drum player is said to haunt his beloved fiancée.
20	"The Morgue"	private residence, Arkansas; Harrisburg State Hospital, Harrisburg, Pennsylvania	December 11, 2010
E.P. investigates a private home in Arkansas believed to be haunted by Cherokee spirits and Harrisburg State Hospital in Harrisburg, Pennsylvania.
21	"The Innocent"	Soldiers National Museum, Gettysburg, Pennsylvania; Iron Island Museum, Buffalo, New York	December 18, 2010
E.P. travels back to Gettysburg, Pennsylvania to take on the spirit of Rosa Carmichael, an abusive matron at a former American Civil War era orphanage, now the Soldiers National Museum. The team also investigates a former funeral home, the Iron Island Museum in Buffalo, New York.
22	"No Escape"	Montana State Prison, Deer Lodge, Montana; Old South Pittsburg Hospital, South Pittsburg, Tennessee	December 25, 2010
The team investigates at the former Montana State Prison in Deer Lodge, Montana notorious for its 1959 riot. They also investigate the Old South Pittsburg Hospital in South Pittsburg, Tennessee where the resident caretakers believe a negative spirit may be threatening the safety of their young son.
23	"Path of a Killer"	Villisca Axe Murder House, Villisca, Iowa; Million Dollar Lane, Williston, North Dakota	December 31, 2010
The team investigates the Axe Murder House in Villisca, Iowa, the site of the 1912 axe murders where an entire family was slain. Also, E.P. investigates an old bowling alley named Million Dollar Lanes in Williston, North Dakota.
24	"Behind Stone Walls"	Pythian Castle, Springfield, Missouri; Hundley House, Carbondale, Illinois	January 8, 2011
E.P. investigates the Pythian Castle (also known as the Pythian Home of Missouri) in where the spirits of POW's are said to still be behind the castle's walls. Then they travel to Illinois to investigate the Hundley House, the former mayor's residence and site of an unsolved cold-blooded double murder that happened there in 1928.
25	"Chambers of Horror"	The Chambers of Edgar Allan Poe, Kansas City, Missouri; Great Lakes Shipwreck Coast Museum, Whitefish Point, Michigan	January 15, 2011
E.P. investigates The Chambers of Edgar Allan Poe, a horror attraction in Kansas City, Missouri. Then the team heads to Whitefish, Michigan to investigate a ship wreck museum called Great Lakes Shipwreck Coast at Whitefish Point Light Station, and gather a dive team to gather artifacts found on the SS Myron shipwreck in Lake Superior.
26	"Deadwood"	Fairmont Hotel and Wild Bill Bar, Deadwood, South Dakota	January 22, 2011
E.P. investigates two paranormal claims in the town of Deadwood, South Dakota, once home to Sheriff Seth Bullock and Calamity Jane at the Fairmont Hotel', and the site of Wild Bill Hickok's murder at the Number 10 Saloon, now called Wild Bill Bar.

== Release ==
=== Broadcast ===
Ghost Lab originally aired on the Discovery Channel Thursday nights at 10:00 p.m. until it was moved to Friday late-nights/Saturday early-mornings due to low viewer ratings. Each episode started out with a text stating: "The Klinge brothers are investigating..." with Brad and Barry conducting a "head-cam" walkthrough around reportedly haunted locations before they continued with the whole team investigation.

In 2010, Ghost Lab was canceled after the conclusion of its second season.

=== Home video ===
Ghost Lab appears on the compilation DVD entitled Paranormal: Haunts and Horrors. This DVD is produced by the Discovery Channel. The episode is "If Walls Could Talk" (S1-E13), in which the Klinge Brothers investigated the Lemp Mansion; it is the first episode on this DVD.

The Discovery Channel also released two more DVD titles: Ghost Lab: Volume 1, which features the first three episodes of Season 1 ("Disturbing the Peace", "Tombstone", and "Smell of Fear"), and Ghost Lab: Pursuit Of The Paranormal, which features more episodes from Season 1.

== See also ==
- List of ghost films
- List of reportedly haunted locations in the world
