= Wessington House =

Historic house in North Carolina, United States

- U.S. National Register of Historic Places
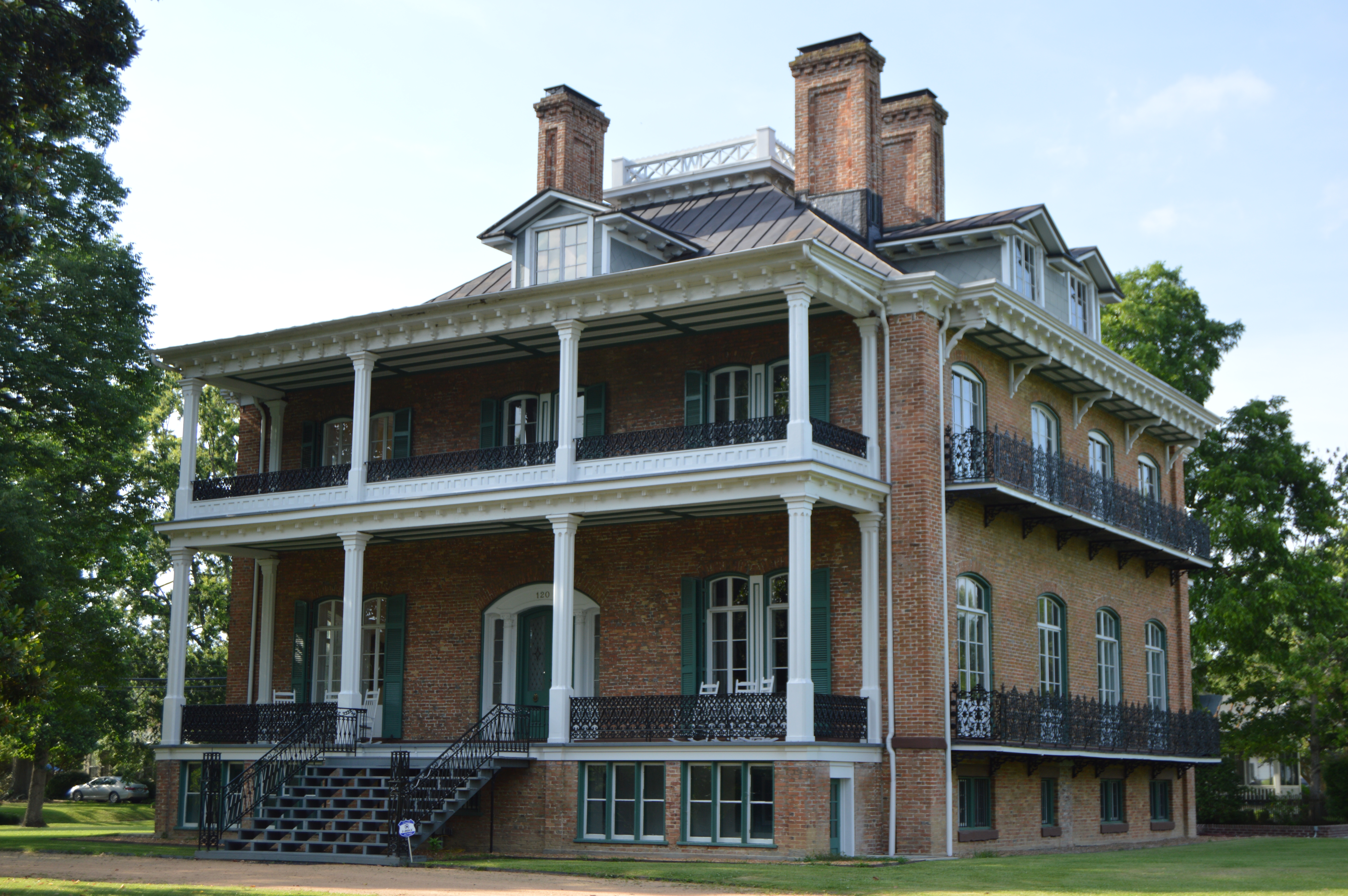
- Front and eastern side

- Location within North Carolina Location within the United States
- Location: 120 W. King St., Edenton, North Carolina
- Coordinates: 36°3′27″N 76°36′37″W
- Area: 0.8 acres (0.32 ha)
- Built: c. 1851
- NRHP reference No.: 73001317
- Added to NRHP: March 20, 1973

Wessington House is a historic home located at Edenton, Chowan County, North Carolina. It was built about 1851, and is a 3-story house with a full English basement, brick dwelling with a center hall plan. The front facade features a two-tiered full-length porch with elaborate iron railings and balustrade.

It was listed on the National Register of Historic Places in 1973.
