= Albania (Edenton, North Carolina) =

Historic house in North Carolina, United States

- U.S. National Register of Historic Places
- Location within North Carolina Location within the United States
- Location: US 17 W of jct. with NC 32, Edenton, North Carolina
- Coordinates: 36°3′37″N 76°37′8″W
- Area: 4 acres (1.6 ha)
- Built: c. 1857
- Architectural style: Greek Revival
- NRHP reference No.: 76001313
- Added to NRHP: May 13, 1976

Albania is a historic house located on U.S. 17 in Edenton, Chowan County, North Carolina. It is locally significant as an imposing Greek Revival house, built by Edward Warren.

== Description and history ==
It was built about 1857, and is a 2 1/2-story, five-bay, L-shaped Greek Revival style frame dwelling. It sits on a brick foundation, and has a 1 1/2-story rear wing. The front facade features a full-length two-tiered engaged porch supported by six square-in-section pillars.

It was listed on the National Register of Historic Places on May 13, 1976.
