= Barker House (Edenton, North Carolina) =

Historic house in North Carolina, United States

- U.S. National Register of Historic Places
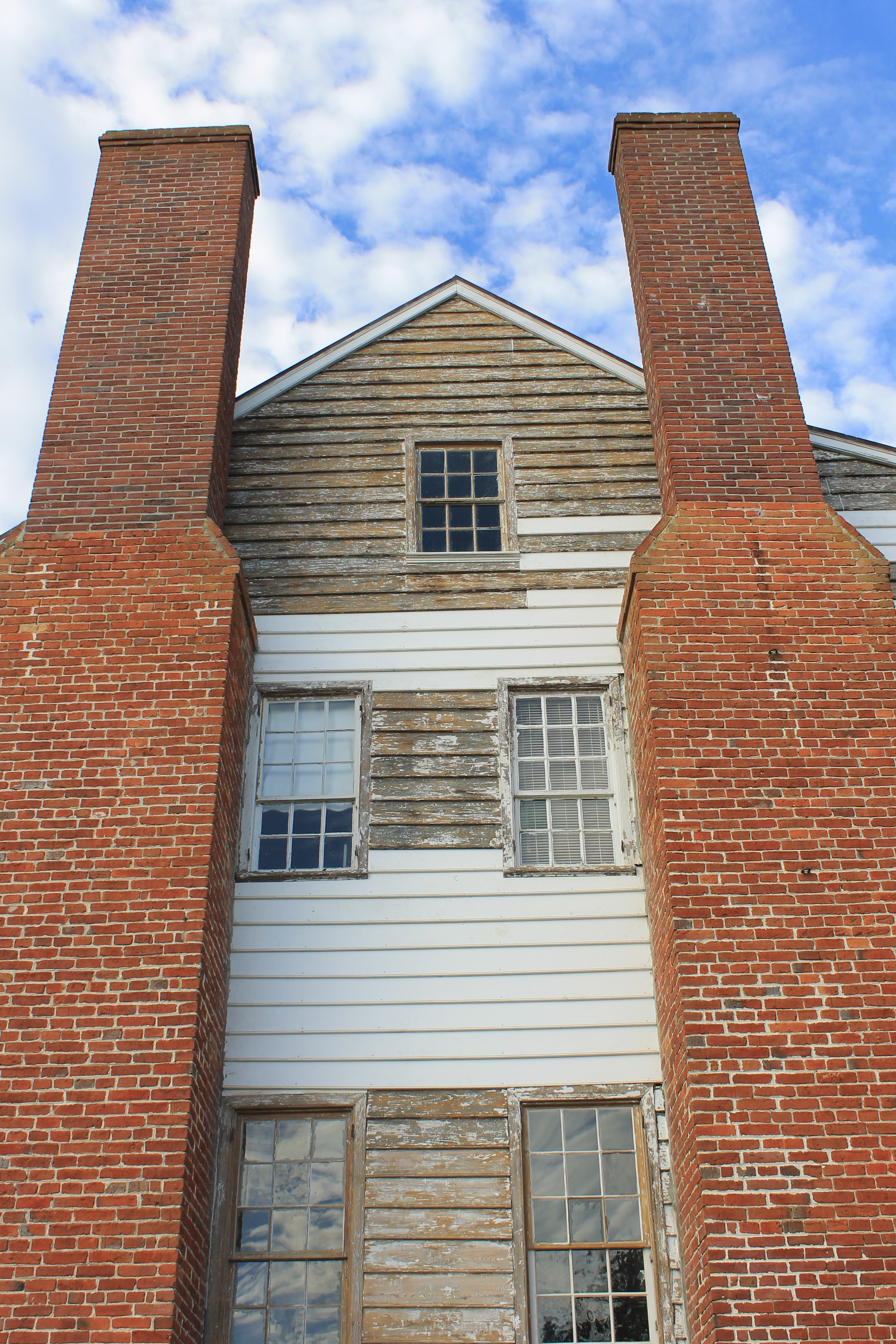
- Barker House, October 2012

- Location within North Carolina Location within the United States
- Location: S Terminus of Broad St., Edenton, North Carolina
- Coordinates: 36°03′22″N 76°36′34″W
- Area: 0.5 acres (0.20 ha)
- Built: c. 1782
- Architectural style: Greek Revival, Georgian, Federal
- NRHP reference No.: 72000931
- Added to NRHP: March 24, 1972

Barker House is a historic home located at Edenton, Chowan County, North Carolina. The original house was built about 1782, and expanded during the 19th century. It is a 2 1/2-story frame dwelling with Georgian, Federal, and Greek Revival style design elements. It sits on a brick foundation and has at both ends a pair of single-shoulder exterior chimneys. The front facade features a full-length, two-tier porch carried on superimposed fluted pillars under a shed roof.

The house commemorates the life of Penelope Barker of Edenton who organized 51 ladies to sign a petition to King George III saying NO to taxation on tea and cloth. Unlike the tea party at Boston, the women at Edenton not only signed their names to the petition but sent it to the King and caused British newspapers to decry the first political demonstration by women in North America.

The Barker House serves as the Welcome Center for Edenton. It is owned, preserved and opened seven days a week (five in the winter) by the Edenton Historical Commission and complements several sites of Historic Edenton. Their other historic sites open for tour include the James Iredell House (home of George Washington's youngest appointee to the first US Supreme Court), the Roanoke River Lighthouse, Chowan County Courthouse (this 1767 courthouse is the oldest in-use courthouse in the country), the Cupola House and St. Paul's Church.

The Barker House was listed on the National Register of Historic Places in 1972.
