= Rocky Mount Academy =

American private school in North Carolina

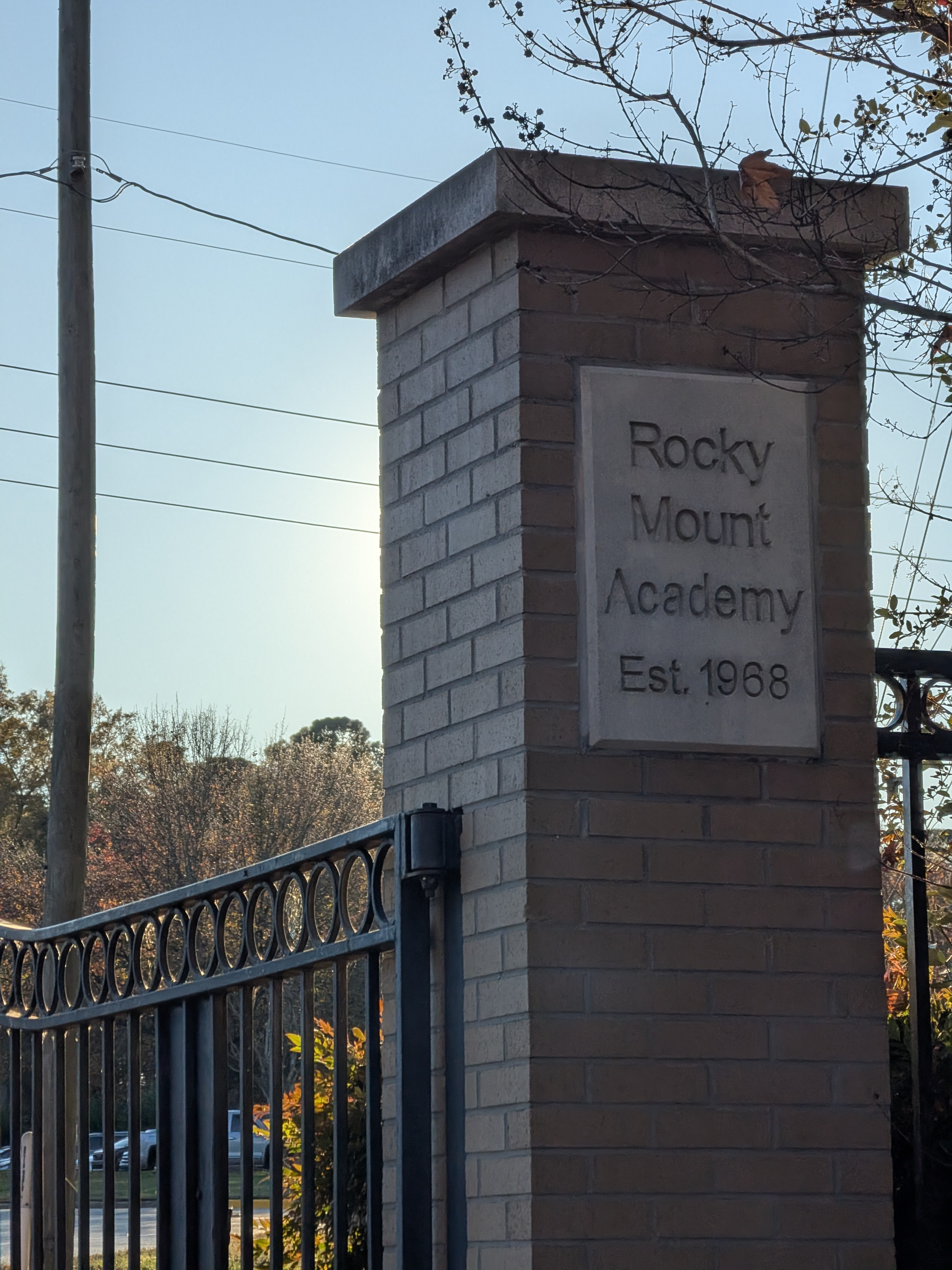

Location
- 1313 Avondale Avenue; Rocky Mount, North Carolina 27803; United States; 35°56′45″N 77°50′46″W

Information
- School type: Private
- Established: October 25, 1968 (57 years ago)
- CEEB code: 343374
- NCES School ID: 01011645
- Head of school: Beth Covolo
- Faculty: 42.9 (FTE)
- Grades: PreK–12
- Enrollment: 460 (2021–22)
- Colors: Navy, Red and White
- Athletics: North Carolina Independent Schools Athletic Association (NCISAA)
- Mascot: Eagle
- Team name: Eagles
- Accreditation: Southern Association of Colleges and Schools
- Website: www.rmacademy.com
- Last updated: 8 January 2018

Rocky Mount Academy is a private school in Rocky Mount, North Carolina, United States. It serves 409 students in grades PK–12.

== History ==
Rocky Mount Academy was founded in 1968 as a segregation academy. In 1975, the New York Times reported that many of the academy's students would prefer to attend racially integrated public schools, but were not permitted to do so by their parents.

== Athletics ==
Rocky Mount Academy won the state championship in both football and soccer in 2017. The girls varsity basketball team also went on to win the North Carolina Independent Schools Athletic Association (NCISAA) Division II state championship in 2025.

== Notable alumni ==
- Adrian H. Wood, American educator and writer
