= Lane House (Edenton, North Carolina) =

Historic house in North Carolina, United States

Coordinates: 36.05882°N 76.603967°W

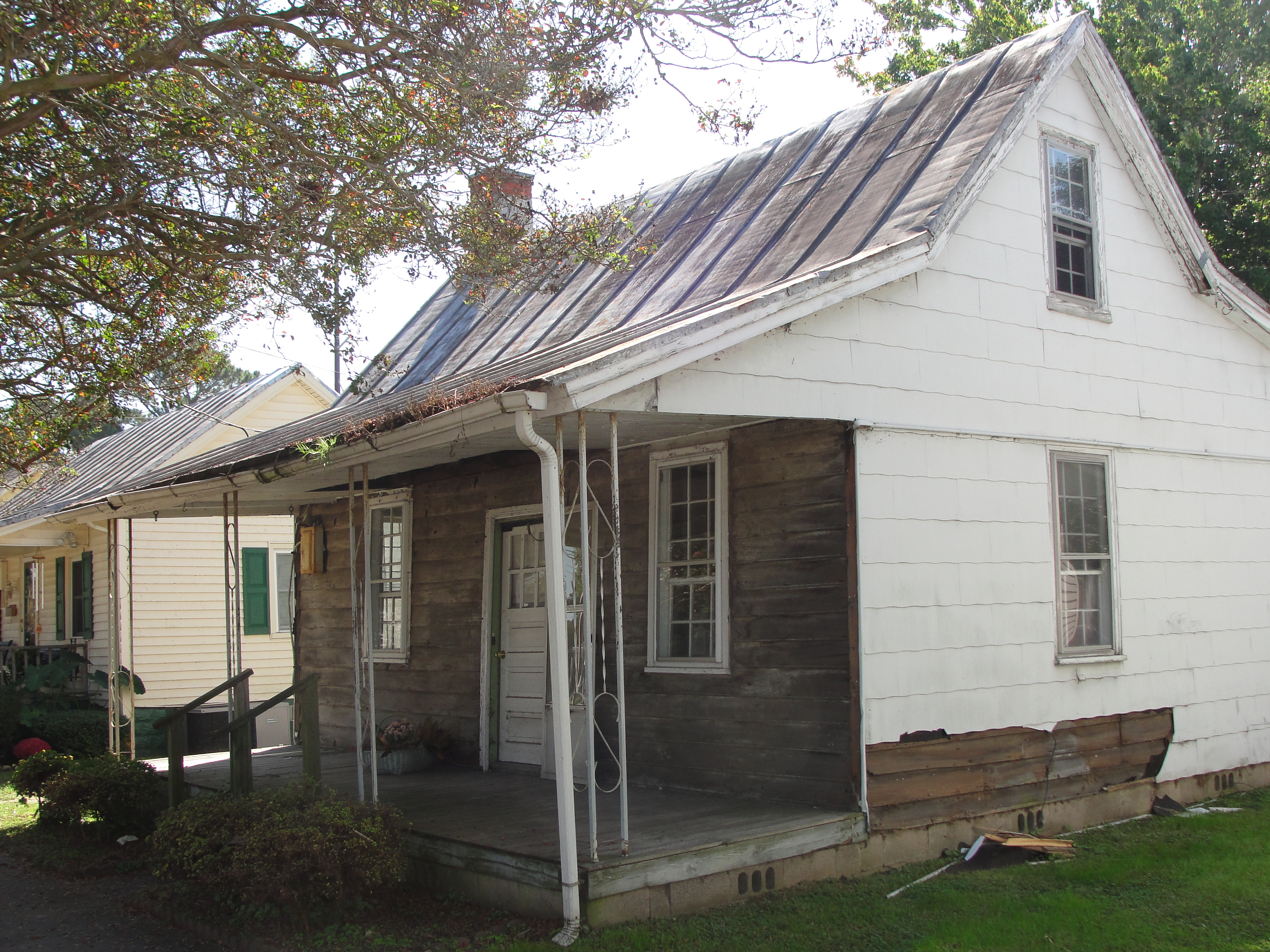
Lane House

Lane House is a historic house in Edenton, North Carolina, United States. It is the oldest house in North Carolina identified by dendrochronology.

The 1 1/2-story house is located within the Edenton National Register Historic District. The earliest part was built 1718–19 and possibly moved to the site from nearby. The house is currently owned by Steve and Linda Lane. During renovations of the house, which they were using as a rental property, the contractor discovered older hand-hewn beams within the structure. Researchers from Williamsburg and elsewhere were contacted to conduct dendrochronological research on the building.

== See also ==
- List of the oldest buildings in North Carolina
