= Cupola House (Edenton, North Carolina) =

Historic house in North Carolina, United States

- U.S. National Register of Historic Places
- U.S. National Historic Landmark
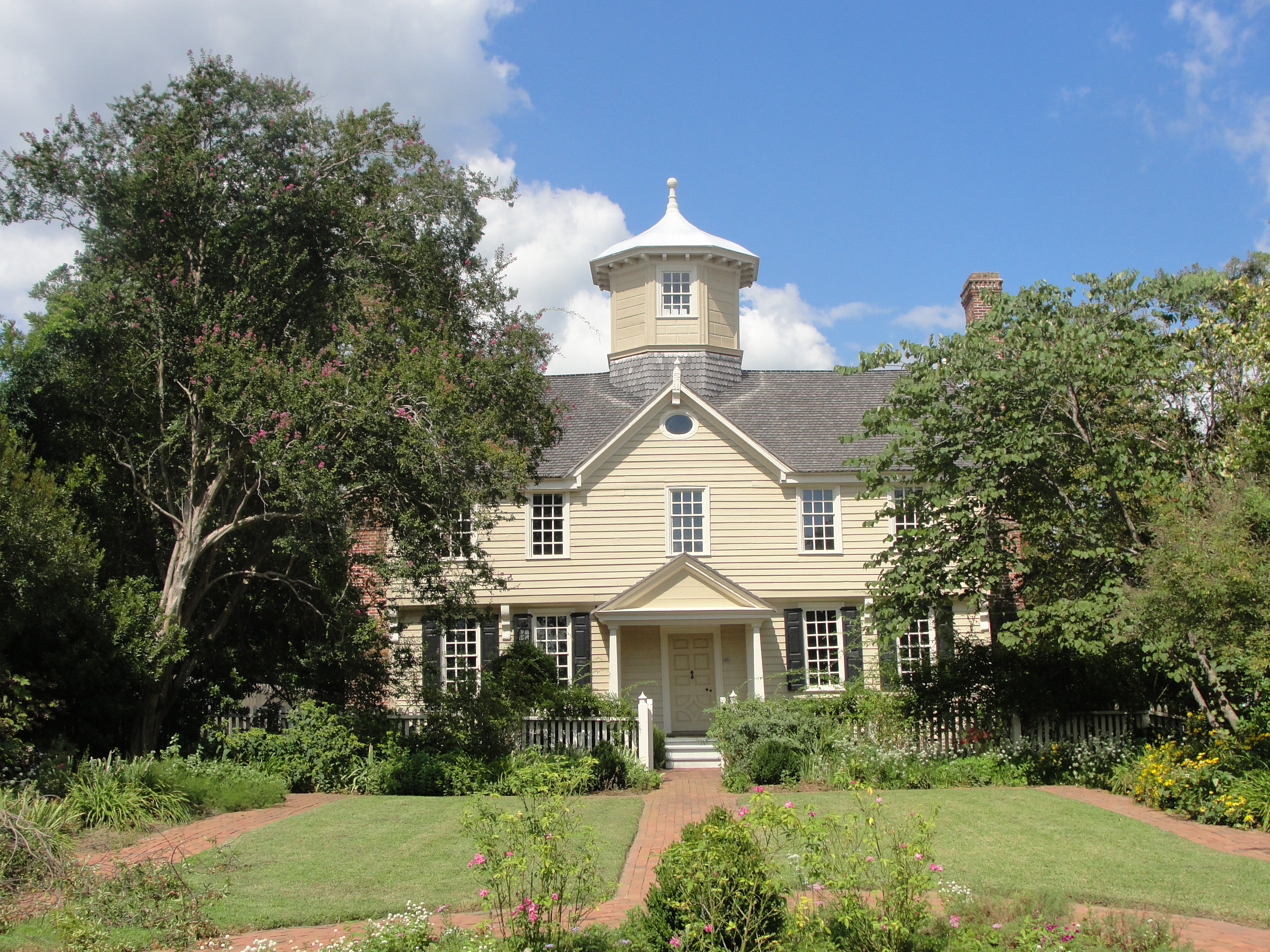
- Cupola House

- Location within North Carolina Location within the United States
- Location: 408 S. Broad St., Edenton, North Carolina
- Coordinates: 36°3′28″N 76°36′38″W
- Built: 1758
- Architect: Francis Corbin
- Architectural style: Colonial, Georgian
- NRHP reference No.: 70000889

Significant dates
- Added to NRHP: April 15, 1970
- Designated NHL: April 15, 1970

The Cupola House is a historic house museum in Edenton, North Carolina. Built in 1756–1758 (as determined by dendrochronology), it is the second oldest building in Edenton, and the only known surviving example in the American South of a "jutt," or overhanging second floor. It was declared a National Historic Landmark in 1970.

== Description and history ==
The Cupola House is a two-story gable-roofed house with external brick end chimneys. It is now covered with weatherboards; recent research suggests it may originally have been covered with rusticated siding, similar to the siding still in place on the cupola. Mount Vernon and the Redwood Library have similar siding. The roof is covered with wooden shingles. Two main rooms flank a central passage, which was an uncommon layout in colonial North Carolina but was not rare in other colonies. The unique aspect of the house is its combination of a cupola with an overhanging upper story. The cupola is octagon-shaped and covered in wood that has been cut to imitate stonework.

Inside, the house features elaborate finishing which denotes the "social hierarchy" of the rooms. The stair brackets of the staircase in the central hallway feature carved floral decorations and moldings, while the doors leading to the two main rooms are surmounted by pediments. The house includes ornate mantels and woodwork on first and second floors. The cupola is reached from the attic by a "barrel stair," a spiral stair framed within vertical wood sheathing that looks like a large barrel.

The house lot was originally more spacious, extending to Edenton Bay. The property was owned by a succession of merchants, including Richard Sanderson, a shipowner. Francis Corbin, the Earl of Granville's land agent, bought the lot in 1756 and built the current residence.

The Cupola House is one of several sites of historic Edenton. Other historic sites open for tour include the James Iredell House, Roanoke River Light, Barker House, Chowan County Courthouse and St. Paul's Church.

== See also ==
- List of National Historic Landmarks in North Carolina
- National Register of Historic Places listings in Chowan County, North Carolina
