= Edenton Peanut Factory =

Historic industrial building in North Carolina, US

- U.S. National Register of Historic Places
- Location within North Carolina Location within the United States
- Location: E. Church St., Edenton, North Carolina
- Coordinates: 36°3′39″N 76°31′7″W
- Area: 4.9 acres (2.0 ha)
- Built: c. 1909
- NRHP reference No.: 79003328
- Added to NRHP: September 20, 1979

Edenton Peanut Factory, also known as Edenton Peanut Company, is a historic peanut factory building located at Edenton, Chowan County, North Carolina. It was built about 1909, and is a five-story, brick factory building with a six-story elevator tower and attached engine room. Also on the property is a contributing storage warehouse.

It was listed on the National Register of Historic Places in 1979.
