= Mulberry Plantation =

Mulberry Plantation could mean:

- Mulberry Plantation (Moncks Corner, South Carolina)
- Mulberry Plantation (Kershaw County, South Carolina), near Camden, South Carolina
- Mulberry Grove Plantation, Fort Wentworth, Savannah, Georgia.
