= Edenton Historic District =

Historic district in North Carolina, United States

- U.S. National Register of Historic Places
- U.S. Historic district
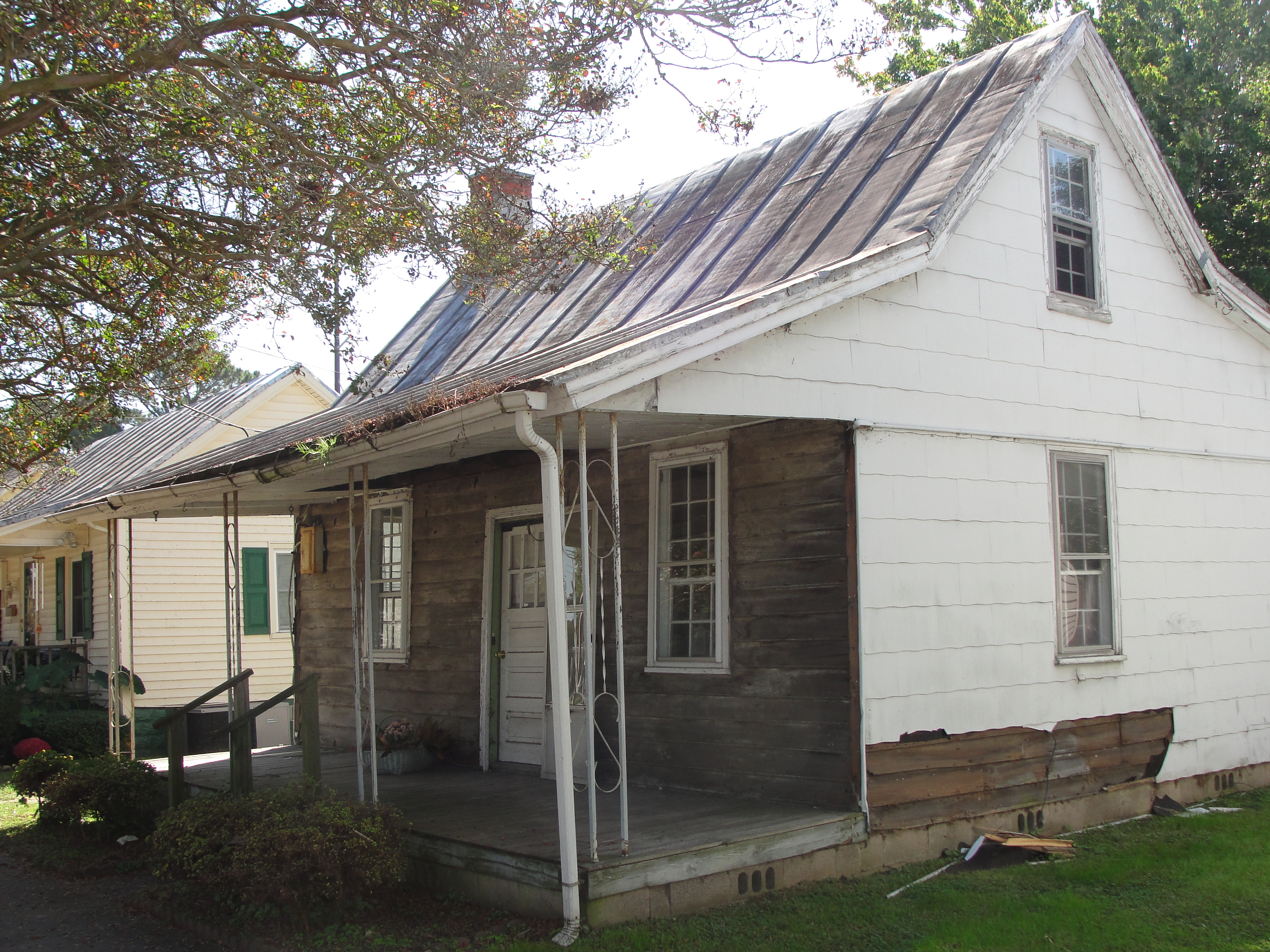
- Lane House

- Location within North Carolina Location within the United States
- Location: Roughly bounded by E. and W. Freemason, S. Oakum, E. and W. Water, and Mosely Sts.; also both sides of the 300 block of E. King St.; also roughly bounded by Filberts Creek, W. Hicks St., Park Ave., the railroad right of way, and the original Edenton Historic District, Edenton, North Carolina
- Coordinates: 36°03′35″N 76°36′37″W
- Built: 1774
- Architect: Hawks, John; Et al.
- Architectural style: Mixed (more Than 2 Styles From Different Periods)
- NRHP reference No.: 73001316 (original); 01001075 (increase 1); 07001010 (increase 2)

Significant dates
- Added to NRHP: July 16, 1973
- Boundary increases: October 5, 2001; September 28, 2007

Edenton Historic District is a national historic district located at Edenton, Chowan County, North Carolina. The district encompasses 342 contributing buildings, 4 contributing sites, and 3 contributing structures. It includes several buildings that are individually listed on the National Register. The Lane House (ca. 1718), possibly the oldest surviving house in North Carolina, is owned by Steve and Linda Lane and is located within the district. Also located in the district are the Dixon-Powell House, William Leary House, and Louis Ziegler House designed by architect George Franklin Barber.

It was listed on the National Register of Historic Places in 1973, with boundary increases in 2001 and 2007.
