= Mulberry Hill (Edenton, North Carolina) =

Historic house in North Carolina, United States

- U.S. National Register of Historic Places
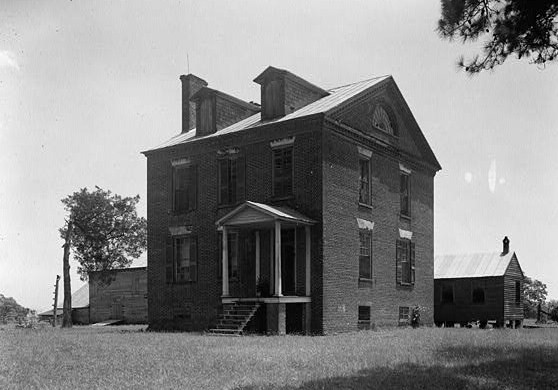
- Mulberry Hill, HABS Photo, June 1940

- Location within North Carolina Location within the United States
- Location: SE of Edenton on SR 1114, near Edenton, North Carolina
- Coordinates: 36°0′38″N 76°32′11″W
- Area: 6 acres (2.4 ha)
- Built: c. 1810
- Architectural style: Federal
- NRHP reference No.: 76001314
- Added to NRHP: May 13, 1976

Mulberry Hill is a historic plantation house located near Edenton, Chowan County, North Carolina. It was built about 1810, and is a 2 1/2-story, three-bay, Federal-style brick dwelling with a side-hall plan. Its brickwork is laid in Flemish bond.

It was listed on the National Register of Historic Places in 1976.
