= Mulberry Grove =

Mulberry Grove may refer to:

- Mulberry Grove, Georgia
- Mulberry Grove Plantation, Port Wentworth, Georgia, listed on the NRHP in Georgia
- Mulberry Grove, Illinois
- Mulberry Grove (Charles County, Maryland) listed on the NRHP in Charles County, Maryland
- Mulberry Grove (Monroe, Louisiana), listed on the NRHP in Louisiana
- Mulberry Grove (White Castle, Louisiana), listed on the NRHP in Louisiana
- Mulberry Grove (Ahoskie, North Carolina), listed on the NRHP in North Carolina
- Mulberry Grove (Brownsburg, Virginia), listed on the NRHP in Virginia
