= St. Paul's Church (Edenton, North Carolina) =

Historic church in North Carolina, United States

St. Paul's Church, Edenton
- The Parish Church of St. Paul, Edenton
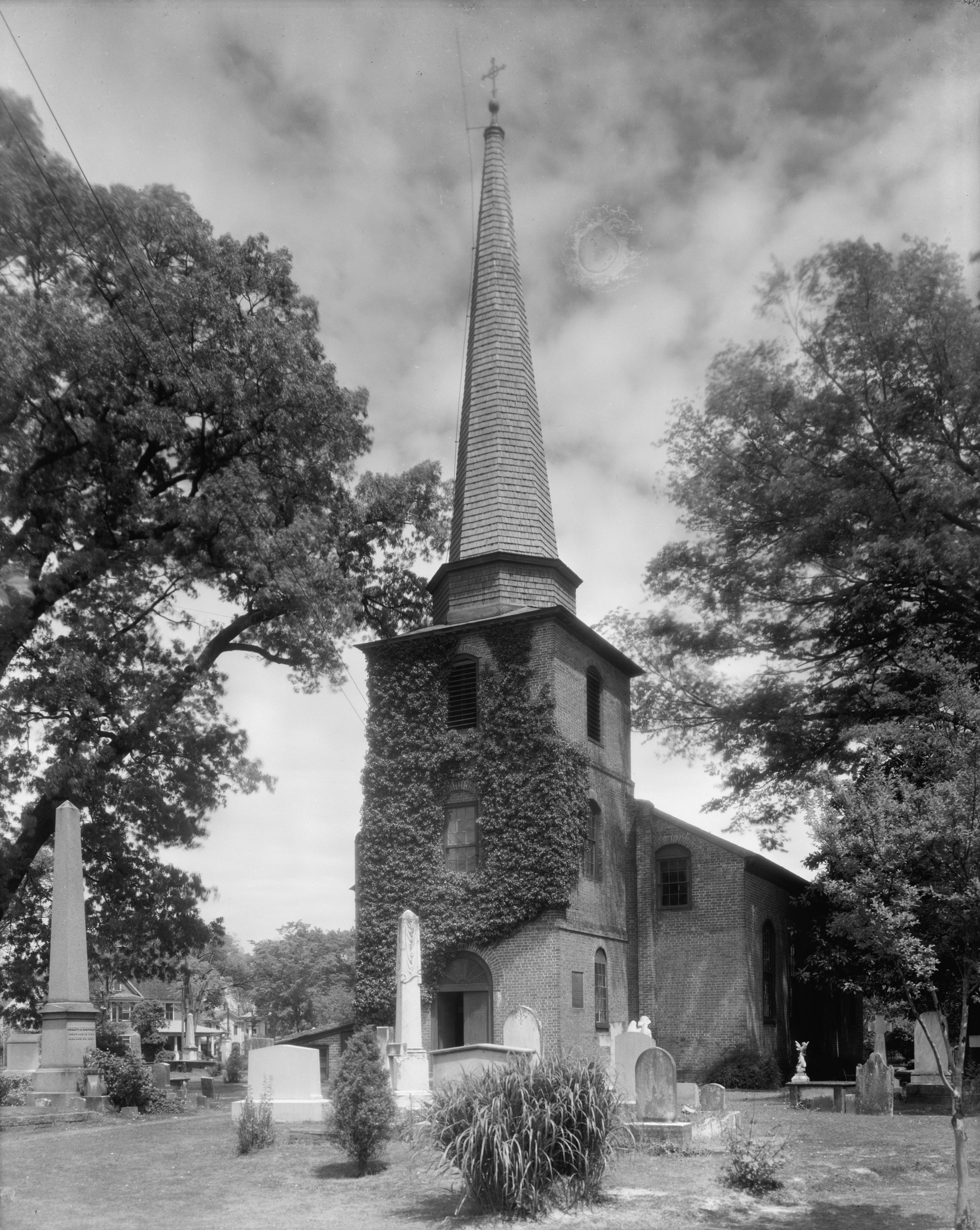
- Main façade of St. Paul's Church in 1937
- St. Paul's Church, Edenton
- 36.061278°N 76.608833°W
- Location: 100 West Church Street, Edenton, North Carolina
- Country: United States
- Denomination: Episcopal
- Tradition: Anglican
- Website: www.stpedenton.org

History
- Status: Parish church
- Founded: November 12, 1701
- Founder: North Carolina General Assembly
- Dedication: St. Paul

Architecture
- Functional status: Active
- Architect: William Nichols
- Style: Georgian
- Years built: 1736–1760
- Completed: April 10, 1760

Specifications
- Materials: Brick

Administration
- Province: Sewanee
- Diocese: East Carolina
- Deanery: Albemarle
- Parish: Edenton; St. Paul

Clergy
- Bishop: Robert Skirving
- Rector: The Rev. Melody Perdue
- St. Paul's Episcopal Church and Churchyard
- U.S. National Register of Historic Places
- Area: 2 acres (0.81 ha)
- NRHP reference No.: 75001248
- Added to NRHP: May 29, 1975

St. Paul's Church, Edenton, is a historic parish church in Edenton, North Carolina. The building, which dates from 1760, is listed on the National Register of Historic Places. The churchyard has the tombs of governors Charles Eden (1673–1722), Thomas Pollock (1654–1722), and Gabriel Johnston (1699–1752).

The congregation reported 434 members in 2015 and 514 members in 2023; no membership statistics were reported in 2024 parochial reports. Plate and pledge income reported for the congregation in 2024 was $564,850. Average Sunday attendance (ASA) in 2024 was 134 persons. This was a relative decrease from ASA of 182 reported in 2016.

== Services ==
On Sundays the church holds a breakfast, Christian education, and two morning services – Rite I & II.

== History ==
St. Paul's Parish was established in 1701 by the Vestry Act of 1701, passed by the General Assembly. The law divided North Carolina into five districts or parishes, and granted each parish a vestry with the authority to tax landowners to build churches and help the underprivileged. In December of 1701, the vestry met in the house of Thomas Gilliam, near where the town of Edenton would be. The vestry decided to construct a small wooden church on land donated by Edward Smithwick, now part of the Hayes Plantation.For almost seventy-five years, it was under the care of the Society for the Propagation of the Gospel, formed by the Rev. Thomas Bray.

The oldest material possessions of St. Paul’s are its book of vestry minutes begun in 1701, and a silver chalice and paten given to the church by Edward Moseley in 1725.

The churchyard predates the church building by about fifteen years, serving as the town's cemetery.

Construction began on a permanent replacement in 1736 after the incorporation of Edenton in 1722. This new location was within the city. During this period of construction on February 25, 1744, the Rev. Clement Hall was appointed the rector of the church. During Hall's tenure as rector, the parish was given its current name. Due to insufficient funding the building was left exposed to the elements until the roof was completed in 1748. Hall never used the church for Sunday services, dying in 1759 before building's completion. After his death, he was replaced by the Rev. Daniel Earl as rector. The final phase of construction ended in 1774.

During the eighteenth century, St. Paul's called some of North Carolina's most important political leaders its members. Some of these include governors Samuel Johnston and James Iredell Jr. Johnson served as the warden of St. Paul's for many years. Joseph Hewes, one of North Carolina's three signers of the Declaration of Independence, served as a vestryman before the American Revolutionary War. Additionally, members of the church included Thomas and Penelope Barker, who were often regarded as the leaders of the Edenton Tea Party.

On June 19, 1776, the vestry, professing their loyalty to the king, in defiance against British Parliament alongside the North Carolina Provincial Congress The church had fallen into disrepair by the 1790s and was only used for occasional services.

In 1806, after years of disrepair following the Revolutionary War, English architect William Nichols led the effort to renovate the church, adding a new spire and a revitalizing its interior.

The church plays a significant part in Harriet Jacobs's family life. The baptism of her daughter, Louisa Matilda, in St. Paul's is covered in some detail in her slave narrative, Incidents in the Life of a Slave Girl.

In 1879, construction began for a church intended for the black congregants of St. Paul's Church. Hebert H. Page funded the building of the church, and the Bishop of the Episcopal Diocese of North Carolina, the Rt. Rev. Theodore B. Lyman organized and consecrated the building on April 6, 1881. Violent winds destroyed this building just three years later, in 1884. A new church began in the following year, but was not consecrated until 1897.

A steel roof was added in 1949, following a fire that had almost destroyed the church. The structure was rebuilt using measured drawings from the Historic American Buildings Survey, the findings of an architectural survey team led by Charles E. Patterson in 1933, as a guide.

St. Paul's was added to the NRHP in 1975.

St. John the Evangelist closed in 2011.

== Architecture ==
St. Paul's Church is a five-bay, brick church building with a gable roof. It features a slightly engaged square tower. The brickwork is laid in Flemish bond. It is the second oldest church building in North Carolina, and the only colonial church still in regular parish use. The interior was restored to its 19th-century appearance following a fire in 1949.

== See also ==
- List of Anglican churches
- List of the oldest buildings in North Carolina
