= Edenton, North Carolina =

- Town
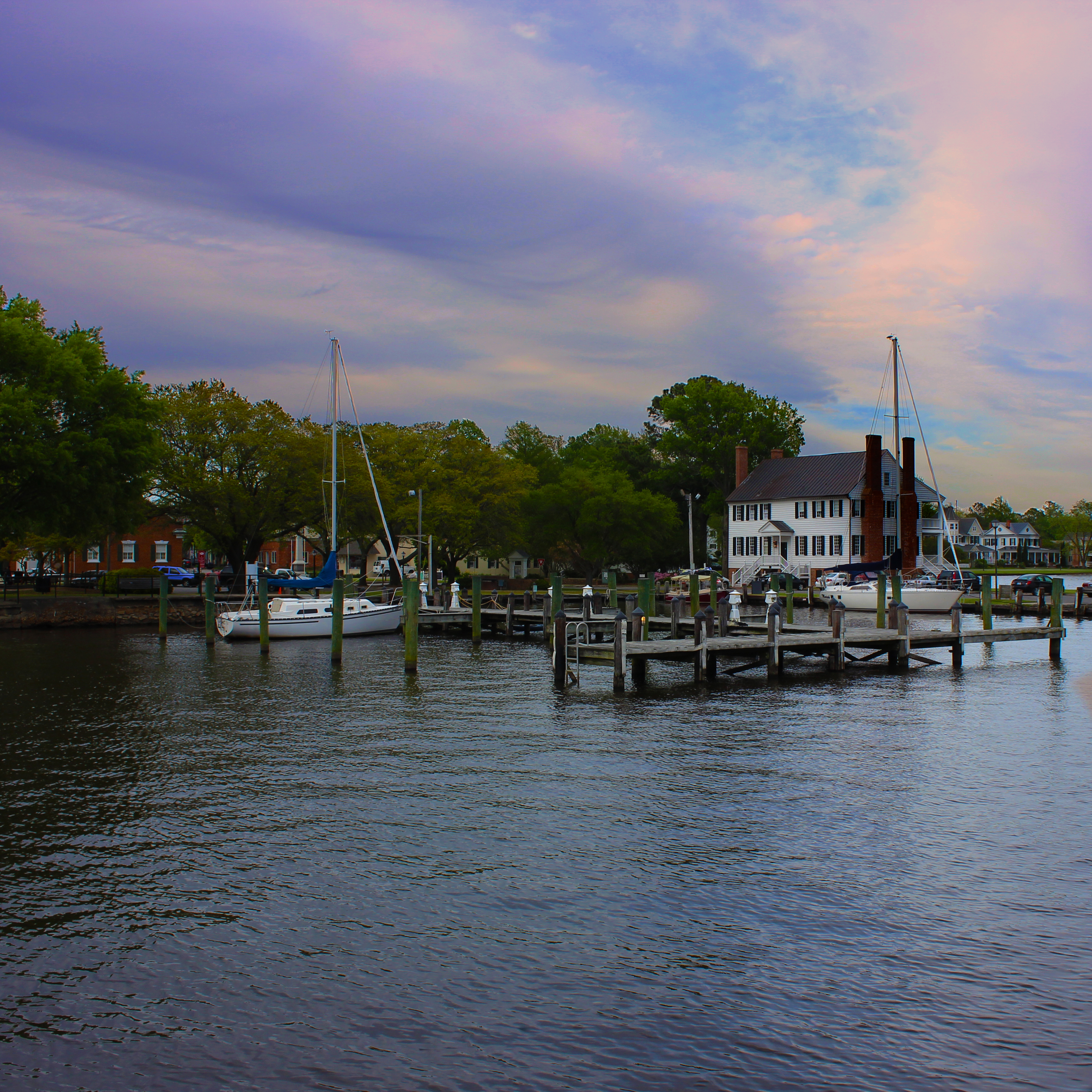
- Downtown Edenton Waterfront

- Flag Seal

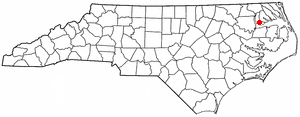
- Location of Edenton, North Carolina
- Coordinates: 36°03′29″N 76°36′03″W
- Country: United States
- State: North Carolina
- County: Chowan
- Incorporated: 1722
- Named for: Charles Eden

Government
  - Mayor: W. Hackney High Jr
  - Town Manager: Corey Gooden

Area
  - Total: 5.57 sq mi (14.43 km^{2})
  - Land: 5.37 sq mi (13.92 km^{2})
  - Water: 0.20 sq mi (0.51 km^{2})
- Elevation: 13 ft (4.0 m)

Population (2020)
  - Total: 4,460
  - Density: 830/sq mi (320.4/km^{2})
- Time zone: UTC-5 (Eastern (EST))
  - Summer (DST): UTC-4 (EDT)
- ZIP code: 27932
- Area code: 252
- FIPS code: 37-20120
- GNIS feature ID: 2406422
- Website: www.townofedenton.com

The town of Edenton is located on the Albemarle Sound in North Carolina, United States, in the Inner Banks region. It is the county seat of Chowan County. The population was 4,397 at the 2020 census.

Edenton served as the first capital of North Carolina, during the colonial era as the Province of North Carolina, though other than housing the governor's official residence, it did not have other governmental functions. It served as capital from 1722 to 1743, when the capital was moved to Brunswick. The town was the site of the Edenton Tea Party, a protest organized by several Edenton women in 1774 in solidarity with the organizers of the Boston Tea Party. It was the birthplace of Harriet Jacobs, an enslaved African American whose 1861 autobiography, Incidents in the Life of a Slave Girl, is now considered an American classic.

In the late 1980s and into the 1990s, Edenton was the site of a controversial and heavily reported sexual abuse trial and overturned conviction, what ultimately became North Carolina’s longest and most costly criminal trial — during what has been described as a period of widespread day-care sex-abuse hysteria.

Edenton's local economy is primarily driven by tourism, and the town is a popular retirement location.

== History ==
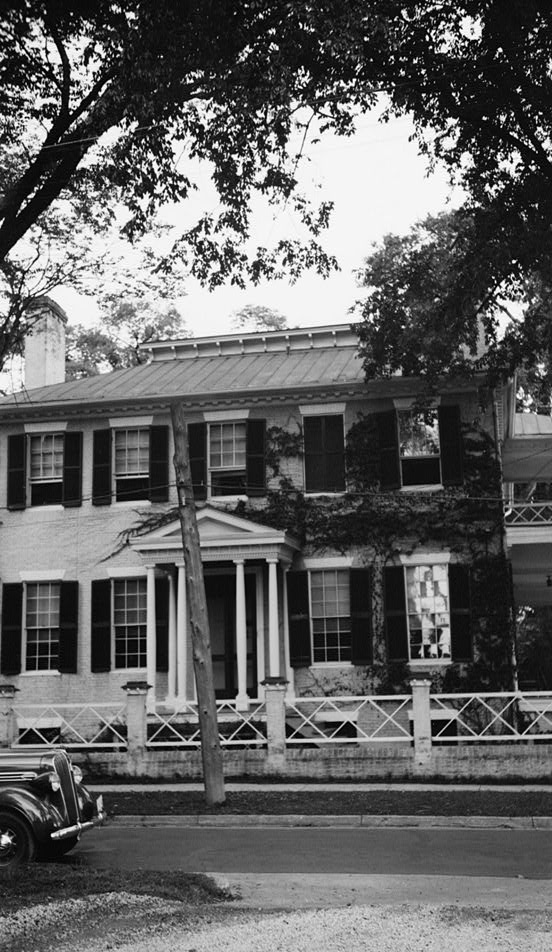
Beverley Hall, Edenton, 1937

=== Edenton Colony ===
In 1658, adventurers from the Jamestown area drifted through the wilderness from Virginia and found a location on the northern shore of a small natural harbor at 36.045°N 76.615°W, now called Edenton Bay. Edenton Colony was the first permanent European settlement in what is now the state of North Carolina.

Edenton was established in 1712 as "the Towne on Queen Anne's Creek". It was later known as "Ye Towne on Mattercommack Creek" and still later as "the Port of Roanoke". It was renamed "Edenton" and incorporated in 1722 in honor of Governor Charles Eden, who had died that year.

=== Historic Edenton ===
Edenton served as the second capital of the Province of North Carolina, from 1722 to 1743, with the governor establishing his residence there and the population increasing during that period.

William Byrd II, who visited the town in March 1729, provides a description of Edenton in his The History of the Dividing Line:

This town is Situated on the north side of Albermarle Sound which is there about 5 miles over. A Dirty Slash runs all along the Back of it, which in the Summer is a foul annoyance, and furnishes abundance of that Carolina plague, musquetas. There may be 40 or 50 Houses, most of them Small, built without Expense. A Citizen here is counted Extravagant, if he has Ambition enough to aspire to a Brick-chimney. Justice herself is but indifferently Lodged, the Court-House having much the Air of a Common Tobacco-House. I believe this is the only metropolis in the Christian or Mohametan world where there is neither Church, Chapel, Mosque, Synagogue, nor any other Place of Publick Worship of any Sect or Religion whatsoever. What little Devotion there may be is much more private than their vices.

A landmark in women's history occurred in Edenton in 1774. Fifty-one women in Edenton, led by Penelope Barker, signed a protest petition agreeing to boycott English tea and other products, in what became known, decades later, as the Edenton Tea Party. The Edenton Tea Party is the first known political action by women in the British American colonies. In fact it so shocked London that newspapers published etchings depicting the women as uncontrollable. Her home, the Barker House, is open seven days a week, without a fee, and is considered by many as Edenton's living room.

Joseph Hewes, a resident of Edenton and successful owner of a merchant marine fleet, was appointed the first Secretary of the Navy in 1776. John Adams said that Hewes "laid the foundation, the cornerstone of the American Navy." Hewes also signed the United States Declaration of Independence.

James Iredell, also of Edenton, was at 38 the youngest member of the first United States Supreme Court. He was appointed by George Washington. His son James Iredell Jr., served as the Democratic-Republican governor of North Carolina and then became a United States senator. His home may be toured through the Historic Edenton Visitors Center.

Easy sea access halted with a 1795 hurricane which silted Roanoke Inlet. Completion of the 1805 Dismal Swamp Canal took business elsewhere by diverting shipping to Norfolk, Virginia. Locals rejected construction of a railroad, a lack that impeded the local economy.

Supreme Court Justice James Wilson, a signer of both the Declaration of Independence and the United States Constitution, died in Edenton on August 21, 1798, at age 55, while riding his judicial circuit.

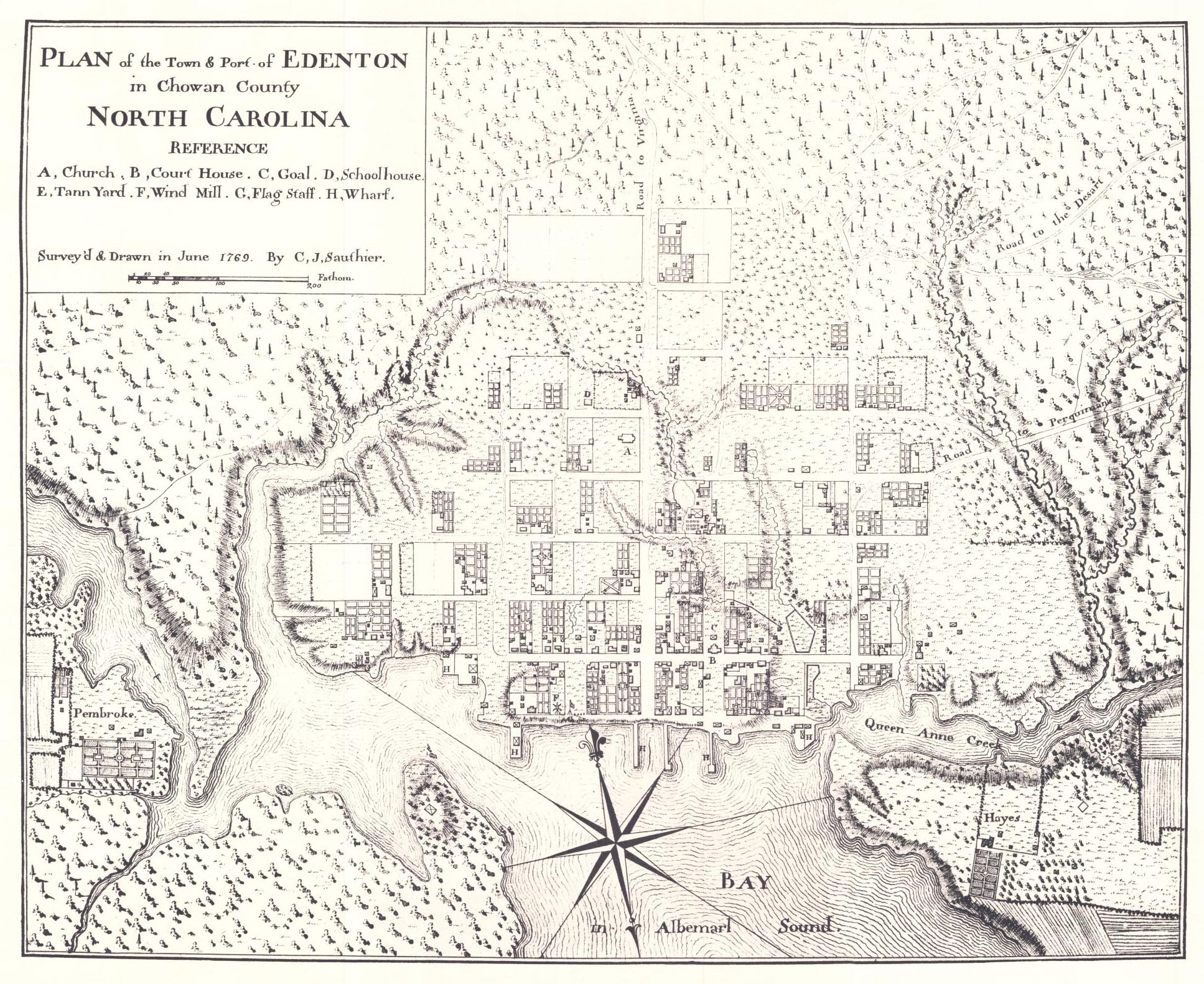
Plan of the Town and Port of Edenton in Chowan County, North Carolina, 1769

Harriet Jacobs and her brother John were born into slavery in Edenton in 1813 and 1815, respectively. They, and later Harriet's children, were baptized at St.Paul's. Their early childhood was centered around Horniblow's tavern, the town's only colonial hotel, on the northern side of East King Street, just west of Chowan County Courthouse. Twelve-year old John Jacobs was sold at public auction in 1828, probably at Market House (junction Water Street / Broad Street). Both siblings became enslaved to an abusive master, the local physician, Dr. James Norcom, living with him at his house on West Eden Street. In 1835, Harriet Jacobs went into hiding in the house of her grandmother, a freedwoman, on the northern side of West King Street, a few steps from Broad Street. She famously had to stay there concealed in a crawl space for seven years before she was finally able to escape to New York, where she wrote Incidents in the Life of a Slave Girl, now considered an "American classic".

In 1862, during the Civil War, the Albemarle Artillery was recruited at Edenton by a local attorney named William Badham Jr. Its guns were cast from bronze bells taken from courthouse and churches in the Edenton area. Known as the Edenton Bell Battery, its four howitzers were named the Columbia, St. Paul, Fannie Roulac, and Edenton. Two of the guns, the St. Paul and Edenton, have been returned to Edenton and can now be seen at Edenton's waterfront park.

Edenton enjoyed an economic revival beginning in 1890 led by lumbering, an 1898 cotton mill, and a 1909 peanut-processing plant. The J. H. Leary building, constructed in 1894, was owned by Josephine Leary, an African American real estate entrepreneur.

Edenton is the home of the 1886 Roanoke River Lighthouse. The lighthouse is called a screw-pile design because of its original support system. Each piling was literally screwed into the river or sound bottom so they would not pull out in heavy storms and hurricanes. The Roanoke River Lighthouse, now located at Edenton, is believed to be the last extant example in the United States of a rectangular frame building built for a screw-pile base. The lighthouse was in commission from 1887 until 1941.

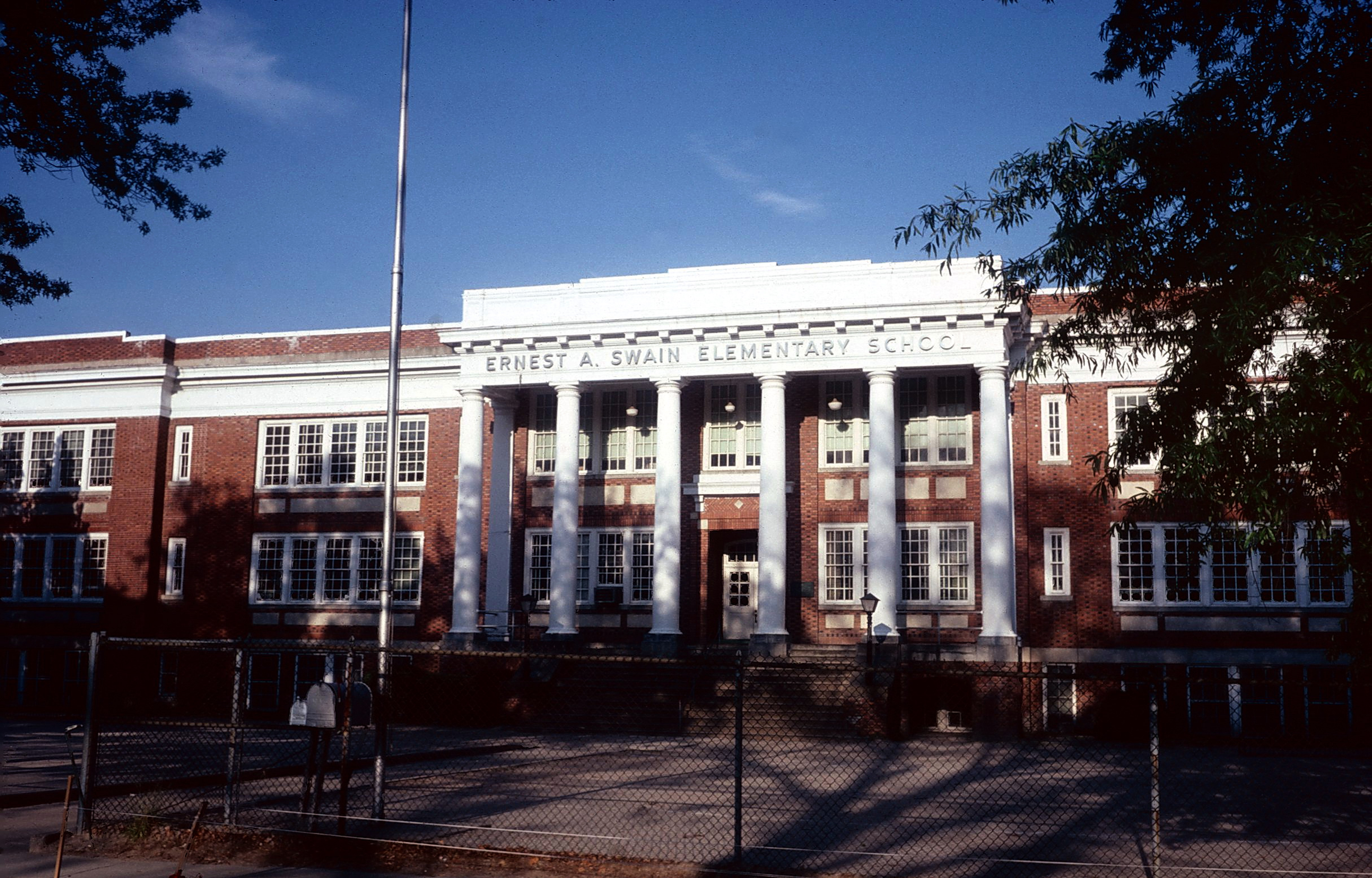
Former high school, later elementary school, today Swain Apartments, 101 Court Street

Edenton is home to numerous early houses and public buildings, including the Cupola House. It was designated a National Historic Landmark in 1970, a designation also accorded the 1776 Chowan County Courthouse. The courthouse is still used for official court events. The city is home to the oldest house still in existence in North Carolina, constructed in 1719 before the establishment of the city.

Edenton achieved international notoriety for the Little Rascals Day Care sexual abuse case, the subject of journalist Ofra Bikel's award-winning trilogy of Frontline documentaries: Innocence Lost (1991), Innocence Lost: The Verdict (1993), and Innocence Lost: The Plea (1997).

== Geography ==
Edenton is located in southern Chowan County sits at the north end of Edenton Bay, just north of the confluence of the Chowan and Roanoke rivers, which forms Albemarle Sound.

U.S. Route 17, a four-lane expressway, runs along the northern border of the town, with access from five exits. US 17 leads northeast 27 mi (43 km) to Elizabeth City and southwest 37 mi (60 km) to Williamston. Nags Head on the Outer Banks is 72 mi (116 km) to the east by road, and Raleigh, the state capital, is 136 mi (219 km) to the west.

According to the United States Census Bureau, Edenton has a total area of 5.6 sq mi (14.4 km^{2}), of which 5.4 sq mi (13.9 km^{2}) is land and 0.19 sq mi (0.5 km^{2}), or 3.55%, is water.

== Climate ==
Climate data for Edenton, North Carolina (1991–2020 normals, extremes 1896–present)
Month	Jan	Feb	Mar	Apr	May	Jun	Jul	Aug	Sep	Oct	Nov	Dec	Year
Record high °F (°C)	80 (27)	83 (28)	90 (32)	95 (35)	98 (37)	102 (39)	105 (41)	104 (40)	99 (37)	95 (35)	88 (31)	87 (31)	105 (41)
Mean maximum °F (°C)	70.1 (21.2)	72.7 (22.6)	80.3 (26.8)	85.3 (29.6)	90.3 (32.4)	94.2 (34.6)	95.9 (35.5)	93.8 (34.3)	90.1 (32.3)	84.0 (28.9)	77.1 (25.1)	70.7 (21.5)	96.9 (36.1)
Mean daily maximum °F (°C)	52.4 (11.3)	56.0 (13.3)	63.0 (17.2)	72.2 (22.3)	79.3 (26.3)	86.1 (30.1)	89.0 (31.7)	86.8 (30.4)	81.5 (27.5)	72.6 (22.6)	62.9 (17.2)	55.3 (12.9)	71.4 (21.9)
Daily mean °F (°C)	43.4 (6.3)	45.9 (7.7)	52.3 (11.3)	61.4 (16.3)	69.4 (20.8)	77.0 (25.0)	80.5 (26.9)	78.7 (25.9)	73.3 (22.9)	63.4 (17.4)	53.4 (11.9)	46.5 (8.1)	62.1 (16.7)
Mean daily minimum °F (°C)	34.4 (1.3)	35.8 (2.1)	41.5 (5.3)	50.6 (10.3)	59.4 (15.2)	67.9 (19.9)	72.0 (22.2)	70.6 (21.4)	65.1 (18.4)	54.1 (12.3)	44.0 (6.7)	37.8 (3.2)	52.8 (11.6)
Mean minimum °F (°C)	16.1 (−8.8)	20.3 (−6.5)	25.5 (−3.6)	33.7 (0.9)	44.2 (6.8)	54.1 (12.3)	61.9 (16.6)	60.2 (15.7)	51.6 (10.9)	37.6 (3.1)	27.9 (−2.3)	22.8 (−5.1)	14.4 (−9.8)
Record low °F (°C)	−4 (−20)	0 (−18)	15 (−9)	21 (−6)	35 (2)	45 (7)	47 (8)	46 (8)	38 (3)	24 (−4)	16 (−9)	5 (−15)	−4 (−20)
Average precipitation inches (mm)	3.50 (89)	3.24 (82)	4.03 (102)	3.27 (83)	3.72 (94)	4.92 (125)	6.04 (153)	6.16 (156)	5.62 (143)	3.75 (95)	3.24 (82)	3.49 (89)	50.98 (1,295)
Average snowfall inches (cm)	0.9 (2.3)	0.6 (1.5)	0.0 (0.0)	0.0 (0.0)	0.0 (0.0)	0.0 (0.0)	0.0 (0.0)	0.0 (0.0)	0.0 (0.0)	0.0 (0.0)	0.0 (0.0)	0.8 (2.0)	2.3 (5.8)
Average precipitation days (≥ 0.01 in)	8.8	8.2	8.7	8.1	8.8	8.2	10.1	9.3	8.0	6.3	7.0	7.8	99.3
Average snowy days (≥ 0.1 in)	0.4	0.4	0.0	0.0	0.0	0.0	0.0	0.0	0.0	0.0	0.0	0.2	1.0
Source: NOAA

== Demographics ==
Historical population
Census	Pop.	Note	%±
1790	1,575		—
1850	1,607		—
1860	1,504		−6.4%
1870	1,243		−17.4%
1880	1,382		11.2%
1890	2,205		59.6%
1900	3,046		38.1%
1910	2,789		−8.4%
1920	2,777		−0.4%
1930	3,563		28.3%
1940	3,835		7.6%
1950	4,468		16.5%
1960	4,458		−0.2%
1970	4,956		11.2%
1980	5,357		8.1%
1990	5,268		−1.7%
2000	5,394		2.4%
2010	5,004		−7.2%
2020	4,460		−10.9%
2021 (est.)	4,391	▼	−1.5%
U.S. Decennial Census

=== 2020 census ===
As of the 2020 census, Edenton had a population of 4,460. The median age was 48.8 years. 20.3% of residents were under the age of 18 and 29.0% of residents were 65 years of age or older. For every 100 females there were 80.6 males, and for every 100 females age 18 and over there were 74.8 males age 18 and over.

97.1% of residents lived in urban areas, while 2.9% lived in rural areas.

There were 1,942 households in Edenton, of which 26.3% had children under the age of 18 living in them. Of all households, 32.2% were married-couple households, 18.0% were households with a male householder and no spouse or partner present, and 46.2% were households with a female householder and no spouse or partner present. About 37.5% of all households were made up of individuals and 19.3% had someone living alone who was 65 years of age or older.

There were 2,449 housing units, of which 20.7% were vacant. The homeowner vacancy rate was 3.8% and the rental vacancy rate was 12.6%.

Edenton racial composition
Race	Number	Percentage
White (non-Hispanic)	1,771	39.71%
Black or African American (non-Hispanic)	2,335	52.35%
Native American	15	0.34%
Asian	23	0.52%
Pacific Islander	1	0.02%
Other/Mixed	126	2.83%
Hispanic or Latino	189	4.24%

=== 2000 census ===
As of the census of 2000, there were 5,394 people, 1,983 households, and 1,294 families residing in the town. The population density was 1,076.3 inhabitants per square mile (415.6/km^{2}). There were 2,204 housing units at an average density of 439.8 per square mile (169.8/km^{2}). The racial makeup of the town was 42.86% White, 55.23% African American, 0.20% Native American, 0.63% Asian, 0.02% Pacific Islander, 0.44% from other races, and 0.61% from two or more races. Hispanic or Latino of any race were 1.45% of the population.

There were 1,983 households, out of which 30.0% had children under the age of 18 living with them, 38.0% were married couples living together, 24.7% had a female householder with no husband present, and 34.7% were non-families. 31.4% of all households were made up of individuals, and 16.4% had someone living alone who was 65 years of age or older. The average household size was 2.37 and the average family size was 2.95.

In the town, the population was spread out, with 23.7% under the age of 18, 14.3% from 18 to 24, 21.3% from 25 to 44, 20.2% from 45 to 64, and 20.5% who were 65 years of age or older. The median age was 37 years. For every 100 females there were 78.2 males. For every 100 females age 18 and over, there were 71.4 males.

The median income for a household in the town was $25,241, and the median income for a family was $34,132. Males had a median income of $27,192 versus $18,281 for females. The per capita income for the town was $13,264. About 20.3% of families and 25.1% of the population were below the poverty line, including 34.1% of those under age 18 and 20.1% of those age 65 or over.

== Culture ==
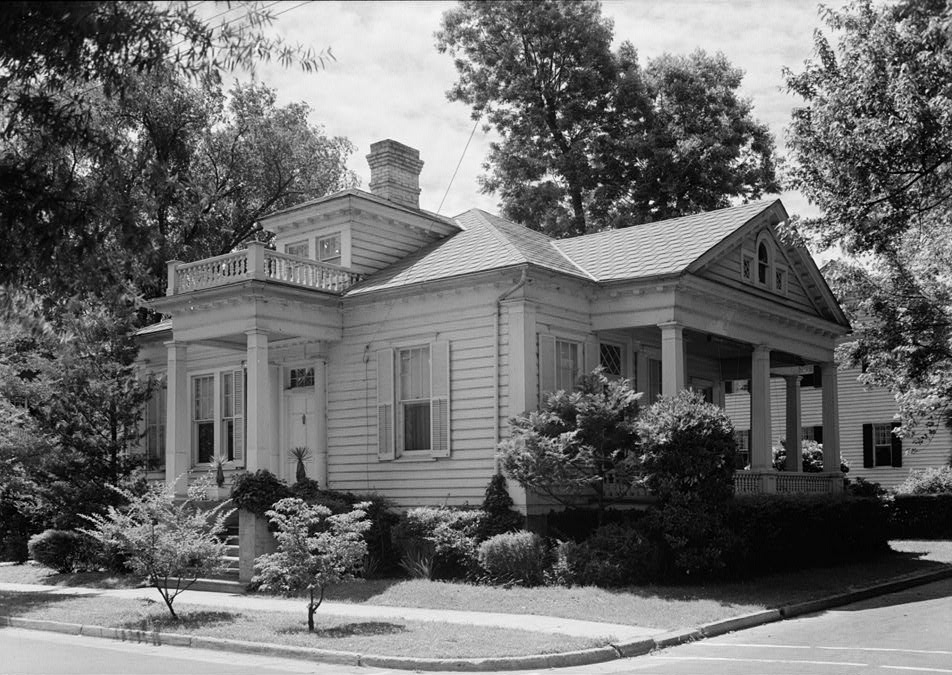
Old Customs House, Edenton

Located in northeastern North Carolina, Edenton is a small unique town known for its authentic 18th-, 19th- and early 20th-century architecture and the stories about the people behind these public buildings and homes. The Lane House dates from 1719 and may be the oldest house in the state of North Carolina. Edenton played a key role in the development of the colonies, the state and the nation. The Cupola House, a registered National Historic Landmark, was built by Francis Corbin in 1758 on the waterfront at Edenton where it stands today. The 1767 Chowan County Courthouse, another National Historic Landmark, has been used since its construction. The Barker House, home of Penelope Barker, the organizer of the first political action by women in the colonies, is operated as a house museum and to interpret colonial history. The home of James Iredell Sr. is in Edenton and operated as a North Carolina Historic Site.

=== Churches ===
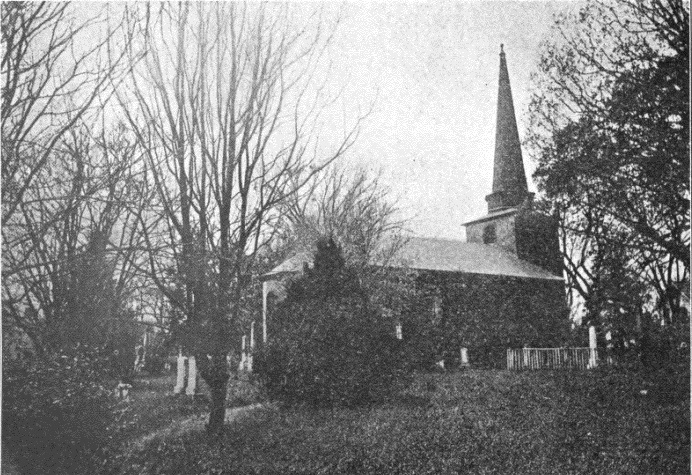
St. Paul's Church

Edenton has many religious institutions. Some of the churches in the community include:

- St. Ann Catholic Church c. 1821
- First Presbyterian Church of Edenton c. 1946
- Edenton United Methodist Church
- Open Door Church
- St. Paul's Episcopal Church, built c. 1736
- Edenton Baptist Church
- Macedonia Baptist Church: started as a particular Baptist church (Calvinistic Baptist) over 175 years ago.
- Kadesh African Methodist Episcopal Zion Church

=== Sports ===
For two years, 1951 and 1952, Edenton's Historic Hicks Field was home to a professional minor league baseball team. The Edenton Colonials played in the Class D Virginia League in 1951 and the Class D Coastal Plain League in 1952. Since 1998 Hicks Field has served as the home park for the Edenton Steamers of the collegiate summer Coastal Plain League.

== Notable people ==
- William Allen (1803–1879), born in Edenton, later governor of Ohio
- Penelope Barker (1728–1796), organized first political action by women in the Thirteen Colonies
- Robert Brown (born 1960), former NFL defensive end for the Green Bay Packers
- Wes Chesson (born 1949), former NFL wide receiver for the Atlanta Falcons and Philadelphia Eagles
- Golden Frinks (1920–2004), civil rights leader and SCLC field representative who based his activism around Edenton
- Jesse González (born 1995), MLS goalkeeper for the FC Dallas
- Joseph Hewes (1730–1779), a signer of the Declaration of Independence, first Secretary of the U.S. Navy
- James Iredell (1751–1799), Associate Justice of the U.S. Supreme Court
- Harriet Jacobs (1813–1897), abolitionist and author of Incidents in the Life of a Slave Girl, published in 1861 under the pen name of "Linda Brent"
- John Swanson Jacobs (1815–1873), Harriet's brother, abolitionist speaker and author of a slave narrative
- Josephine Leary (1856–1923), real estate entrepreneur born into slavery
- Samuel Johnston (1733–1816), revolutionary leader and first U.S. senator from North Carolina
- Zack Valentine (born 1957), Super Bowl-winning Pittsburgh Steelers linebacker; also played for the Philadelphia Eagles
- Hugh Williamson (1735–1819), Signer of the United States Constitution and member of the Constitutional Congress
- Big Daddy Wilson (born 1960), electric and soul blues singer and songwriter
- Adrian H. Wood, educator and writer
