= SS Penelope Barker =

World War II Liberty ship of the United States

History

United States
- Name: Penelope Barker
- Namesake: Penelope Barker
- Builder: North Carolina Shipbuilding Company, Wilmington, North Carolina
- Yard number: 46
- Way number: 1
- Laid down: 28 October 1942
- Launched: 1 December 1942
- Fate: Sunk January 1944

General characteristics
- Type: Liberty ship
- Tonnage: 7,000 long tons deadweight (DWT)
- Length: 441 ft 6 in (134.57 m)
- Beam: 56 ft 11 in (17.35 m)
- Draft: 27 ft 9 in (8.46 m)
- Propulsion: Two oil-fired boilers; Triple expansion steam engine; Single screw; 2,500 hp (1,864 kW)
- Speed: 11 knots (20 km/h; 13 mph)
- Capacity: 9,140 tons cargo
- Complement: 41
- Armament: 1 × Stern-mounted 4 in (100 mm) deck gun; AA guns

SS Penelope Barker (MC contract 868) was a Liberty ship built in the United States during World War II. She was named after Penelope Barker, American Revolution activist and organizer of the Edenton Tea Party boycott in 1774.

The ship was laid down by North Carolina Shipbuilding Company in their Cape Fear River yard on October 28, 1942, then launched on December 1, 1942. Penelope Baker was operated by the North Atlantic & Gulf Steamship Company for the War Shipping Administration when she was struck by two torpedoes and sunk in the Barents Sea. Five men were killed and five men missing, the rest making it safely to a Russian port.
