= Hayes Plantation =

Historic house in North Carolina, United States

- Hayes Farm
- U.S. National Register of Historic Places
- U.S. National Historic Landmark
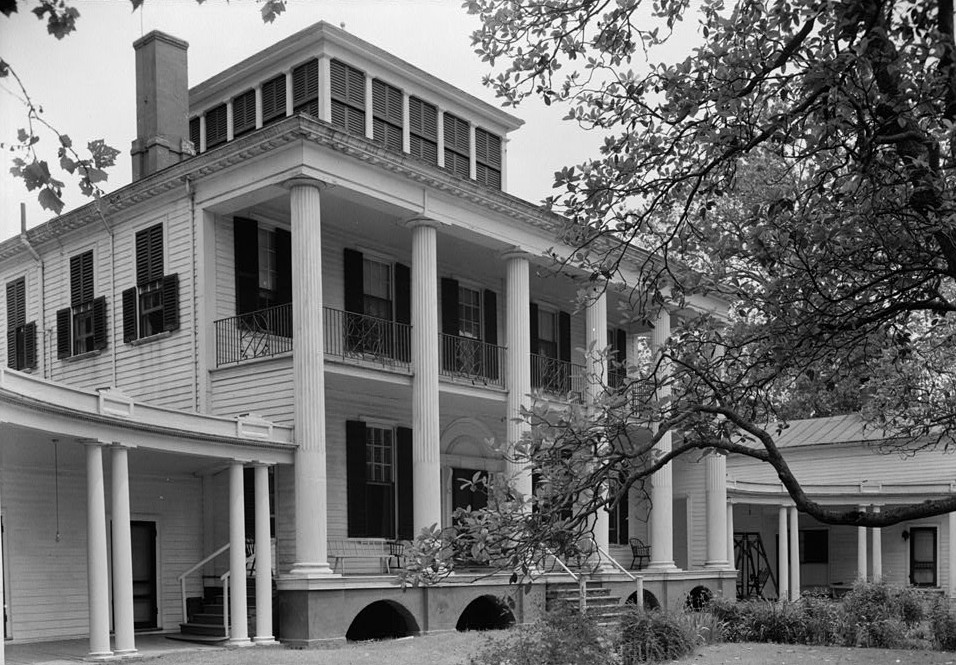
- Hayes Farm House, 1940 HABS photo

- Location within North Carolina Location within the United States
- Nearest city: Edenton, North Carolina
- Coordinates: 36°2′59.97″N 76°36′8.02″W
- Area: 600 acres (240 ha)
- Built: 1814–1817
- Architect: William Nichols, Sr.
- Architectural style: Greek Revival, Federal
- NRHP reference No.: 74001341

Significant dates
- Added to NRHP: February 26, 1974
- Designated NHL: November 7, 1973

Hayes Farm, also known as Hayes Plantation, is a historic plantation near Edenton, North Carolina that belonged to Samuel Johnston (1733–1816), who served as Governor of North Carolina from 1787 to 1789. Johnston became one of the state's first two United States Senators, serving from 1789 until 1793, and served later as a judge until retiring in 1803. Samuel Johnston died in 1816 at "the Hermitage," his home near Williamston in Martin County, N.C. The residence known as Hayes was completed by his son, James Cathcart Johnston, a year after Samuel's death. There are numerous other structures on the property, some predating the Hayes house itself, including the Hayes Gatehouse, which James Johnston lived in prior to the construction of the Hayes house.

== History ==
James Cathcart Johnston was known as a bachelor. Recent research published in 2013 reveals that although Johnston never married, he was the father of four daughters by his manumitted mistress, Edith "Edy" Wood, of nearby Hertford, N.C. Two of his girls died at the age of eight and nine in 1836, and his eldest daughter, Mary Virginia Wood Forten (daughter-in-law of wealthy African American abolitionist, James Forten), died in Philadelphia of tuberculosis in 1840, leaving behind her three-year-old daughter, the future diarist, poet, and equal rights activist Charlotte Forten Grimke. Johnston's youngest daughter, Annie Wood (1831–1879), was just six years older than her niece Charlotte, and the two girls were raised by Edy Wood until Edy's death in 1846. The girls continued to be raised with the Forten-Purvis clan while Annie Wood was adopted by Amy Matilda Cassey, daughter of African American Episcopal priest, Peter Williams, Jr. and wife of wealthy African American financier and benefactor, Joseph Cassey. In 1850, after Joseph Cassey's death, Amy Matilda Cassey married antislavery orator, Charles Lenox Remond, and moved from Philadelphia to his home in Salem, Massachusetts, taking Annie Wood with her. While in Salem, Annie Wood married her childhood sweetheart, John G. Webb, grandson of Vice President Aaron Burr and brother of Frank J. Webb, author of the second African American novel, The Garies and Their Friends. James Cathcart Johnston paid for Annie Wood's education, made generous payments to her as she grew up, and promised her an "independence."

James C. Johnston died at the end of the Civil War and left Hayes to his "friend and advisor" Edward Wood of Greenfield Plantation. Edward Wood had several children with his wife Caroline Gilliam- Wood. However, Wood also fathered a daughter with a slave. His biracial daughter, Mariah was raised in the Wood home and was reared by her aunt Sarah Wood-Walker (house servant). Mr. Wood and his family moved to Hayes and members of the Wood family lived until the State of North Carolina purchased Hayes in a sale that was finalized 30 December 2022. It is a working farm with numerous crops, including cotton, tobacco, peanuts and various grains. The modern day Wood family has hosted many functions and gatherings at the home including the North Carolina Supreme Court, the North Carolina House of Representatives, Governors Terry Sanford, James B. Hunt Jr., Pat McCrory and numerous other dignitaries.

The house and much of its contents and its multitude of outbuildings will be preserved. The grounds will be open to the public as a large park immediately adjoining the town of Edenton.

The main house, considered by architectural scholars to be "one of the South's most accomplished examples of a five-part palladian villa," was designed by English-born architect, William Nichols, Sr., famous for his early Neoclassical-style buildings in the American South and for designing statehouses for three Southern states. Construction of the house began in 1814, but was not completed until 1817. The central block of the house is connected to its dependencies by curved hyphens. A broad belvedere crowns the roof of the central block. The plantation house is privately owned, but was designated a National Historic Landmark on November 7, 1973, and added to the National Register of Historic Places on February 26, 1974.

Hayes is located east of Edenton, overlooking Edenton Bay to the south and Queen Annes Creek to the north.

Just outside the home is a small graveyard called Johnston's cemetery. Many notable figures were buried here, including Penelope Barker, leader of the Edenton Tea Party; James Iredell, an associate justice to the U.S. Supreme Court; Samuel Johnston, Governor of North Carolina; James Iredell, Jr., Governor of North Carolina; and James Wilson, a signer of the Declaration of Independence and one of the chief authors of the U.S. Constitution. Wilson's remains were moved in 1906 to Christ Church Philadelphia by the state of Pennsylvania.

In 2007, John G. Zehmer published a book on the plantation called Hayes: The Plantation, Its People, and Their Papers. The book consists of many historic documents, photos, and memories from various members of the Wood family and those who know it best.

== See also ==
- List of National Historic Landmarks in North Carolina
- National Register of Historic Places listings in Chowan County, North Carolina
- List of burial places of justices of the Supreme Court of the United States
