= Founding Mothers =

Founding Mothers may refer to:

- Matrilineality in Judaism
- Women in the American Revolution
  - Founding Mothers, book on this topic by journalist Cokie Roberts.
