= Ann Bates =

American spy

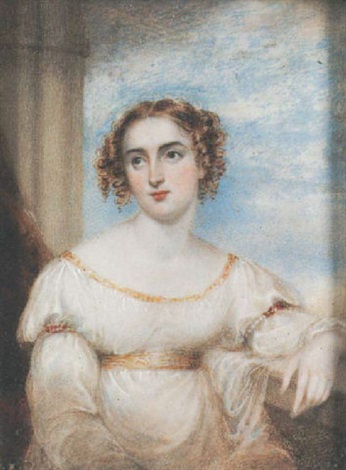
- Born: Pennsylvania
- Died: London, England
- Other name: Mrs. Barnes
- Occupation: Spy
- Years active: 1778–1780
- Known for: Loyalist spy in the American Revolution
- Spouse: Joseph Bates

Ann Bates (1748 – 1801) was an American Loyalist spy during the American Revolution. She was born in Philadelphia, Pennsylvania where she became a schoolteacher. She went on to become a part of British General Henry Clinton's espionage network and helped them combat American forces on several fronts. Known as "Mrs. Bates" to affiliates in spy networks, she reportedly took part in various clandestine spy missions between 1778 and 1780. Bates was known for her missions completed at George Washington's base camp in White Plains, New York, and during the Rhode Island campaign or the Battle of Rhode Island.

== Early life ==
Bates was born in Philadelphia where she became a schoolteacher. She operated a small store to support herself, and also kept bees and sheep. Bates married Joseph Bates, an artillery engineer who joined Clinton's retreating forces in 1778.

== Career ==
Due to prevailing beliefs of the era that women were not knowledgeable about wartime strategy and armaments, she was able to move unnoticed within American camps. Disguised as a peddler, she traveled freely amongst the soldiers.

=== Entering the spy ring ===
Bates was recruited into espionage by civilian-spy, John Craig, or "Craiggie". They first crossed paths during the British occupation of Philadelphia. Craig, an active member of Clinton's espionage network, entrusted Bates with minor covert assignments while they were both in Philadelphia. Recognizing her intelligence, Craig recommended a meeting between Bates and his superior, Major Duncan Drummond, in New York City. On June 18, 1778, Bates departed Philadelphia as Clinton evacuated his troops from the city. Clinton appointed Major John Andre to oversee intelligence operations, and under his leadership Bates became part of the spy ring.

The decision to include Bates in Andre's network was prompted by reports of an alliance forming between France and the United States. With the shifting political landscape, Bates, like many loyalists, departed Philadelphia alongside the British Army. She convinced then General Benedict Arnold that she was leaving to conduct business in New York City, following her husband who had joined Clinton's forces on the same day.

Upon reaching New York City, Bates encountered a surprise when she met Duncan Drummond, a key figure in Clinton's spy operations, instead of Craig. They persuaded Bates to join the British spy network. Drummond wrote of their meeting, "A woman whom Craig has trusted often came to town last night. She is well acquainted with many of the R.A. (Royal Army)... It is proposed to send her out under the idea of selling little matters."

=== Washington's camp and the Rhode Island Campaign ===
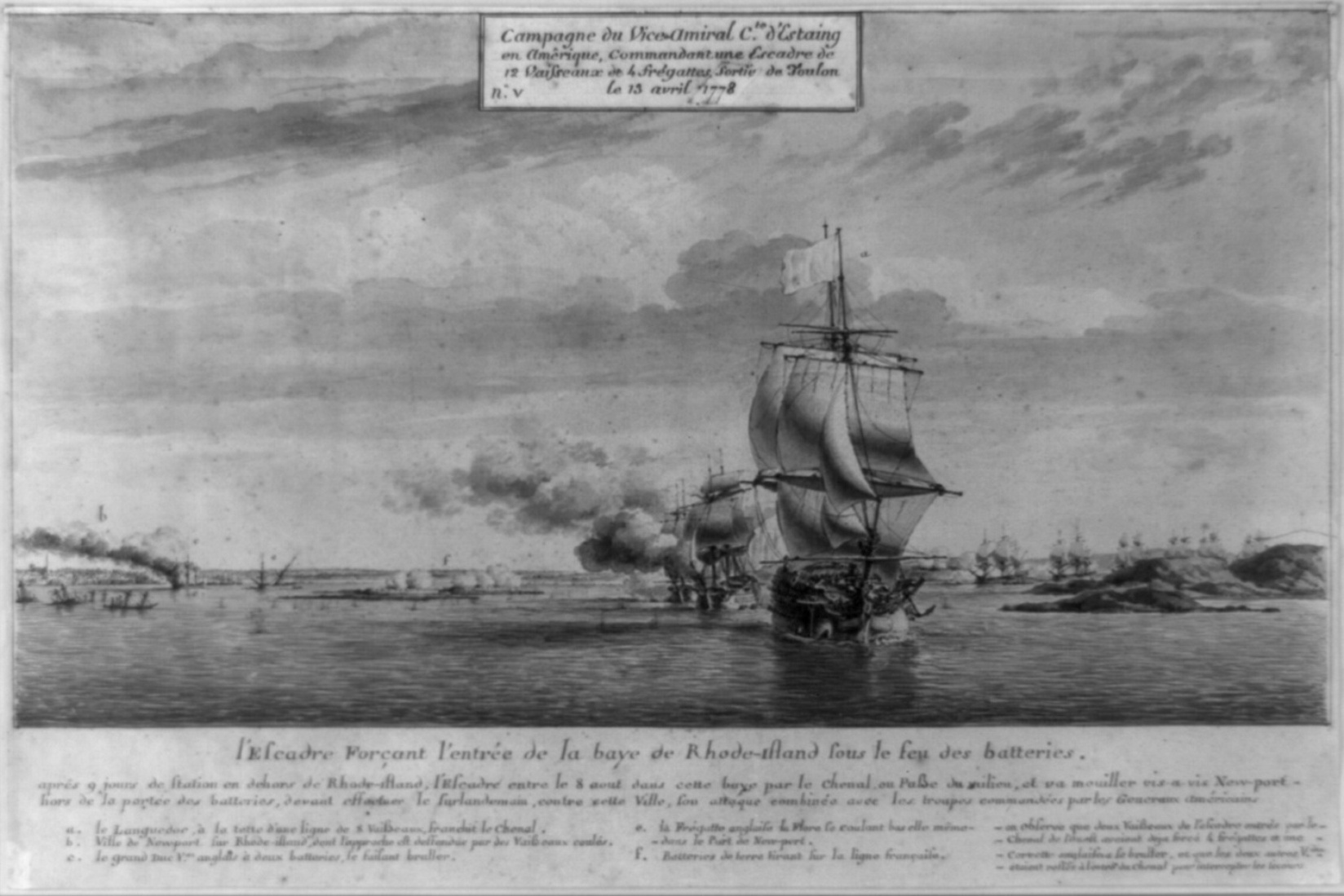
Entry of the French squadron in Newport Bay, Aug. 8, 1778 (drawing by Pierre Ozanne, 1778)

On June 29, 1778, Bates left New York City for her first mission after only one day of training. She traveled to Washington's camp in White Plains, New York under the name "Mrs. Barnes." Because she was familiar with the artillery, she was able to relay valuable information about the Americans' materials and strategy. The mission was to identify a disloyal soldier in Washington's camp who could provide the British with intelligence, but Bates was unable to find someone willing. She instead listened in on many conversations and counted artillery pieces on the camp. At George Washington's camp in White Plains, American troops were planning the Rhode Island Campaign. She recorded intelligence on American movement into Rhode Island.

On her way back to New York City, she was stopped at an American patrol stop four miles from White Plains for unknown reasons and arrested at the checkpoint due to suspicion. Bates was detained overnight but released the next morning. When she returned to New York City, she reported that Americans had fewer weapons than the British had estimated. Drummond was impressed with her work, memory, and capabilities. Despite the brief imprisonment, Bates was eager to return to White Plains. She completed three trips to the camp and relayed information necessary for the British troops to combat American military efforts in the Battle of Rhode Island. In her third mission, she observed 600 boats were being prepared to attack Long Island and gave specific intelligence about the number of troops that were heading to attack British forces stationed there.

On a mission infiltrating Washington's army in September 1778, a deserter from the 27th Regiment recognized her, but she was able to elude capture. She traveled through a series of safe houses that were designed for women spies at the time. She later wrote, "I had the opportunity of going through their whole army remarking at the same time the strength and situation of each brigade, and the number of cannon with their situation and weight of ball each cannon was charged with."

=== New Jersey and capture ===
During her final mission in White Plains, Ann Bates came across a former British soldier, a defector, who she suspected would report her. She fled directly back to New York and while traveling through New Jersey, she stayed in Tory safe houses throughout the state. The network of Loyalist safe houses throughout the mid-Atlantic proved to be effective, as many British prisoners were able to escape American camps from Virginia up through the East Coast.

On Saturday, September 26, 1778, on her way back to New York City, Bates was discovered at an American headquarters. The American unit had over 5,000 troops and was under the command of General Charles Scott, Washington's Chief of Intelligence, who was on the lookout for British counter-intelligence. Bates was detained and taken to Scott, who questioned her. Bates told Scott that she "was a Soldier's wife in the Centre Division and had forgot something about five or six miles below the Plains." Bates was released, but she was rattled by suspicion she had garnered. After returning to New York City and delivering information to Drummond, he took her to Long Island with the hopes of avoiding any further encounters with American forces. A few days later, they returned to Manhattan, and Drummond asked her to meet with a friend of Benedict Arnold's within a 47-mile radius of Philadelphia.

=== British advancement to Charleston ===
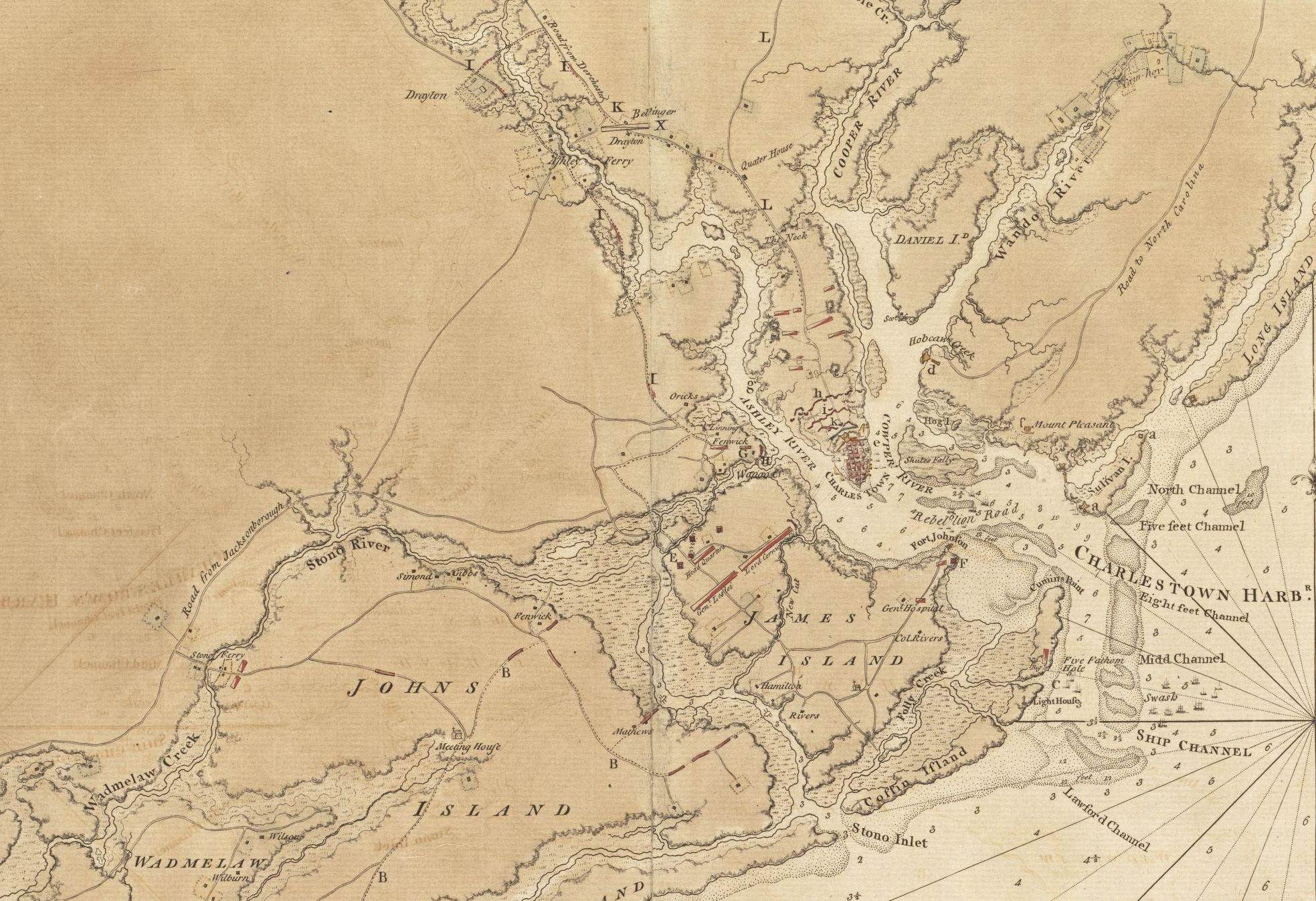
Detail of a 1780 map drawn by a British engineer showing the Charleston defenses

Between October 1778 and August 1779, Bates did not have any participation in Clinton's spy espionage network. This was due to Clinton sending Drummond back to England due to a disagreement between the two. André went on to take Drummond's place. André was known for his collaboration with American spy Benedict Arnold. In April 1780, her husband, Joseph Bates, was sent to Charleston, South Carolina to lay siege to the city. Bates traveled with him there but refrained from taking part in any further spy networking. Colonel Nisbet Balfour asked for Bates' assistance in operating a spy ring out of Charleston, to aid in General Charles Cornwallis' siege, but the mission was aborted.

=== Return to England and later life ===
On March 6, 1781, Ann Bates and her husband sailed for England. Her espionage and the family's economic distress put a strain on her marriage, and Joseph left her soon after they arrived in England.

Bates took pride in her role after the war was over and wrote a petition for a pension in 1785. The petition stated, "my timely information as the blessed means of saving the Rhode Island garrison with all the troops and stores who must otherwise have fallen a prey to their enemies." She contacted Drummond to assist her in securing a pension from the British government for her services during the American Revolution, which she ultimately obtained.

Bates' date of death was not recorded, but it is suspected that she died in England.

== Legacy ==
She is remembered as an integral spy for the Loyalist army during the American Revolution.

Bates was portrayed by Tina Benko in the AMC TV series, Turn: Washington's Spies.

== See also ==
- Women in the American Revolution
- Loyalists fighting in the American Revolution
- Intelligence in the American Revolutionary War
- Intelligence operations in the American Revolutionary War
- Miss Jenny
- Agent 355
- Lydia Darragh

== Bibliography ==
- McBurney, Christian M. Spies in Revolutionary Rhode Island. Charleston, SC: History, 2014.
- McBurney, Christian M. "Ann Bates: British Spy Extraordinaire." Journal of the American Revolution. December 1, 2014. https://allthingsliberty.com/2014/12/ann-bates-british-spy-extraordinaire/
- Misencik, Paul R. The Original American Spies-Seven Covert Agents Of The Revolutionary War. North Carolina: McFarland Publishing, 2013.
- MacLean, Maggie. "Ann Bates." History of American Women. July 4, 2011. http://www.womenhistoryblog.com/2011/07/ann-bates.html
- "Women Spies - Ann Bates." Women Spies - Ann Bates. University of Michigan: Clements Library, n.d. Web. 29 Nov. 2016.
