= Penelope Barker =

American political activist (1728–1796)

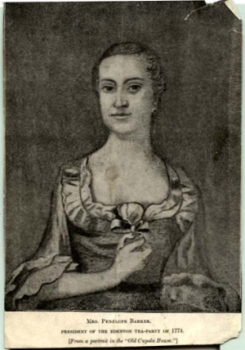
- Barker, c. 1776
- Born: Penelope Pagett; June 17th, 1728; Edenton, North Carolina, British America
- Died: 1796 (aged 67–68); Edenton, North Carolina, U.S.
- Occupation: Activist during the American Revolution
- Spouses: John Hodgson (m. 1745; died 1747) James Craven (m. 1751; died 1755) Thomas Barker (m. 1757; died 1790)

Penelope Padgett Hodgson Craven Barker, commonly known as Penelope Barker (June 17, 1728 – 1796), was a Colonial American activist who, in the lead-up to the American Revolution, organized a boycott of British goods in 1774 orchestrated by a group of women known as the Edenton Tea Party. It was the "first recorded women's political demonstration in America".

By the time she was seventeen years of age, Barker helped raise her sister's three children and married her sister's husband, attorney John Hodgson, which began her life as a mother and planter. She married two more times to wealthy men, continuing to run plantations after their deaths. She gave birth to five children and was the stepmother to four children, all but two of whom had died by 1761. Stepson Thomas Hodgson died in 1772. Her only remaining child then was Betsy Barker, who lived to adulthood and married William Tunstall, a successful planter.

Dillard described her as "one of those lofty, intrepid, high-born women peculiarly fitted by nature to lead; fear formed no part of her composition. Her face bears the expression of sternness without harshness, which a cheap novelist would describe as hauteur. She was a brilliant conversationalist, and a society leader of her day."

== Early life and family ==
Penelope Padgett was born June 17, 1728, at Blenheim Manor in Edenton in the Colony of North Carolina, (Note: Her maiden name is also spelled Pagett.) one of three daughters to Samuel Padgett, a physician, and Elizabeth Blount. Her sisters were Sarah and Elizabeth. Padgett was the granddaughter of Anne Willis and James Blount, a prominent planter of Chowan County. The Padgetts lived on a 2,000-acre plantation. As she grew up, Penelope lived a comfortable life of teas, church suppers, parties, and balls.

By 1745, when she was a teen, her father and married sister, Elizabeth Hodgson, died consecutively, leaving her to raise Elizabeth's children, (Note: Waldrup states that she was 19 when her father died, which would have been 1747.) Isabella, John, and Robert. Her brother-in-law and later husband, John Hodgson, managed her father's estate.

== Personal life and planter ==
External images
- Portrait of Penelope Barker, in color
- Thomas Hodson, Barker's son

Barker married her deceased sister's husband, John Hodgson, in 1745 at about the age of 17. (Note: She has been said to have married at the age of 16, 17, and 19. If she was 19 when married, her marriage to John Hodgson would have occurred in 1747 (or she would have been born in 1726).) Their first son was Samuel. Only two years after their marriage, John died, when she was pregnant with their second son Thomas. She also had her sister and husband's three children to raise. She ran the Hodgson plantations, with 25 enslaved people. When she was 21 years of age, the Court doubted that she was old enough to raise and educate five children. They threatened to remove her children. In October 1751, she was returned to the guardian of her three stepchildren.

In 1752, Barker married wealthy bachelor James Craven, who was a planter and politician. From Doughton, Yorkshire, England, he immigrated to Colonial North Carolina by 1734. They did not have any children of their own. (Note: In 1752, Penelope Hodgson transferred ownership of the property to James Craven, before their marriage, as stated in James Craven's will. He left the property, along with the rest of his estate to her upon his death.) Barker brought income into the family by renting out some of their enslaved people and selling sugar, nutmeg, cinnamon, and packs of cards. She purchased luxury items like rum, salt, sugar, molasses, and chocolate. When James died in 1755, (Note: James Craven wrote his will on September 28, 1755, and died before the end of the year. The estate began to be probated in 1755, so the inferred death year is 1755. Mitchell says he died in 1755 and then eleven pages later says he died in 1756.) she and the children inherited his estate and she became the richest woman in the Province of North Carolina.

For the third and final time, she married Thomas Barker, an attorney and a member of the House of Burgesses in Edenton in 1757, who was 16 years older than her, becoming Penelope Barker. He was previously married and brought a daughter named Betsy into the marriage. They had three children—Penelope, Thomas, and Nathaniel—all of whom died very young, from a few to ten months of age.

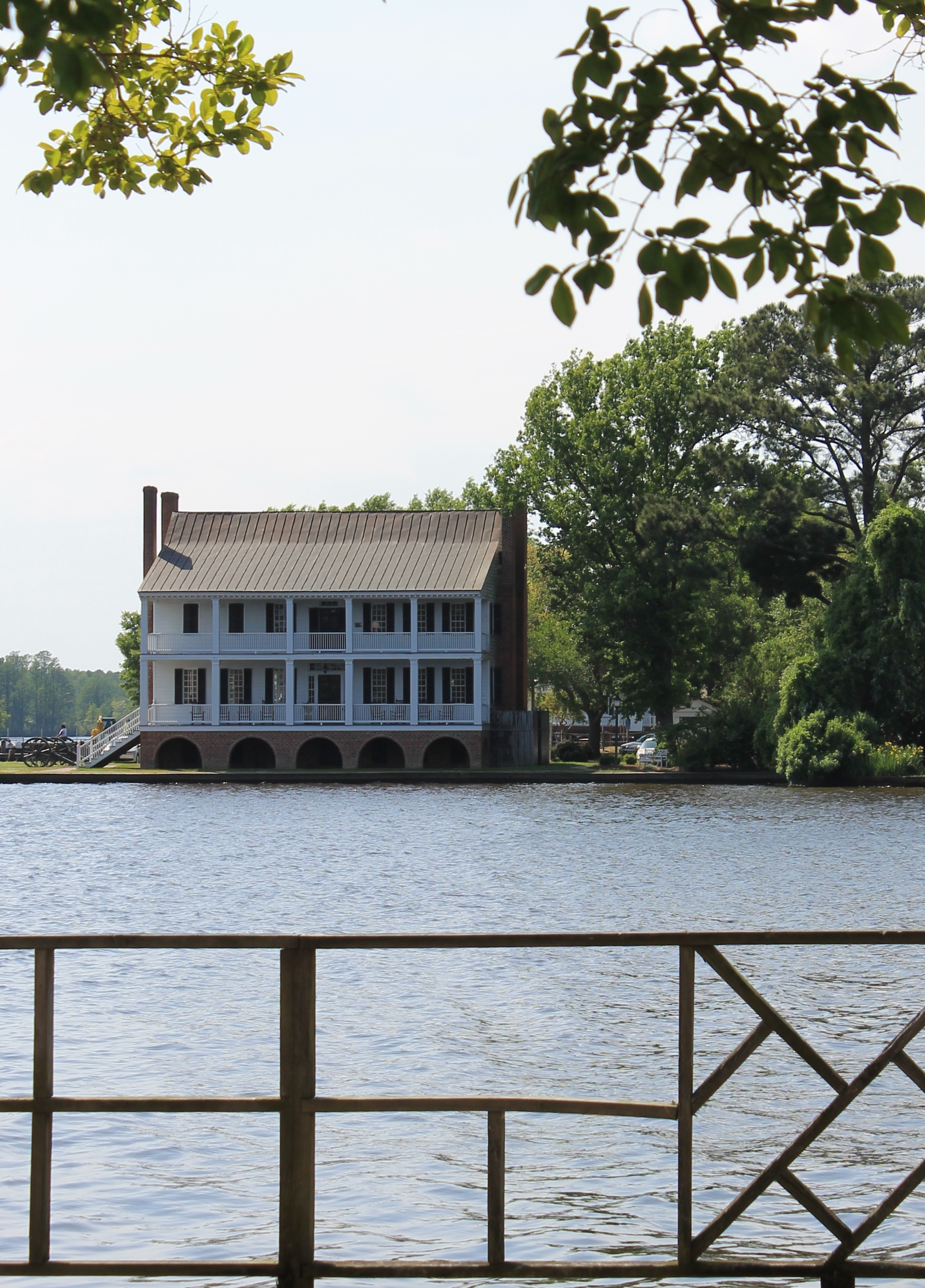
Barker House, Edenton, North Carolina, built by Penelope and Thomas Barker in 1782, listed on the National Register of Historic Places

Thomas, a representative of the North Carolina's assembly to the board of trade, sailed to Europe in 1761 and was delayed in returning due to the British blockade of American ships during the American Revolutionary War. (Note: The NCPedia states that Thomas was away from 1761 to 1778, but Waldrup states that he was made treasurer of the North Carolina Colony and assembly clerk in October 1774 and set sail a few weeks after the Edenton Tea Party.) While her husband was unable to return home from London, Barker managed their estates and home, which included two children. By that time, she had lost four of her own children and three children from her husbands' previous marriages. Her son Thomas Hodgson died at the age of 25 in 1772. Her stepson John Hodgson died in 1774. Betsy Barker married a successful planter William Tunstall from Pittsylvania County in the Colony of Virginia.

During the Revolutionary War, Barker protected her residence from the British,

Being informed by a servant that some British soldiers were taking her carriage horses from her stables, she snatched her husband's sword from the wall, went out, and with a single blow severed the reins in the officer's hands, and drove her horses back into the stables. The British officer declared, that for such an exhibition of bravery, she should be allowed to keep her horses, and she was never afterward molested.

Thomas returned in September 1778. In 1782, Thomas and his wife built a home, known today as the Barker House. Thomas died on December 10, 1790, (Note: Years of death are also 1787, 1788, and 1789 but his gravestone states that he died December 10, 1790.) Barker inherited her husband's estate of 25 enslaved people, their luxury furnishings, and the plantation. Barker died in 1796. She and her husband are buried alongside each other in the small graveyard called Johnston's cemetery at Hayes Plantation, near Edenton.

== Edenton Tea Party ==
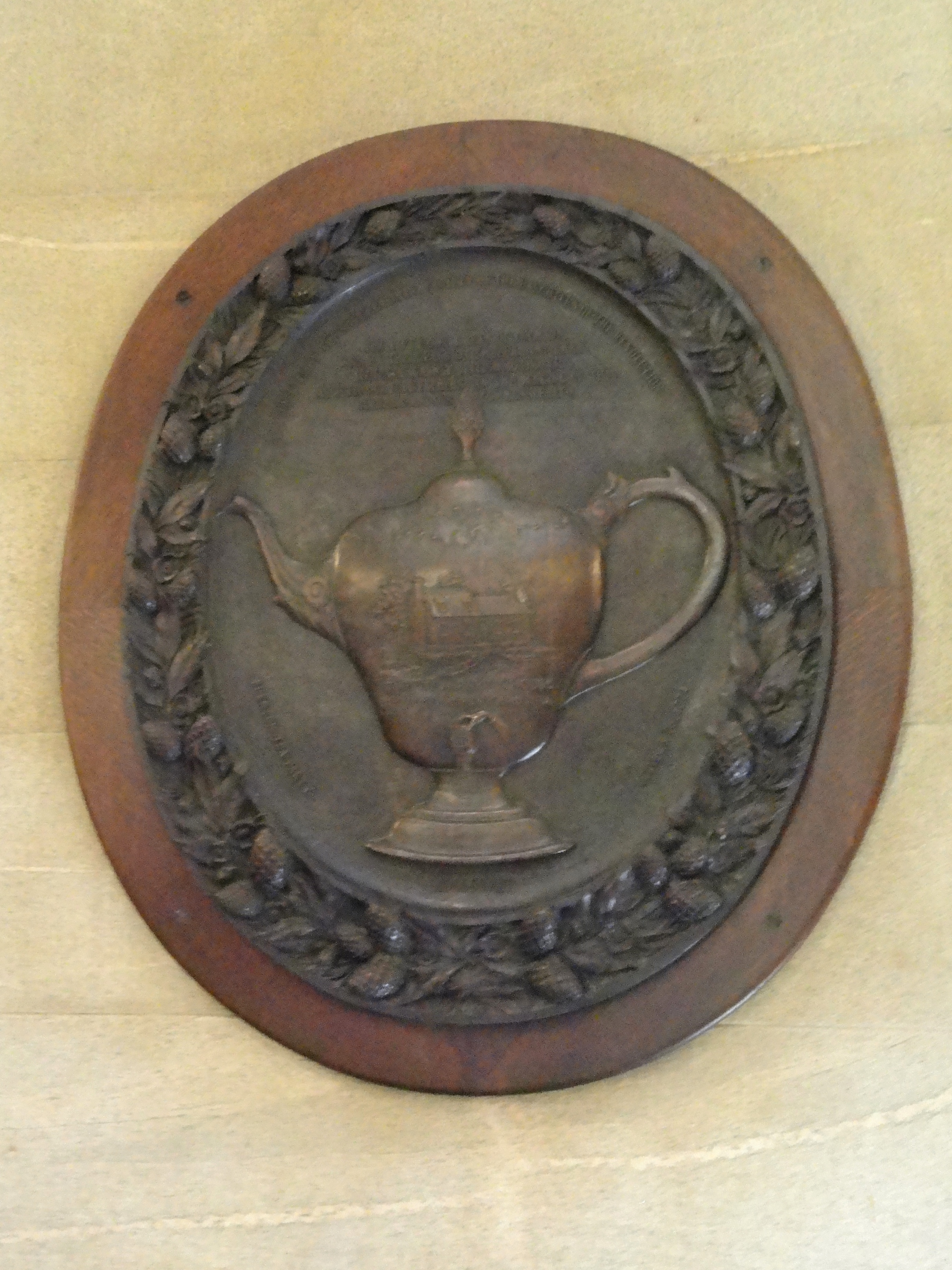
Plaque commemorating the Edenton Tea Party, October 25, 1774. Located inside the North Carolina State Capitol, Raleigh, North Carolina.

Barker was known as a patriot of the Revolution and ten months after the famous Boston Tea Party, she organized a Tea Party of her own. Barker wrote a statement proposing a boycott of British goods, like cloth and tea. Followed by 50 other women, the Edenton Tea Party was created. On October 25, 1774, Barker and her supporters, Edenton Ladies Patriotic Guild, met at the house of Elizabeth King to sign the Edenton Tea Party resolution that protested the British Tea Act of 1773. (Note: Mitchell states that although it is widely stated that the meeting took place at the home of Elizabeth King, there is little actual evidence that this occurred. In addition, her house may have been too small for such a gathering.) It was the "first recorded women's political demonstration in [Colonial] America". Barker continued to protest throughout the Revolutionary War.

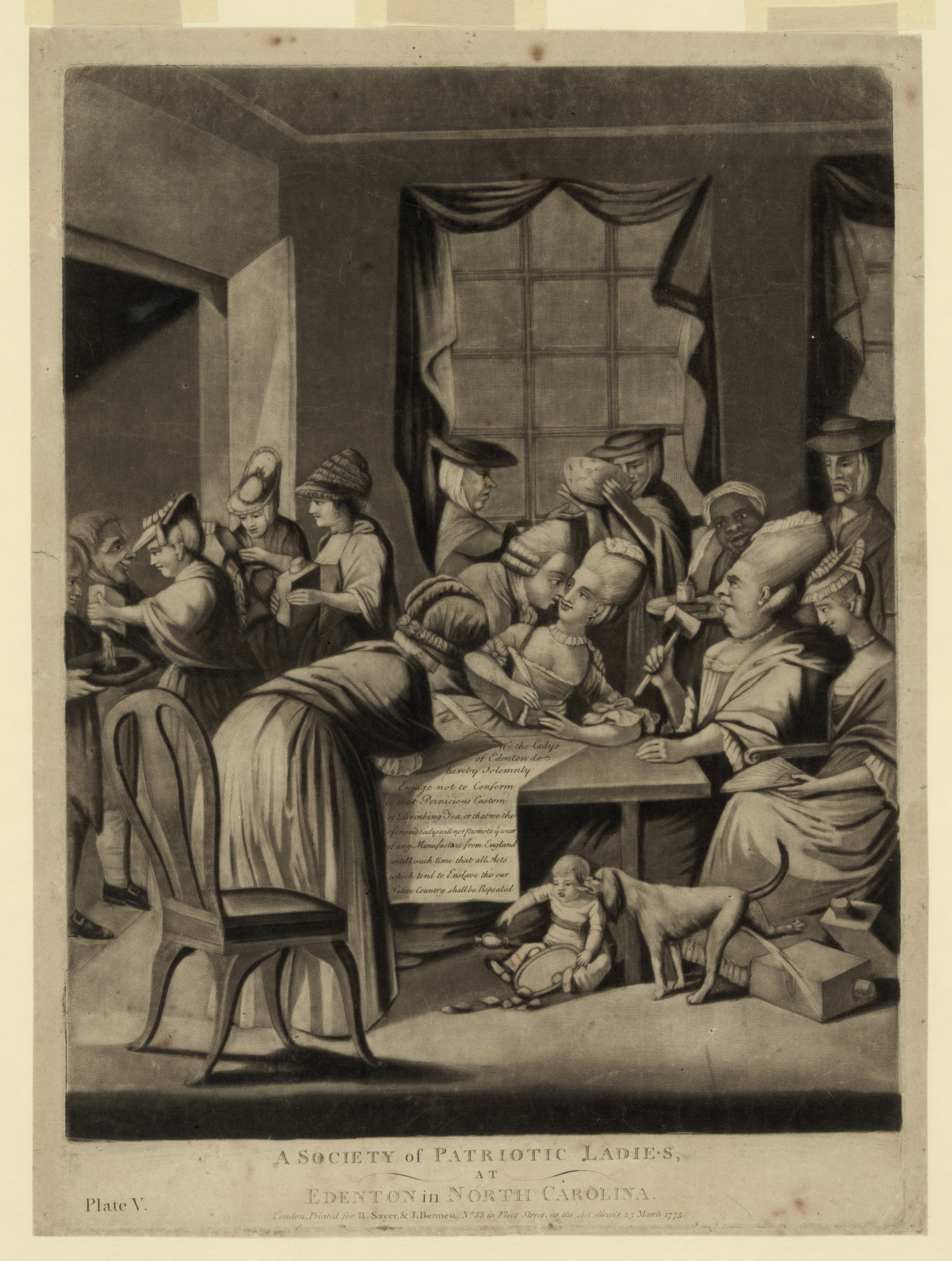
The political cartoon of the Edenton Tea Party was published in the London press.

The petition was published in colonial newspapers and in London. Barker also sent a "fiery letter" to London. The women were mocked in the London papers. A political cartoon entitled "Edenton Tea Party" was published and released in London on January 16, 1775. The cartoon portrayed the women as bad mothers with loose morals and received misogynistic ridicule.

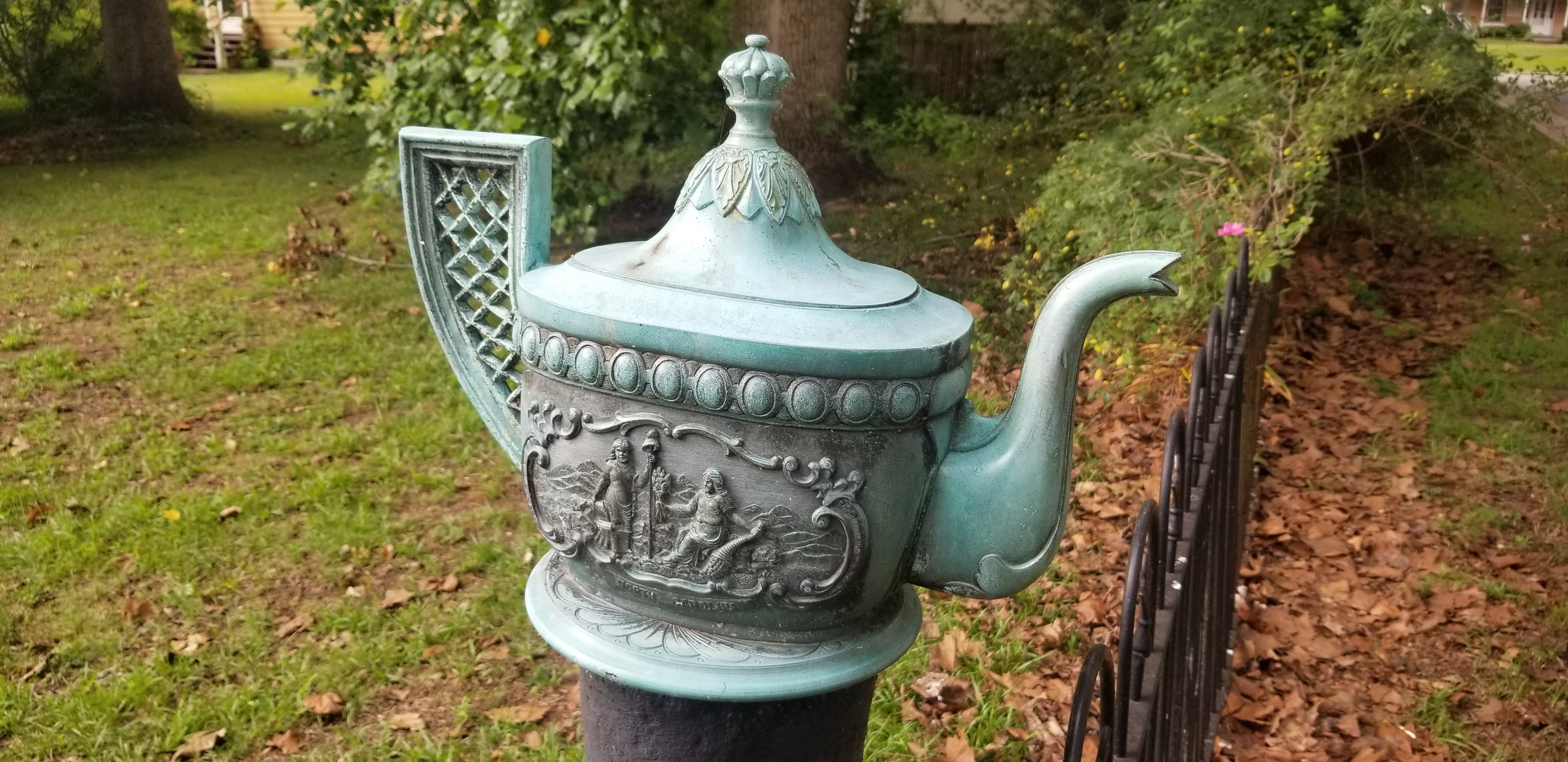
Edenton Tea Pot. Sculpted in 1905, this teapot commemorates the 1774 Edenton Tea Party.

The women were praised as patriots by the Colonial American press. Other women followed suit by swearing off tea. Southern women danced in ballgowns made from homespun fabric (that started with the homespun movement). Northern women had spinning bees for the production of homemade material. A ship-load of imported East India Company tea was locked away in a port in Charles Town (now Charleston, South Carolina) for months because it could not be sold with the tax. At the start of the Revolution, a group of patriots gathered the tea and sold it to other patriots to fund the rebellion against the British. They had also ousted royal officials and agents at the time. The Daughters of Liberty, like the Sons of Liberty, boycotted British goods.

In 1908, a plaque was dedicated by the Daughters of the American Revolution of North Carolina and placed in the state Capitol Building in Raleigh, North Carolina. It honored her leadership at the Edenton Tea Party. In 1940, a marker was placed at West Queen Street (US 17 Business) in Edenton by the North Carolina Highway Historical Marker Program. It states, "Women in this town led by Penelope Barker in 1774 resolved to boycott British imports. Early and influential activism by women."

== See also ==
- Women in the American Revolution

== Sources ==
- Collins, Gail (2003). "What have I to do with politicks". America's Women: Four Hundred Years of Dolls, Drudges, Helpmates, and Heroines. New York : William Morrow. ISBN 978-0-06-018510-7.
- Garrison, Webb (1993). "First Women's Movement Urged Cider, Buttermilk, and Water". Great stories of the american revolution. Rutledge Hill Press. ISBN 978-1-55853-270-0.
- Mitchell, Maggie. Treasonous Tea: The Edenton Tea Party of 1774 (Masters). Liberty University. that was a Master's dissertation, and published Mitchell, Maggie (2015). Treasonous Tea: The Edenton Tea Party of 1774. Liberty University.
- Silcox-Jarrett, Diane (2000). "Penelope Barker, Leader of the Edenton Tea Party'". Heroines of the American Revolution: America's founding mothers. New York : Scholastic Inc. ISBN 978-0-439-25947-7.
- Waldrup, Carole Chandler (2004). More Colonial women: 25 pioneers of early America. Jefferson, N.C. : McFarland & Co. ISBN 978-0-7864-1839-8.
