= SS Isaac Mayer Wise =

Liberty ship of WWII

History

United States
- Name: Isaac Mayer Wise
- Namesake: Isaac Mayer Wise
- Owner: War Shipping Administration (WSA)
- Operator: North Atlantic & Gulf Steamship Co.
- Ordered: as type (EC2-S-C1) hull, MC hull 2509
- Awarded: 23 April 1943
- Builder: St. Johns River Shipbuilding Company, Jacksonville, Florida
- Cost: $964,961
- Yard number: 73
- Way number: 1
- Laid down: 3 November 1944
- Launched: 6 December 1944
- Completed: 15 December 1944
- Identification: Call sign: ANBT
- Fate: Laid up in the James River Reserve Fleet, Lee Hall, Virginia, 26 December 1947; Laid up in the National Defense Reserve Fleet, Mobile, Alabama, 14 May 1952; Sold for scrapping, 1 May 1972, withdrawn from fleet, 28 August 1972

General characteristics
- Class & type: Liberty ship; type EC2-S-C1, standard
- Tonnage: 10,865 LT DWT; 7,176 GRT
- Displacement: 3,380 long tons (3,434 t) (light); 14,245 long tons (14,474 t) (max)
- Length: 441 feet 6 inches (135 m) oa; 416 feet (127 m) pp; 427 feet (130 m) lwl
- Beam: 57 feet (17 m)
- Draft: 27 ft 9.25 in (8.4646 m)
- Installed power: 2 × Oil fired 450 °F (232 °C) boilers, operating at 220 psi (1,500 kPa); 2,500 hp (1,900 kW)
- Propulsion: 1 × triple-expansion steam engine, (manufactured by General Machinery Corp., Hamilton, Ohio); 1 × screw propeller
- Speed: 11.5 knots (21.3 km/h; 13.2 mph)
- Capacity: 562,608 cubic feet (15,931 m^{3}) (grain); 499,573 cubic feet (14,146 m^{3}) (bale)
- Complement: 38–62 USMM; 21–40 USNAG
- Armament: Varied by ship; Bow-mounted 3-inch (76 mm)/50-caliber gun; Stern-mounted 4-inch (102 mm)/50-caliber gun; 2–8 × single 20-millimeter (0.79 in) Oerlikon anti-aircraft (AA) cannons and/or, 2–8 × 37-millimeter (1.46 in) M1 AA guns

SS Isaac Mayer Wise was a Liberty ship built in the United States during World War II. She was named after Isaac Mayer Wise, an American Reform rabbi, editor, and author.

== Construction ==
Isaac Mayer Wise was laid down on 3 November 1944, under a Maritime Commission (MARCOM) contract, MC hull 2509, by the St. Johns River Shipbuilding Company, Jacksonville, Florida; and was launched on 6 December 1944.

== History ==
She was allocated to the North Atlantic & Gulf Steamship Co., on 15 December 1944. On 26 December 1947, she was laid up in the James River Reserve Fleet, Lee Hall, Virginia. On 14 May 1952, she was laid up in the National Defense Reserve Fleet, Mobile, Alabama. She was sold for scrapping on 1 May 1972, to Luria Brothers & Company, for $37,100. She was removed from the fleet, 28 August 1972.

== Bibliography ==
- "St. John's River Shipbuilding, Jacksonville FL". www.ShipbuildingHistory.com. 16 October 2010.
- Maritime Administration. "Isaac Mayer Wise". Ship History Database Vessel Status Card. U.S. Department of Transportation, Maritime Administration.
- Davies, James (May 2004). "Specifications (As-Built)" (PDF). p. 23.
- "SS Isaac Mayer Wise".
