= Virginia cloth =

Coarse cloth made by natives of Virginia

Virginia cloth was a coarse cloth made by natives of Virginia. The fabric has a record of existence in 1721 and was used for servants' wear. The material was a mix of cotton and wool.

== Name ==
It was named after the state of Virginia.

== Material ==
Virginia cloth was made with homespun yarns of cotton and wool and by using handweaving by the local people for their use. American revolution pushed the progression of many homemade cloths.

== Mentions ==
Andrew Burnaby an English clergyman mentions ''Virginia cloth'' in his travelogue Travels Through the Middle Settlements in North America, In the Years 1759 and 1760.

== See also ==
- Lowell cloth
