= List of burial places of justices of the Supreme Court of the United States =

Burial places of justices of the Supreme Court of the United States are located across 26 states and the District of Columbia. The state with the most U.S. Supreme Court justice burial sites is Virginia with 20 – 14 of which are at Arlington National Cemetery. Since it was established in 1789, 114 persons have served as a justice (associate justice or chief justice) on the Supreme Court; of these, 105 have died. The first death of a justice was that of James Wilson on August 21, 1798, and the most recent was that of David Souter on May 8, 2025. William Howard Taft, who was chief justice from 1921 to 1930 after serving as president of the United States from 1909 to 1913, was the first justice for whom a state funeral has been held; Justice Ginsburg, who served as an associate justice from 1993 to 2020, was the second to receive this honor.

The sortable table below lists each deceased justice's place of burial, along with date of death, and the order of their membership on the Court. Five people served first as associate justices, and later as chief justices, separately: Charles Evans Hughes, (Note: Served on the Supreme Court on two separate occasions, first as an associate justice, and then, after a period of years off the Court, as chief justice.) William Rehnquist, (Note: Elevated from associate justice to chief justice while serving on the Supreme Court; such appointments are subject to a separate confirmation process.) John Rutledge, Harlan F. Stone, and Edward Douglass White. While having served in two positions, these individuals are listed only once in the table, and their order of justiceship (OJ) represents the overall order in which each began their initial service on the Court as an associate justice.

== Supreme Court justice burial places ==
OJ	Name	Death Date	Burial Place	City	State	Site image
1	^{CJ} John Jay	May 17, 1829	Jay Estate Cemetery	Rye	New York	
2	^{CJ} John Rutledge	July 23, 1800	St. Michael's Churchyard	Charleston	South Carolina	Gravesite of Justice John Rutledge at St. Michael's Churchyard in Charleston, South Carolina
3	William Cushing	September 13, 1810	Cushing Cemetery	Scituate	Massachusetts	Gravesite of Justice William Cushing at Cushing Memorial State Park in Scituate, Massachusetts
4	James Wilson	August 21, 1798	Christ Church North Garden (Note: Interred at this site in 1906, after initially being interred in the Johnston Cemetery at Hayes Plantation, Edenton, North Carolina.)	Philadelphia	Pennsylvania	
5	John Blair	August 31, 1800	Bruton Parish Episcopal Church Cemetery	Williamsburg	Virginia	Gravesite of Justice John Blair at Bruton Parish Episcopal Church Cemetery in Williamsburg, Virginia
6	James Iredell	October 20, 1799	Hayes Plantation Cemetery	Edenton	North Carolina	
7	Thomas Johnson	October 26, 1819	Mount Olivet Cemetery (Note: Interred at this site in 1913, after initially being interred in the All Saints Church churchyard in Frederick, Maryland.)	Frederick	Maryland	Gravesite of Justice Thomas Johnson at Mount Olivet Cemetery in Frederick, Maryland
8	William Paterson	September 9, 1806	Albany Rural Cemetery (Note: Interred at this site after initially being interred in the Van Renssalaer family vault at Van Rensselaer Manor, Albany, New York.)	Menands	New York	Gravesite of Justice William Paterson at Albany Rural Cemetery in Menands, New York
9	Samuel Chase	June 19, 1811	Old Saint Paul's Cemetery	Baltimore	Maryland	
10	^{CJ} Oliver Ellsworth	November 26, 1807	Palisado Cemetery	Windsor	Connecticut	Gravesite of Justice Oliver Ellsworth at Palisado Cemetery in Windsor, Connecticut
11	Bushrod Washington	November 26, 1829	Mount Vernon Burial Ground	Mount Vernon	Virginia	Gravesite of Justice Bushrod Washington at Mount Vernon Burial Ground in Mount Vernon, Virginia
12	Alfred Moore	October 15, 1810	St. Philip's Church Cemetery (Note: Interred at this site after initially being interred at Belfont Plantation in Bladen County, North Carolina.)	Smithville Township	North Carolina	
13	^{CJ} John Marshall	July 6, 1835	Shockoe Hill Cemetery	Richmond	Virginia	Gravesite of Justice John Marshall at Shockoe Hill Cemetery in Richmond, Virginia
14	William Johnson	August 24, 1834	Unknown for certain (Note: Johnson's body was to be interred at St. Philip's Episcopal Church Cemetery, Charleston, South Carolina, and there is a monument to Johnson at that location, but sources suggest that it was never transported there from New York.)	Charleston	South Carolina	
15	Henry Brockholst Livingston	March 18, 1823	Green-Wood Cemetery (Note: Interred at this site in 1844, after initially being interred in the Trinity Church churchyard in Manhattan.)	Brooklyn	New York	Gravesite of Justice Henry Livingston at Green-Wood Cemetery in New York, New York
16	Thomas Todd	February 7, 1826	Frankfort Cemetery (Note: Interred at this site after initially being interred in the Innes family cemetery in Frankfort, Kentucky.)	Frankfort	Kentucky	
17	Gabriel Duvall	March 6, 1844	Marietta Burial Grounds	Glenn Dale	Maryland	Gravesite of Justice Gabriel Duvall in Glenn Dale, Maryland
18	Joseph Story	September 10, 1845	Mount Auburn Cemetery	Cambridge	Massachusetts	Gravesite of Justice Joseph Story at Mount Auburn Cemetery in Cambridge, Massachusetts
19	Smith Thompson	December 18, 1843	Poughkeepsie Rural Cemetery	Poughkeepsie	New York	Gravesite of Justice Smith Thompson at Poughkeepsie Rural Cemetery in Poughkeepsie, New York
20	Robert Trimble	August 25, 1828	Paris Cemetery	Paris	Kentucky	Gravesite of Justice Robert Trimble at Paris Cemetery in Paris, Kentucky
21	John McLean	April 4, 1861	Spring Grove Cemetery	Cincinnati	Ohio	Gravesite of Justice John McLean at Spring Grove Cemetery in Cincinnati, Ohio
22	Henry Baldwin	April 21, 1844	Greendale Cemetery (Note: Interred at this site after initially being interred in the Bomford family vault at Kalorama, and then, in 1892, at Oak Hill Cemetery, both in Washington, D.C.)	Meadville	Pennsylvania	Grave of Justice Henry Baldwin
23	James Moore Wayne	July 5, 1867	Laurel Grove Cemetery	Savannah (Note: Gravesite farthest to the south is that of James Moore Wayne in Savannah, Georgia; farthest east is Nathan Clifford, Portland, Maine; farthest north is Pierce Butler, St. Paul, Minnesota; and farthest west is Sandra Day O'Connor, Duncan, Arizona.)	Georgia	
24	Roger B. Taney	October 12, 1864	St. John the Evangelist Cemetery	Frederick	Maryland	Gravesite of Justice Roger Taney at St. John the Evangelist Cemetery in Frederick, Maryland
25	Philip P. Barbour	February 25, 1841	Congressional Cemetery	Washington	District of Columbia	Gravesite of Justice Philip P. Barbour at Congressional Cemetery in Washington, D.C.
26	John Catron	May 30, 1865	Mount Olivet Cemetery	Nashville	Tennessee	
27	John McKinley	July 19, 1852	Cave Hill Cemetery	Louisville	Kentucky	
28	Peter Vivian Daniel	May 31, 1860	Hollywood Cemetery	Richmond	Virginia	
29	Samuel Nelson	December 13, 1873	Lakewood Cemetery	Cooperstown	New York	
30	Levi Woodbury	September 4, 1851	Harmony Grove Cemetery	Portsmouth	New Hampshire	Gravesite of Justice Levi Woodbury in Portsmouth, New Hampshire
31	Robert Cooper Grier	September 25, 1870	West Laurel Hill Cemetery	Bala Cynwyd	Pennsylvania	
32	Benjamin Robbins Curtis	September 15, 1874	Mount Auburn Cemetery	Cambridge	Massachusetts	Gravesite of Justice Benjamin Curtis at Mount Auburn Cemetery in Cambridge, Massachusetts
33	John Archibald Campbell	March 12, 1889	Green Mount Cemetery	Baltimore	Maryland	Gravesite of Justice John Campbell at Green Mount Cemetery in Baltimore, Maryland
34	Nathan Clifford	July 25, 1881	Evergreen Cemetery	Portland	Maine	
35	Noah Haynes Swayne	June 8, 1884	Oak Hill Cemetery	Washington	District of Columbia	Gravesite of Justice Noah Swayne at Oak Hill Cemetery in Washington, D.C.
36	Samuel Freeman Miller	October 13, 1890	Oakland Cemetery	Keokuk	Iowa	
37	David Davis	June 26, 1886	Evergreen Memorial Cemetery	Bloomington	Illinois	
38	Stephen Johnson Field	April 9, 1899	Rock Creek Cemetery	Washington	District of Columbia	Gravesite of Justice Stephen Field at Rock Creek Cemetery in Washington, D.C.
39	^{CJ} Salmon P. Chase	May 7, 1873	Spring Grove Cemetery (Note: Interred at this site in 1887, after initially being interred in Oak Hill Cemetery in Washington, D.C.)	Cincinnati	Ohio	Gravesite of Justice Salmon Chase at Spring Grove Cemetery in Cincinnati, Ohio
40	William Strong	August 19, 1895	Charles Evans Cemetery	Reading	Pennsylvania	Gravesite of Justice William Strong at Charles Evans Cemetery in Reading, Pennsylvania
41	Joseph P. Bradley	January 22, 1892	Mount Pleasant Cemetery	Newark	New Jersey	Gravesite of Justice Joseph Bradley at Mount Pleasant Cemetery in Newark, New Jersey
42	Ward Hunt	March 24, 1886	Forest Hill Cemetery	Utica	New York	
43	^{CJ} Morrison Waite	March 23, 1888	Woodlawn Cemetery	Toledo	Ohio	Gravesite of Justice Morrison Waite at Woodlawn Cemetery in Toledo, Ohio
44	John Marshall Harlan	October 14, 1911	Rock Creek Cemetery	Washington	District of Columbia	Gravesite of Justice John Harlan at Rock Creek Cemetery in Washington, D.C.
45	William Burnham Woods	May 14, 1887	Cedar Hill Cemetery	Newark	Ohio	
46	Stanley Matthews	March 22, 1889	Spring Grove Cemetery	Cincinnati	Ohio	Grave of Justice Stanley Matthews
47	Horace Gray	September 15, 1902	Mount Auburn Cemetery	Cambridge	Massachusetts	Gravesite of Justice Horace Gray at Mount Auburn Cemetery in Cambridge, Massachusetts
48	Samuel Blatchford	July 7, 1893	Green-Wood Cemetery	Brooklyn	New York	Gravesite of Justice Samuel Blatchford at Green-Wood Cemetery in New York, New York
49	Lucius Quintus Cincinnatus Lamar II	January 23, 1893	Oxford Memorial Cemetery (Note: Interred at this site in 1894, after initially being interred at Riverside Cemetery in Macon, Georgia.)	Oxford	Mississippi	
50	^{CJ} Melville Fuller	July 4, 1910	Graceland Cemetery	Chicago	Illinois	Grave of Justice Melville Fuller
51	David Josiah Brewer	March 28, 1910	Mount Muncie Cemetery	Lansing	Kansas	
52	Henry Billings Brown	September 4, 1913	Elmwood Cemetery	Detroit	Michigan	
53	George Shiras Jr.	August 2, 1924	Allegheny Cemetery	Pittsburgh	Pennsylvania	
54	Howell Edmunds Jackson	August 8, 1895	Mount Olivet Cemetery (Note: Interred at this site in 1906, after initially being interred in the Harding Family Mausoleum at Belle Meade Plantation near Nashville, Tennessee.)	Nashville	Tennessee	
55	^{CJ} Edward Douglass White	May 19, 1921	Oak Hill Cemetery	Washington	District of Columbia	Gravesite of Justice Edward White at Oak Hill Cemetery in Washington, D.C.
56	Rufus W. Peckham	October 24, 1909	Albany Rural Cemetery	Menands	New York	Gravesite of Justice Rufus Peckham at Albany Rural Cemetery in Menands, New York
57	Joseph McKenna	November 21, 1926	Mount Olivet Cemetery	Washington	District of Columbia	Gravesite of Justice Joseph McKenna at Mount Olivet Cemetery in Washington, D.C.
58	Oliver Wendell Holmes Jr.	March 6, 1935	Arlington National Cemetery	Arlington	Virginia	Gravesite of Justice Oliver Holmes at Arlington National Cemetery in Arlington, Virginia
59	William R. Day	July 9, 1923	West Lawn Cemetery	Canton	Ohio	
60	William Henry Moody	July 2, 1917	South Byfield Cemetery	Georgetown	Massachusetts	Gravesite of Justice William Moody at South Byfield Cemetery in Georgetown, Massachusetts
61	Horace Harmon Lurton	July 12, 1914	Greenwood Cemetery	Clarksville	Tennessee	
62	^{CJ} Charles Evans Hughes	August 27, 1948	Woodlawn Cemetery	The Bronx	New York	Gravesite of Justice Charles Hughes at Woodlawn Cemetery in New York, New York
63	Willis Van Devanter	February 8, 1941	Rock Creek Cemetery	Washington	District of Columbia	Gravesite of Justice Willis Van Devanter at Rock Creek Cemetery in Washington, D.C.
64	Joseph Rucker Lamar	January 2, 1916	Summerville Cemetery	Augusta	Georgia	
65	Mahlon Pitney	December 9, 1924	Evergreen Cemetery	Morristown	New Jersey	Gravesite of Justice Mahlon Pitney at Evergreen Cemetery in Morristown, New Jersey
66	James Clark McReynolds	August 24, 1946	Glenwood Cemetery	Elkton	Kentucky	Grave of Justice James Clark McReynolds
67	Louis Brandeis	October 5, 1941	Louis D. Brandeis School of Law	Louisville	Kentucky	
68	John Hessin Clarke	March 22, 1945	Lisbon Cemetery	Lisbon	Ohio	Grave of Justice John Hessin Clarke
69	^{CJ} William Howard Taft	March 8, 1930 (Note: Edward Terry Sanford and William Howard Taft both died on March 8, 1930; Sanford's death occurred approximately five hours before Taft's.)	Arlington National Cemetery	Arlington	Virginia	Gravesite of Justice William Taft at Arlington National Cemetery in Arlington, Virginia
70	George Sutherland	July 18, 1942	Cedar Hill Cemetery (Note: Interred at this site in 1958, after initially being interred at Abbey Mausoleum in Arlington County, Virginia.)	Suitland	Maryland	Gravesite of Justice George Sutherland at Cedar Hill Cemetery in Suitland, Maryland
71	Pierce Butler	November 16, 1939	Calvary Cemetery	Saint Paul	Minnesota	Gravesite of Justice Pierce Butler at Calvary Cemetery in St. Paul, Minnesota
72	Edward Terry Sanford	March 8, 1930	Greenwood Cemetery	Knoxville	Tennessee	Gravesite of Justice Edward Sanford at Greenwood Cemetery in Knoxville, Tennessee
73	^{CJ} Harlan F. Stone	April 22, 1946	Rock Creek Cemetery	Washington	District of Columbia	Gravesite of Justice Harlan Stone at Rock Creek Cemetery in Washington, D.C.
74	Owen Roberts	May 17, 1955	St. Andrew's Cemetery	West Vincent Township	Pennsylvania	Gravesite of Justice Owen Roberts at St. Andrew's Cemetery in West Vincent, Pennsylvania
75	Benjamin N. Cardozo	July 9, 1938	Beth Olam Cemetery	Cypress Hills	New York	Gravesite of Justice Benjamin Cardozo at Beth Olam Cemetery in New York, New York
76	Hugo Black	September 25, 1971	Arlington National Cemetery	Arlington	Virginia	Gravesite of Justice Hugo Black at Arlington National Cemetery in Arlington, Virginia
77	Stanley Forman Reed	April 2, 1980	Maysville Cemetery	Maysville	Kentucky	
78	Felix Frankfurter	February 22, 1965	Mount Auburn Cemetery	Cambridge	Massachusetts	Gravesite of Justice Felix Frankfurter at Mount Auburn Cemetery in Cambridge, Massachusetts
79	William O. Douglas	January 19, 1980	Arlington National Cemetery	Arlington	Virginia	Gravesite of Justice William Douglass at Arlington National Cemetery in Arlington, Virginia
80	Frank Murphy	July 19, 1949	Our Lady of Lake Huron Catholic Cemetery	Sand Beach Township (Harbor Beach)	Michigan	Gravesite of Justice Frank Murphy at Our Lady of Lake Huron Catholic Cemetery in Sand Beach Township, Michigan, near Harbor Beach
81	James F. Byrnes	April 9, 1972	Trinity Episcopal Cathedral Cemetery	Columbia	South Carolina	
82	Robert H. Jackson	October 9, 1954	Maple Grove Cemetery	Frewsburg	New York	Grave of Justice Robert H. Jackson
83	Wiley Blount Rutledge	September 10, 1949	Green Mountain Cemetery	Boulder	Colorado	
84	Harold Hitz Burton	October 28, 1964	Highland Park Cemetery	Highland Hills	Ohio	
85	^{CJ} Fred M. Vinson	September 8, 1953	Pine Hill Cemetery	Louisa	Kentucky	
86	Tom C. Clark	June 13, 1977	Restland Memorial Park	Dallas	Texas	
87	Sherman Minton	April 9, 1965	Holy Trinity Cemetery	New Albany	Indiana	Gravesite of Justice Sherman Minton at Holy Trinity Cemetery in New Albany, Indiana
88	^{CJ} Earl Warren	July 9, 1974	Arlington National Cemetery	Arlington	Virginia	Gravesite of Justice Earl Warren at Arlington National Cemetery in Arlington, Virginia
89	John Marshall Harlan	December 29, 1971	Emmanuel Episcopal Church Cemetery	Weston	Connecticut	Gravesite of Justice Harlan II at Emmanuel Episcopal Church Cemetery in Weston, Connecticut
90	William J. Brennan Jr.	July 24, 1997	Arlington National Cemetery	Arlington	Virginia	Gravesite of Justice William Brennan at Arlington National Cemetery in Arlington, Virginia
91	Charles Evans Whittaker	November 26, 1973	Forest Hill Cemetery	Kansas City	Missouri	
92	Potter Stewart	December 7, 1985	Arlington National Cemetery	Arlington	Virginia	Gravesite of Justice Potter Stewart at Arlington National Cemetery in Arlington, Virginia
93	Byron White	April 15, 2002	St. Johns Cathedral	Denver	Colorado	
94	Arthur Goldberg	January 19, 1990	Arlington National Cemetery	Arlington	Virginia	Gravesite of Justice Arthur Goldberg at Arlington National Cemetery in Arlington, Virginia
95	Abe Fortas	April 5, 1982	Cedar Hill Cemetery	Suitland	Maryland	
96	Thurgood Marshall	January 24, 1993	Arlington National Cemetery	Arlington	Virginia	Gravesite of Justice Thurgood Marshall at Arlington National Cemetery in Arlington, Virginia
97	^{CJ} Warren E. Burger	June 25, 1995	Arlington National Cemetery	Arlington	Virginia	Gravesite of Justice Warren Burger at Arlington National Cemetery in Arlington, Virginia
98	Harry Blackmun	March 4, 1999	Arlington National Cemetery	Arlington	Virginia	Gravesite of Justice Harry Blackmun at Arlington National Cemetery in Arlington, Virginia
99	Lewis F. Powell Jr.	August 25, 1998	Hollywood Cemetery	Richmond	Virginia	Gravesite of Justice Lewis Powell at Hollywood Cemetery in Richmond, Virginia
100	^{CJ} William Rehnquist	September 3, 2005	Arlington National Cemetery	Arlington	Virginia	Gravesite of Justice William Rehnquist at Arlington National Cemetery in Arlington, Virginia
101	John Paul Stevens	July 16, 2019	Arlington National Cemetery	Arlington	Virginia	
102	Sandra Day O'Connor	December 1, 2023	Lazy B Ranch	Duncan	Arizona	
103	Antonin Scalia	February 13, 2016	Fairfax Memorial Park	Fairfax	Virginia	Gravesite of Justice Antonin Scalia at Fairfax Memorial Park in Fairfax, Virginia
105	David Souter	May 8, 2025	Lakeside Cemetery	Wakefield	Massachusetts	
107	Ruth Bader Ginsburg	September 18, 2020	Arlington National Cemetery	Arlington	Virginia	

== See also ==
- List of burial places of presidents and vice presidents of the United States
