= North Atlantic & Gulf Steamship Company =

Former US Shipping Company

- Industry: Shipping
- Founded: 1932 in New York City, United States
- Key people: George V. Reilly; William M. Stevens; David H. Jackman

North Atlantic & Gulf Steamship Company was founded in New York City on February 13, 1932, by George V. Reilly, William M. Stevens, and David H. Jackman. The president of North Atlantic & Gulf Steamship Company in 1932 was Charles Walter Ulsh. North Atlantic & Gulf Steamship Company's treasurer and vice president was Clifton Waller Barrett. Charles Walter Ulsh and Clifton Waller Barrett founded the ship broker firm Ulsh & Barrett. Charles Walter Ulsh invited and patented a skid platform pallet for shipping. His United States patent #US1934389A is used for a stackable and nested skid platform.

== SS Lake Furnas ==
North Atlantic & Gulf Steamship Company purchased the SS Lake Furnas built in 1920 (ex SS Providence) in 1941 from Merchants and Miners Transportation Company. North Atlantic & Gulf Steamship Company renamed her SS Norindies. On March 26, 1942, the War Shipping Administration took over the ship for the war. But gave the charter to North Atlantic & Gulf Steamship Company. North Atlantic & Gulf Steamship Company operated her from March 26, 1942, to August 3, 1943. On August 3, 1943, War Shipping Administration purchased, the ship from North Atlantic & Gulf Steamship Company.

== World War II ==
North Atlantic & Gulf Steamship Company fleet of ships were used to help the World War II effort. During World War II North Atlantic & Gulf Steamship Company operated Merchant navy ships for the United States Shipping Board. During World War II J. H. Winchester & Company was active with charter shipping with the Maritime Commission and War Shipping Administration. North Atlantic & Gulf Steamship Company operated Liberty ships and Victory ships for the merchant navy. The ship was run by its North Atlantic & Gulf Steamship Company crew and the US Navy supplied United States Navy Armed Guards to man the deck guns and radio.

== Ships ==
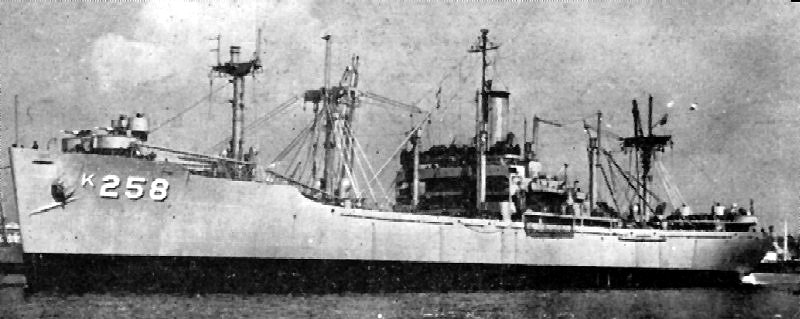
A Victory ship of World War II

Liberty ship of World War II

  - Liberty ships operated:
- Spetsae
- Stage Door Canteen
- Joseph I. Kemp
- SS Isaac Mayer Wise
- Rebecca Boone
- William R. Lewis
- Penelope Barker Torpedoed and sunk by U.271 in Barents Sea at 73.20N 23.20W
- John M. Brooke
- Johns Hopkins
- Frank Dale N3-S ship
  - Victory ships operated:
- Rollins Victory
- Mahanoy City Victory
- Waterbury Victory
  - Other
- Norlandia built in 1919

== See also ==
- World War II United States Merchant Navy
