= Miss Jenny =

- Espionage activity
- Country: Britain
- Allegiance: Loyalist
- Active: around 1781

Miss Jenny (fl. 1781) was a spy on the side of British loyalists during the American Revolutionary War.

Miss Jenny, a French-speaking woman whose real-life identity was never confirmed, infiltrated the French troops who fought on the American side and reported the movements of French and American troops to the British headquarters in New York City. She was reportedly in her late teens or early twenties in 1781.

== Career ==
Miss Jenny is considered an important factor in the British military movements in the summer of 1781. At that time, she reported to the British that the French and Americans were planning an attack on the city of New York. She was on her way to cross the lines to the city to confirm this personally when she was caught by a French guard. After having been nearly raped, she was brought to the French camp and questioned. She claimed she was searching for her French-Canadian father.

The French turned her to General George Washington's camp, where she was further questioned, but she held to her story. She was then turned over to French custody again, and after a last try to make her confess, they gave up. Before releasing her, they inflicted the informal punishment of cutting off her hair as a sign of public shame. Due to the contemporary ideas about the intelligence of women, female spies were not always considered much of a threat.

Miss Jenny continued on her way to the British camp in New York and reported everything she had observed. Based on her and other spies' reports, the general in charge kept his troops in New York. However, the French and Americans later changed their plan and attacked Yorktown instead.

== Legacy ==
There are also songs written about Miss Jenny.

== See also ==
- Ann Bates
- Intelligence in the American Revolutionary War
- Intelligence operations in the American Revolutionary War
