= John G. Zehmer Jr. =

American art historian

John Granderson Zemmer Jr. (1942 – February 7, 2016) was an architectural historian, preservationist, photographer, and author of architectural history in Virginia and North Carolina, especially in Richmond, Virginia. His work includes documentation and an impressive catalog of photographs of historic properties. He produced several books on historic sites and is credited with helping preserve several buildings.

== Biography ==
Zehmer was born in McKenney, Dinwiddie County, and moved to Richmond in 1974. He received bachelor's and master's degrees in architectural history from the University of Virginia and served in the Peace Corps in Malaysia.

Zehmer served as Richmond's first senior planner for historic preservation. He was also a director for the Valentine Museum and was the executive director of the Historic Richmond Foundation from 1984 until 1998. He also served on the staff of the Virginia Department of Historic Resources from 1999 until 2004 and was director of the Valentine Museum from 1974 to 1981.

Zehmer was involved in helping preserve and readapt Linden Row on West Franklin Street and downtown Richmond's National Theater. He also helped preserve Monumental Church, the Bolling Haxall House, Virginia Executive Mansion, Monument Avenue Historic District, Broad Street Historic District, Wickham-Valentine House and Richmond's Old City Hall building.

His books include the photo illustrated Church Hill Old & Historic Districts (2011) which Edwin Slipek of Architecture Richmond described as "an indispensable resource". He also wrote Hayes; The Plantation, Its People, and Their Papers with color photo illustrations by John O. Peters about the house in Chowan County designed by British architect William Nichols and built for wealthy planter James Cathcart Johnston including documents related to the management of the plantation during the antebellum period.

Zehmer died on February 7, 2016, at a retirement community in Richmond. His ashes were buried in the Good Shepherd Episcopal Churchyard in McKenney. A bill to honor Zehmer was passed in the Virginia House of Delegates in 2016 and presented to the Virginia Senate.

== Bibliography ==
- Hayes: The Plantation, Its People, and Their Papers (North Caroliniana Society Imprints) Jan 1, 2007 by John G. Zehmer
- Old Richmond Today (Oct 1, 1988) by John G. Zehmer
- Church Hill Old & Historic Districts Church Hill: The St. John's Church Historic District (1991) by John Zehmer and photography by Richard Cheek
- Church Hill The St. John's Church Historic District (1991) by Marguerite Crumley and John G. Zehmer
- Two Mecklenburg Towns: Architectural and Historical Surveys of Boydton and Clarksville
- Old Richmond today (1988) by Richard Cheek and John G. Zehmer
