= Homespun movement =

18th-century boycott movement in United States

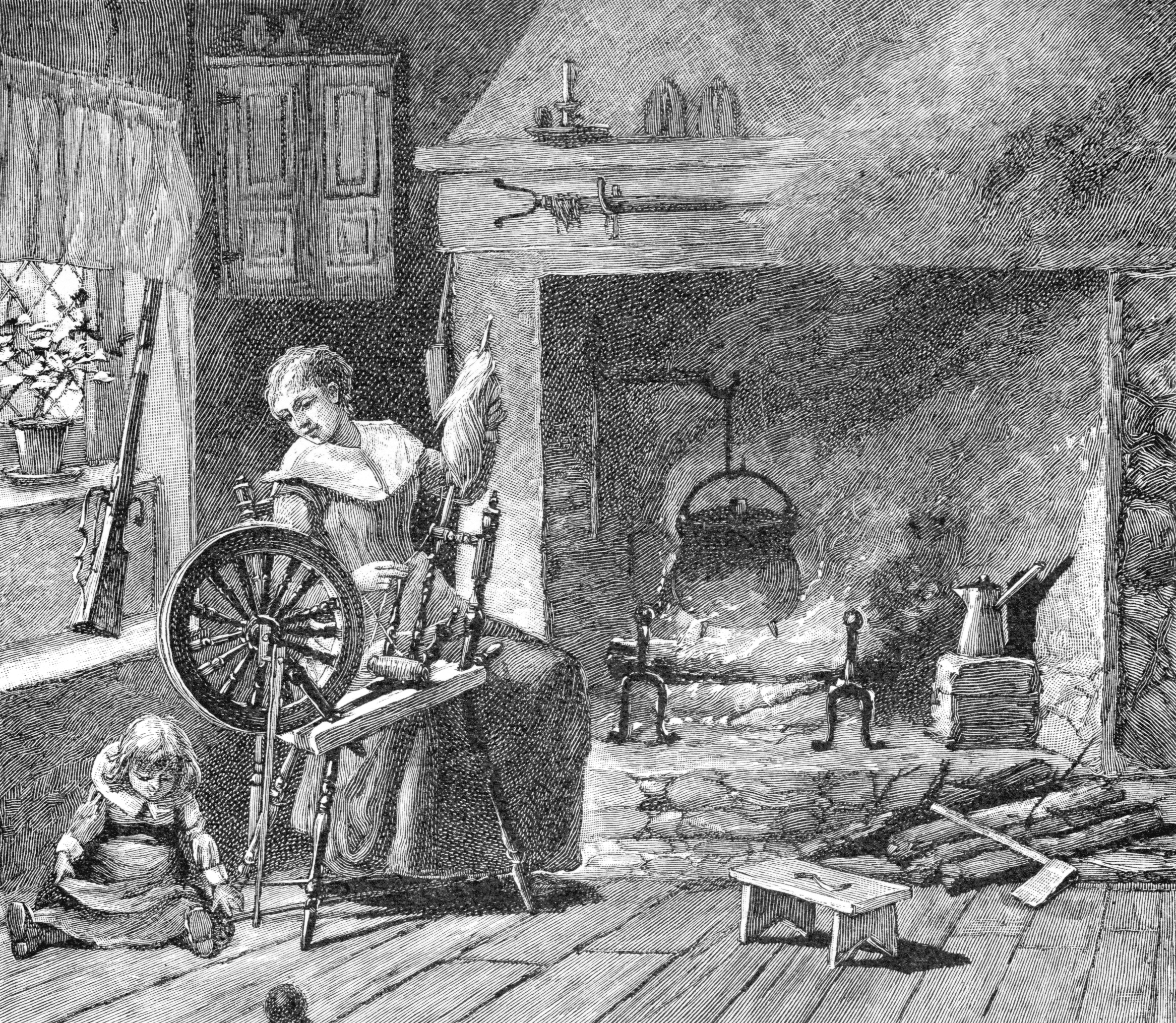
A New England kitchen, engraving in A Brief History of the United States (1885) by Joel Dorman Steele

The homespun movement was started in 1767 by Quakers in Boston, Massachusetts, to encourage the purchase of goods, especially apparel, manufactured in the American Colonies. The movement was created in response to the British Townshend Acts of 1767 and 1768, in the early stages of the American Revolution.

== Background ==
In the 17th century, the Kingdom of England was vested in protecting its textile manufacturing, one of its largest industries. The British discouraged their colonies in America from producing wool, expecting Americans to import textile from England and in return serve as its suppliers of raw materials. When the colonies began skirting this arrangement, the Wool Act 1698 was passed barring them from exporting wool, wool yarn, and wool cloth. This spurred a movement to instead use flax and hemp to make home spun textiles, including linen, rather than purchase from the English.

== American Revolution ==
Homespun became a term used to describe all American-made cotton, linen, and wool textile. With the popularity of the boycott of British goods, wearing homespun clothing became a patriotic symbol of the fight against British rule. Women in particular took a leading role in the movement by avoiding imported satin and silk but instead using locally made materials to spin cloths. They made spinning into a social event.

== See also ==
- Women in the American Revolution
- Virginia cloth
