= Women in the American Revolution =

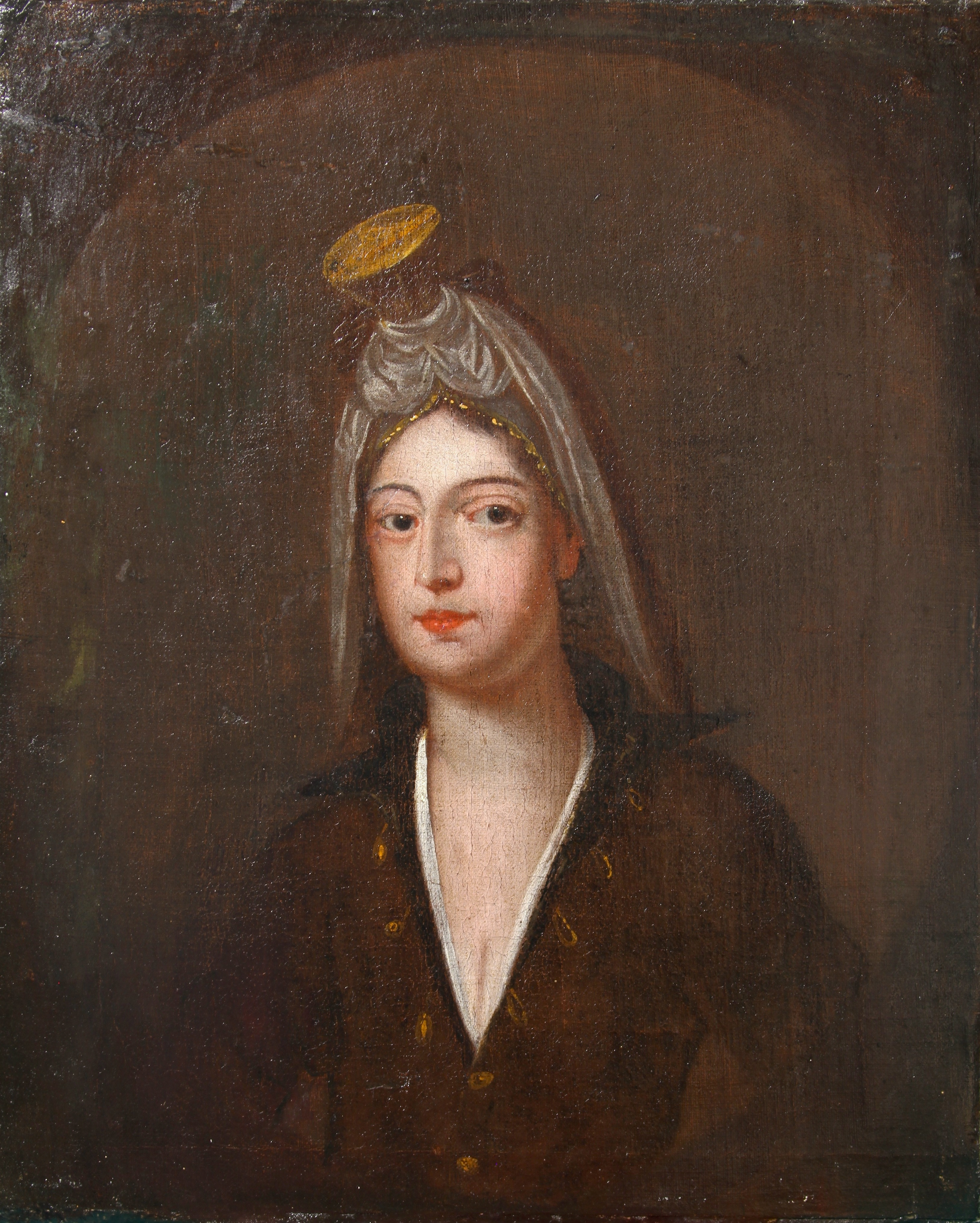
1765 portrait of a woman wearing a musket and powder horn crown and militia-inspired outfit to signal her support of the patriots

Women in the American Revolution played various roles depending on their social status, race and political views.

The American Revolutionary War took place as a result of increasing tensions between Great Britain and the Thirteen Colonies. American colonists responded by forming the Continental Congress and going to war with the British. The war would not have been able to progress as it did without the widespread ideological, as well as material, support of both male and female inhabitants of the colonies. While formal politics did not include women, ordinary domestic behaviors became charged with political significance as women confronted the Revolution. Halting previously everyday activities, such as drinking British tea or ordering clothes from Britain, demonstrated colonial opposition during the years leading up to and during the war.

Although the war raised the question of whether or not a woman could be a Patriot, women across separate colonies demonstrated that they could. Support was mainly expressed through traditional female occupations in the home, the domestic economy, and their husbands' and fathers' businesses. Women participated by boycotting British goods, producing goods for soldiers, spying on the British, and serving in the armed forces disguised as men.

Just as the significant men of the Revolution are referred to as the "Founding Fathers", the term Founding Mothers is occasionally used to refer to the most significant women of the American Revolution.

The war also affected the lives of women who remained Loyalists to the British Crown, or those who remained politically neutral; in many cases, the impact was devastating.

== European American women ==
=== Support in the domestic realm ===
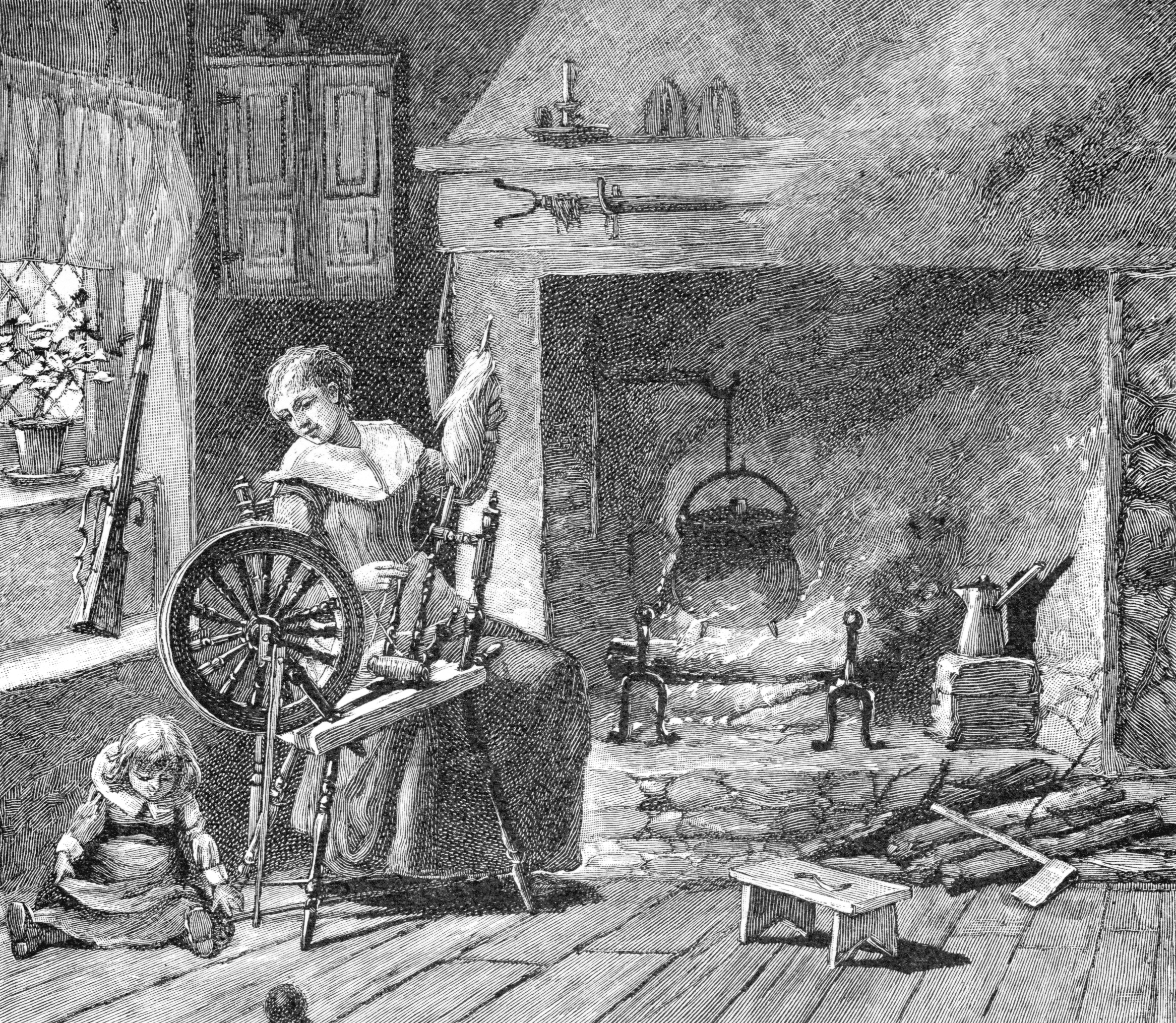
Spinning in the colonial kitchen

==== Homespun movement ====
Women in the era of the Revolution were, for the most part, responsible for managing the household. Connected to these activities, women worked in the homespun movement. Instead of wearing or purchasing clothing made of imported British materials, Patriot women continued a long tradition of weaving, and spun their cloth to make clothing for their families. In addition to the boycotts of British textiles, the homespun movement served the Continental Army by producing needed clothing and blankets. Benjamin Franklin's youngest sister, Jane Mecom, could be called on for her soap recipe, and even instructions on how to build the soap-making forms. Wearing "clothes of your make and spinning," or "homespun," was a peaceful way of expressing support for the Patriot cause.

==== Nonimportation and nonconsumption ====
Nonimportation and nonconsumption became major weapons in the arsenal of American opposition to British taxation policies. Women played a major role in this method of defiance by denouncing silks, satins, and other luxuries in favor of homespun clothing generally made in spinning and quilting bees, sending a strong message of colonial unity to the British government. In 1769, Christopher Gadsden made a direct appeal to colonial women, saying that "our political salvation, at this crisis, depends altogether upon the strictest economy, that the women could, with propriety, have the principal management thereof." (To the Planters, Mechanics, and Freeholders of the Province of South Carolina, No Ways Concerned in the Importation of British Manufactures, June 22, 1769.)

As managers of the domestic economy, housewives used their purchasing power to support the Patriot cause. Women refused to purchase British-manufactured goods for use in their homes. The tea boycott, for example, was a relatively mild way for a woman to identify herself and her household as part of the Patriot war effort. While the Boston Tea Party of 1773 is the most widely recognized manifestation of this boycott, for years previous to that explosive action, Patriot women had been refusing to consume that very same British product as a political statement. The Edenton Tea Party represented one of the first coordinated and publicized political actions by women in the colonies. Fifty-one women in Edenton, North Carolina, led by Penelope Barker, signed an agreement officially agreeing to boycott tea and other British products and sent it to British newspapers. Similar boycotts extended to a variety of British goods, and women instead opted in favor of purchasing or making "American" goods. Even though these "non-consumption boycotts" depended on national policy (formulated by men), it was women who enacted them in the household spheres in which they reigned.

During the Revolution, buying American products became a patriotic gesture. Also, frugality (a lauded feminine virtue before the years of the Revolution) likewise became a political statement as households were asked to contribute to the wartime efforts.

==== Other civilian activities ====
Women were asked to put their homes into public service for the quartering of American soldiers.

Women helped the Patriot cause through organizations such as the Ladies Association in Philadelphia. The women of Philadelphia collected funds to assist in the war effort, which Martha Washington then took directly to her husband, General George Washington. Other states subsequently followed the example set by founders Esther de Berdt Reed (wife of the Pennsylvania governor, Joseph Reed) and Sarah Franklin Bache (daughter of Benjamin Franklin). In 1780, the colonies raised over $300,000 through these female-run organizations.

Mercy Otis Warren wrote scathing satirical plays that damaged the reputations of local Crown officials such as Governor Thomas Hutchinson and attorney general Jonathan Sewall. Poet Hannah Griffitts wrote verses urging Pennsylvania women to boycott British goods. Both women published their work anonymously.

The Revolution created food shortages and drove up prices. Women were among the food rioters who conducted over 30 raids on storehouses between 1776 and 1779, seizing goods from merchants they considered unreasonable. In Boston, a group of women marched down to a warehouse where a merchant was holding coffee that he refused to sell. They accosted the owner, forced him to turn over his keys to the warehouse, and confiscated the coffee.

=== Camp followers ===
Some women were economically unable to maintain their households in their husband's absence or wished to be by their side. Known as camp followers, these women followed the Continental Army, serving the soldiers and officers as washerwomen, cooks, nurses, seamstresses, supply scavengers, and occasionally as soldiers and spies. The women that followed the army were at times referred to as "necessary nuisances" and "baggage" by commanding officers, but at other times were widely praised. These women helped the army camps run smoothly. Prostitutes were also present, but they were a worrisome presence to military leaders particularly because of the possible spread of venereal diseases.

Wives of some of the superior officers (Martha Washington, for example) visited the camps frequently. Unlike poorer women present in the army camps, the value of these well-to-do women to the army was symbolic or spiritual, rather than practical. Their presence was a declaration that everyone made sacrifices for the war cause.

Specific population numbers vary from claims that 20,000 women marched with the army to more conservative estimates that females formed 3% of camp populations. Women joined up with army regiments for various reasons: fear of starvation, rape, loneliness, and imminent poverty- either as a last resort or following their husbands. Camp women were subject to the same commanders as the soldiers and were expelled for expressing autonomy. Army units in areas hard hit by war or in enemy-occupied territory housed more women than those in safe areas, most likely because women in battle-ridden areas sought the protection of the Continental Army.

=== Women soldiers ===
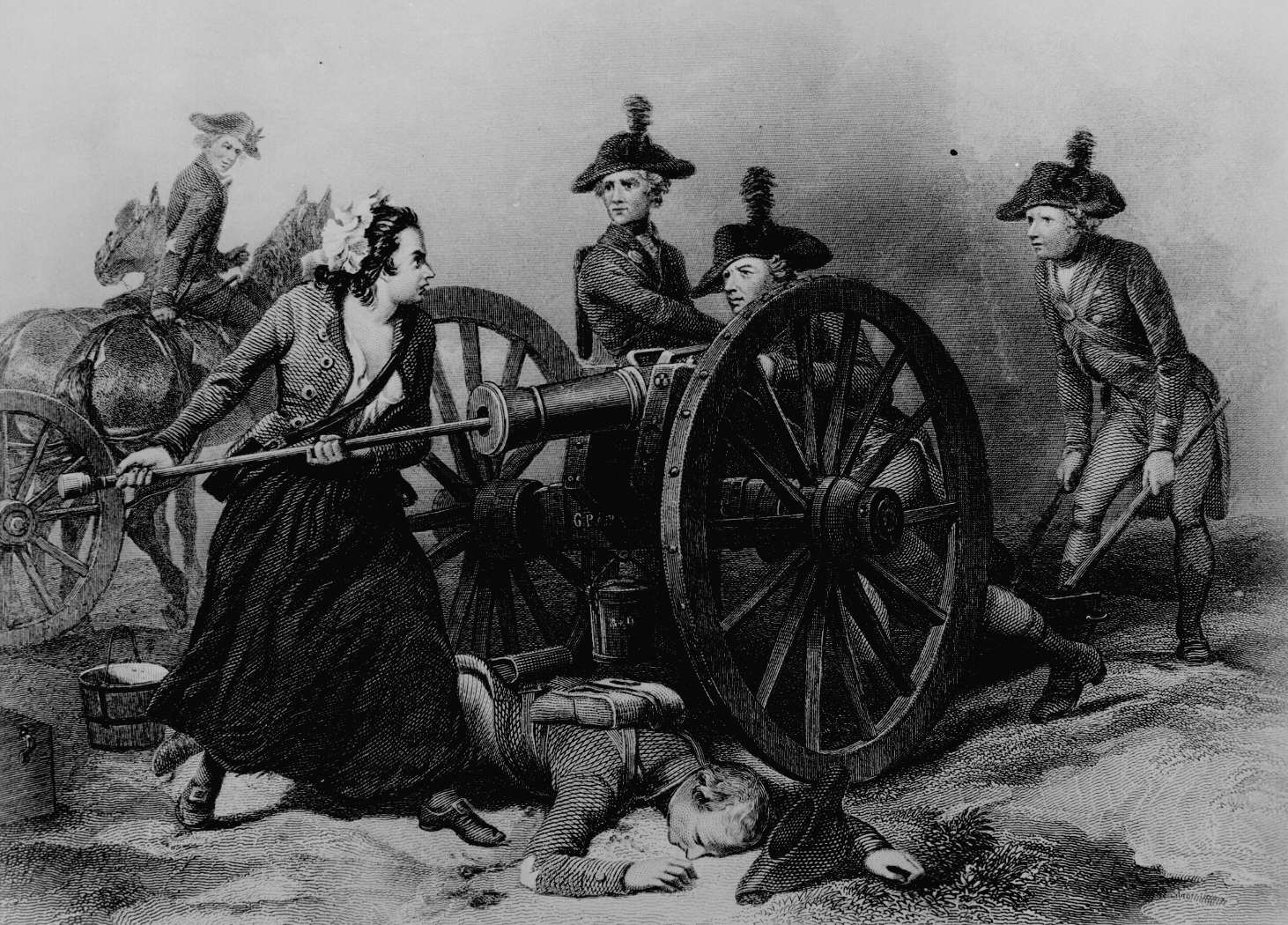
Molly Pitcher loading cannon at the Battle of Monmouth, June 28, 1778

Women who fought in the war were met with an ambivalence that fluctuated between admiration and contempt, depending on the particular woman's motivation and activity. Devotion to following a man was admired, while those who seemed enticed by the enlistment bounty warranted the scorn of enlisted men. Anna Maria Lane and Margaret Corbin fit under the first category, while Anne Bailey (under the name Samuel Gay) belonged to the second. Anne Bailey was discharged, fined, and put in jail for two weeks. Anne Smith was condemned for her attempt to join the army to secure the enlistment fee. Deborah Samson served in the Continental Army as Private Robert Shurtleff for over a year; when her gender was discovered, she was honorably discharged and granted a veteran's pension by the state of Massachusetts.

The "Molly Pitcher" of legend is likely a composite character based on several women who carried water to the troops (presumably in a pitcher), either for them to drink, or to cool down the cannons. Some historians believe her story is based on that of Mary Ludwig Hays and Margaret Corbin.

Some women fought in combat without leaving home; for example, Nancy Hart of Georgia reportedly shot two Loyalist soldiers in her kitchen, and held several others at gunpoint until help arrived. Martha Bratton blew up her husband's cache of gunpowder before it could be stolen by Loyalists. When British troops occupied the home of Rebecca Brewton Motte, she permitted Patriot forces to destroy it.

Other Patriot women concealed army dispatches and letters containing sensitive military information underneath their petticoats as they rode through enemy territory to deliver it. Deborah Sampson, Harriet Prudence Patterson Hall, and Lydia Darragh all managed to sneak important information past the British to their American compatriots. On the night of April 26, 1777, sixteen-year-old Sybil Ludington is said to have ridden 40 miles through the villages of Putnam County, New York, knocking on farmhouse doors to warn militiamen that British troops were on their way to Danbury, Connecticut. She has received widespread recognition as the female Paul Revere; a report in The New England Quarterly says there is little evidence backing the story, and whether the ride occurred is questioned.

=== Women poets ===
Instead of fighting physically, many women chose to fight using their words; women at the time were able to catalog significant events throughout the war within their poetry about their struggles for genuine equality as well as the terror of their husbands or family members that were at risk as they chose to fight. One well-known and influential female poet of the time was Annis Boudinot Stockton; a member of the Mid-Atlantic Writing Circle, Stockton wrote poetry about several historic events including the Revolutionary War. Alongside being a member of the Mid-Atlantic Writing Circle, she was the only woman to join the American Whig Society, for which she guarded sensitive documents during the war. Another influential poet during this time was Elizabeth Graeme Fergusson; another member of the Mid-Atlantic Writing Circle, Fergusson was only lightly supportive of the American Revolution in comparison to Stockton. Fergusson's poetry tended to be more emotional as well; through her work shines a glimpse into the lives of married women throughout the Revolutionary War.

== African American women ==
Although the American Revolution is famous for its rhetoric of liberty and equality, one of the most downtrodden groups in the soon-to-be United States is all but forgotten in contemporary scholarship. African-American women, the majority of whom were slaves, played an important role in the war but most ultimately gained much less than they had hoped at its inception. The majority of African Americans in the 1770s lived as slaves, both in the South and the North.

=== Freedom lawsuits ===
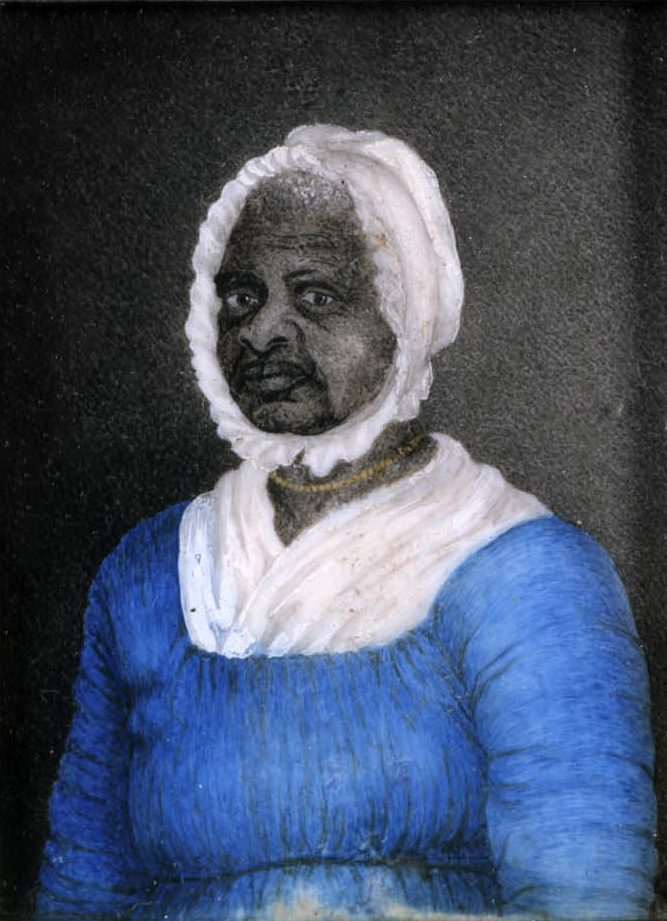
A portrait of Elizabeth Freeman.

Between 1716 and 1783, fourteen northern black women brought civil lawsuits to gain freedom. Black women brought freedom suits for one of the following legal technicalities: there had been a fraudulent sale; the plaintiff's mother was not black (enslavement was determined by one's mother's status), or the plaintiff had entered a manumission agreement and the documentation had disappeared. Elizabeth Freeman is arguably the best known of these plaintiffs. She brought "the first legal test of the constitutionality of slavery in Massachusetts" in 1781, with Brom & Bett v. J. Ashley Esq. The state legislature never outlawed slavery outright, but its 1780 Bill of Rights declared all men free and equal; Freeman effectively used this rhetoric to challenge slavery forever in Massachusetts. Along with Brom, another of her owner's slaves, Freeman, won her freedom in 1781. Similarly, in 1782 a slave woman named Belinda petitioned the Massachusetts Legislature, not for her freedom, but for compensation for the fifty years she served as a slave. However, not all states followed Massachusetts' example so quickly: in 1810 there were still 27,000 slaves living in the Northern states.

In the tense years leading up to the war, Britain recognized that slavery was a weak point of the American colonists. Indeed, unrest in slave communities was greatest in the two decades surrounding the American Revolution. In January 1775, a proposal was made in the British House of Commons for general emancipation in all British territories, a political maneuver intended to humble "the high aristocratic spirit of Virginia and the Southern Colonies." Slaves in the colonies recognized a certain British openness to their claims: in 1774, a "great number of blacks" petitioned General Thomas Gage, the British commander-in-chief of America and the governor of Massachusetts Bay, for their freedom.

=== Dunmore's Proclamation ===
Slavery was the backbone of Southern society and the British reasoned that dismantling it would undermine Southern ability to wage war. In April 1775, Lord Dunmore and the governor of Virginia, appropriated the colony's store of gunpowder because he suspected the Virginia Assembly of rebellious sentiments. This precipitated an armed uprising. From his warship off the coast of Virginia, the governor issued a proclamation, which declared martial law and offered freedom for "all indentured servants, Negroes, and others...that are able and willing to bear arms." Like the 1775 House of Commons proposal, Dunmore's Proclamation was intended to scare the white slaveholders of Virginia and to encourage black slaves to abandon their masters, instead of being born out of abolitionist sentiments.

About a third of all of the slaves who responded to Dunmore's Proclamation were women. In the colonial period, approximately 1/8 of all runaways were women. The small percentage of women attempting escape was because they were the anchors of slave family life. Most women would not leave without their families, especially their children, and since running in large groups increased the odds of capture exponentially, many women simply chose not to run at all. If slave women did leave their owners, it was often to attempt to reunite with family members who had been sold away.

Of the men that flooded Lord Dunmore's camp, some saw combat. Dunmore formed an "Ethiopian Regiment" of approximately five hundred of these former slaves and put them to work fighting their former masters. Often their wives followed them, working as cooks, laundresses, and nurses in camp. Some served as the personal servants of British officers.

=== Philipsburg Proclamation ===
In June 1776, General Henry Clinton similarly promised that any slave who fled to a British camp would have "full security to follow within these Lines, any occupation which he shall think proper." Like the preceding proclamation by Lord Dunmore, Clinton's was self-interested and ambivalent; he was alarmed by the prospect of slaves joining the Continental Army on being promised freedom and thus bolstering the numbers of the army. However, Southern slaveholders saw Clinton's Philipsburg Proclamation as an attack on their property and way of life and an invitation to anarchy. The Proclamation aroused much anti-British sentiment and became a rallying cry for Southern Patriots.

Most of the slaves that joined General Clinton after his Philipsburg Proclamation left their homes in family groups. Clinton attempted to register these blacks to control the numerous masterless men who were viewed as a threat to peace and order. In the registration process, Clinton returned all those slaves that had run away from Loyalist sympathizers. Of the slaves permitted to stay, the division of labor was highly gendered. Men were generally employed in the engineering and Royal Artillery departments of the army as carpenters, wheelwrights, smiths, sawyers, equipment menders, wagon and platform builders, and menders, etc. Both men and women made musket cartridges and butchered and preserved meat for the hungry army. Southern black women and children who knew the territory often served as guides to the confusing, swampy territories.

The British authorities in America claimed some escaped slaves as crown property and put them to work on public works projects or, more commonly, agriculture. Agricultural labor was vital because the large British army needed constant food supplies and it was expensive to ship food from England. These slaves were promised manumission in return for their service.

Many Southern slaveholders "refugeed" their slaves to prevent them from escaping and/or being killed during the war. They force-marched slaves to holdings out of the way of the war, usually in Florida, Louisiana, or the West Indies.

=== Slaves in the Continental Army ===
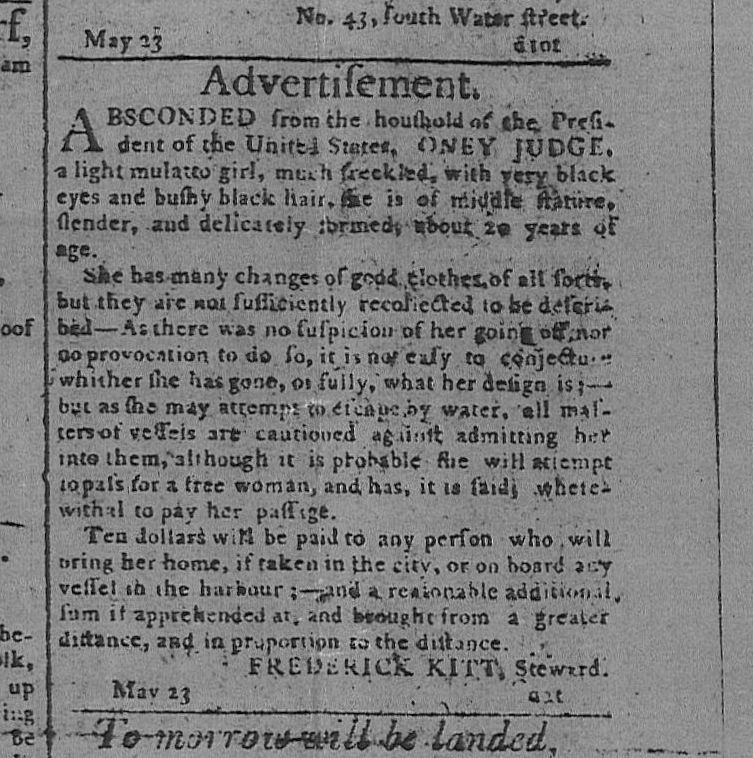
Advertisement seeking Oney Judge, an enslaved woman who fled the household of George Washington and escaped to freedom

Like the British, the new American government recognized that blacks were potentially a numerous source of recruits. However, George Washington was initially reluctant to encourage slaves to fight in exchange for freedom because of racially-based objections and because he feared numerous black recruits that he could not control. Therefore, at the onset of the war, only free blacks, a tiny percent of the population, were allowed to fight. In the fall of 1776, when the Continental Congress asked the states for more battalions, they suggested that the states round up more troops "by draft, from their militias, or in any other way." This was interpreted as authorization to recruit black males, slave or free.

In the South, black slave women were vital to the Patriot cause. They made up the bulk of the workforce that built and repaired the fortifications used during the sieges of Savannah, Charleston, and other low country towns and cities, and were similarly promised freedom for their service.

The period directly following the war was one of much hope and indecision for African Americans. Many expected the new country would live up to its ideals and abolish slavery. However, slavery was in fact built into the new Constitution – and even in many northern states, where slavery was neither prevalent nor particularly profitable, it took years and many court challenges to gradually abolish slavery.

=== Migration to the North ===
There was a massive migration, not unlike the Great Migration, of blacks to urban areas in the North after the close of the war. This migration was largely female. Before the Revolution, Northern urban populations were overwhelmingly male; by 1806, women outnumbered men four to three in New York City. Increasing this disparity was that the maritime industry was the largest employer of black males in the post-Revolutionary War period, taking many young black men away to sea for several years at a time. The rural African American population in the North remained predominately male.

Most free urban blacks in the North were employed in "service trades," including cooking and catering, cleaning stables, cutting hair and driving coaches. Family life was often broken up in these urban black communities. Many families lost members in the Revolution, either to the chaos of the time or back to slavery. Many employers refused to house whole families of blacks, preferring to board only their "domestic" woman laborer. Despite these challenges, many black women made efforts to support and maintain ties to their nuclear kin.

In the Pennsylvania colony, for instance, church records document many black unions. Especially since women held as slaves needed masters' permission to wed, "there are enough records to point out that Black women had a value for solidifying the family structure according to the laws of the colony". Those families that did live together often took in boarders to supplement income or shared a dwelling with another black family or more, contributing to the nontraditional shape of black family life in the post-Revolutionary War period.

In the South, broken families increased as slavery became more entrenched and expanded westward. For example, in the Chesapeake region, agricultural and economic patterns changed after the war, with many planters moving away from labor-intensive tobacco as a cash crop and diversifying their plantings. Many slaves were sold, usually to the Lower South or West, where slave agriculture was expanding. Of those slaves that were not sold, many men with skills were hired out, taking them away from their families.

Following the war, significant numbers of African American women and men relocated to Nova Scotia and the British West Indies. While many moved with their Loyalist masters, others relocated independently. For example, enslaved women living in Philadelphia, rather than waiting for their husbands to return from fighting for the colonists, left with the British who progressively departed in the early 1780s. These African American women moved of their own accord to Great Britain, Nova Scotia, and the West Indies –in search of a better life.

Another way that black women in the North tried to empower themselves and their children after the Revolution was through education. Early black women's organizations were local efforts to support their children's access to schooling. For example, Dinah Chase Whipple, a young widow, and mother of seven founded the Ladies African Charitable Society of Portsmouth in New Hampshire. The Ladies Society was "a highly practical undertaking designed to provide financial backing for a school two sisters-in-law ran out of their home".

Although the rhetoric of the Revolution brought much promise of change, that promise was largely unfulfilled for African Americans, especially African American women. Most women's status did not change appreciably. If anything, family life became more unstable in the south and, although slavery was gradually abolished in the north, economic opportunities and family stability slowly diminished in urban areas. However, black women contributed significantly on both the Patriot and Loyalist sides, and have thus far gone unheralded.

A few exceptions include Phillis Wheatley, an enslaved woman in Boston who became the first African American published poet; Mammy Kate of Georgia, who saved the life of Stephen Heard by smuggling him out of a British prison in a laundry basket; and Sally St. Clair of South Carolina, a woman of African and French ancestry, who passed as a man and served as a gunner in the Continental Army until she was killed in action during the siege of Savannah.

== Native American women ==
After the conclusion of the French and Indian War, the various colonies of the Thirteen Colonies claimed territory beyond the Appalachian Mountains. To try and avert war between the colonists and the Native Americans, King George III issued the Royal Proclamation of 1763, forbidding the Americans from settling beyond the Appalachian Mountains, among other things. The settlers, infuriated at what they perceived to be imperial overreach, continued to encroach westwards, albeit at a slower rate. As the American Revolutionary War drew near, most British Army units were stationed in New York and Boston, leaving the western frontier devoid of any military authority. This left the region in the hand of the American settlers and the Indian tribes, who engaged in violent conflicts during and after the war.

Several historians claim that contact with whites resulted in the displacement of women from their traditional spheres, both as a result of war-related upheavals and specific American policy after the war. Post-Revolutionary War guidelines called for the "civilization" of Native peoples, and which meant turning a population from a hunting-based society to an agricultural one, even though almost all Native American societies did practice agriculture—the women farmed. However, U.S. policymakers believed that farming could not be a significant part of Native life if women were the main contributors to the operation. Thus, the American government instead encouraged Native women to take up spinning and weaving and attempted to force men to farm, reversing gender roles and causing severe social problems that ran contrary to Native cultural mores.

=== Iroquois women ===
At the outset of the Revolutionary War, it was unclear which side the Native American tribes would choose to join. For the Iroquois Confederacy, they mostly chose to side with the British, thanks to their long alliance with the British since the early 18th century. Many Iroquois were fearful of American settlers encroaching on their lands, and saw an alliance with the British as the best way to prevent this actuality. Individuals such as Joseph Brant were significant in convincing their fellow Iroquois to join the war.

As a result of this alliance, the American Major General John Sullivan and his soldiers burned and destroyed about forty Iroquois towns in what is now upstate New York, displacing thousands of Iroquois inhabitants. This campaign obliterated hundreds of acres of crops and orchards, which had largely been the domain of the agricultural women, and served to kill thousands of Iroquois (including women), both outright and through the ensuing starvation.

=== Catawba women ===
Before the American Revolution, relations between the Catawba people and the American colonists were cautiously hostile, as neither side was interested in starting a war. Tensions led to conflict, particularly over land. While settlers believed in private property and put up fences to mark their lands, the Catawba believed that no person could claim land forever, and tore the fences down. Catawba men roamed the countryside in search of game, while settlers considered hunters trespassers, and wrecked their hunting camps. The settlers brought with them new methods of farming which profoundly affected Catawba daily life. Like every society heavily dependent upon agriculture, the Catawba oriented their existence to that pursuit. Colonists' crops required enclosures, schedules, and practices unfamiliar to Catawba cultivators. These changes particularly affected women, who had traditionally farmed while the men would hunt. As with other Indian groups, the Catawba nation could not maintain traditional ways of life. To survive, they found ways of living with the settlers. The nation started to trade with settlers in household goods made by Catawba women, who turned traditional crafts into a profitable business. As early as 1772, Catawba women peddled their crafts to local farmers.

One of the most successful ways that the Catawba nation improved relations with settlers was by participating in the American Revolution. Its location gave it little choice in the matter; Superintendent of Southern Indians John Stuart observed in 1775, "they are domiciliated and dispersed thro' the Settlements of north and South Carolina." In July 1775, two Catawba arrived in Charleston to learn more about the dispute between the crown and the colonists. The rebels' Council of Safety sent the representatives home with a letter explaining the colonists' grievances, reminding Catawba of their friendship with South Carolina, promising trade and pay for Indians who served, and warning what would happen if the nation refused to serve. Over the next eight years, the Catawba would fight for the Patriot cause, fighting against loyalist militia.

During the Revolution, Catawba warriors fought alongside American troops at many battles throughout the South. The Indians who remained at home often provided food to Patriots. Since traditional Catawba gender roles prescribed women and children as agricultural preparers, wartime responsibility of providing for the Patriots fell heavily on women. Several Catawba also served as informal goodwill ambassadors to their neighbors. One such person was Sally New River, a woman who enjoyed both the respect of her people and the affection of local whites. When visitors arrived unannounced, Sally New River made sure they were provided for. She spent much time with the Spratt family, whose patriarch was the first white man to lease Catawba land. Fifty years after her death, local whites still recalled "old aunt Sally" with affection.

Overall, however, the Catawba's role in the war has been termed "rather negligible"; with so few men to commit to the cause, it does seem unlikely that the nation determined the outcome of any battle. But the significance of their contribution lay in their active and visible support. While their alliance with the Patriots helped them fit into a rapidly changing environment—in 1782, the state legislature sent the nation five hundred bushels of corn to tide them over until summer and both paid them for their service in the army and reimbursed them for the livestock they had supplied—the settler's temporarily favorable impression of the Catawba did not guarantee a secure future. The Indians' continued indifference to Christianity frustrated the American colonists, who tried to educate select members at the College of William & Mary in hopes that these people would return to their Catawba homes converted, and ready to convert others. Efforts failed, refueling popular sentiments about the inferiority of Indians.

Relations between the Catawba and the settlers did not improve in the long term, despite the Catawba's decision to fight alongside the Patriots as their allies. After the Revolution, settler tenants who were renting land from the Catawba started insisting that they actually owned the land which they were only renting. Throughout the 1830s, the South Carolina legislature sent representatives to negotiate the sale of land. This constant pressure, combined with U.S. government removal policies, culminated in the spring of 1840 with the signing of the Treaty of Nation Ford. The treaty stipulated that the Catawba relinquish their 144,000 acres (580 km^{2}) of land to the state of South Carolina.

At this point the tribe was struggling to survive as a people. Some Catawba remained on their land, and a small number went to live with their neighbors, the Eastern Band Cherokee. They were not forced onto the Trail of Tears as their numbers were so small at this point, the government did not see it as worth the effort. They were terminated as a tribe by the federal government in 1959, and would not re-establish their enrollment and the process of regaining federal recognition until 1973, finally regaining Federal recognition in 1993.

== See also ==
- History of women in the United States
- Women in the military in the Americas
