= National Register of Historic Places listings in Brunswick County, North Carolina =

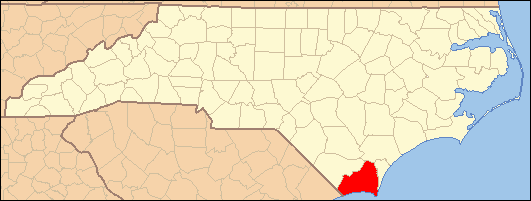

This list includes properties and districts listed on the National Register of Historic Places in Brunswick County, North Carolina. Click the "Map of all coordinates" link to the right to view an online map of all properties and districts with latitude and longitude coordinates in the table below.

== Current listings ==
This National Park Service list is complete through NPS recent listings posted May 1, 2026.

	Name on the Register	Image	Date listed	Location	City or town	Description
1	Bald Head Creek Boathouse	Bald Head Creek Boathouse	December 1, 1997 (#97001496)	Smith's Island at the mouth of the Cape Fear River; 33°51′41″N 77°59′11″W	Bald Head Island	Hurricane Florence destroyed the structure in September 2018
2	Bald Head Island Lighthouse	Bald Head Island Lighthouse	April 28, 1975 (#75001242)	South of Southport on Smith's Island at Bald Head; 33°52′24″N 78°00′03″W	Bald Head Island	Known as "Old Baldy"; oldest lighthouse in North Carolina
3	Brunswick County Courthouse	Brunswick County Courthouse	May 10, 1979 (#79001663)	Davis and Moore Sts. 33°55′08″N 78°01′05″W	Southport	
4	Brunswick Town Historic District	Brunswick Town Historic District	September 6, 1978 (#78001932)	North of Southport off North Carolina Highway 133; 34°02′27″N 77°56′41″W	Southport	
5	Cape Fear Civil War Shipwreck Discontiguous District		December 23, 1985 (#85003195)	Address Restricted	Holden Beach	
6	Cape Fear Lighthouse Complex	Cape Fear Lighthouse Complex	August 29, 1978 (#78001931)	Bald Head Island; 33°50′48″N 77°57′57″W	Bald Head Island	
7	Fort Caswell Historic District	Fort Caswell Historic District	December 31, 2013 (#13001025)	100 Caswell Beach Rd. 33°53′28″N 78°01′41″W	Caswell Beach	
8	Fort Johnston	Fort Johnston	June 7, 1974 (#74001327)	Moore St. 33°55′05″N 78°01′03″W	Southport	
9	Oak Island Life Saving Station	Oak Island Life Saving Station	December 28, 2000 (#00001553)	217 Caswell Beach Rd. 33°53′29″N 78°02′01″W	Caswell Beach	
10	Oak Island Lighthouse	Oak Island Lighthouse	April 5, 2007 (#07000293)	300A Caswell Beach Rd., north of North Carolina Highway 133; 33°53′33″N 78°02′07″W	Caswell Beach	
11	New Hope Presbyterian Church	New Hope Presbyterian Church	December 7, 2011 (#11000888)	800 Cherrytree Rd., NE. 34°08′09″N 78°07′09″W	Winnabow	
12	Orton Plantation	Orton Plantation	April 11, 1973 (#73001294)	On the Cape Fear River at the junction of NC 1530 and 1529; also 9149 Orton Rd. 34°03′31″N 77°56′44″W	Smithville Township	Second set of boundaries represents a boundary increase of September 20, 2013
13	Southport Historic District	Southport Historic District	November 25, 1980 (#80002801)	Roughly bounded by the Cape Fear River and Rhett, Bay, Short and Brown Sts. 33°55′09″N 78°01′13″W	Southport	
14	St. Philip's Church, Brunswick Town	St. Philip's Church, Brunswick Town	February 26, 1970 (#70000442)	South of Orton off SR 1533; 34°02′32″N 77°56′55″W	Brunswick Town	
15	John N. Smith Cemetery		August 9, 2021 (#100006808)	225 East Leonard St. 33°55′29″N 78°01′06″W	Southport	
16	T. B. McClintic		June 3, 1994 (#94000532)	Tripp's Marina; 33°54′53″N 78°22′33″W	Shallotte Point	
17	Winnabow		December 29, 2025 (#100012432)	677 Governor Road SE; 34°08′28″N 78°04′24″W	Winnabow vicinity	

== See also ==
- National Register of Historic Places listings in North Carolina
- List of National Historic Landmarks in North Carolina
- United States Coast Guard History and Heritage Sites
