= Brunswick Town Historic District =

Historic district in Brunswick County, North Carolina

- U.S. National Register of Historic Places
- U.S. Historic district
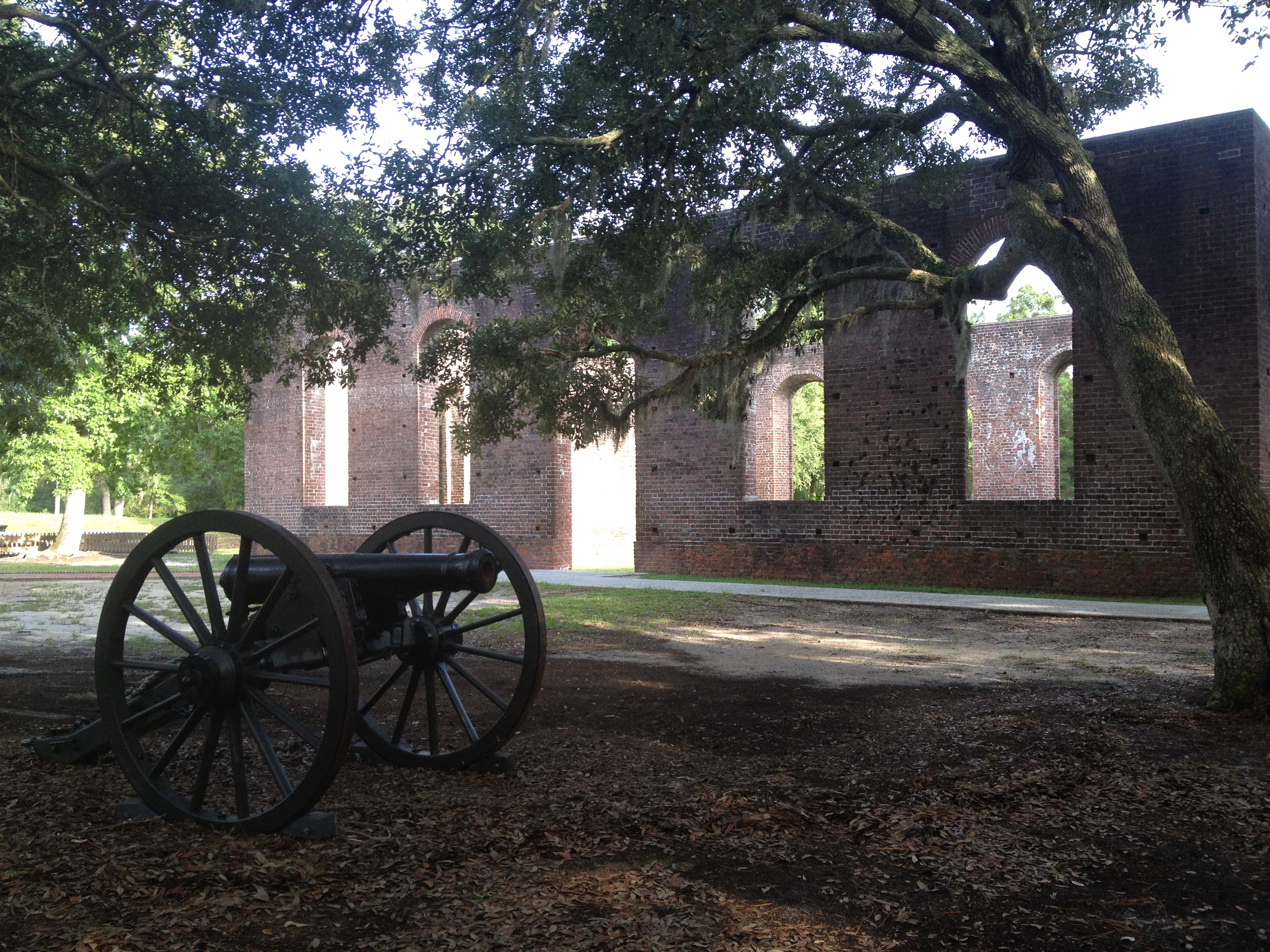
- St. Philip's Church Ruins, a part of the district

- Location within North Carolina
- Location: N of Southport off SR 133, near Southport, North Carolina
- Coordinates: 34°02′27″N 77°56′41″W
- Area: 225 acres (91 ha)
- NRHP reference No.: 78001932
- Added to NRHP: September 6, 1978

The Brunswick Town Historic District is the site of the ruins of Brunswick Town, Russellborough, and Fort Anderson located in North Carolina, United States.

== Description and administrative history ==
The 2,250-acre (910 ha) district is located in the Smithville Township of Brunswick County, between Wilmington and Southport. In September 1978, the Brunswick Town Historic District was added to the U.S. National Register of Historic Places.

== See also ==
- National Register of Historic Places listings in Brunswick County, North Carolina
