= St. Philip's Church (Brunswick Town, North Carolina) =

Historic church in North Carolina, United States

- St. Philip's Church Ruins
- U.S. National Register of Historic Places
- U.S. Historic district – Contributing property
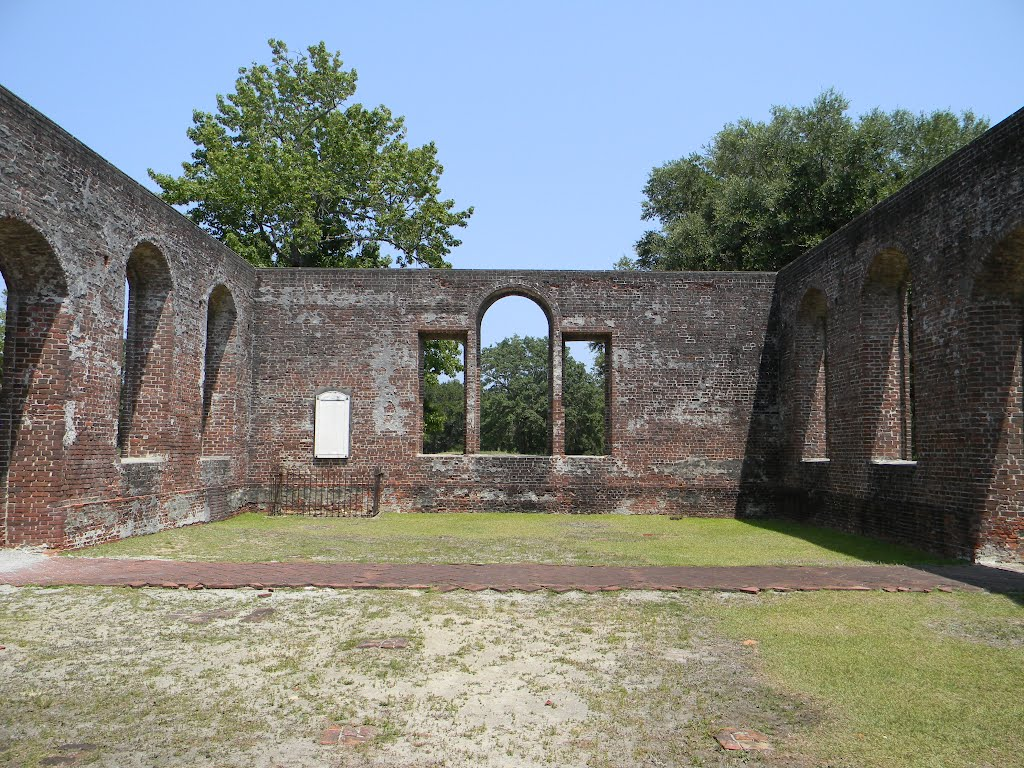
- St. Philip's Church ruins in Brunswick Town

- Location within North Carolina Location within the United States
- Location: Brunswick County, North Carolina
- Coordinates: 34°02′28.6″N 77°56′48.0″W
- Area: 8 acres (3.2 ha)
- Built: 1768
- Architectural style: Georgian
- Part of: Brunswick Town Historic District
- NRHP reference No.: 70000442
- Added to NRHP: February 26, 1970

St. Philip's Church, Brunswick Town, is a ruined parish church in Brunswick County, North Carolina, United States. The Anglican church was erected in 1768 and destroyed in 1776. The ruins are located beside the Cape Fear River in the Brunswick Town Historic District, along with Fort Anderson, Russelborough, and the nearby Orton Plantation. During the American Revolutionary War, British forces attacked Brunswick Town in 1776 and burned the church. Before its demise, the church was considered one of the finest religious structures in North Carolina. On February 26, 1970, the historic site was added to the National Register of Historic Places.

== History ==
In 1741, the St. Philip's Parish was created in Brunswick Town with Rev. James Moir as the first vicar. It was the sister church of St. James Church, Wilmington. Construction of St. Philip's Church began in 1754, but was not completed until 1768. The first minister to lead the new church was Rev. John Barnett and Governor Arthur Dobbs designated St. Philip's as "His Majesty’s Chapel in North Carolina." Barnett was succeeded by J. Cramp and Nicholas Christian. During the American Revolutionary War, British forces attacked Brunswick Town in 1776 and burned the church, Russelborough, and most of the settlement. The church walls were the only parts of the structure not to be destroyed. Brunswick Town was deserted and the church remains were relatively untouched for almost a century.

In March 1862, Confederate engineers began to survey the remains of Brunswick Town and St. Philip's Church. They built earthworks and trenches throughout the town, covering the remains of several burnt structures except for the church. The fort was constructed to protect the city of Wilmington 18 miles (29 km) upstream, a vital port during the Civil War. The bastion was named Fort St. Philip, but renamed Fort Anderson in July 1863. During the attack on Fort Anderson in February 1865, cannonballs shot from Union ships hit the walls of the church and are still evident today. Confederate soldiers killed in action (KIA) were initially placed inside the church. When the Confederate forces were defeated, Union soldiers desecrated several graves at St. Philip's Church and removed the building's cornerstone.

In 1899, the newly formed Cape Fear Chapter of the North Carolina Society of the Colonial Dames of America visited the historic site to pay homage to American Revolutionary War casualties in Brunswick Town. In 1902, Cape Fear Chapter erected a marble plaque inside St. Philip's to commemorate Brunswick Town co-founder, Maurice Moore. Excavations at Brunswick Town began in 1958 and items such as bullets, buttons, and a cannonball were retrieved from inside the ruins. The building is now part of the Brunswick Town State historic site. Visitors may walk through the church and tour the earthworks of nearby Fort Anderson.

== Architecture ==
The ruins consist of four brick walls, as well as graves located inside and outside of the church. The bricks used for construction were imported from England and the walls measure three feet (0.91 m) thick. The building is 76 feet, six inches (23.3 m) long, 53 feet, three inches (16.2 m) wide, and 24 feet, four inches (7.4 m) high. The floor and roof were destroyed in the fire, as well as the three doors and eleven windows that measured fifteen by seven feet (4.6 m x 2.1 m). The church floor was made of wood, except for the aisles which featured one-foot-square (0.3 m) brick tiles that formed the shape of a cross. The pews were wooden and the Governor's pew was raised above the others. Twelve burial sites are located inside the church and there are several graves remaining outside of the structure that were not desecrated by Union troops.

=== Notable burials ===
Notable people buried at St. Philip's Church include Arthur Dobbs, Governor Benjamin Smith, and Supreme Court Associate Justice Alfred Moore.

== See also ==
- History of North Carolina
- National Register of Historic Places listings in Brunswick County, North Carolina
- List of burial places of justices of the Supreme Court of the United States
