= The State Port Pilot =

Weekly newspaper from Southport, North Carolina, USA

- A Good Newspaper in a Good Community
- Type: Weekly newspaper
- Founder(s): Bill Keziah
- Publisher: Morgan Harper
- Editor: Morgan Harper
- Associate editor: Terry Pope
- Founded: 1928
- Headquarters: 114 E. Moore Street, Southport, NC
- Website: stateportpilot.com

The State Port Pilot is a weekly newspaper based in Southport, North Carolina. It was founded in 1928 by Bill Keziah and has been owned and operated by the Harper family since the Great Depression. It covers the towns of Southport, Oak Island, Caswell Beach, Boiling Spring Lakes, Bald Head Island, and St. James. It is published on Wednesdays.

== History ==
The Pilot had been founded in 1928 by Keziah, a hearing- and speech-impaired former editor of The News Reporter in Whiteville, whose talent as a reporter far exceeded his skill as a businessman. His new publication failed to meet its payment obligations to The News Reporter Inc., where the Pilot was printed then and continues to be printed until this day. The printing company took over the Pilot for non-payment, and hired Harper to be its editor. Among Harper's first decisions was the re-employment of the remarkable Keziah, this area's biggest promoter of fishing, tourism and the legendary Bouncing Log Spring. He continued with the Pilot until his death in the 1950s.

The young editor's greatest decision was his courtship of Margaret Taylor, who soon joined him in marriage and in the newspaper operation. During World War II, when her husband was serving in the U.S. Navy, Margaret Harper and Keziah ran the newspaper by themselves. During the 1950s and ’60s the Pilot was a three- or four-person operation — the editor, a reporter, always a secretary and sometimes an ad salesman.

In 1972, youngest son Ed joined the newspaper as editor, allowing James and Margaret Harper time to pursue other interests. James Harper continued with the newspaper as publisher until his death in 1994; Margaret Harper served in an advisory capacity until her death in 2009. Both James Harper and Ed Harper have served as president of the North Carolina Press Association. Margaret Harper served as secretary-treasurer of the association for a number of years, and is a member of the N.C. Journalism Hall of Fame. In 1972, the newspaper's circulation was 3,500 and a weekly edition usually consisted of 12 to 16 pages.

Today, a 70-page newspaper is the norm and circulation exceeds 10,000. The three-or-four-person staff has now grown to 15. The present 6,000-square-foot office on Moore Street dwarfs the white frame structure next door where the Pilot was located. Newspaper production has changed with the times.

The elder Harper used to drive 30 miles to Leland on Tuesdays to toss a package of news and ad material on a passing train to be picked up at the Whiteville depot. Harper told the story that he once missed the open box-car door, picked up the package from beside the tracks and followed the train to Whiteville. He then drove the 60 miles back to Southport and went back to work on Wednesday's edition.

Today, pages that are composed on computers are transmitted electronically to the printer in a matter of seconds. Over the past 18 years The State Port Pilot has earned more than 450 awards in annual North Carolina Press Association news and advertising competition, including 16 General Excellence awards.
