= Cape Fear Light =

Lighthouse in North Carolina, US

Cape Fear Lighthouse
- Location: North Carolina
- Coordinates: 33.846619°N 77.965884°W

Tower
- Constructed: 1903
- Construction: cast iron skeleton tower
- Height: 184 ft (56 m)
- Shape: Octagonal pyramidal skeleton
- Heritage: National Register of Historic Places listed place

Light
- First lit: 1903
- Deactivated: 1958
- Range: 19 miles
- Characteristic: flashing white every 10 seconds
- Cape Fear Lighthouse Complex
- U.S. National Register of Historic Places
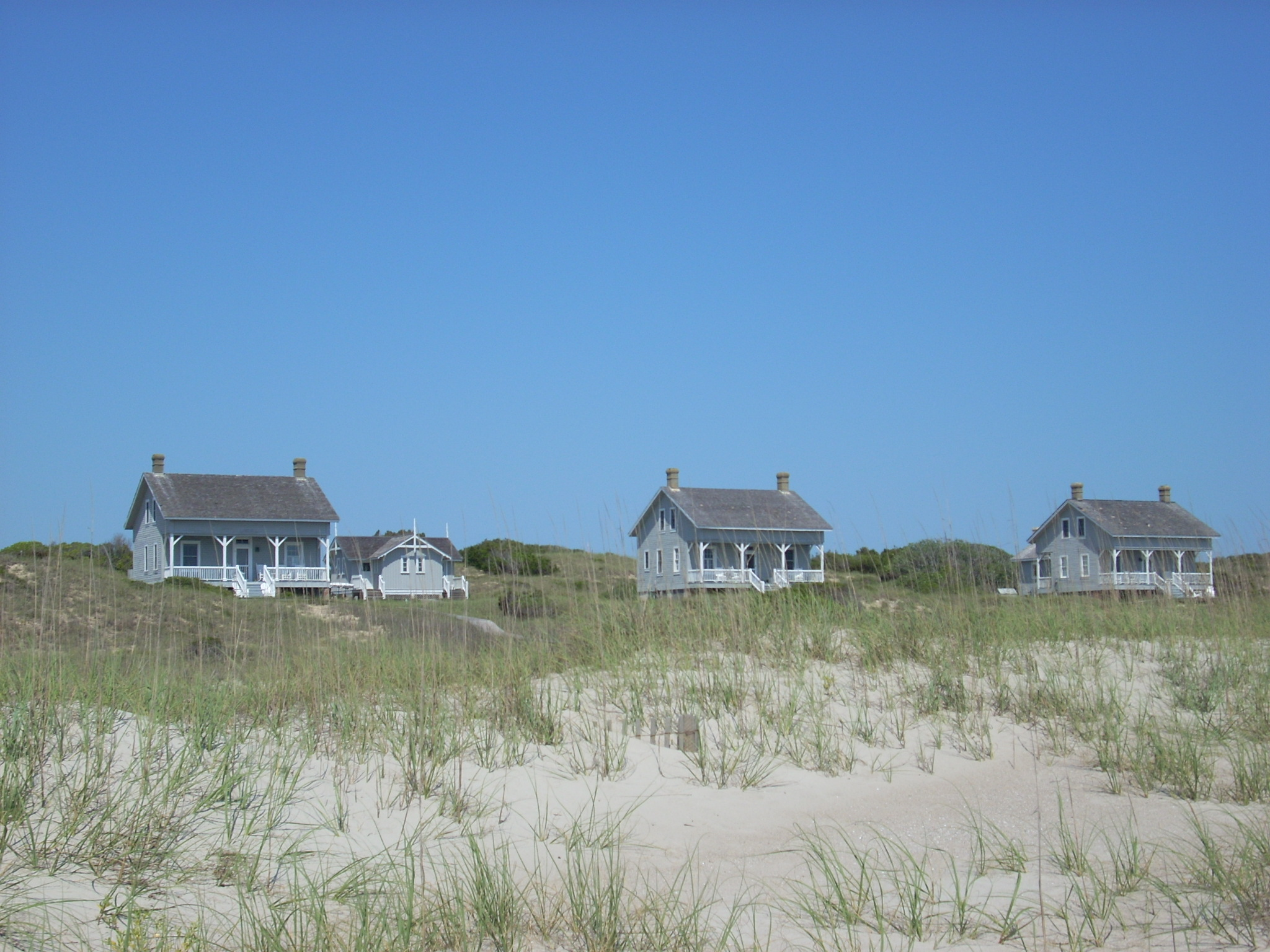
- Houses at the complex, known as Captain Charlie's Station, in 2007
- Nearest city: Bald Head Island, North Carolina
- Area: 2 acres (0.81 ha)
- Demolished: 1958
- NRHP reference No.: 78001931
- Added to NRHP: August 29, 1978

Cape Fear Lighthouse was a coastal beacon built in 1903, replacing the Bald Head Lighthouse as the main navigation aid for Cape Fear and the Frying Pan Shoals off the coast of the U.S. state of North Carolina. It stood near the cape on Bald Head Island. It was a steel octagonal pyramidal skeleton frame lighthouse, as opposed to the conical brick lighthouses usually associated with the state. It was painted red and white horizontal stripes: three white and two red and housed a first-order Fresnel lens produced by the Henry-LePaute Company in France.

In August 1906, the upper part of the tower above the columns was changed from white to black to provide a more conspicuous day beacon. In 1915, $35,000 was requested to disassemble and move the tower and dwellings to the site of Bald Head Lighthouse, as it was believed that shoreline erosion would soon endanger the structures. Apparently the erosion ceased because the funding request was not repeated and the keepers dwellings still stand today on their original location near the concrete foundation blocks that once supported the lighthouse.

The Cape Fear Light was maintained for more than half of its life by Capt. Charlie Swan, its lighthouse keeper. On December 5, 1932, first assistant lighthouse keeper, Devaney F. Jennette, died of a heart attack while in the watch room. He had just climbed the tower and was talking to Capt. Swan at the time. The Cape Fear Lighthouse was replaced in 1958 by the powerful Oak Island Lighthouse. The Cape Fear lighthouse was then demolished because it was believed that if the deactivated tower remained standing it could confuse mariners.

When the lighthouse was demolished the Coast Guard in an unusual move gave the first order Fresnel lens from the Cape Fear lighthouse to the demolition contractor. The intact lens ended up at an antique store in Wilmington where the prisms and glass panels were sold off piece by piece over the next 50 years. In 2009 what was left of the lens was acquired by the Old Baldy Foundation and returned to Bald Head island for restoration. Several of the glass prisms and panels from the lens that were sold off over the years have been returned to Bald Head Island. The Old Baldy Foundation plans to display the restored lens near the former site of the Cape Fear Lighthouse.

The Cape Fear Lighthouse Complex, also known as Cap'n Charlie's Cottages still stands, it consists of a row of three detached light keepers' houses and a supply shed and the piers of another shed. They were constructed in 1903, along with the lighthouse.

The complex was added to the National Register of Historic Places in 1978.
