= Brunswick Nuclear Generating Station =

Nuclear power plant in Brunswick County, North Carolina, US

Brunswick Nuclear Plant
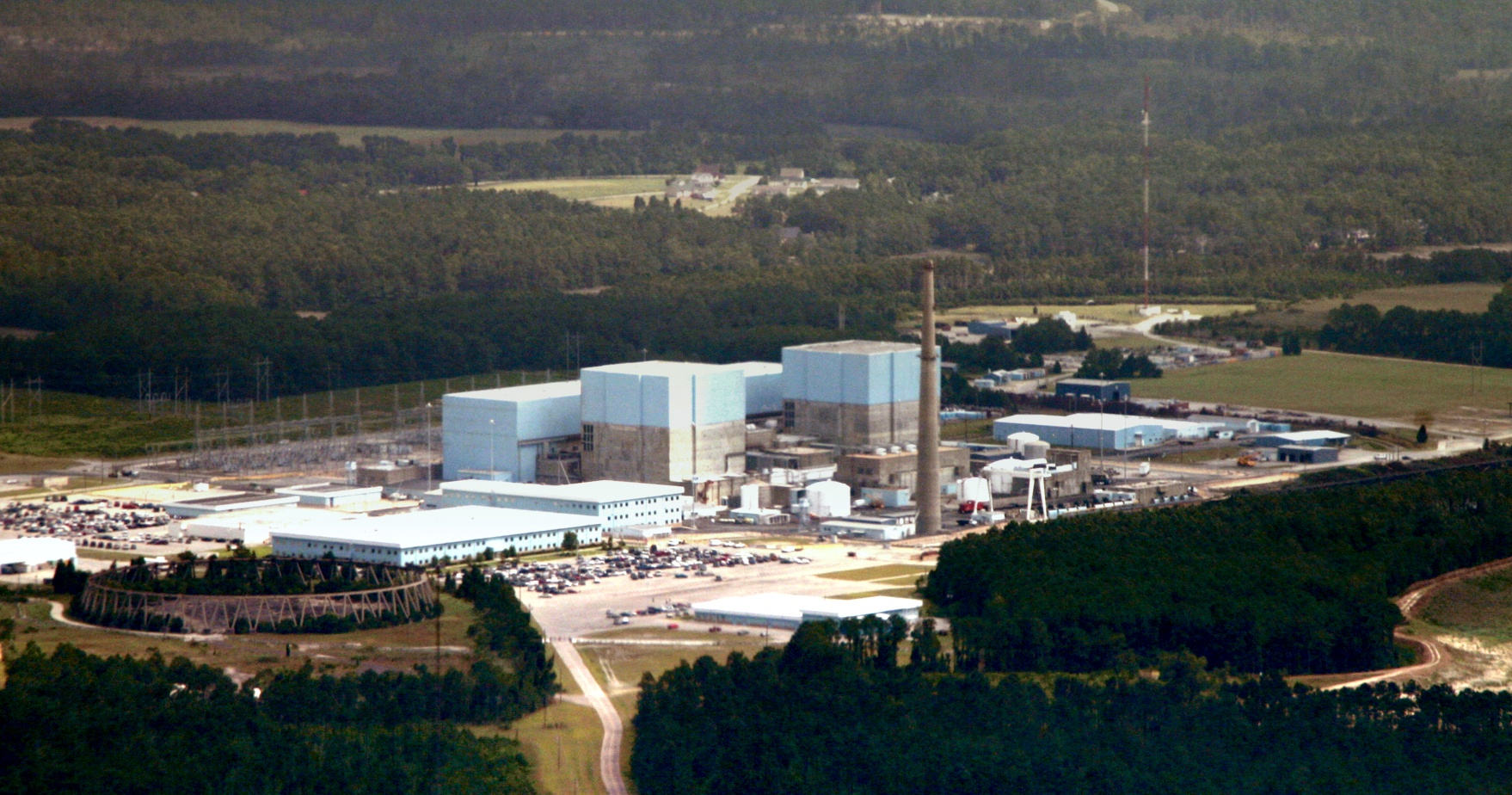
- Brunswick Plant
- Country: United States
- Location: Smithville Township, Brunswick County, North Carolina, near Southport, North Carolina
- Coordinates: 33°57′30″N 78°0′37″W
- Status: Operational
- Construction began: February 7, 1970
- Commission date: Unit 1: March 18, 1977; Unit 2: November 3, 1975
- Construction cost: $2.490 billion (2007 USD)
- Owner: Duke Energy
- Operator: Duke Energy

Nuclear power station
- Reactor type: BWR
- Reactor supplier: General Electric
- Cooling source: Cape Fear River
- Thermal capacity: 2 × 2923 MW_{th}

Power generation
- Units operational: 1 × 938 MW; 1 × 920 MW
- Make and model: BWR-4 (Mark 1)
- Nameplate capacity: 1858 MW
- Capacity factor: 94.43% (2017); 75.20% (lifetime)
- Annual net output: 15,468 GWh (2021)

External links
- Website: www.duke-energy.com/energy-education/energy-centers-and-programs/brunswick-ed-center
- Commons: Related media on Commons

The Brunswick nuclear power plant, named for Brunswick County, North Carolina, covers 1,200 acres (490 ha) at 20 feet (6.1 m) above sea level about 5 miles (8.0 km) from the Atlantic Ocean. The site is adjacent to the town of Southport, North Carolina, and to wetlands and woodlands, and was opened in 1975.

The site contains two General Electric boiling water reactors, which are cooled by water collected from the Cape Fear River and discharged into the Atlantic Ocean.

Duke Energy Progress is the owner and operator of the Brunswick nuclear plant. The North Carolina Eastern Municipal Power Agency formerly owned an 18.3% stake in the plant; their share was purchased by Duke Energy in 2015. (Duke Energy completed its merger with Progress Energy on July 2, 2012.)

The Brunswick plant's original design called for two cooling towers, and construction of the foundations for both towers was started. However, the proximity to the Cape Fear River and the Atlantic Ocean allowed the designers to take in cooling water from the Cape Fear river and discharge it into the Atlantic off the coast of Oak Island. Fish, crustaceans, and other debris are removed from the cooling water via a filtration system. The water then flows through the nuclear plant and discharges into a five mile long canal which passes under the Intra-Coastal Waterway at one point. The concrete foundation of one unfinished cooling tower is now a parking lot for employees at the plant.

== Electricity production ==
Generation (MWh) of Brunswick Nuclear Generating Station
Year	Jan	Feb	Mar	Apr	May	Jun	Jul	Aug	Sep	Oct	Nov	Dec	Annual (Total)
2001	1,224,090	1,013,268	679,965	1,207,360	1,221,814	1,179,324	1,230,269	1,221,874	1,180,537	1,245,951	1,202,033	1,237,062	13,843,547
2002	1,233,726	1,086,938	636,064	1,009,624	1,227,994	1,212,571	1,268,407	1,265,737	1,032,812	1,272,031	1,246,292	1,285,249	13,777,445
2003	1,246,933	1,149,561	795,256	1,147,713	1,341,718	1,276,883	1,263,844	1,330,636	1,287,825	1,360,809	1,191,314	1,337,028	14,729,520
2004	1,316,899	1,171,955	681,725	1,202,507	1,322,881	1,292,779	1,297,160	1,177,650	1,330,833	1,365,456	1,332,512	1,357,303	14,849,660
2005	1,360,572	1,147,836	777,815	795,196	1,399,227	1,337,338	1,223,158	1,066,070	1,361,501	1,379,973	1,353,048	1,335,014	14,536,748
2006	1,423,237	1,275,351	738,447	1,177,242	1,160,057	1,325,560	1,410,111	1,075,517	1,319,978	1,419,852	938,192	1,278,545	14,542,089
2007	1,415,551	1,290,528	756,316	804,644	1,409,524	1,356,863	1,408,250	1,387,623	990,878	1,417,385	1,374,356	1,410,245	15,022,163
2008	1,418,983	1,312,323	924,848	683,588	1,402,328	1,348,721	1,398,742	1,361,221	1,255,357	1,416,796	944,711	1,417,252	14,884,870
2009	1,415,638	1,234,975	700,536	700,432	1,317,304	1,290,999	1,391,397	1,366,066	894,822	1,337,078	1,364,759	1,415,801	14,429,807
2010	1,383,359	1,076,816	695,926	722,133	1,284,951	1,343,826	1,388,888	1,390,611	1,341,977	1,404,236	1,375,796	1,399,969	14,808,488
2011	1,427,064	1,271,800	795,935	904,534	1,296,846	1,328,592	1,383,727	1,363,929	1,311,936	1,394,296	765,974	1,320,427	14,565,060
2012	1,414,106	1,090,610	698,940	675,003	1,332,657	1,284,773	1,391,780	1,377,275	1,052,185	1,396,690	1,213,942	1,375,114	14,303,075
2013	1,408,972	1,219,629	749,575	691,867	870,832	1,354,633	1,387,564	1,298,135	1,350,268	1,402,335	1,360,704	1,361,254	14,455,768
2014	1,413,134	1,198,964	695,259	1,032,496	1,399,368	1,339,640	1,390,415	1,384,179	1,329,286	1,386,584	1,367,847	1,395,068	15,332,240
2015	1,405,493	1,070,545	713,523	1,224,740	1,394,989	1,329,113	1,390,282	1,385,984	1,339,828	1,407,334	1,232,904	1,393,847	15,288,582
2016	1,368,449	1,004,480	804,947	1,330,114	1,392,806	1,343,781	1,382,543	1,377,432	1,337,730	1,343,847	1,318,096	1,384,522	15,388,747
2017	1,391,630	1,204,675	986,692	847,297	1,376,440	1,326,446	1,383,526	1,376,905	1,336,508	1,395,042	1,358,237	1,386,757	15,370,155
2018	1,346,874	1,120,259	727,984	1,181,261	1,399,406	1,133,808	1,316,720	1,387,369	906,920	1,383,271	1,368,000	1,355,095	14,626,967
2019	1,361,320	1,249,075	653,858	595,650	1,404,967	1,314,015	1,397,585	1,396,042	1,161,163	1,406,580	1,363,766	1,412,735	14,716,756
2020	1,413,655	1,286,568	744,316	1,314,288	1,405,566	1,081,931	1,386,794	942,005	1,294,342	1,369,228	1,355,359	1,412,168	15,006,220
2021	1,404,732	1,253,531	815,304	1,246,906	1,107,340	1,348,094	1,397,354	1,386,221	1,348,649	1,414,835	1,375,125	1,370,769	15,468,860
2022	1,325,054	1,054,029	779,395	1,181,343	1,401,994	1,350,736	1,400,324	1,396,545	1,347,791	1,413,358	1,336,715	1,399,821	15,387,105
2023	1,385,111	786,161	1,148,366	1,268,134	1,411,322	1,356,153	1,394,239	1,395,389	1,338,084	1,403,717	1,354,505	1,416,895	15,658,076
2024	1,422,100	902,886	1,077,404	1,378,376	1,413,178	1,346,963	1,402,684	1,409,272	1,362,969	1,095,349	1,385,218	1,429,151	15,625,550
2025	1,383,237	1,171,272	741,873	1,363,136	1,407,070	1,341,506	1,381,998	1,390,315	1,339,725	1,410,109	1,369,763	1,410,691	15,710,695
2026	1,420,066	1,166,765	703,460	959,252	1,410,591	1,349,681	1,391,928	1,389,400					--

== Surrounding population ==
The Nuclear Regulatory Commission defines two emergency planning zones around nuclear power plants: a plume exposure pathway zone with a radius of 10 miles (16 km), concerned primarily with exposure to, and inhalation of, airborne radioactive contamination, and an ingestion pathway zone of about 50 miles (80 km), concerned primarily with ingestion of food and liquid contaminated by radioactivity.

The 2010 U.S. population within 10 miles (16 km) of Brunswick was 36,413, an increase of 105.3 percent in a decade, according to an analysis of U.S. Census data for msnbc.com. The 2010 U.S. population within 50 miles (80 km) was 468,953, an increase of 39.6 percent since 2000. Cities within 50 miles include Wilmington (18 miles to city center).

== Seismic risk ==
The Nuclear Regulatory Commission's estimate of the risk each year of an earthquake intense enough to cause core damage to the reactor at Brunswick was 1 in 66,667, according to an NRC study published in August 2010.

== Hurricane Florence ==
The two reactors at Brunswick were shut down on Thursday, September 13, 2018, prior to tropical storm-force winds from Hurricane Florence impacting the plant. Of the nine nuclear power plants in the path of Hurricane Florence, Brunswick was the only nuclear power plant shutdown.

== Brunswick Energy & Education Center ==
In 2023, Duke Energy inaugurated the Brunswick Energy & Education Center located at the Brunswick Nuclear Plant. The Education Center is located at 8520 River Road SE, Southport, and "features exhibits on nuclear science, electricity, carbon-free energy and the operation of the Brunswick Nuclear Plant".

The education center offers opportunities for scheduled visitors to learn about nuclear power plants, fuel and nuclear operations in general through demonstrations, movies and career discussions etc.

The Education Center at Brunswick is Duke Energy’s fourth Energy Education Center, with the other three located in Huntersville, New Hill and Seneca, S.C.
