= Bald Head Island Conservancy =

Coordinates: 33.8463°N 77.9658°W

- Abbreviation: BHIC
- Formation: November 7, 1983
- Type: Nonprofit
- Tax ID no.: 58-1574496
- Legal status: 501(c)(3)
- Headquarters: Bald Head Island, North Carolina
- Board President: John Cathcart
- Executive Director: G. Christopher Shank
- Website: https://bhic.org

The Bald Head Island Conservancy (BHIC) is a non-profit organization involved in barrier island conservation, preservation and education. It is located in the Smith Island Complex in Brunswick County, North Carolina, which includes Bald Head Island. It runs the Barrier Island Study Center, which was the first community-based barrier island research and education facility in the US.
