= Bald Head Creek Boathouse =

- U.S. National Register of Historic Places
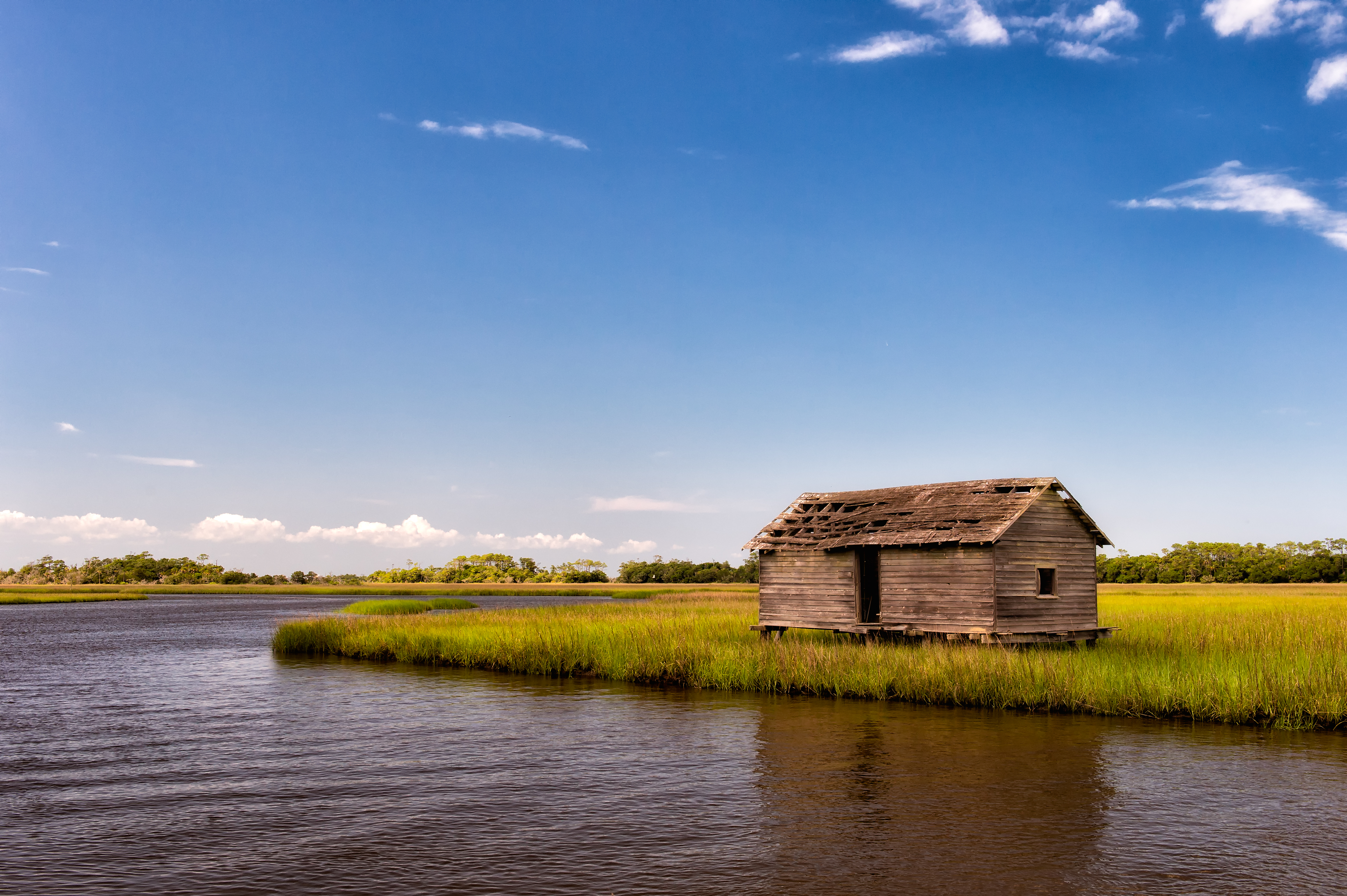
- Bald Head Creek Boathouse, June 2013

- Location within North Carolina Location within the United States
- Location: Smith Island, mouth of Cape Fear River, Smith's Island, North Carolina
- Coordinates: 33°51′41″N 77°59′11″W
- Area: less than one acre
- Built: c. 1915
- Built by: US Lighthouse Service
- Architectural style: frame boathouse
- NRHP reference No.: 97001496
- Added to NRHP: December 1, 1997

Bald Head Creek Boathouse is a historic boathouse located at the mouth of the Cape Fear River at Smith's Island, Brunswick County, North Carolina. It was built in 1915 by the United States Lighthouse Service. It is a one-story, side-gabled weathered frame structure. It sits among salt marshes on wooden pilings.

It was added to the National Register of Historic Places in 1997.

Hurricane Florence destroyed the structure in September 2018. All that remains are the timbers spread across the pilings. This is view-able on Google Maps right across from Boathouse Tract Rd.
