= Dosher Memorial Hospital =

Coordinates: 33.9294972°N 78.0217908°W

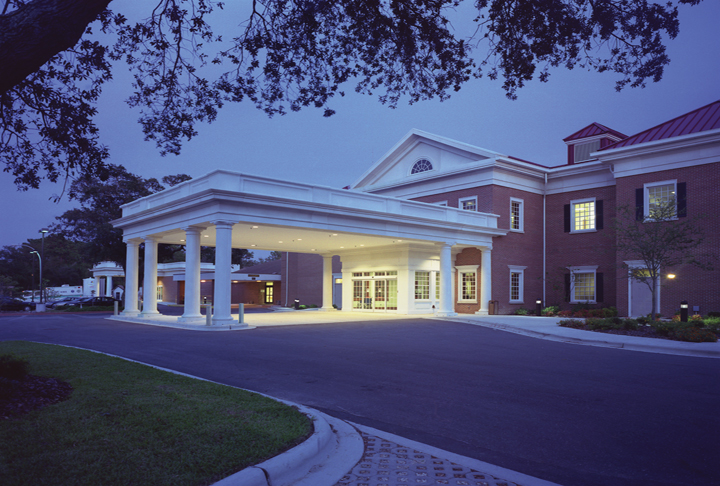
Dosher Memorial Hospital main entrance

Dosher Memorial Hospital is a not-for-profit, public, community hospital in Southport, North Carolina. The hospital serves Smithville Township—Southport, Bald Head Island, Caswell Beach, Oak Island, and the eastern portion of St. James—and surrounding communities of Brunswick County, North Carolina. Opened on June 2, 1930 as Brunswick County Hospital, the hospital changed its name in 1939 to J. Arthur Dosher Memorial Hospital in memory of founding physician and first general surgeon, Julius Arthur Dosher, MD.

Established as a critical access hospital under Article 2 of the NC General Statue § 131-4, Dosher Memorial Hospital is overseen by a publicly elected Board of Trustees. It is the only independent critical access hospital in North Carolina. Dosher is licensed for 25 acute care beds, and focuses on outpatient surgeries and procedures. The hospital is accredited by DNV-GL Healthcare. It also owns and operates nine primary care, women's health and urgent care clinics across southern Brunswick County.
