= Cape Fear (headland) =

Landform on the coast of North Carolina

Coordinates: 33°50′26″N 77°57′37″W

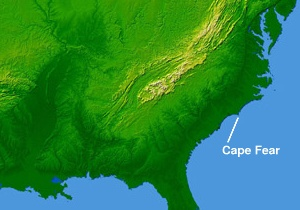
Cape Fear, on the coast of North Carolina

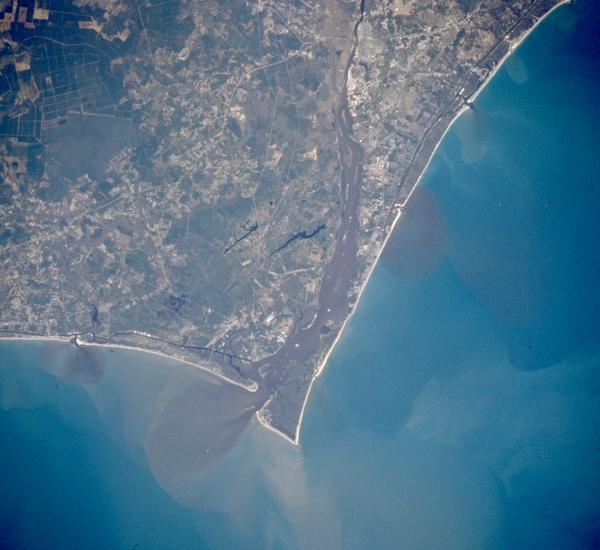
Cape Fear in a NASA satellite photo, showing the estuary of the Cape Fear River

Cape Fear is a prominent headland jutting into the Atlantic Ocean from Bald Head Island on the coast of North Carolina in the Southeastern United States. It is largely formed of barrier beaches and the silty outwash of the Cape Fear River as it drains the southeast coast of North Carolina through an estuary south of Wilmington. Cape Fear is formed by the intersection of two sweeping arcs of shifting, low-lying beach, the result of longshore currents which also form the treacherous, shifting Frying Pan Shoals, part of the Graveyard of the Atlantic.

Dunes dominated by sea oats occur from the upper beach drift line back to the stable secondary dunes, where they mix with other grasses such as saltmeadow cordgrass and panic grass, as well as seaside goldenrod, spurge and other herbs to form a stable salt-tolerant grassland.

The Cape Fear estuary drains the largest watershed in North Carolina, containing 27% of the state's population.

Cape Fear acts as a breakpoint for tropical cyclone warnings and watches issued by the National Hurricane Center.

== Local ocean geography ==
Off the coast of the Headland exist numerous underwater slide complexes, with the most notable and aptly named being the Cape Fear Slide Complex, which is one of the most studied in the United States. Scientists discovered evidence of at least five major slide events happening near Cape Fear over the span of 30,000 years. Evidence from the same study also indicates that the Cape Fear Slide Complex could have caused several tsunamis, with estimates of two-meter waves being produced out near the complex itself, although there is a lack of research to find out if these waves eventually reached the Cape Fear Headland.

Scientists have long theorized about the causes of the submarine slides at the Cape Fear Slide Complex. Initial theories pointed towards gas hydrate deposits and salt tectonics, although those are largely no longer considered the foremost factors. Recent research points towards a steep Paleogene upper slope being a possible key factor in these failures; phenomena such as rapid sediment accumulation, salt drawdowns below the upper slope, and resulting excess pore pressure are now thought of as catalysts for the submarine slides, and all are caused by the formation of the upper slope.

== Environmental issues ==
The Cape Fear Watershed has a long and contentious history with the subject of PFAS. Many studies have concluded that dozens of areas throughout the watershed have been contaminated with these forever chemicals. Reports have been filed across beaches throughout the Cape Fear Headland that are near the mouth of the river. PFAS are known to be transferred upward through consumption, often ending up in human bloodstreams through the consumption of fish exposed to contaminated waters; reports have surfaced throughout the years of North Carolina residents containing PFAS within their bloodstream. These cases of exposure have resulted in numerous fines and lawsuits against companies that manufacture these forever chemicals along the Cape Fear River.

== History ==
Giovanni da Verrazzano, the Italian explorer sailing for France, made landfall after crossing the Atlantic at or near Cape Fear on March 1, 1524.

The name comes from the 1585 expedition of Sir Richard Grenville. Sailing to Roanoke Island, his ship became embayed behind the cape. Some of the crew were afraid they would wreck, giving rise to the name Cape Fear. It is the fifth-oldest surviving English place name in the U.S.

Cape Fear was the landing place of British General Sir Henry Clinton during the American Revolutionary War on May 3, 1775.

The 1962 film Cape Fear, its 1991 remake, and the 2026 Cape Fear TV Series were set at Cape Fear.

== See also ==
- Geography of North Carolina

Preceded by Bald Head Island	Beaches of Southeastern North Carolina	Succeeded by Fort Caswell
