= New Hope Presbyterian Church =

Historic church in North Carolina, United States

- U.S. National Register of Historic Places
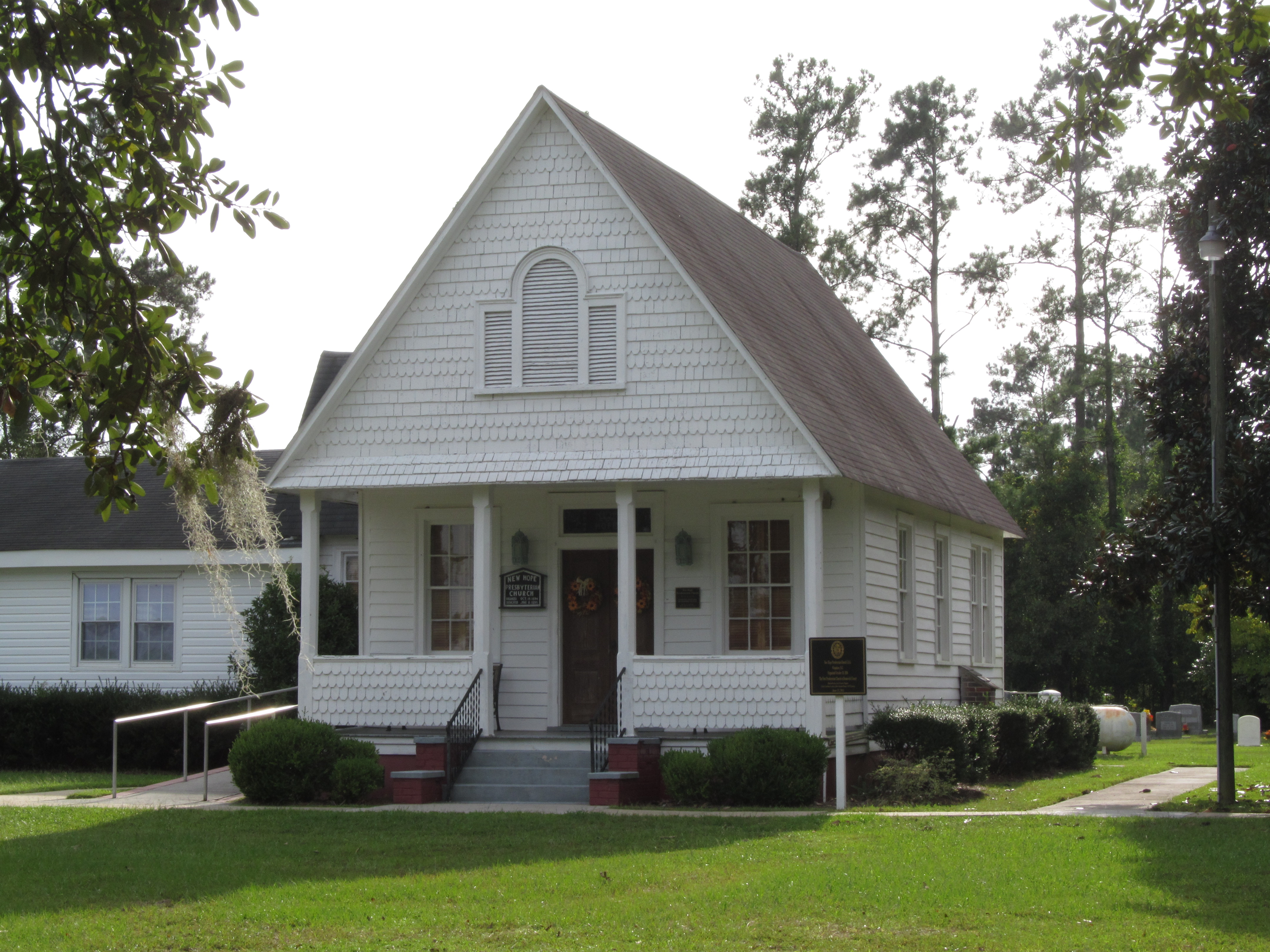

- Location within North Carolina Location within the United States
- Location: 800 Cherrytree Rd., NE, near Winnabow, North Carolina
- Coordinates: 34°08′09″N 78°07′09″W
- Area: 3 acres (1.2 ha)
- Built: 1895, ca. 1941, 1955, 1963
- Built by: Lewis, Cleve
- Architectural style: Gothic Revival, Queen Anne
- NRHP reference No.: 11000888
- Added to NRHP: December 7, 2011

New Hope Presbyterian Church is a historic church located near Winnabow, Brunswick County, North Carolina, United States. It was built in 1895, and is a one-story, frame church building with a Queen Anne style exterior and Gothic Revival interior. It features a steeply pitched, gable-front roof and rests on a brick pier foundation. A fellowship hall was added about 1941. Also on the property is a contributing church cemetery.

It was added to the National Register of Historic Places in 2011.
