= Smithville Township, Brunswick County, North Carolina =

Township in Brunswick County, North Carolina, U.S.

Coordinates: 33.9291207°N 78.0719168°W

Smithville Township is one of six townships within Brunswick County, North Carolina, United States. As of the 2000 Census, Smithville Township had a population of 12,019 and a population density of 152 inhabitants per square mile (59/km^{2}). It is a part of the Wilmington, NC Metropolitan Statistical Area.

Smithville Township, occupying 79 sq mi (200 km^{2}) of land and 120.3 sq mi (312 km^{2}) of water, is located on the Atlantic Ocean coast and encompasses the towns of Oak Island, Southport, Caswell Beach, and Bald Head Island. It is the site of the Brunswick Nuclear Generating Station.

== See also ==
- Brunswick Town
- Orton Plantation
