= Brunswick Town, North Carolina =

Former settlement in North Carolina, United States

Coordinates: 34.039823°N 77.946582°W

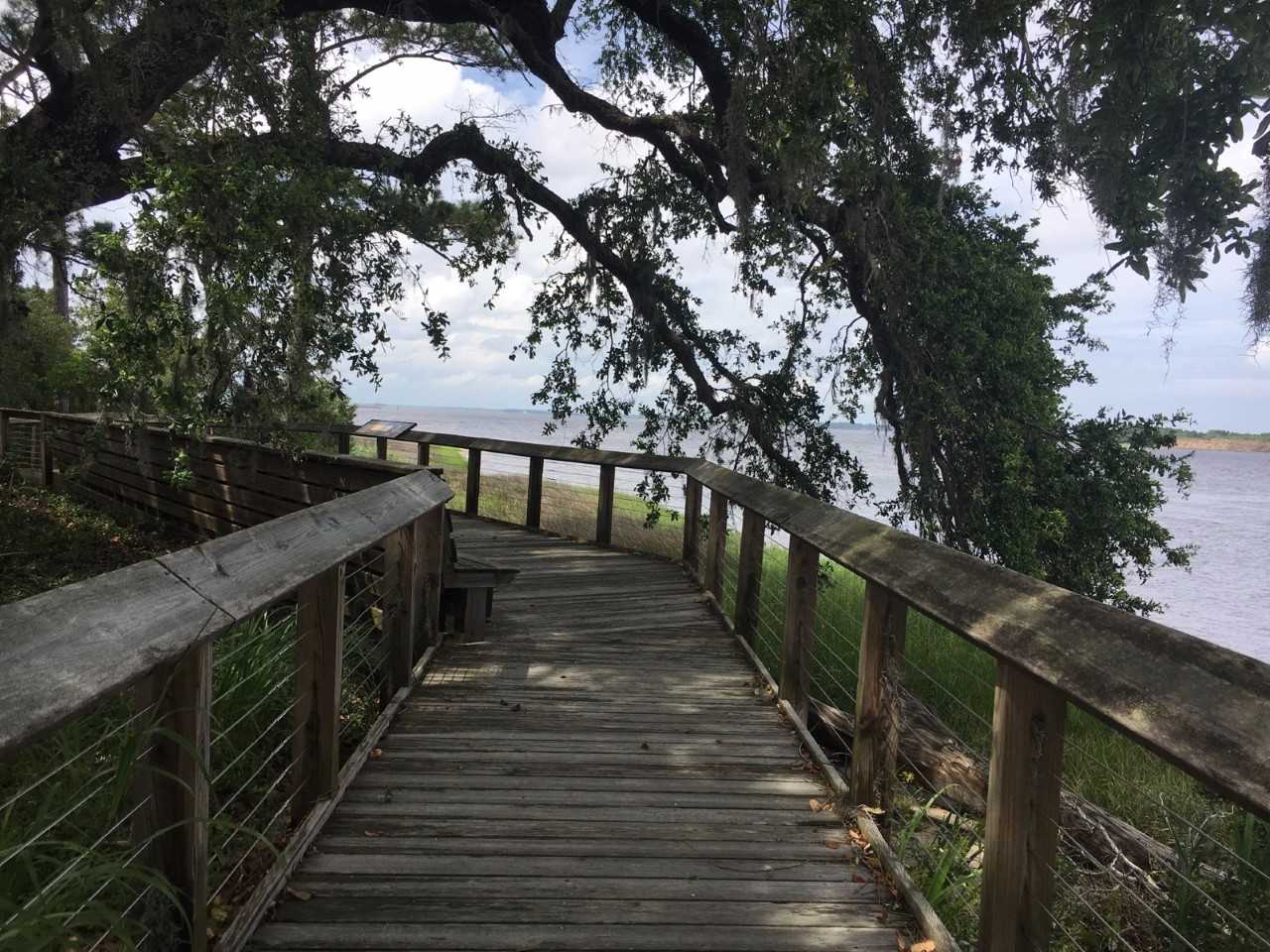
Boardwalk overlooking the Cape Fear River

Brunswick Town was a prominent town in colonial North Carolina. It was the first successful European settlement in the Cape Fear region, a major colonial port in the 18th century, and home to two provincial governors. Brunswick Town existed for 50 years until it was burnt in a 1776 raid by British forces during the American Revolutionary War and never rebuilt. During the American Civil War, 86 years after the town was abandoned, a large portion of the town was covered by earthworks for the construction of Fort Anderson.

Brunswick Town became an excavation site for Cape Fear history during the 20th century. The Brunswick Town Historic District contains the ruins of 18th-century commercial and residential colonial homes, St Philip's Church, Fort Anderson, and Russellborough, the former governor's mansion. The town's historic district and St. Philip's Church are listed on the National Register of Historic Places.

== Establishment ==
In the decades prior to the establishment of Brunswick Town, the surrounding area was inhabited by the Cape Fear Native Americans, who allied with the Carolina colonists against the inland Tuscarorans in the Tuscarora War (1711–15) but subsequently fought against the colonists in the Yamasee War (1715–1717). In 1725, the Lord Proprietors granted Colonel Maurice Moore 1,500 acres of land where he established Brunswick Town in June 1726. The first lot was sold to Cornelius Harnett Sr.

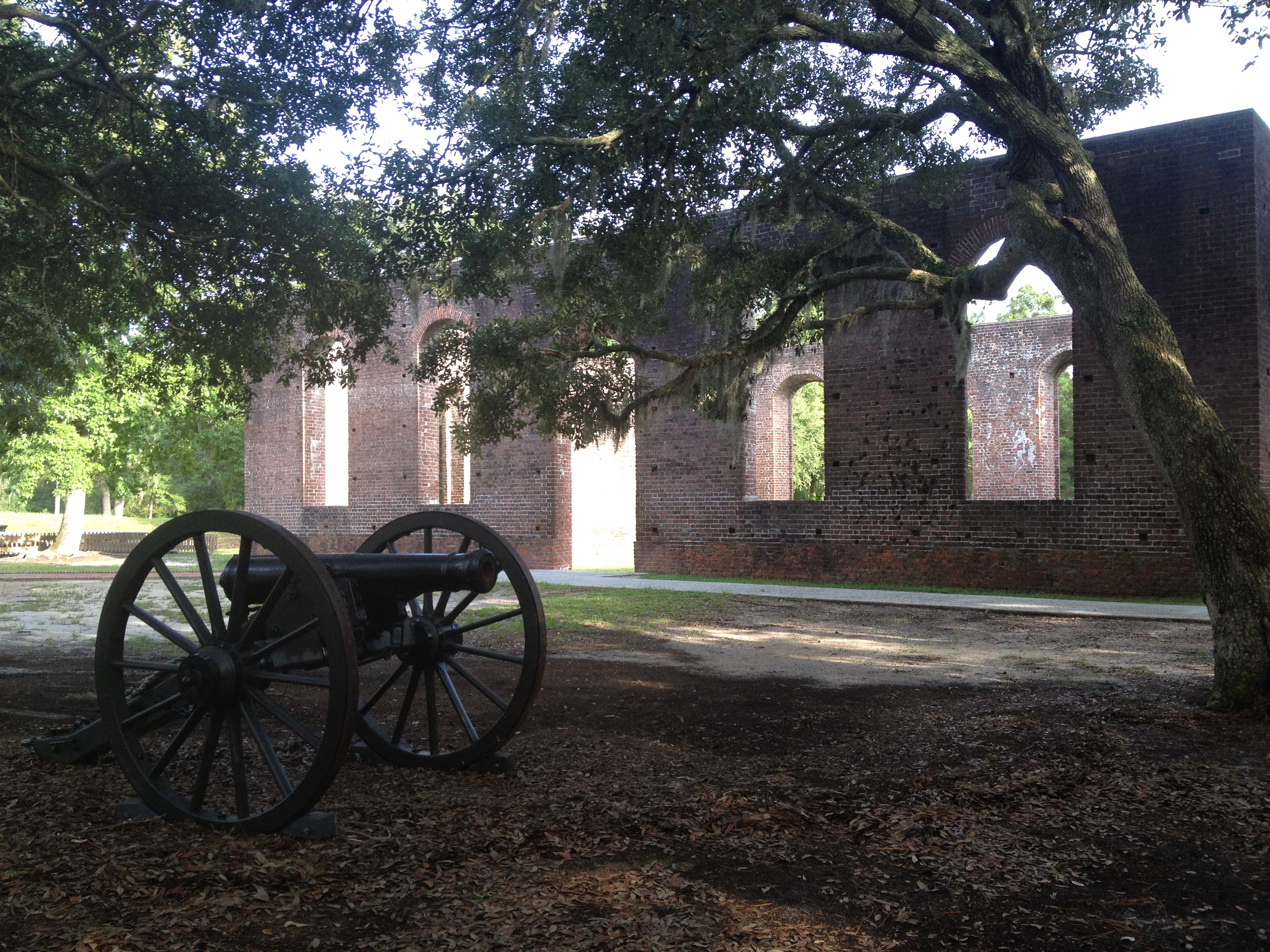
St. Philip's Church Ruins

Colonel Maurice Moore was the son of Carolina Governor James Moore. Colonel Moore was the father of General James Moore and Judge Maurice Moore. Judge Maurice Moore was the father of Supreme Court Associate Justice Alfred Moore. The town was named after Brunswick-Lüneburg, the German territory ruled by Great Britain's reigning King George I. Colonel Maurice Moore had seven brothers and four sisters. One of his brothers, Roger Moore built Orton Plantation using some of the land that was granted to Colonel Maurice. Most of the Moore family moved to Brunswick Town following Maurice and Roger. The Moores became known as "The Family".

During the next few months, Brunswick Town grew rapidly and became a busy port for exporting longleaf pine products such as tar, pitch, and turpentine used for the Royal Navy and merchant ships. During the 1730s, Brunswick Town became the political center of the Cape Fear region and seat of New Hanover County. Brunswick Town was crucial to Wilmington because the Cape Fear river was too shallow near the mouth of Town Creek for large vessels to pass through. The town was the third capital city of the Province of North Carolina, from 1743 to 1770 (although this title simply referred to the town where the current governor resided rather than any official designation).

== Spanish attack ==
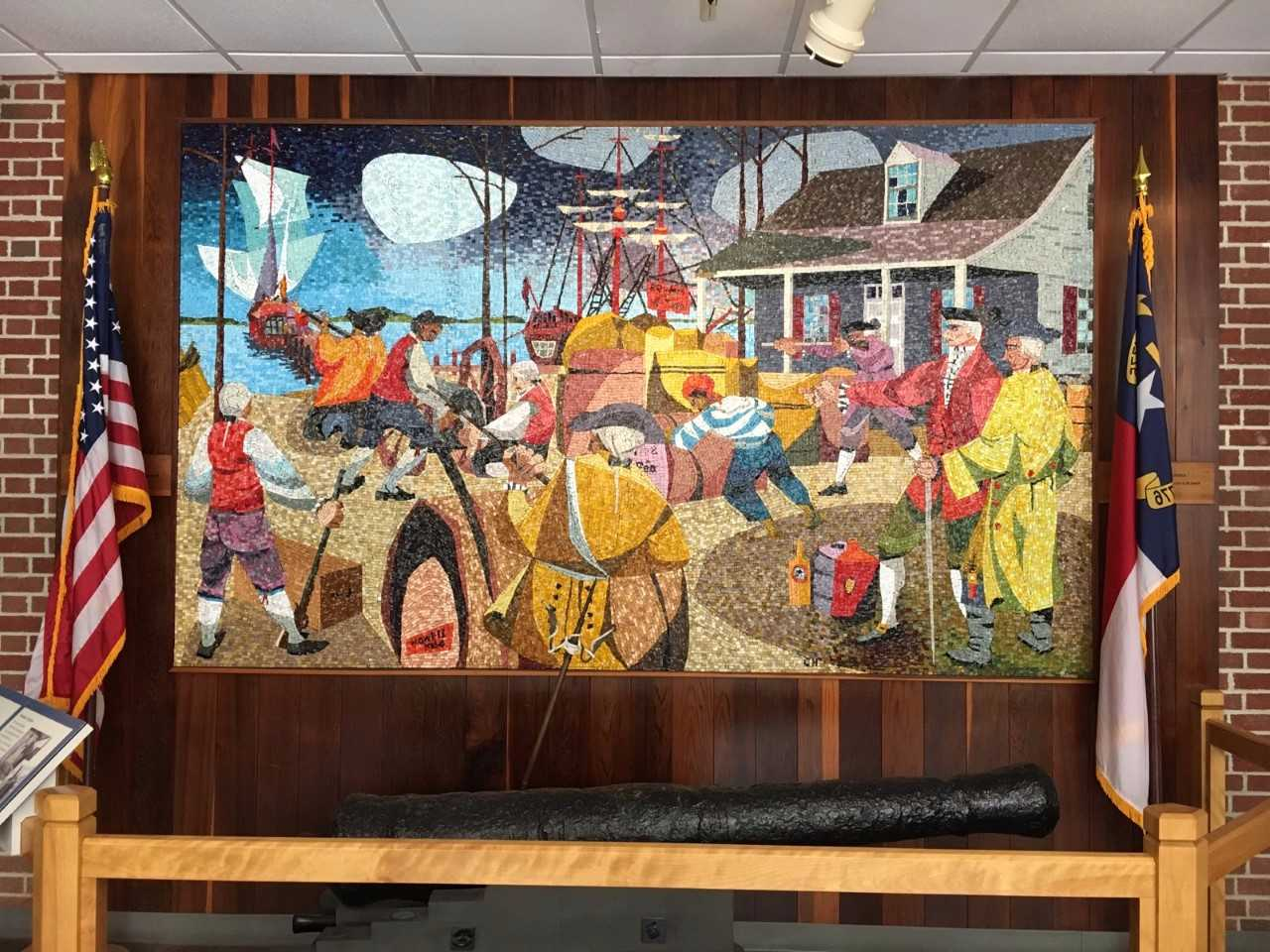
Mosaic depicting the Spanish attack

Over the next few decades the Port of Brunswick became the busiest port district in North Carolina, and shipped goods to Europe and the British West Indies. England was at war with Spain and France on and off. Cape Fear was a perfect place for their enemies to attack. During September 3–6, 1748, Brunswick Town was attacked by Spanish privateers. Two ships, La Fortuna and La Loretta anchored off the Town. Terrified, the townspeople fled into neighboring woods. On September 4, 1748, the Spanish began raiding the town for slaves and anything else they could find that was valuable. Since the townspeople had left everything behind, the Spanish were able to raid the abandoned ships and houses without resistance.

On September 5 Captain William Dry III rallied a group of around 67 men who were armed with muskets and pistols to take back the town. William Dry III with the help of William Moore, Schenk Moore, Edward Wingate, Cornelius Harnett Jr., and William Lord started the counterattack on September 6. Among the men was also a slave who was volunteered by George Ronalds. The Spanish fled from the town. Ten of the privateers were killed and thirty were captured. During the retreat, the La Fortuna exploded killing most of the men on board. The second ship, La Loretta, surrendered on the condition that they would be able to leave. During the counterattack, only one person defending the town lost his life. The slave that was volunteered by George Ronalds lost his life when a small cannon exploded.

The abandoned ship, La Fortuna, was still in the river when the remainder of the privateers had been thrown out of the town. William Dry III hired sailors to search the La Fortuna for anything valuable. The sailors were able to bring ashore guns, anchors, and items stolen from the town. Among the items confiscated from the ship was a painting depicting the Ecce Homo. The painting was given to St. James Church, Wilmington by the North Carolina General Assembly and remains there today. The town was able to sell the Spanish slaves and goods from the abandoned ship. The funds that were obtained from the sales were used to build St. Philip's Church, Brunswick Town and St. James Church, Wilmington.

== Russellborough ==
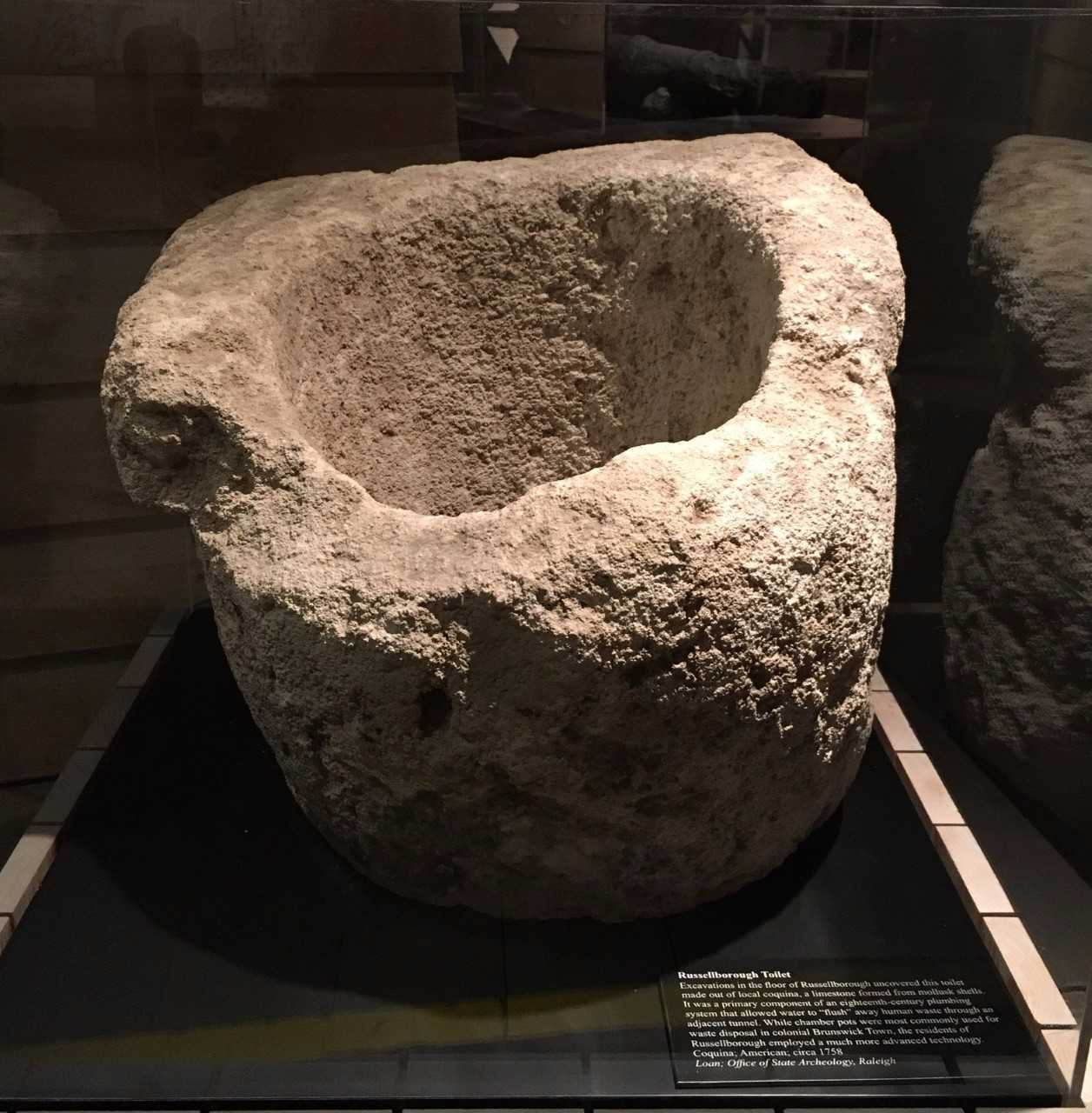
Russellborough toilet (circa 1758)

Russellborough was first owned by Captain John Russell of his majesty's sloop, Scorpion. However, the grand two-story house and plantation was not completed at the time Royal Governor Arthur Dobbs purchased the land in 1758. Governor Dobbs made a few changes to the house and finished it. He called it "Castle Dobbs". After Governor Dobbs death in 1765, William Tryon was sworn in as Governor, Province of North Carolina. Governor Tryon moved into what he called "Castle Tryon" in 1765. After Governor Tryon's house in New Bern, North Carolina was completed he moved his family into what is known as Tryon Palace. Governor Tryon sold his Brunswick Town plantation to William Dry III who renamed the plantation Bellfont. In 1776, the plantation was burnt by British forces.

When the construction of Fort Anderson was being completed, Russellborough was untouched. Today the excavated ruins can be seen at Brunswick Town/Fort Anderson North Carolina State Historic Site. Artifacts from Russellborough can also be viewed in the exhibit hall located in the visitor center.

== Stamp Act resistance ==
On November 1, 1765, the British Parliament passed the Stamp Act. That same month, the HM Sloop Diligence arrives at the port with stamps. However, angry citizens of Brunswick Town met the Captain at the dock refusing to allow the stamps off the ship. Governor Tryon attempted to calm residents down but he was determined to uphold the law. In February 1766, the Dobbs and the Patience arrived at Brunswick Town. The ships did not have stamp clearance, and were not allowed to unload.

On February 20, 1766, Patriot leaders, John Ashe, Cornelius Harnett, James Moore, Captain Robert Howe and Colonel Hugh Waddell led several hundred citizens to arrest royal officials in the town. The patriots also surrounded the governor's home in protest to the Stamp Act of 1765 and placed Tryon under house arrest. The protest was possibly one of the first incidents of violent colonial resistance to British rule. The protest resulted in the end of stamp tax collection for the Cape Fear region.

== Decline of the town ==
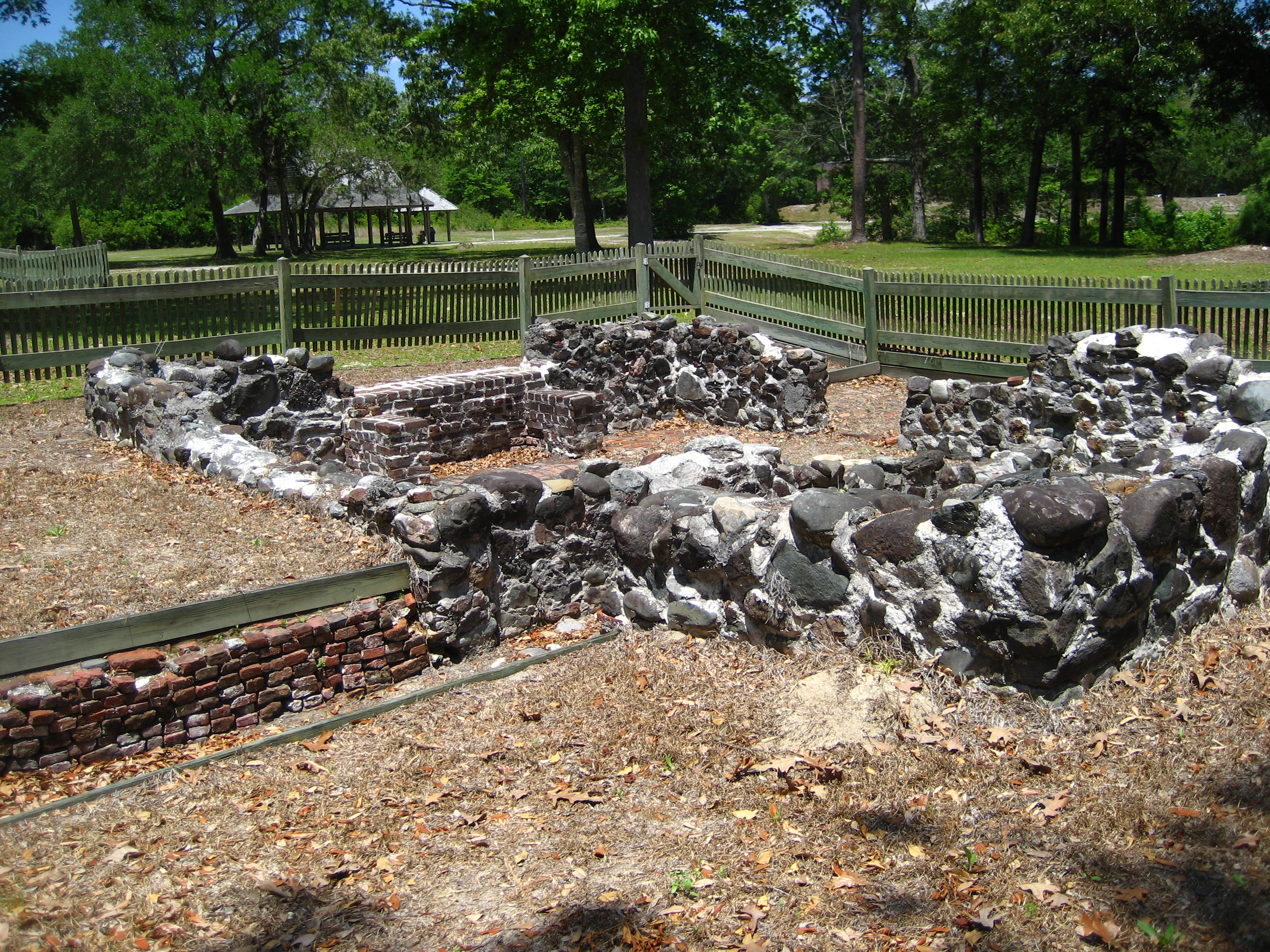
Hepburn-Reynolds House foundation in Brunswick Town Historic District (2008)

With the combination of Wilmington's continued growth and Tryon moving to his new palace in New Bern, the Town of Brunswick continued to decline.

By 1775, the few families that still lived in Brunswick Town fled due to fears of a British attack during the American Revolutionary War. On July 18–21, 1775, Patriots led by Robert Howe, Cornelius Harnett, and John Ashe attacked Fort Johnston while Captain Collett and Governor Josiah Martin watched from the Cruizer. The following spring of 1776, a British raiding party from the Royal Navy ship HMS Cruizer attacked Brunswick Town. The raiding party, led by Captain Collett, burned most of the town's structures including Russellborough and more than likely Saint Phillips Church . Later, under orders from General Clinton and General Cornwallis, British forces burned parts of the town again. After the war, two or three families returned to Brunswick. The port was still functioning but by 1830 the town site was completely abandoned and sold to Frederick Jones Hill, owner of Orton Plantation, for $4.25.

In March 1862, Confederate States Army engineers began to survey the remains of Brunswick Town. The Confederates built earthworks and trenches in the town site, covering the remains of several burnt structures except for St. Philip's Church. The fort was constructed to protect the city of Wilmington 10 miles (16 km) upstream, a vital port during the Civil War. The bastion was named Fort St. Philip, but renamed Fort Anderson in July 1863. During the attack on Fort Anderson in February 1865, cannonballs shot from Union ships in the Cape Fear River hit the walls of St. Philip's Church and are still evident today.

== Excavation ==
In 1899, the newly formed Cape Fear Chapter of the North Carolina Society of The Colonial Dames of America visited Brunswick Town to pay homage to Revolutionary War casualties. In 1902, the chapter erected a marble plaque inside the roofless ruins of St. Philip's to commemorate Brunswick Town founder Maurice Moore. In 1952, Dr. Lawrence Lee Jr. expressed interest in Brunswick Town and stated that the site should be excavated. Dr. Lee was contracted by the State Department of Archives and History, now known as the Department of Cultural Resources, in 1958 to clear out the land and find the town ruins. Dr. Lawrence Lee Jr. Requested the help of an archaeologist, Stanley South, who began extensive excavations at Brunswick Town in 1958, and retrieved items such as bullets, buttons, and a cannonball inside the St. Philip's Church ruins. The remains of Brunswick Town are now a state historic site. Visitors may tour the town's remains and the earthworks of Fort Anderson.

== In popular culture ==
Brunswick Town is also one of the settings in which the Sleepy Hollow television series has been filmed.
