= Fort Anderson (North Carolina) =

Historic district in North Carolina, United States

Coordinates: 34.040°N 77.946°W

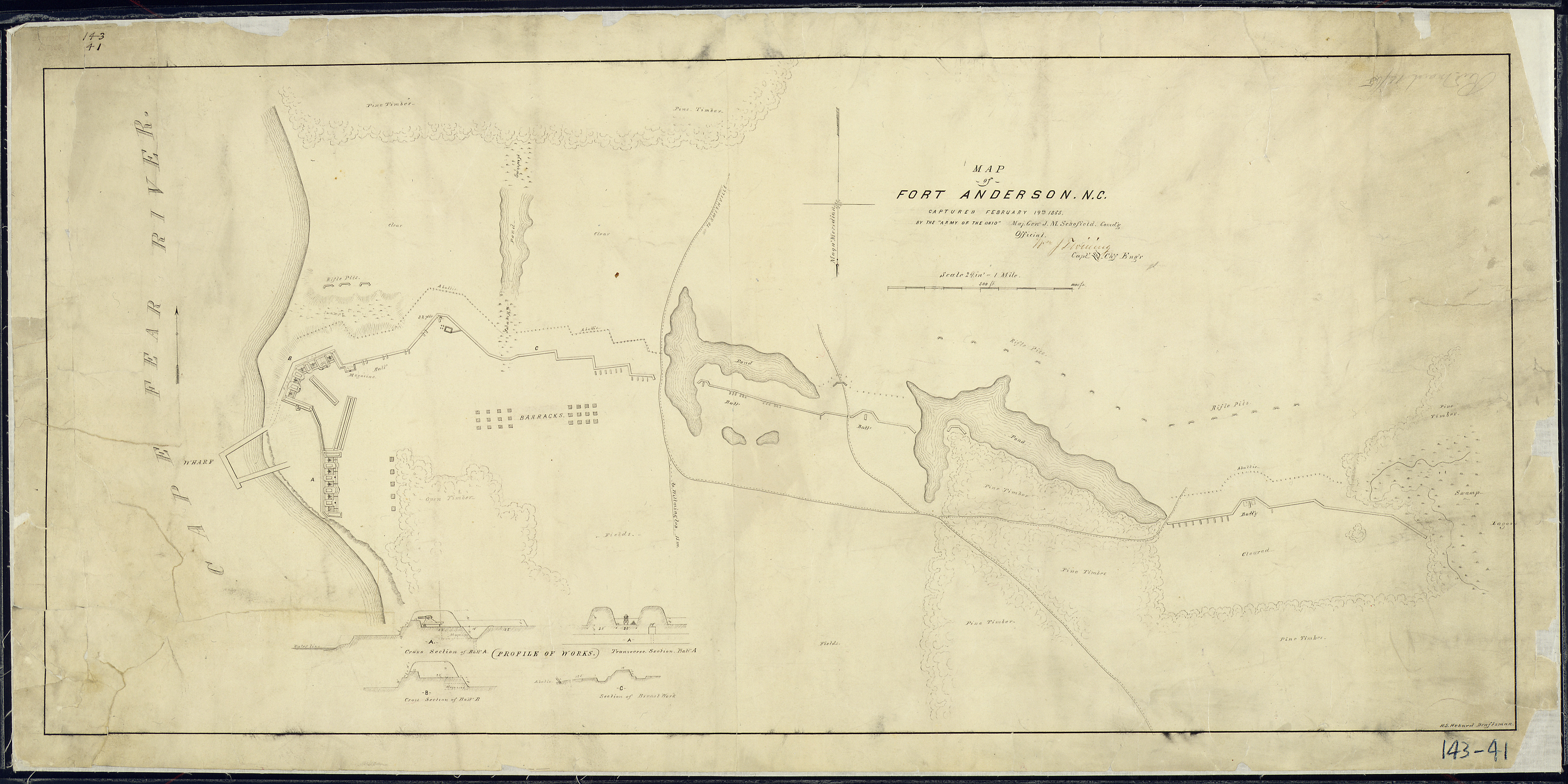
1865 map of Fort Anderson

Fort Anderson is a mid-19th-century earthen fort in the lower Cape Fear Region of North Carolina, located over the ruins of the colonial town of Brunswick in Brunswick County. It was built as a Confederate Fort by major general Samuel Gibbs French during the American Civil War. The fort was pivotal in protecting the Cape Fear River inlets and Wilmington upstream. Earthen batteries comprise the fort and were used as platforms and shields for the Confederate cannons. Beneath some of the earthworks were "bombproofs," shelters used by troops during enemy bombardment. The Confederacy decided to build forts around the Cape Fear River to protect the port of Wilmington from the Union blockade. During the Civil War, blockade runners brought supplies such as iron, guns, and ammunition to the Confederacy. The purpose of the fort was to hinder movement of Union ships, and to serve as a dropping off point for blockade runners fortunate enough to make it up the mouth of the Cape Fear River. Fort Anderson was built on the ruins of Brunswick Town and was originally named Fort St. Philip, after the ruins of the Revolutionary period church nearby. The name was changed to honor Col. George B. Anderson.

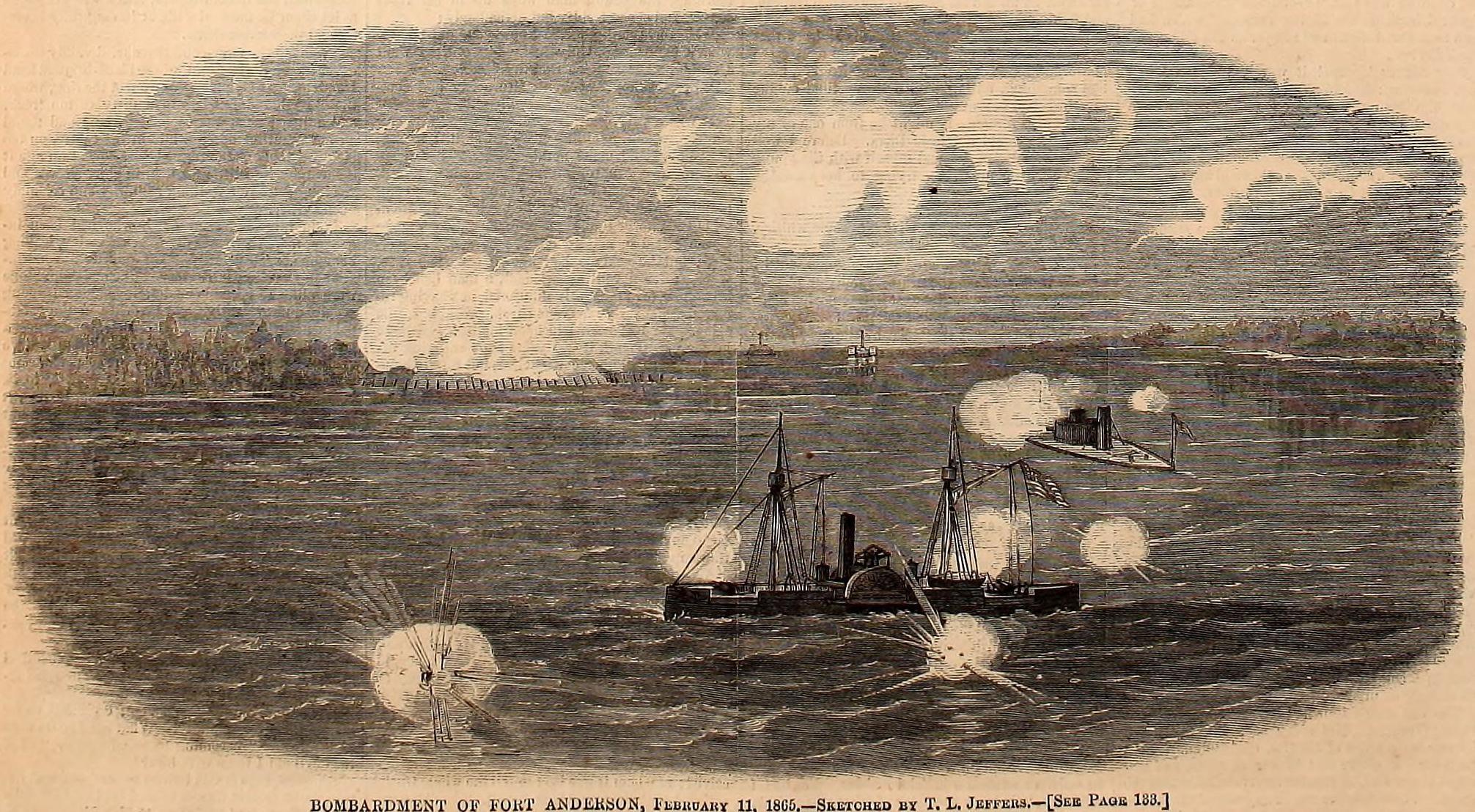
The Bombardment of Fort Anderson, February 11, 1865

== Excavation ==
Lawrence Lee was the first to begin exploring and researching the land in 1951 where Brunswick Town and Fort Anderson once stood. He realized how historically valuable the land was. Because of him, the site was named a historic site. The family that owned Orton Plantation sold a majority of the land to the State Department of Archives and History for one dollar and the Episcopal Diocese of East Carolina sold the land they owned for one dollar too. Seven years later, he directed the recovery of the site. From the excavation, many things were revealed. For example: Brunswick Town's streets and the foundations of houses. In 1958, Stanly South, a professional archaeologist, came to the site to work. Through the years, he and his team found artifacts, foundations of old structures, and around sixty archeological features.

In April 1967, the visitor center opened. Its purpose was to inform everyone on the history of Brunswick Town and Fort Anderson. Excavation was halted in 1968 due to North Carolina's Department of Cultural Resources stopping excavation in all state-owned parks. It was because of money issues that this occurred. This is still a problem even today.

=== Excavations today ===
Under the supervision of Professor Tom Beaman excavations have begun of the civil war barracks of the site. Peace College field school has helped excavated as well as the students of Summer Ventures, Wake Technical College, UNCW and many other volunteers. Ground breaking artifacts are still being found and Fort Anderson will continue to be excavated in the future.

== Historic site ==
The site belongs to the North Carolina Department of Natural and Cultural Resources, which operates the area as Brunswick Town/Fort Anderson State Historic Site. The visitor center features displays and an audiovisual program about both the colonial port Brunswick Town and the Civil War period Fort Anderson. Outdoor trails lead past exhibits and the excavated ruins of the fort and town.

== In popular culture ==
This historical site has also been used as a set location for the Sleepy Hollow TV show, as parts of Purgatory, and the location of Methuselah's sword. The museum on site was also used in a scene.
