= Bald Head Island, North Carolina =

Bald Head Island
- Village
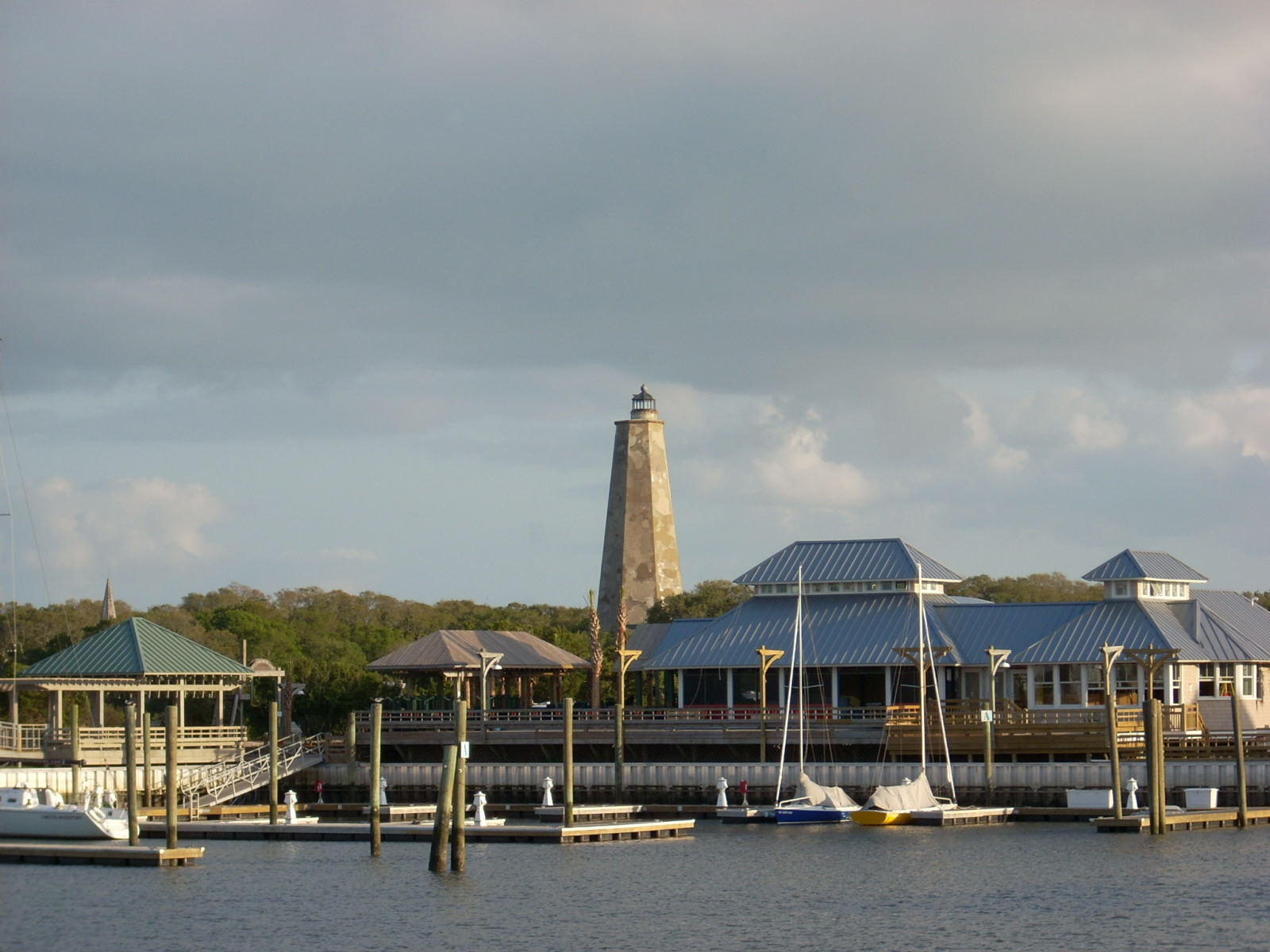
- Bald Head Island Marina with Old Baldy lighthouse

- Seal
- Nickname: "Old Baldy"
- Interactive map of Bald Head Island
- Location within the state of North Carolina
- Coordinates: 33°51′55″N 78°00′19″W
- Country: United States
- State: North Carolina
- County: Brunswick
- Township: Smithville Township
- Founded: 1817

Government
  - Mayor: Peter Quinn

Area
  - Total: 5.86 sq mi (15.18 km^{2})
  - Land: 3.92 sq mi (10.14 km^{2})
  - Water: 1.95 sq mi (5.04 km^{2})
- Elevation: 0 ft (0 m)

Population (2020)
  - Total: 268
  - Density: 68.5/sq mi (26.43/km^{2})
- Time zone: UTC-5 (EST)
  - Summer (DST): UTC-4 (EDT)
- ZIP code: 28461
- Area codes: 910, 472
- FIPS code: 37-03150
- GNIS feature ID: 2407414
- Website: www.villagebhi.org

Bald Head Island, historically known as Smith Island, is a village located on the east side of the Cape Fear River in Brunswick County, North Carolina, United States. Compared to the nearby city of Wilmington to the north, the village of Bald Head Island is small and somewhat remote. Despite its name, Bald Head Island is not an island. The historical Corncake Inlet that separated it from Kure Beach, filled in after Hurricane Floyd in 1999, and has remained closed ever since. It is accessible by ferry from the nearby town of Southport and by four-wheel drive vehicle along the beach strand from Fort Fisher to the north. Only government officials are allowed to drive the beach strand route. There are few cars on the island; instead, residents drive modified electric golf carts. Bald Head Island is nationally recognized for its sea turtle nesting activity.

The population of the village was 268 at the 2020 census. The village is part of the Wilmington metropolitan area.

The village is revered for its picturesque nature and is a popular location for vacationing. It was the primary filming location for the film Weekend at Bernie's in 1989 as well as a major location in The Butcher's Wife in 1991. "Old Baldy", its out-of-service lighthouse built in 1817, is the oldest still standing in the state.

== History ==
Bald Head Island is tiny but has played a part in two American wars. During the American Revolution, it was home to Fort George, a British fort. During the Civil War, the same redoubts served as Fort Holmes, a Confederate base of importance to shipping and smuggling.

Located at the tip of Cape Fear and residing at the convergence of the Cape Fear River and Atlantic Gulf Stream, the land mass of Bald Head Island ends, trailing off into 30 miles (48 km) of treacherous sand bars known as Frying Pan Shoals. In this area, large sand bars seasonally emerge from and subsequently retreat into the sea. These topographical transformations are often as rapid as they are drastic. The consensus view is that Bald Head Island emerged from one such sandbar, stabilized by a succession of plant life, leading to a permanent land mass.

Author David Stick surmises that Native Americans used Bald Head Island in much the same way that it is used now, as a seasonal retreat. Bald Head Island's creek estuaries and its abundance of shellfish were probably as attractive to Native American fishermen as they are to modern fishermen. Shellmounds found on Middle Island and Bluff Island indicate that Native Americans did visit the Smith Island complex, but disease and war killed off most of the Native American population, so it is difficult to know much about the original inhabitants.

Throughout the early European history of the Cape Fear region, Bald Head Island underwent several settlement attempts and went by many names. Unlike the specific landmarks which were renamed by each settler, the region was always known by the well-earned name, "Cape Fear".

Though Spanish sailors probably frequented the island on their way to intercept the Gulf Stream off Cape Hatteras, Pedro de Quexos was the first documented explorer of the region in the 1520s, naming what is now the Santee River the "River Jordan." Quexos' sponsor, Lucas Vázquez de Ayllón, visited the region himself in 1526. When Ayllón lost a ship to the treacherous shoals he abandoned his exploration efforts.

Over one hundred years after Quexos, William Hilton initiated an expedition called the "Adventures about Cape Fayre" by English Puritan dissidents in the 1660s. The effort was abandoned due to difficulties farming the sandy barren soil. Hilton returned in 1667 with the support of backers from Barbados, the "Barbados Adventurers", aboard a ship, the Adventure (now the name of one of the Bald Head Island ferries). His efforts were again foiled by barren soil.

In 1664, John Vassal founded "Charles Town" with the aid of Barbadian backers on the west bank of what is now the Cape Fear River (which Vassal named the "Charles River"). His efforts failed due to his agitation of the native population. He was further dissuaded when his efforts to become governor of the region, Clarendon County, were subverted and the title was given to John Yeamans. After the settlers abandoned Charles Town, Yeamans nearly lost his life when his boat sank in a maze of sand bars in the mouth of the Charles River. Instead of trying to revive the colony, Yeamans established Charles Town farther south in what is now Charleston, South Carolina.

Charleston rapidly became a center of economic importance in the colonies. Charleston businessmen often engaged in trade with Native Americans in the vicinity of Cape Fear, reaping such prosperity that they had to pay special duties. Duties created political conflicts which ultimately led to the colony of the Carolinas being divided in 1710 along the Cape Fear River (named the "Clarendon River" by then). In 1713, to help establish the northern colony's claim along the eastern bank, Thomas Smith, son of former Carolina governor Thomas Smith, Sr. was issued a land grant to what we now call Smith Island (called "Cape Island" at the time).

In 1776, Bald Head Island was briefly involved in the Revolutionary War after British Major General Henry Clinton and Lieutenant General Charles Cornwallis used the island as a staging area for their voyage to Charleston, South Carolina. The British left behind a small garrison of troops with a few naval vessels to help keep the port closed to Continental shipping. The garrison of about 30 troops, under the command of Captain John Linzee, created Fort George (after King George) on the southwestern corner of Bald Head Island. Continental Brig. General Robert Howe was stationed across the river in Fort Johnson. After watching the British carefully, the Continentals launched a raid of 150 men on September 6, led by Col. Polk, against Fort George. Polk's men captured five British sailors but were forced to flee when the remaining 25 took cover and the British vessels moored just off-shore opened fire and initiated pursuit. Polk used local knowledge, fleeing through a maze of shallow creeks, and escaped with only minor casualties (1 killed, 1 wounded). By October, the British troops withdrew and Bald Head saw no further action during the Revolution.

In 1863, Confederate troops constructed a fort named Fort Holmes as part of a defensive system for the Cape Fear River Basin, although no major battles were fought in this region during the U.S. Civil War.

In 1913, the island was purchased by T.F. Boyd and renamed "Palmetto Island." Boyd subsequently built a beach boardwalk, pavilion and an eight-room hotel, before he lost the island in foreclosure due to failure to pay back taxes during the Great Depression.

In 1938, Frank Sherrill bought the island with the intention to develop it further. In 1970, Sherrill sold the island to the Cape Fear Corporation, which deeded three fourths of the island to the state of North Carolina for conservation. Since 1983, Bald Head Island Limited has been the named developer.

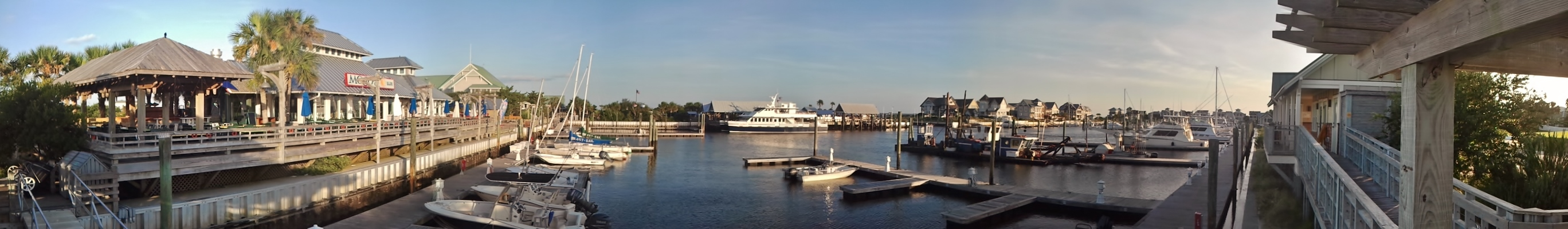
Marina

== Lighthouses ==
=== Original lighthouse ===
The construction of a lighthouse at the mouth of the Cape Fear River was authorized by the Commissioners of the Cape Fear in 1789. The commission specified that the light be built "at the extreme point on Bald-head or some other convenient place near the bar of said river, in order that vessels may be enabled thereby to avoid the great shoal called Frying-Pan." Funds had been raised for the implementation of navigation aids by taxing vessels entering the Port of Brunswick at six pence per ton. Additional funds were provided by the newly formed US Congress, who in August 1789 assumed responsibility for construction, maintenance and operation of all "lighthouses, beacons, buoys and public piers" in the United States. Land for the light was donated by Benjamin Smith in exchange for increased hunting regulation on the island.

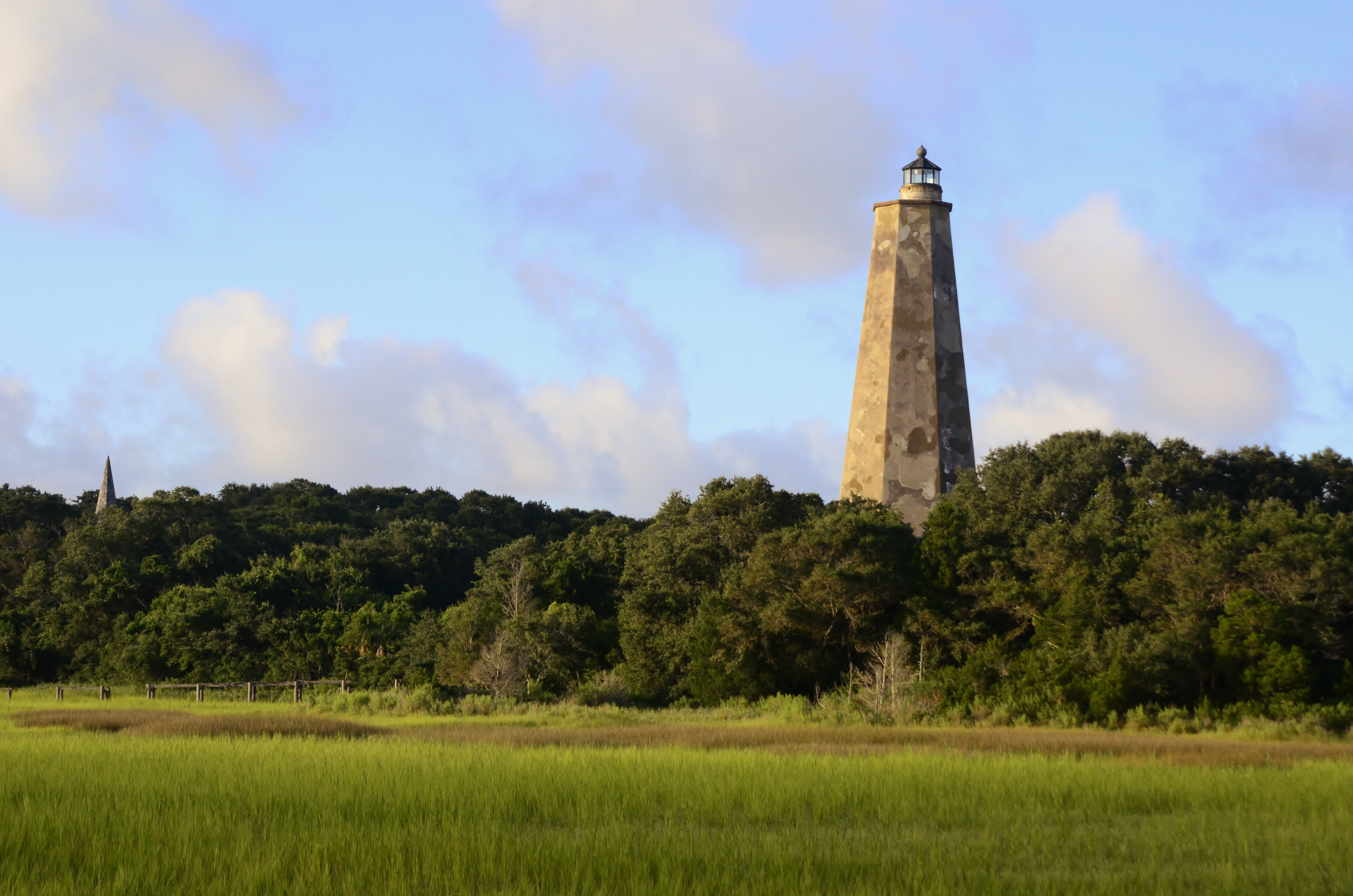
Old Baldy Lighthouse

Construction of the original light was completed in December 1794 at a final cost of $11,359.14. The light was placed under the care of lightkeeper Henry Long, who operated the light until 1806 when he was killed in a hunting accident on the island. After Long's death Sedgewick Springs was appointed as keeper of the light at Bald Head after twelve local residents signed the following petition to U.S. President Thomas Jefferson recommending him for the position.

We the subscribers resident citizens in the District and town of Wilmington being informed that Sedgwick Springs wishes to become a keeper of the light house on Bald Head (provided it should be thought the widow of the late Henry Long, inadequate to the safe keeping thereof) beg leave hereby to recommend the said Sedgwick Springs as a fit and proper person to take charge and keep up the said light—he being an old inhabitant of the town of Wilmington a sober industrious citizen having been employed for these eight years last past and now is an Inspector of the Revenue in which office he has ever behaved himself as a diligent and Careful Officer and to our knowledge conducted himself as a truly honest man in all his dealings.

Less than twenty years after it was built, the original light succumbed to erosion as it had been built too close to the water. By July 1813 the light was officially declared inoperable.

=== Old Baldy ===
In 1813 Congress allocated $15,000 to build a new lighthouse on Bald Head, as the existing light had been rendered inoperable by erosion. This time they planned to build a sturdy lighthouse on high ground, away from eroding shores. Revenue Commissioner Samuel H. Smith wrote a detailed specification outlining how the light was to be built to ensure its longevity. Daniel Way was awarded the contract to build the light and keepers quarters. Using bricks from the original light, Way completed the project in 1817 at a cost of $15,915.45. In total Cash

Immediately after lighting this lighthouse (now known as Old Baldy Light) it was discovered that the new light was not tall enough or bright enough to help vessels navigate around Frying Pan Shoals. Its purpose was limited to helping vessels enter the southern entrance to the Cape Fear River. To avoid Frying Pan Shoals, many vessels decided to enter the Cape Fear through New Inlet at Fort Fisher, about 7 miles (11 km) north of Bald Head Island. As a result, little emphasis was placed on maintaining Old Baldy, and by the mid-1830s the lighthouse began to fall into disrepair as its longtime keeper, Sedgewick Springs, an elderly veteran of the Revolutionary War became increasingly infirm.

Old Baldy was effectively decommissioned for the first time at the outset of the Civil War when the Confederate States turned off all their lighthouses in order to hinder navigation of Union vessels. At the end of the War Old Baldy was not re-lit. The light was in disrepair and of little use with most vessels entering New Inlet, which had its own lighthouse at Federal Point.

Circumstances changed by 1879 when natural forces closed New Inlet forcing the closure of the Federal Point light and the re-lighting of Old Baldy. Improvements were made to Old Baldy including a new light, keepers quarters, and a stone jetty to stabilize the shoreline which had begun eroding quickly due to the closure of New Inlet. According to reports, the jetty was built just in time to prevent Old Baldy from falling into the sea during the hurricane of September 1883.

Old Baldy was downgraded from a lighthouse to a navigational radio beacon in 1935. It was completely decommissioned in 1959 when the Oak Island Light was built. Old Baldy Lighthouse now stands as the oldest lighthouse in North Carolina, having survived neglect, war and weather. It is on the National Register of Historic Places and is open to the public.

An impressive view of the Cape Fear River estuary can be seen when climbing Old Baldy Lighthouse's 108 spiral steps.

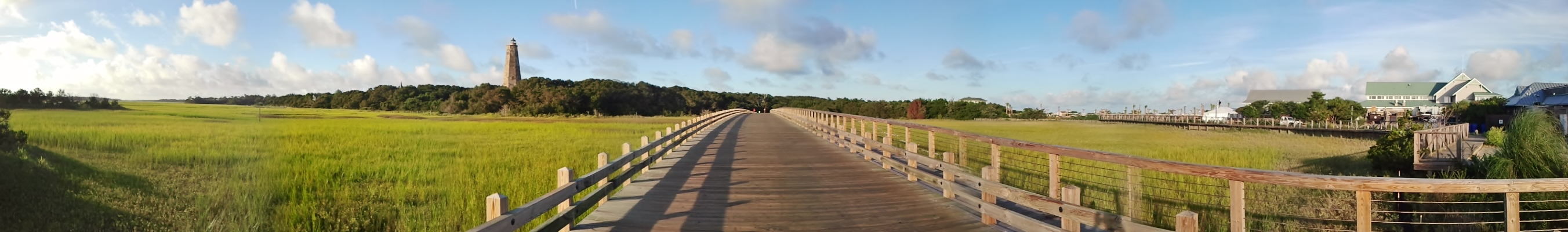
Panorama of the marsh

=== Cape Fear Light ===
Old Baldy lighthouse, built in 1817, was not tall enough or bright enough to aid vessels trying to avoid Frying Pan Shoals in all weather conditions. To remedy the problem, a lightship was stationed on the shoals themselves in the mid-1800s. On multiple occasions the lightship broke loose and drifted freely, leaving Frying Pan Shoals without a light, or worse with a light in the wrong place. This problem was compounded when New Inlet closed and vessels were no longer able to avoid navigating around the shoals.

Requests to increase the height of Old Baldy and install a more powerful first order Fresnel lens to make it bright enough to safely guide ships around Frying Pan Shoals were never approved. Instead proposals for construction of a second lighthouse on Bald Head Island started in 1889 with the suggestion that a new 150-foot-tall (46 m), 18.5-mile-visibility (29.8 km), masonry tower be built at a cost of $150,000. Approval did not come until 1898, at which time it was suggested that a steel tower be built for $70,000. Land for the construction site on the east end of Bald Head Island had to be condemned by the state from the island's owner. Construction began in 1901 by laying a railway from the west end of the island to the east. This railway would transport materials and supplies over 3 miles (5 km) to the site both during construction and operation. The Cape Fear Light was operational on August 31, 1903. The light was operated by Devaney F. Jennette and then by Capt. Charlie Swan.

In 1958, the Cape Fear Light was demolished and replaced by the Oak Island Light. Lightships and a light tower were used to augment navigation around Frying Pan Shoals through the 1970s.

== Nature ==
The Bald Head Island Conservancy actively monitors water quality, the dunes, maritime forest and salt marsh. The BHI Conservancy in partnership with the USGS installed a real-time water quality monitor on one of the wells on the west side of the island. Data can be found on the USGS's website.

A partnership between the BHI Conservancy, North Carolina Wildlife Resources Commission, the EPA and a group affiliated with the BHI Conservancy, Friends of BHI Deer is currently working on North Carolina's first Non-Lethal Deer Management Project.

The BHI Conservancy and NC State University will install a research-grade weather station on Bald Head Island. This will help researchers, the Conservancy and BHI Village better understand a variety of weather elements and provide a foundation of information to help island officials make decisions.

The Island has four distinct habitats: beach and dunes; maritime forest; freshwater lagoons; and salt marsh/estuary. Live oak, cabbage palmetto, and longleaf pine are the most common trees found in the maritime forests and marsh hammocks. 10,000 of the total 12,400 acres that make up Bald Head Island are protected due to their use as nesting, wading, and migrating grounds for birds and other species.

People from all over the world visit BHI for its birding in all season. To date over 260 species of birds have been documented on Bald Head Island, these include the white ibis, osprey, anhinga, snowy egret, great blue heron, tricolored heron, painted bunting, brown pelican, laughing gull, royal tern, and bald eagle. The Bald Head Island Conservancy offers a naturalist guided birding trip throughout the year.

Researchers from the North Carolina Museum of Natural Sciences visit Bald Head every summer to observe and tag painted buntings.

=== Sea Turtles ===
Bald Head Island is nationally recognized for its sea turtle nesting activity. The abundance of sea turtle nests have led visitors to use the phrase, "I'm on Turtle Time", which signifies the care free (and car free) feeling of being on Bald Head Island.

Efforts to protect the habitats and activities of sea turtles on the Island date back to 1980. The Bald Head Island Conservancy has coordinated and sponsored a sea turtle protection program since 1983 and is the only non-government entity in North Carolina allowed to flipper tag nesting sea turtles. Each summer, the Conservancy funds and houses multiple interns to conduct field work for this program, under the direction of a sea turtle biologist. This internship is unique, demanding, and ultra-competitive.

Only four of the seven species of sea turtles nest on Bald Head Island. Loggerhead turtles are most common. Every season sees a few green turtles. In 2010, a leatherback turtle laid its first nest. Although rare, Bald Head has also had Kemp's ridley turtle nests, including one in 2020. These turtles are often found in different parts of the island and surrounding waters. The Kemp's ridley and loggerhead sea turtles are often found in estuarine and oceanic waters, whereas the hawksbill and leatherback sea turtles are often found in oceanic waters.

Visitors to Bald Head Island can join the Conservancy's Sea Turtle Protection Staff for a nightly Turtle Walk. After a 45-minute presentation about the renowned program and basic sea turtle biology, attendees are led to the beach to await sea turtle nestings or hatchings. The Conservancy is granted permission to conduct the Turtle Walks through a special state permit that restricts the group size to 25 Conservancy members a night.

=== Alligators ===
Alligators can be found in freshwater lagoons throughout Bald Head Island, though they can also be found laying out on the golf courses, salt marshes, or crossing the road. The Bald Head Association recently renovated the Wildlife Overlook - a lagoon where alligators are commonly seen - in September 2021 and added new improvements in November 2023.

Sightings are frequent during warmer months, though visitors are prohibited from feeding, harassing, and killing alligators. Alligators are typically harmless, but, if you encounter an alligator, it is recommended that you give it space, do not interact with it, and do not approach or follow it. The Bald Head Island Conservancy estimates that the total population on the island is about 30 - one third of which being longer than 4 feet.

One of the most notable alligators of Bald Head Island was Stumpy II - "a well-loved inhabitant of the Wildlife Overlook lagoon". He earned the name "Stumpy II" because he was missing his left rear leg, which was likely a result of an interaction with another alligator. He died in August 2024 at nine feet long and the estimated age of 15 to 20 years old. Stumpy II was recognized for his contributions to research on alligator health and population biology on BHI. He was captured in 2019 and 2022 for a North Carolina State University research project, which focused on assessing the health of alligators in response to PFAS and other contaminants. Alligators were critical to the study because they "can be good indicators of environmental effects on immune function" due to their robust immune systems and constant exposure to fresh water.

=== Effects on the Environment and Wildlife ===
In the past decade, there has been an influx of tourism to Bald Head Island. Though good for the small island's economy, the effects of pollution and building development on wildlife and nature of the island has been the focus of recent research.

==== PFAS ====
PFAS, per- and polyfluoroalkyl chemicals, have been found in the blood of Cape Fear alligators, which were captured on Bald Head Island in 2019. PFAS are also found in water, air, fish, and soil and exposure to these chemicals has been linked to harmful health effects for both humans and wildlife.

The BHI Conservancy has partnered with Belcher Lab to track alligator movements and potential exposure to different water sources, which will help reveal sources of PFAS to Bald Head Island's water.

==== Light Pollution ====
Light pollution affects sea turtles and their natural processes. From May 1 to October 31, Bald Head Island enforces ordinance against artificial lighting near and on beaches to protect sea turtles during nesting season. Lights that shine on nesting ground can draw turtle hatchlings away from the direction of the ocean, moon, and beach towards land, where they have a low chance of survival. These lights can also scare away incoming female turtles looking to nest on the beach.

The Village of Bald Head Island recommends that citizens "dig the dark" and only use red lights on the beach.

==== Microplastics ====
Microplastics have been found in the sand of Bald Head Island. These microplastics "have the potential to impact our endangered sea turtles" because the plastics can trap heat, making the sand too hot during incubation. The temperature eggs are exposed to during this period is especially important because sea turtles have temperature-dependent sex determination, meaning this excess heat impacts the sex ratio of the population. These plastics also have the potential to leach toxins into the environment, though it is unknown how these toxins would impact developing turtle eggs.

==== Zoning ====
Future development and zoning of the maritime forest of Bald Head Island could pose serious threats to the habitats, food webs, and wildlife of the island. These forests are "vital ecosystems that offer environmental resilience to coastal communities, acting as natural buffers against storms". Additionally, they help enhance wildlife biodiversity, provide aesthetic value, increase recreational opportunities, and filter pollutants. These plans could lead to a continued cycle of urbanization patterns and increase in impervious surfaces - both of which are major contributors to environmental change due to their effects on climate, water, and biodiversity.

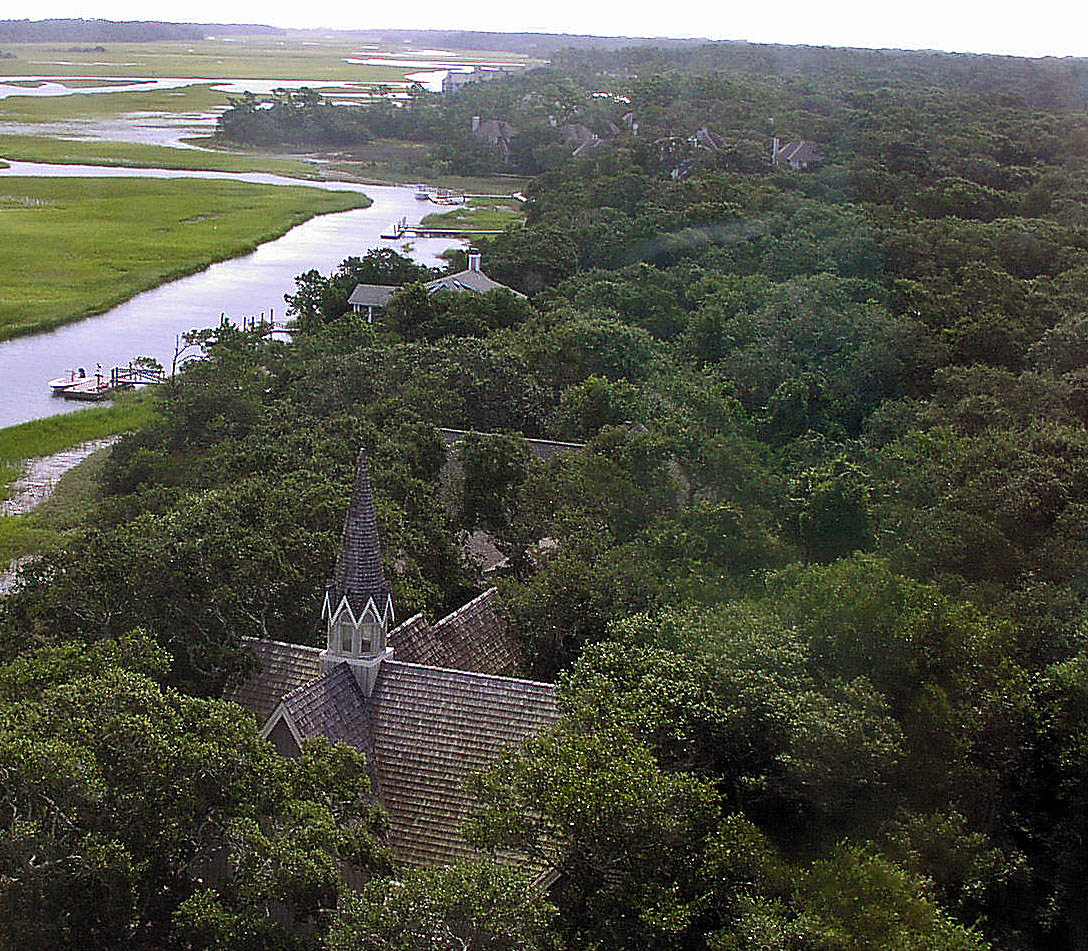
View of Bald Head Island from Old Baldy lighthouse

== Geography ==
Bald Head Island is located in southeastern Brunswick County and is the southernmost settlement in the state of North Carolina.

According to the United States Census Bureau, the village has a total area of 5.8 square miles (14.9 km^{2}), of which 3.9 square miles (10.0 km^{2}) is land and 1.9 square miles (4.9 km^{2}) (33.01%) is water.

There are three beaches on the island, and the northern side consists of marsh.

== Demographics ==
Historical population
| Census | Pop. | Note | %± |
|---|---|---|---|
| 1990 | 78 | | — |
| 2000 | 173 | | 121.8% |
| 2010 | 158 | | −8.7% |
| 2020 | 268 | | 69.6% |
U.S. Decennial Census

=== 2020 census ===
Bald Head Island racial composition
| Race | Number | Percentage |
|---|---|---|
| White (non-Hispanic) | 243 | 90.67% |
| Black or African American (non-Hispanic) | 10 | 3.73% |
| Asian | 1 | 0.37% |
| Other/Mixed | 5 | 1.87% |
| Hispanic or Latino | 9 | 3.36% |

As of the 2020 United States census, there were 268 people, 143 households, and 87 families residing in the village.

=== 2000 census ===
As of the census of 2000, there were 173 people, 88 households, and 71 families residing in the village. The population density was 40.3 inhabitants per square mile (15.6/km^{2}). There were 599 housing units at an average density of 139.5 per square mile (53.9/km^{2}). The racial makeup of the village was 95.38% White, 2.89% African American, 0.58% Native American, and 1.16% from two or more races.

There were 88 households, out of which 5.7% had children under the age of 18 living with them, 77.3% were married couples living together, 3.4% had a female householder with no husband present, and 19.3% were non-families. 18.2% of all households were made up of individuals, and 3.4% had someone living alone who was 65 years of age or older. The average household size was 1.97 and the average family size was 2.17.

In the village, the population was spread out, with 5.8% under the age of 18, 1.2% from 18 to 24, 11.0% from 25 to 44, 63.6% from 45 to 64, and 18.5% who were 65 years of age or older. The median age was 56 years. For every 100 females, there were 106.0 males. For every 100 females age 18 and over, there were 101.2 males.

The median income for a household in the village was $62,083, and the median income for a family was $56,964. Males had a median income of $51,250 versus $35,000 for females. The per capita income for the village was $45,585. About 10.8% of families and 10.3% of the population were below the poverty line, including 40.0% of those under the age of eighteen and none of those 65 or over.

== Death of Davina Buff Jones ==
The mysterious 1999 death of Bald Head Island police officer Davina Buff Jones–first ruled a suicide but later ruled undetermined–and subsequent botched criminal investigation has been featured on popular true crime podcasts Generation Why, Southern Fried True Crime, and My Favorite Murder. As of 2022, the case still remains unsolved.

== Climate ==
The island has a humid subtropical climate (Cfa), with hot, humid summers and cool winters with crisp nights. Precipitation is high and very plentiful year round.

Climate data for Bald Head Island, North Carolina
| Month | Jan | Feb | Mar | Apr | May | Jun | Jul | Aug | Sep | Oct | Nov | Dec | Year |
|---|---|---|---|---|---|---|---|---|---|---|---|---|---|
| Mean daily maximum °F (°C) | 55 (13) | 57 (14) | 64 (18) | 72 (22) | 79 (26) | 84 (29) | 88 (31) | 88 (31) | 84 (29) | 75 (24) | 68 (20) | 61 (16) | 73 (23) |
| Mean daily minimum °F (°C) | 34 (1) | 36 (2) | 43 (6) | 48 (9) | 57 (14) | 64 (18) | 70 (21) | 70 (21) | 63 (17) | 52 (11) | 43 (6) | 36 (2) | 52 (11) |
| Average precipitation inches (mm) | 5.3 (134) | 4.2 (106) | 4.5 (114) | 3.1 (78) | 4.1 (105) | 5.0 (128) | 6.7 (170) | 7.7 (195) | 8.9 (227) | 3.9 (98) | 3.5 (88) | 4.2 (106) | 61.0 (1,549) |
Source: The Weather Channel

| Preceded by Zeke's Island | Beaches of Southeastern North Carolina | Succeeded by Cape Fear |
