= Southport, North Carolina =

- City
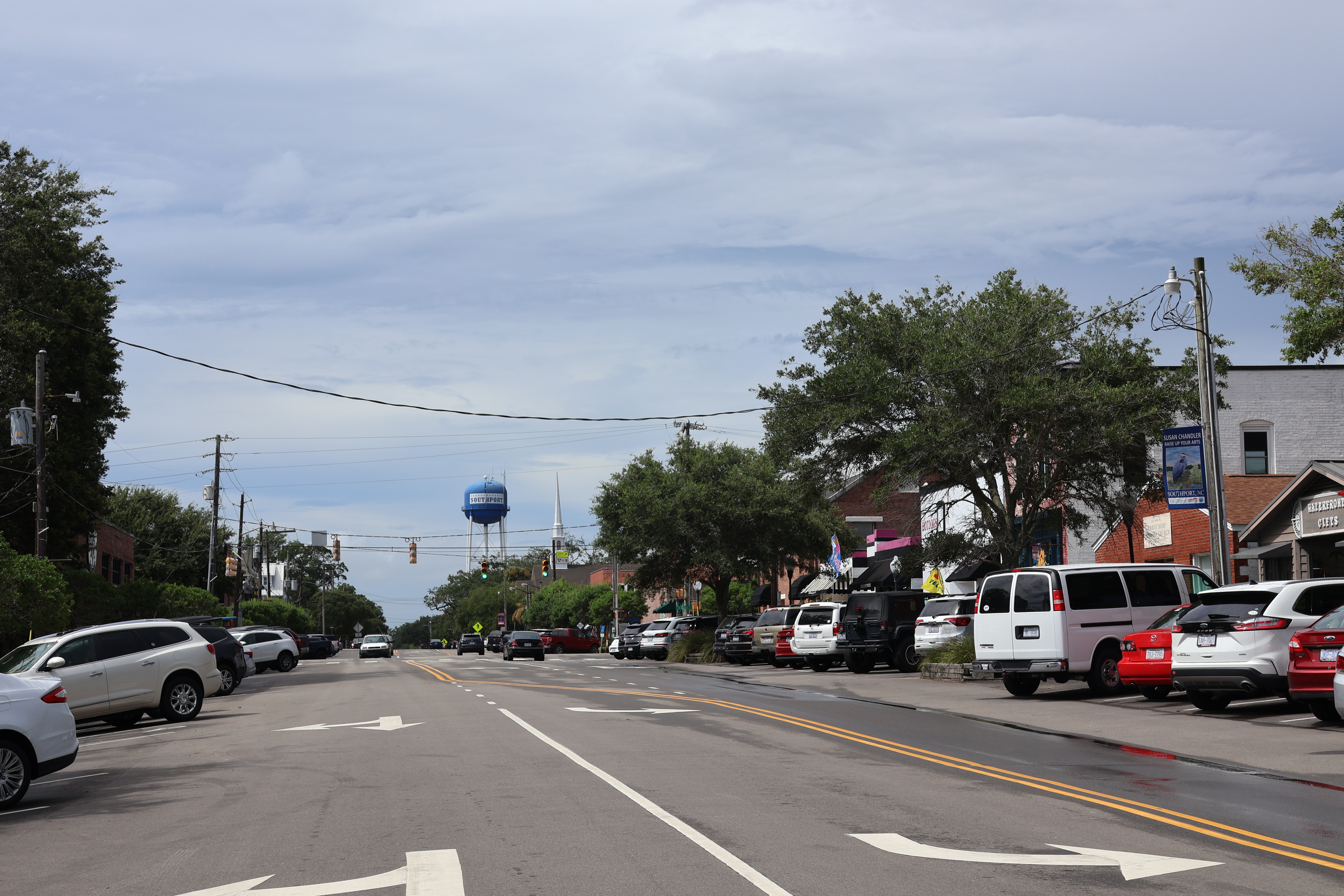
- South Howe Street

- Flag Seal
- Motto: "The Home of Salubrious Breezes"
- Location within the state of North Carolina
- Coordinates: 33°55′31″N 78°01′10″W
- Country: United States
- State: North Carolina
- County: Brunswick
- Established: 1792

Government
  - Type: Council-Manager
  - Mayor: Dr. Joe Pat Hatem
  - City Manager: Noah Saldo

Area
  - Total: 4.04 sq mi (10.47 km^{2})
  - Land: 4.00 sq mi (10.37 km^{2})
  - Water: 0.035 sq mi (0.09 km^{2})
- Elevation: 20 ft (6.1 m)

Population (2020)
  - Total: 3,971
  - Density: 991.7/sq mi (382.89/km^{2})
- Time zone: UTC−5 (Eastern Time Zone (North America))
  - Summer (DST): UTC−4 (EDT)
- ZIP code: 28461
- Area codes: 910, 472
- FIPS code: 37-63400
- GNIS feature ID: 2405498
- Website: www.cityofsouthport.gov

Southport is a city in Brunswick County, North Carolina, United States, near the mouth of the Cape Fear River. Its population was 3,971 as of the 2020 census.

Southport is the location of the North Carolina Fourth of July Festival, which attracts 40,000 to 50,000 visitors annually.

== History ==
The Southport area was explored in the 1500s by Spanish explorers. During the 18th century, British settlements along the Carolina coast lacked fortifications to protect against pirates and privateers, and numerous Spanish attackers exploited this weakness. In response to these attacks, Governor Gabriel Johnston in 1744 appointed a committee to select the best location to construct a fort for the defense of the Cape Fear River region. It was determined that the fort should be constructed at a site at the mouth of the Cape Fear River. During the same year, France declared war against Britain, later known as King George's War, increasing the fort's need. Further, increasingly bold Spanish privateer raids led the North Carolina General Assembly to authorize the construction of "Johnston's Fort" in April 1745, which would come to be known as Fort Johnston. The governor of South Carolina agreed to lend ten small cannons for the fort, and the legislature, in spring 1748, appropriated 2,000 pounds for construction costs, and construction finally began. Southport developed around Fort Johnston.

Southport was founded as the town of Smithville in 1792. Joshua Potts had requested the formation of a town adjacent to Fort Johnston, and the North Carolina General Assembly formed a commission of five men to administer its founding. The town was named after Benjamin Smith, a colonel in the Continental Army during the Revolutionary War and later governor of North Carolina. Smithville grew as a fishing village and through supporting military activity. Smithville was the county seat of Brunswick County from 1808 to 1977. In an effort to promote the town as a major shipping port, Smithville was renamed Southport in 1887. Smithville Township, in which Southport lies, and other local landmarks, such as the cemetery, retain the Smithville name.

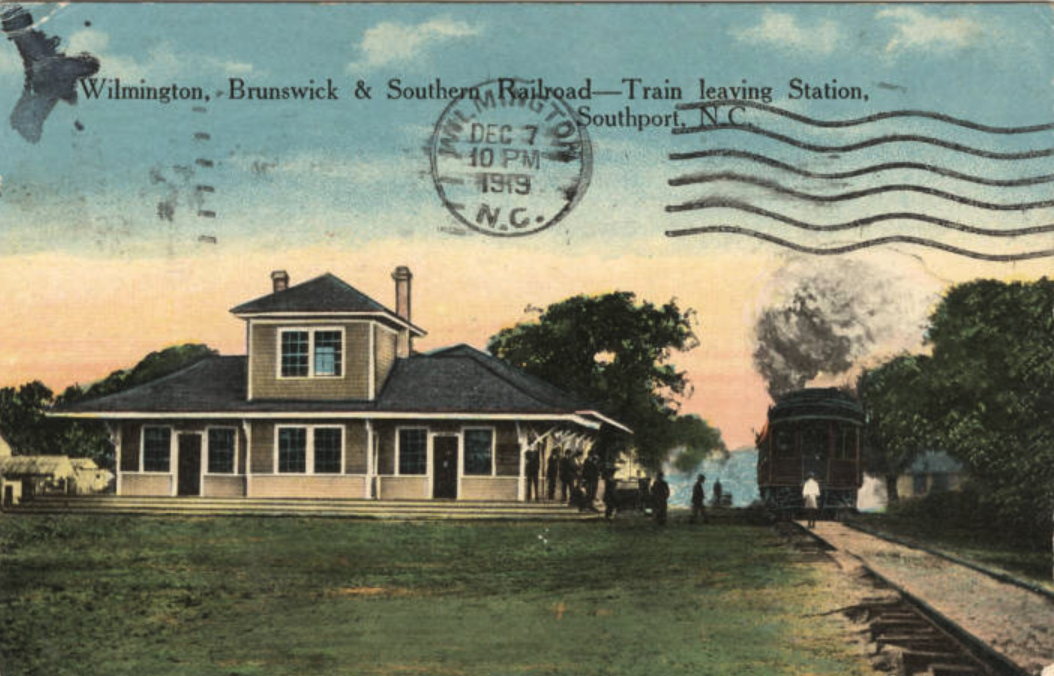
Old Train Station on Rhett St.

Interest in making Southport a major commercial port then prompted efforts to connect it via rail to Wilmington and the Atlantic Coast Line/Seaboard Air Line Railroad systems. After some 25 years of failed effort by various entrepreneurs, the Wilmington, Brunswick and Southern Railroad began operation in 1911. Running northwest out of Southport to Bolivia, the line then turned northeast towards Navassa where it joined the existing rail network. Poorly constructed, beset with continued revenue shortfalls and facing intense and growing competition from trucks/automobiles, the 30 mile long railroad ceased operation in 1945. Ten years later, the U.S. Government constructed the rail line from the Military Ocean Terminal Sunny Point just north of Southport to the interior rail system along a different, more direct path.

On September 27, 2025, a person opened fire from a boat in the Intracoastal Waterway at the American Fish Company in the Yacht Basin area of the city. Three people were killed and a further six were injured. The suspect was arrested while loading his boat in Oak Island a short time later.

== Government ==
Southport has a council–manager form of government. The mayor is elected for a two-year term. The Southport Board of Aldermen is made up of six members elected to represent two wards but are elected by the whole City for four-year terms. The mayor is ex officio chair of the Board of Aldermen and only votes in case of a tie.

== Geography ==
Southport is located in southeastern Brunswick County on the northwest bank of the tidal Cape Fear River, approximately 2 miles (3 km) inland from the Atlantic Ocean. North Carolina Highway 211 enters the city from the north as North Howe Street and travels south to one block north of the waterfront, where it turns east as East Moore Street, leading northeast to the city limits, where it turns east again as Ferry Road on its way to the western terminus of the Southport–Fort Fisher ferry across the Cape Fear River.

According to the United States Census Bureau, the city has a total area of 3.8 square miles (9.8 km^{2}), of which 3.7 square miles (9.7 km^{2}) is land and 0.04 square miles (0.1 km^{2}), or 0.73%, is water.

=== Climate ===
Southport has a humid subtropical climate (Cfa). Summers in Southport are very hot and humid while winters are very mild by North Carolina standards. Southport is the warmest place in the state of North Carolina, with a yearly average temperature of 65.0 °F (18.3 °C), with annual temperatures more similar to that of coastal Georgia or the northern Gulf Coast of Florida than the rest of North Carolina.

Climate data for Southport 5 N, North Carolina (1991–2020 normals, extremes 1892–2016)
Month	Jan	Feb	Mar	Apr	May	Jun	Jul	Aug	Sep	Oct	Nov	Dec	Year
Record high °F (°C)	82 (28)	81 (27)	90 (32)	94 (34)	97 (36)	103 (39)	102 (39)	102 (39)	101 (38)	94 (34)	88 (31)	81 (27)	103 (39)
Mean maximum °F (°C)	71.7 (22.1)	74.6 (23.7)	78.8 (26.0)	84.3 (29.1)	89.1 (31.7)	94.3 (34.6)	96.2 (35.7)	95.2 (35.1)	90.8 (32.7)	86.1 (30.1)	81.1 (27.3)	74.2 (23.4)	98.1 (36.7)
Mean daily maximum °F (°C)	60.0 (15.6)	62.5 (16.9)	68.2 (20.1)	75.8 (24.3)	82.5 (28.1)	88.4 (31.3)	91.6 (33.1)	90.4 (32.4)	86.5 (30.3)	78.9 (26.1)	69.9 (21.1)	62.9 (17.2)	76.5 (24.7)
Daily mean °F (°C)	47.8 (8.8)	50.1 (10.1)	55.5 (13.1)	63.3 (17.4)	71.2 (21.8)	78.7 (25.9)	82.2 (27.9)	80.8 (27.1)	76.3 (24.6)	66.6 (19.2)	57.1 (13.9)	50.5 (10.3)	65.0 (18.3)
Mean daily minimum °F (°C)	35.5 (1.9)	37.6 (3.1)	42.7 (5.9)	50.9 (10.5)	60.0 (15.6)	69.0 (20.6)	72.8 (22.7)	71.2 (21.8)	66.0 (18.9)	54.4 (12.4)	44.3 (6.8)	38.0 (3.3)	53.5 (11.9)
Mean minimum °F (°C)	16.0 (−8.9)	19.9 (−6.7)	25.7 (−3.5)	33.3 (0.7)	43.8 (6.6)	54.8 (12.7)	62.7 (17.1)	60.7 (15.9)	51.9 (11.1)	36.3 (2.4)	27.7 (−2.4)	18.2 (−7.7)	12.2 (−11.0)
Record low °F (°C)	0 (−18)	1 (−17)	8 (−13)	25 (−4)	36 (2)	45 (7)	46 (8)	53 (12)	35 (2)	23 (−5)	16 (−9)	−3 (−19)	−3 (−19)
Average precipitation inches (mm)	3.70 (94)	3.32 (84)	4.03 (102)	3.08 (78)	3.44 (87)	4.02 (102)	5.55 (141)	6.77 (172)	8.16 (207)	5.41 (137)	3.42 (87)	3.74 (95)	54.64 (1,388)
Average precipitation days (≥ 0.01 in)	8.2	8.7	8.0	6.0	7.7	9.0	10.0	11.0	9.8	7.1	7.4	8.6	101.5
Source: NOAA (mean maxima/minima 1981–2010)

== Demographics ==
Historical population
Census	Pop.	Note	%±
1870	810		—
1880	1,008		24.4%
1890	1,207		19.7%
1900	1,336		10.7%
1910	1,484		11.1%
1920	1,664		12.1%
1930	1,760		5.8%
1940	1,760		0.0%
1950	1,748		−0.7%
1960	2,034		16.4%
1970	2,220		9.1%
1980	2,824		27.2%
1990	2,369		−16.1%
2000	2,351		−0.8%
2010	2,833		20.5%
2020	3,971		40.2%
U.S. Decennial Census

=== 2020 census ===
As of the 2020 census, Southport had a population of 3,971. The median age was 62.9 years. 10.1% of residents were under the age of 18 and 44.6% of residents were 65 years of age or older. For every 100 females there were 78.5 males, and for every 100 females age 18 and over there were 78.2 males age 18 and over.

99.9% of residents lived in urban areas, while 0.1% lived in rural areas.

There were 1,985 households in Southport, of which 11.5% had children under the age of 18 living in them. Of all households, 50.9% were married-couple households, 13.8% were households with a male householder and no spouse or partner present, and 31.2% were households with a female householder and no spouse or partner present. About 34.8% of all households were made up of individuals and 21.5% had someone living alone who was 65 years of age or older.

There were 2,332 housing units, of which 14.9% were vacant. The homeowner vacancy rate was 1.5% and the rental vacancy rate was 5.7%.

Southport racial composition
Race	Number	Percentage
White (non-Hispanic)	3,422	86.17%
Black or African American (non-Hispanic)	286	7.2%
Native American	16	0.4%
Asian	24	0.6%
Pacific Islander	1	0.03%
Other/Mixed	116	2.92%
Hispanic or Latino	106	2.67%

=== 2000 census ===
As of the census of 2000, there were 2,351 people, 1,095 households, and 676 families residing in the city. The population density was 1,059.0 inhabitants per square mile (408.9/km^{2}). There were 1,292 housing units at an average density of 582.0 per square mile (224.7/km^{2}). The racial makeup of the city was 76.61% White, 21.78% African American, 0.43% Native American, 0.17% Asian, 0.09% Pacific Islander, 0.21% from other races, and 0.72% from two or more races. Hispanic or Latino of any race were 1.45% of the population.

There were 1,095 households, out of which 19.3% had children under the age of 18 living with them, 45.3% were married couples living together, 14.0% had a female householder with no husband present, and 38.2% were non-families. Of all households, 35.3% were made up of individuals, and 16.2% had someone living alone who was 65 years of age or older. The average household size was 2.08 and the average family size was 2.65.

In the city, the population was spread out, with 17.9% under the age of 18, 5.4% from 18 to 24, 21.0% from 25 to 44, 31.0% from 45 to 64, and 24.7% who were 65 years of age or older. The median age was 49 years. For every 100 females, there were 82.7 males. For every 100 females age 18 and over, there were 79.8 males.

The median income for a household in the city was $33,714, and the median income for a family was $45,714. Males had a median income of $34,167 versus $22,857 for females.

The per capita income for the city was $23,059. About 7.1% of families and 12.9% of the population were below the poverty line, including 19.1% of those under age 18 and 14.6% of those age 65 or over.

== Economy ==
Built in the 1970s on 1,200 acres (490 ha) at 20 feet (6.1 m) above sea level and about 5 miles (8.0 km) from the Atlantic Ocean near Southport, Duke Energy Carolinas operates the 1,870-megawatt Brunswick Nuclear Power Plant which has two nuclear reactors. This plant is the same generation and design as the Fukushima Daiichi plant in Japan. Following the Fukushima Daiichi nuclear meltdown, temporary flood prevention updates, called "cliff edge barriers" to make doors at the facility water tight, were installed at Brunswick to prevent flooding from Hurricane Florence from causing a disaster similar to Fukushima Daiichi. These temporary barriers are designed to stop flooding from a storm surge of up to 26 feet (7.9 m). On Thursday, September 13, 2018, before Hurricane Florence made landfall at Wrightsville Beach, Duke Energy shut down the first reactor in the early morning and the second reactor in the afternoon, approximately two hours before tropical storm-force winds at the plant.

== Media ==
The city is serviced by the newspaper The State Port Pilot. Radio stations WAZO/107.5 & WJSL-LP/100.7 are licensed to Southport.

The city of Southport has been the location the TV seriesRevenge and Under the Dome.Films made in Southport include I Know What You Did Last Summer, Summer Catch, Domestic Disturbance, Crimes of the Heart, Mary and Martha, Nights in Rodanthe, The Waterfront, A Walk to Remember and Safe Haven. Greedy People filming took place between May 9 and June 11, 2022.

== Education ==
The school district for the entire county is the Brunswick County Schools school district.

== Notable people ==
- Wanda G. Bryant (born 1956), judge of the North Carolina Court of Appeals
- Margaret Craighill (1898–1977), psychiatrist and the first female commissioned officer in the United States Army Medical Corps
- Abraham Galloway (1837–1870), freedman, freedom fighter, and member of the North Carolina Senate
- Peter Hans, president of the University of North Carolina
- Jean Heller, writer and investigative journalist
- Mike Johnson (born 1962), football player
- Quinton McCracken (born 1970), baseball player
- Henry Hamilton McCreary (1861–1921), member of the Florida Senate
- Bertha McNeil (1887–1979), civil rights activist, peace activist, and educator
- Bonner L. Stiller (born 1956), member of the North Carolina House of Representatives

== See also ==
- Dosher Memorial Hospital
