= Halifax Historic District =

Historic district in North Carolina, United States

- U.S. National Register of Historic Places
- U.S. Historic district
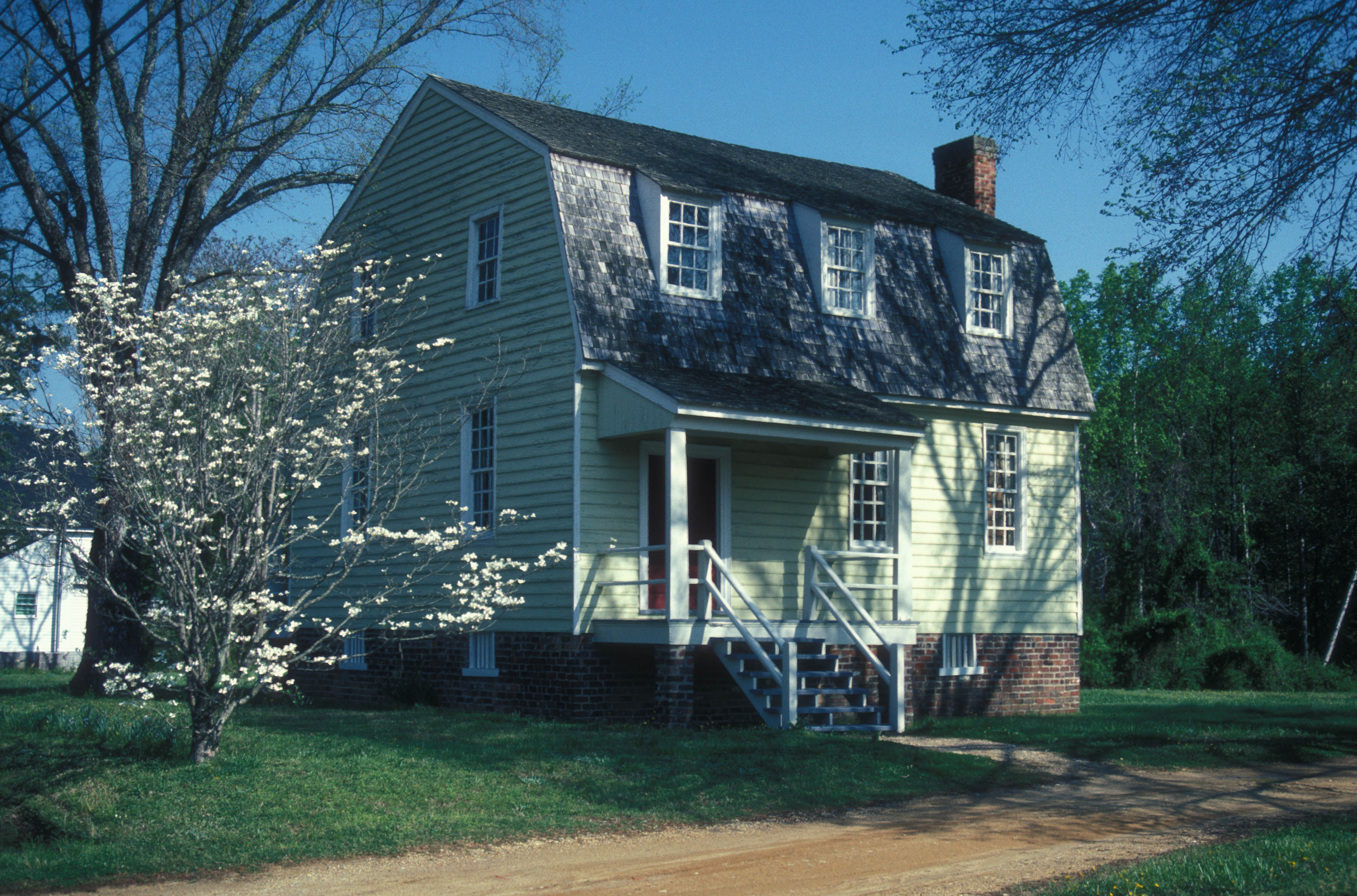
- Owens House, Halifax Historic District, July 1971

- Location within North Carolina Location within the United States
- Location: Roughly bounded by St. David St., Owens House Drainage Ditch, Roanoke River, and Magazine Spring Gut, Halifax, North Carolina
- Coordinates: 36°19′56″N 77°35′16″W
- Built: Beginning ca. 1760
- Built by: L. Wheeden & Co.
- Architect: Wheeler & Stern
- Architectural style: Mixed (more Than 2 Styles From Different Periods)
- NRHP reference No.: 70000456 (original); 10001128 (increase)

Significant dates
- Added to NRHP: January 21, 1970
- Boundary increase: January 14, 2011

Halifax Historic District is a national historic district located at Halifax, Halifax County, North Carolina, US that was listed on the National Register of Historic Places in 1970. It includes several buildings that are individually listed on the National Register. Halifax was the site of the signing of the Halifax Resolves on April 12, 1776, a set of resolutions of the North Carolina Provincial Congress which led to the United States Declaration of Independence gaining the support of North Carolina's delegates to the Second Continental Congress in that year.

Much of the district is also contained within a historic site operated by the North Carolina Division of State Historic Sites and Properties, an agency of the North Carolina Department of Natural and Cultural Resources.

The original Halifax Historic District encompassed four contributing buildings: the Constitution House (c. 1770), Owens House (c. 1760), Clerk's Office (c. 1832), and Jail (c. 1838). A 2010 boundary increase expanded the district to encompass 108 contributing buildings, 3 contributing sites, and 3 contributing structures. Located in the district are the separately listed Church of the Immaculate Conception and the Michael Ferrall Family Cemetery, the William R. Davie House, the Halifax County Courthouse, and St. Mark's Episcopal Church. Other notable buildings include the Royal White Hart Masonic Lodge #2 (c. 1820), Halifax Baptist Church (c. 1855), W. D. Faucett house (c. 1868), Walter Clark Law Office (1872), Roanoke Hotel (1905–1906), Halifax Hardware Company (c. 1915), and Vinson's Drug Store (c. 1917).

Along the Roanoke River, Halifax also acted as a hub in a maritime Underground Railroad for freedom seekers.
