= Hutchins Gordon Burton =

American politician

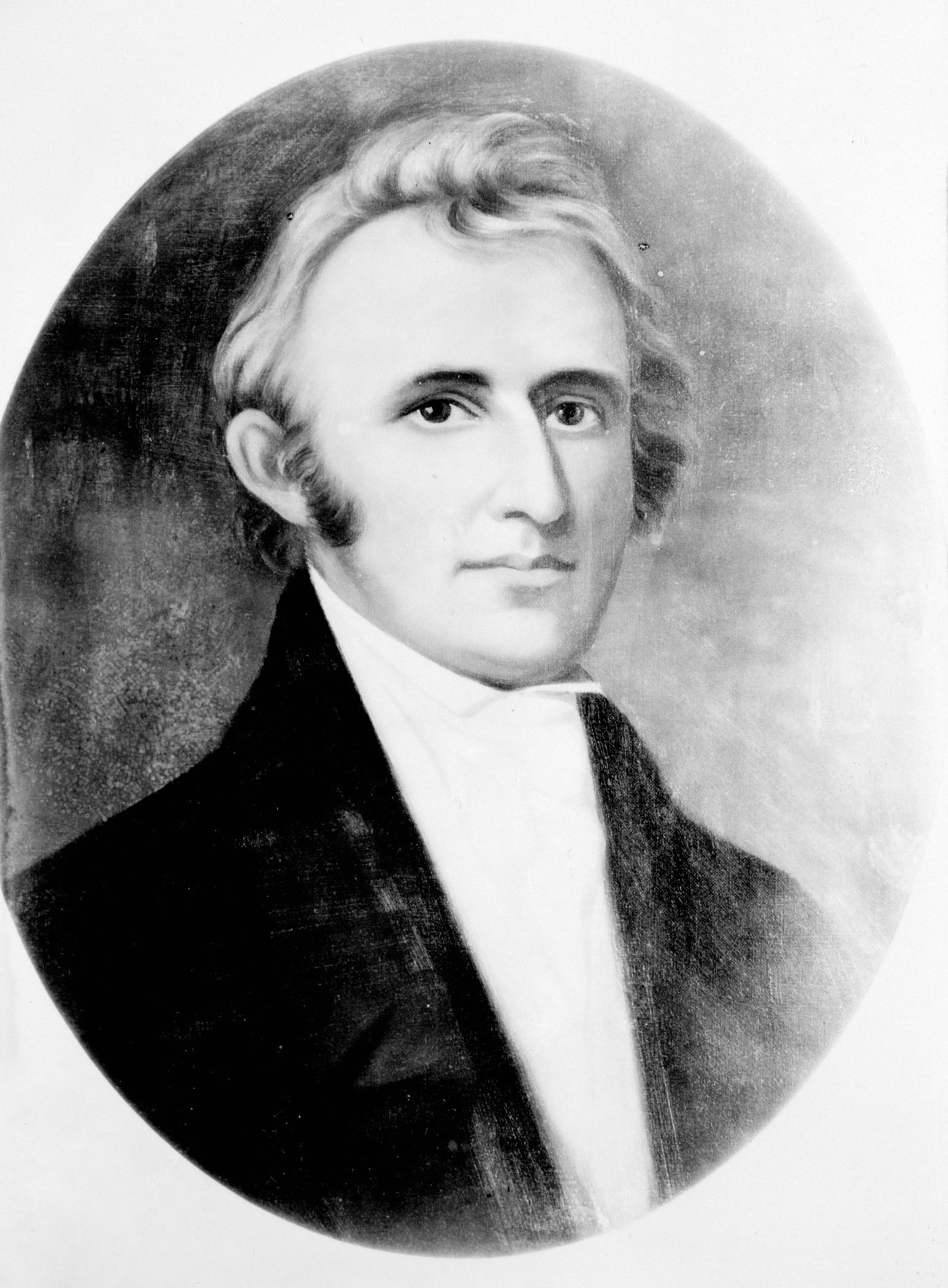

22nd Governor of North Carolina
- In office December 7, 1824 – December 8, 1827
- Preceded by: Gabriel Holmes
- Succeeded by: James Iredell, Jr.

Member of the U.S. House of Representatives from North Carolina's 2nd district
- In office December 6, 1819 – March 23, 1824
- Preceded by: Joseph H. Bryan
- Succeeded by: George Outlaw

Attorney General of North Carolina
- In office 1810–1816
- Governor: Benjamin Smith; William Hawkins; William Miller
- Preceded by: William Miller
- Succeeded by: William P. Drew

Personal details
- Born: 1774 Mecklenburg County, Virginia
- Died: April 21, 1836 (aged 61–62) Iredell County, North Carolina, US
- Party: None
- Spouse: Sarah Wales Jones Burton
- Children: 8

Hutchins Gordon Burton (1774 or 1782 – April 21, 1836) was the 22nd governor of the U.S. state of North Carolina from 1824 to 1827. Some sources indicate that he was not affiliated with any party at the time, although he was associated, according to other sources, with the Federalist Party and later with the National Republican Party.

There is some uncertainty as to the time and place of Burton's birth. Burton appears to have been born in Mecklenburg County, Virginia in 1774. However, some sources also give his birth year as 1782. Burton was sent to Granville County, North Carolina (now Vance County) to live with his uncle, Revolutionary War Colonel and politician Robert Burton, when his father died. Young Burton went on to practice law, serve in the North Carolina General Assembly, and be elected by that body as North Carolina Attorney General. He served as Attorney General from 1810 until his resignation in 1816.

Burton moved to Halifax Town in 1817 and practiced law. He was elected to the state House of Commons on August 14, 1817 and served a single one-year term. On August 12, 1819, Burton was elected to the United States House of Representatives for the term 1819–1821. He was supported both by the Federalists, who were strong in Halifax Town, and also by the Democratic-Republican Party. Burton was re-elected in 1821 and 1823. He resigned from Congress on March 23, 1824.

The North Carolina state legislature elected Burton the Governor of the state in 1824 and re-elected him in 1825 and 1826. During his term, President John Quincy Adams appointed him governor of Arkansas, but Burton was not confirmed by the United States Senate.

Burton died in 1836 while visiting relatives in Iredell County, North Carolina and is buried at Unity Presbyterian Church in Lincoln County, North Carolina.

== Ghost ==
The circumstances of Governor Burton's death have long been part of family oral tradition and North Carolina lore. As Armistead C. Gordon, Esq. recounts in Marguerite du Pont Lee's Virginia Ghosts and Others, "Among the historic homes in the old County and town of Halifax, N.C. is "Rocky Hill" the summer residence of Governor Hutchins G. Burton, a distinguished lawyer and statesman of the Revolutionary period, who married Sarah Wales Jones Burton, a daughter of Willie Jones, the famous Jeffersonian-Republican leader through whose efforts the adoption of the Federal Constitution was defeated in the Hillsboro Convention of North Carolina because it contained no Bill of Rights.

Governor Burton lived at "The Grove," the residence of his father-in-law, Willie Jones, in the town of Halifax where John Paul, the young Scotch sailor, spent some months prior to entering the American Navy at the beginning of the Revolution, and in honor of whose owners, Mr. and Mrs. Jones; he adopted the name of John Paul Jones.

Governor Burton and his family were staying at Rocky Hill in the spring of 1836, when he was called to Texas where he owned a large tract of land. Setting out by stage coach, he arrived at Salisbury in the western part of the State and stopped there on his way south to look after some business in court. Meeting his cousin Robert Burton of Lincoln County he went home with him to spend a few days. On the trip to Lincoln County he and his cousin visited the Wayside Inn and spent the night. Here he was taken ill and died within twenty-four hours, April 21, 1836 at age 61.

His wife, Sarah "Sallie" Welsh Jones Burton, had been on a visit and was returning to Rocky Hill about dusk in her carriage driven by her servant William and accompanied by an infant grandchild and a nurse. As they approached the house which is situated on a high hill she and William saw Governor Burton coming down the hill on a white horse which he usually rode. Her attention was distracted momentarily by the crying of the child and when she looked again expecting her husband to speak as he approached the carriage both rider and horse had vanished.

On account of the slow mail facilities of the time, Mrs. Burton did not hear of the Governor's death until three weeks after it occurred, and she then learned that he had died at the very hour when the apparition had appeared to her and her carriage driver.

Rocky Hill which is situated near Ringwood in Halifax County was still standing in 1918 and was then owned by Mr. S. Harrison. The story of Governor Burton's apparition is well authenticated and has persisted in Halifax County for nearly a hundred years.

He was buried in Unity Churchyard, Lincoln County."

Legal offices
Preceded by William Miller	Attorney General of North Carolina; 1810–1816	Succeeded by William P. Drew
Political offices
Preceded by Gabriel Holmes	Governor of North Carolina; 1824–1827	Succeeded by James Iredell, Jr.
U.S. House of Representatives
Preceded by Joseph H. Bryan	Member of the U.S. House of Representatives from North Carolina's 2nd congressional district 1819–1824	Succeeded by George Outlaw
