= Willie Jones (statesman) =

American politician

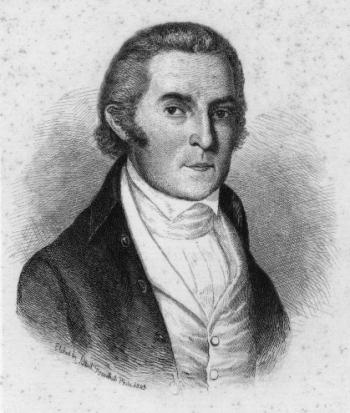
- Born: May 25, 1741; Surry County, Virginia
- Died: June 18, 1801 (aged 60); Raleigh, North Carolina
- Occupations: Planter and statesman
- Political party: Whig, Anti-Federalist
- Spouse: Mary Montfort
- Children: 13 (including Sarah Wales Jones Burton)

Willie Jones (pronounced Wiley Jones, May 25, 1741 – June 18, 1801) was an American planter and statesman from Halifax County, North Carolina. He represented North Carolina as a delegate to the Continental Congress in 1780. His brother Allen Jones was also a delegate to the congress.

In 1774, 1775 and 1776, Jones was elected to represent either the county of Halifax or the town of Halifax in the North Carolina Provincial Congress. For a brief time in 1776, as the head of North Carolina's centralized Council of Safety, he was the head of the state's revolutionary government. Richard Caswell took over after being elected as governor.

Thereafter, Jones was elected to the North Carolina House of Commons and the North Carolina Senate. He was elected to the United States Constitutional Convention in 1787 but declined to accept his seat. He led the faction that opposed North Carolina's ratification of the Constitution in 1788 because he feared that the national government would be too powerful.

Among his last public roles was helping to determine the site for the new state capital in 1791, which was named Raleigh. He moved to Raleigh and lived there until his death in 1801. He was buried in an unmarked grave on ground that is now occupied by St. Augustine's College.

Jones Street in Raleigh, where the North Carolina General Assembly building is located, is named for him, as is Jones County in the state.

== Early life and education ==
Willie Jones, revolutionary leader and "Father of Jeffersonian Democracy in North Carolina," was born in Surry County, Virginia, May 25, 1741, the son of wealthy planter Robin Jones, Jr., and Sarah (Cobb) Jones. He was named for one of his godfathers, the Reverend William Willie of Albemarle Parish, Virginia. Sometime prior to 1753, the Joneses moved to Northampton County, North Carolina, settling about six miles from the town of Halifax.

At the age of 12, Jones sailed to England to attend his father's alma mater, Eton, where he studied from 1753 to 1758. Afterward he made the Grand Tour of the Continent. When he returned to Halifax, Jones was described as a 'peculiarly thoughtful and eccentric man.'

== Political career ==
Between 1774 and 1775, Jones completely reversed his attitude about England's relationship to the colonies and became a convert to the Whig cause. Historians have long speculated as to why he changed his views. While an aristocrat in social life, Jones fervently believed in political democracy. He interpreted the struggle with Great Britain as a democratic movement and was determined to embody its revolutionary ideals in the government of the state and nation. His later opposition to the United States Constitution was inspired by his fear of a national government that might become too powerful.

From the beginning of the quarrel with England, Jones was an ardent supporter of colonial rights; his enthusiasm drew him into politics. In 1774 he was recommended by the Board of Trade for a place on the colonial council but was not appointed because of his radical views. He served instead as chairman of the Halifax Committee of Safety. He supported the call for a provincial congress in 1774. This body remained in session for only three days, but during that time it fully launched North Carolina into the revolutionary movement.

Jones was elected a member of each of the five provincial congresses, but he could not attend the fourth because the Continental Congress had appointed him superintendent of Indian affairs for the southern colonies. After a fifth provincial congress, with a liberal majority behind him, Jones served on the committee to draft the state constitution and bill of rights. He used his influence in shaping the state constitution. When it was completed, it was a compromise satisfactory to all but the conservative extremists.

During the next twelve years, Jones was politically the most powerful man in the state. He was a member of the House of Commons from 1777 to 1780, and a state senator for three terms between 1782 and 1788. In 1781 and 1787 he was a member of the Council of State, a centralized organization that governed until the state government was elected. In 1780 he was elected to the Continental Congress and served one year.

Jones was elected as a delegate to the federal Convention, but did not accept. When the Constitution was submitted to the state, he led the opposition to its ratification at the Hillsborough Convention of 1788. At this convention he wanted to adjourn the first day. He said, 'all the delegates knew how they were going to vote,' and he did not want to be guilty of 'lavishing public money' on a long and tedious discussion in support of the Constitution and its ratification, in advance of amendment. After eleven days of debate, by a vote of 184 to 84, the Anti-Federalists carried a resolution neither rejecting nor ratifying the Constitution.

Jones favored a delay in ratification, but public sentiment ran the other way. The Federalists campaigned effectively to gain a second convention to act on the Constitution. Jones was elected to the Convention of 1789 but did not attend. It met in Fayetteville and ratified the Constitution by a vote of 195 to 77. His public career was over.

== Family ==
On June 22, 1776, forsaking an earlier vow of celibacy, at age 25 he married Mary Montfort, daughter of Colonel Joseph Montfort, who had been appointed by the Duke of Beaufort as the first and only "Grand Master of Masons of and for America". The couple had thirteen children, only five of whom lived to adulthood. Of those who did, two were sons and both died unmarried. Their three daughters were:

- Anna Maria, married Joseph B. Littlejohn
- Martha Burke ("Patsy"), married John Wayles Eppes, U.S. congressman and then senator, widower of Thomas Jefferson's daughter Maria
- Sally, married, first, Hutchins Gordon Burton, U.S. congressman and later governor of North Carolina; and second, Andrew Joyner

Jones's home, the Grove, which he built at the southern end of the town of Halifax, became a center of social life and political activity for the region. He had an extensive plantation, owned numerous well-bred horses, and was considered to have one of the finest stables in the South. By 1790 he held 120 slaves. This was a large number in the Upper South, where men were classified as planters if they held 20 or more slaves.

== Death ==
Jones died in Raleigh after a long illness on June 18, 1801. At his own request, he was buried there in an unmarked grave. In his will, he asked that he be buried beside one of his small daughters, and further mandated that "No priest or other person is to insult my corpse by uttering any impious observations over my body. Let it be covered sunny and warm and there is an end. My family and my friends are not to mourn my death, even with a black rag — on the contrary, I give my wife and three daughters, Anna Maria, Sally and Patsy, each a Quaker-colored silk, to make their habits [hoods, bonnets] on the occasion."

== Legacy and honors ==
- The young Scotsman John Paul came to the United States after the death of his brother. Shown generous hospitality by Willie Jones and his wife, the young man adopted the surname Jones. He became well known as John Paul Jones.
- Jones Street in Raleigh, where the General Assembly building is located, was named for him.
- Jones County, North Carolina was named for him.
- Jonesborough, Tennessee, was named for him.

Preceded by Samuel Ashe	President of the North Carolina Council of Safety; 1776	Succeeded by Governor of North Carolina; Richard Caswell
