= John Hall (judge) =

American judge

Associate Justice of the Supreme Court of North Carolina
- In office 1819–1832
- Preceded by: Office established
- Succeeded by: Joseph J. Daniel

Grand Master of the Grand Lodge of North Carolina and Tennessee
- In office December 12, 1805 – December 16, 1808
- Preceded by: John L. Taylor
- Succeeded by: Benjamin Smith

Personal details
- Born: May 31, 1767 Staunton, Virginia
- Died: January 29, 1833 (aged 65) Warrenton, North Carolina
- Education: College of William and Mary

John Hall (May 31, 1767 – January 29, 1833) was an American jurist who served as an associate justice of the Supreme Court of North Carolina from 1819 to 1832.

== Biography ==
John Hall was elected by the North Carolina General Assembly to the court in 1818 and served on that court from its first meeting in January 1819 until his declining health led him to retire in 1832. A Staunton, Virginia, native and alumnus of the College of William and Mary, Hall moved to Warrenton, North Carolina to practice law and served as a state superior court judge from 1800 to 1818.

Masonic offices
Preceded by John L. Taylor	Grand Master of the Grand Lodge of North Carolina and Tennessee; 1805–1808	Succeeded by Benjamin Smith
Legal offices
Preceded by New office	Associate Justice of the Supreme Court of North Carolina; 1819–1832	Succeeded by Joseph J. Daniel
