= Sarah Wales Jones Burton =

First Lady of North Carolina (1824–1827)

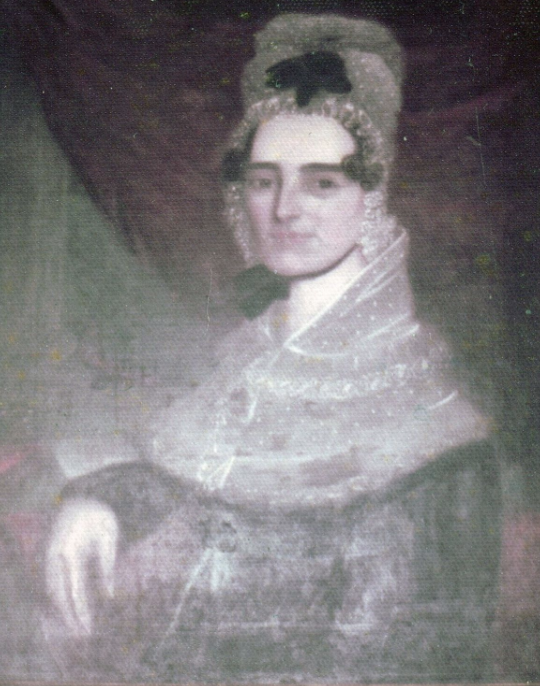

First Lady of North Carolina
- In office December 7, 1824 – December 8, 1827
- Governor: Hutchins Gordon Burton
- Preceded by: Mary Smith Hunter Holmes
- Succeeded by: Frances Johnston Treadwell Iredell

Personal details
- Born: Sarah Wales Jones; October 19, 1791 Halifax, North Carolina, U.S.
- Died: January 24, 1872 (aged 80) Weldon, North Carolina, U.S.
- Spouse(s): Hutchins Gordon Burton (1812–1836; his death); Andrew Joyner
- Children: 8
- Parent(s): Willie Jones (father); Mary Montfort (mother)
- Relatives: Joseph Montfort (grandfather); John Wayles Eppes (brother-in-law)

Sarah Wales Jones Burton Joyner (Note: Some records show her name as Sarah Welch Jones Burton or Sally Welsh Jones Burton) (October 19, 1791 – January 24, 1872) was an American society hostess who served as First Lady of North Carolina from 1824 to 1827 as the wife of Governor Hutchins Gordon Burton. During her husband's administration, she hosted Gilbert du Motier, Marquis de Lafayette and Senator Martin Van Buren in North Carolina. After becoming a widow in 1836, she married a second time to the planter Andrew Joyner.

== Early life and family ==
Burton was born Sarah Wales Jones on October 19, 1781 to Willie Jones and Mary Montfort at "The Grove", their large plantation in Halifax, North Carolina. Her father was an American Revolutionary patriot, statesman, and wealthy planter. Her mother was the daughter of planter and Masonic Grand Master Joseph Montfort. Burton's sister, Mary Burke "Patsy" Jones, was the wife of U.S. Senator John Wayles Eppes. Burton grew up at "The Grove" and was one of thirteen children.

== Marriages and public life ==
In 1812, she married Hutchins Gordon Burton, the Attorney General of North Carolina and a former member of the North Carolina House of Commons. The couple lived together at her family's plantation in Halifax, and they had eight children:

- Robert Allen Burton (1814-1840)
- Hutchins Gordon Burton (1817-1822)
- Willie Jones Burton (1820-1824)
- Mary Elizabeth Burton Alston (1822-1909)
- Martha Ann Burton Williams (1825-1888)
- John Wayles Burton (1826-1845)
- Sallie Blount Edwards Burton Long (1828-1888)
- Thomas Burke Burton (1831-1861)

Burton's husband served as a U.S. Congressman from 1820 to 1824, when he resigned from office in order to serve as Governor of North Carolina. During her husband's gubernatorial administration, from December 7, 1824 to December 8, 1827, she served as the First Lady of North Carolina. The couple hosted many influential guests who visited the state, including Gilbert du Motier, Marquis de Lafayette in 1825 and Senator Martin Van Buren in 1827.

Following her husband's death in 1826, Burton married a second time to Lieutenant Colonel Andrew Joyner of Poplar Grove Plantation in Weldon, North Carolina.

Burton died in 1872.
