= Calvin Jones (physician) =

American politician

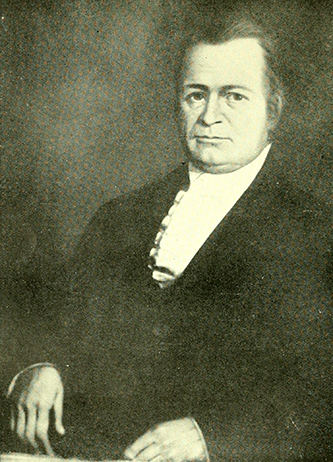

Grand Master of the Grand Lodge of North Carolina
- In office December 8, 1817 – December 16, 1820
- Preceded by: John L. Taylor
- Succeeded by: John A. Cameron

3rd Adjutant General of North Carolina
- In office 1808 – 1812
- Appointed by: David Stone
- Preceded by: Edward Pasteur
- Succeeded by: Robert Williams

4th Intendant of Police of Raleigh, North Carolina
- In office 1807 – 1809
- Preceded by: William Hill
- Succeeded by: John Marshall

Personal details
- Born: April 2, 1775 Great Barrington, Massachusetts Bay
- Died: September 20, 1846 (aged 71) Bolivar, Tennessee

Military service
- Allegiance: United States
- Branch: North Carolina Militia
- Rank: Major-General
- Commands: Seventh Militia Division
- Wars: Quasi-War; War of 1812

Calvin Jones (April 2, 1775 – September 20, 1846) was an American medical doctor and politician who served as the Intendant of Police of Raleigh, North Carolina (present day Mayor of Raleigh, North Carolina) from 1807 to 1809. Previously, he served in the North Carolina House of Commons as the representative for Johnston County from 1799 to 1802 and Wake County in 1807. During the War of 1812; he commanded the state's seventh militia division, having previously served as the adjutant general of North Carolina.

Jones also helped found the North Carolina Medical Society, served as a trustee of the University of North Carolina from 1802 to 1832 and the Grand Master of the Grand Lodge of North Carolina from 1817 to 1820. He claimed to know Andrew Jackson and the first lady "very well personally" in a letter he wrote to a cousin in 1828.

== Early life and education ==
Calvin Jones was born on April 2, 1775, in Great Barrington, Massachusetts Bay, to Ebenezer and Susannah (née Blackmore) Jones. His father was a soldier in the American Revolution. He received his medical license in 1792, and then moved to Smithfield, North Carolina in 1795.

Jones was elected to the North Carolina House of Commons twice from Johnston County, once in 1799 and again in 1802. He was the first physician in North Carolina to practice the inoculation of smallpox. He was a founder of the North Carolina Medical Society in 1799 and a trustee of the University of North Carolina from 1802 to 1832.

In 1803, Jones moved from Smithfield to Raleigh. He served in the House of Commons for Wake County in 1807, and was elected Intendant of Police of Raleigh, North Carolina the same year. In 1808, he became an editor with the Raleigh Star, an early local newspaper. He sold his shares to his partner, Thomas Henderson, in 1815.

== Military service ==
In 1798, Jones served in the Johnston Regiment, North Carolina Militia. The regiment received a signed letter from President John Adams in 1798, thanking them for their preparedness to serve during the Quasi-War. After the Chesapeake–Leopard affair in 1807, President Thomas Jefferson called for 7,003 troops from North Carolina. Jones, now a captain, organized the Wake Troop of Cavalry. After the troops were deemed unnecessary, he continued to train them. His efforts were recognized when he was appointed adjutant general of North Carolina in 1808.

After the War of 1812 broke out, Jones was given command of the seventh militia division and promoted to the rank of major-general of North Carolina Militia. When the Royal Navy attacked Portsmouth and Ocracoke Island with a 74-gun man-of-war, six frigates, two privateers, two schooners, and up to 70 smaller vessels in July 1813, he and his North Carolina militia mustered enough force to send the British landing party off after five days of raids.

== Later life ==
In 1820, Jones relocated out of Raleigh to what is now Wake Forest, to a 615-acre (2.49 km^{2}) plantation which later gave its name to the surrounding town. He was postmaster of the small village that soon surrounded his land. The property was purchased by the North Carolina Baptist Convention in 1832 and became the first home of Wake Forest College. Wake Forest was part of an envisioned network of plantations across the South, including his second farm in Bolivar, Tennessee, named "Pontine", supposedly for the Pontine Marshes near Rome, or perhaps, for the pons network of the brain, representing his idea of network of plantations. After the sale of Wake Forest, Jones moved to Bolivar, where he died in 1846.

== Personal life ==
Jones was first engaged to Ruina J. Williams, daughter of Major William Williams of Franklin County. Ten years after she died in 1809, Jones married her sister, Temperance Boddie Jones, widow of Thomas Jones of Warrenton. Their children were:

- Montezuma Jones (1819 – 1922), married Elizabeth Wood.
- Octavia Rowena Jones (1826 – 1917), married Edwin Polk.
- Paul Tudor Jones (1828 – 1904), married first Jane M. Wood and second Mary Kirkman.

Of the known portraits of Jones, one is held at the Historical House and the other is in Dallas with his descendants.

== Legacy ==
The main dwelling on his Wake Forest plantation, built circa 1820, is now a museum for the Wake Forest College Birthplace Society. The museum is known as the Dr. Calvin Jones House, and features exhibits about the history of Wake Forest College and the town of Wake Forest, including the Wake Forest College Sports Hall of Fame. The Society also maintains historic archives about the college and town that are available to researchers by appointment. In 2016, the house was listed on the National Register of Historic Places.

A highway in the Wake Forest area, the N.C. 98 Bypass, was renamed in his honor in 2010.

Political offices
Preceded by William Hill	Intendant of Police of Raleigh, North Carolina; 1807–1809	Succeeded by John Marshall
Military offices
Preceded by Edward Pasteur	Adjutant General of North Carolina; 1808–1812	Succeeded by Robert Williams
Masonic offices
Preceded by John L. Taylor	Grand Master of the Grand Lodge of North Carolina; 1817–1820	Succeeded by John A. Cameron
