= John Louis Taylor =

American judge

1st Chief Justice of North Carolina
- In office January 1, 1819 – January 29, 1829
- Preceded by: Office established
- Succeeded by: Leonard Henderson

Grand Master of the Grand Lodge of North Carolina
- In office November 26, 1814 – December 8, 1817
- Preceded by: Robert Williams (as Grand Master of the Grand Lodge of North Carolina and Tennessee)
- Succeeded by: Calvin Jones

Grand Master of the Grand Lodge of North Carolina and Tennessee
- In office December 12, 1802 – December 12, 1805
- Preceded by: William Polk
- Succeeded by: John Hall

Personal details
- Born: March 1, 1769 London, England
- Died: January 29, 1829 (aged 59) Raleigh, North Carolina
- Resting place: Oakwood Cemetery, Raleigh, North Carolina
- Education: College of William and Mary, read law under George Wythe
- Occupation: Jurist, politician

John Louis Taylor (March 1, 1769 – January 29, 1829) was an American jurist who served as the first chief justice of North Carolina from 1819 to 1829.

== Early life and education ==
Born in London, England, he is the only foreign-born Chief Justice in state history. He was brought to America at the age of 12 and attended the College of William & Mary.

== Career ==
Taylor was elected to represent Fayetteville, North Carolina in the North Carolina House of Commons in 1792, 1794 and 1795. He became a state Superior Court judge in 1798 and turned over most of his law practice to his brother-in-law, young William Gaston, who later became a North Carolina Supreme Court judge and U.S. Congressman.

Before 1818, several North Carolina Superior Court judges met en banc twice each year, to review appeals and disputes from their own trial courts. This was eventually called the "Supreme Court". He sat as part of this Court often and in 1810 was chosen as its chief justice. When the North Carolina General Assembly decided to create a full-time, distinct Supreme Court in 1818, the legislators chose three men to make up the new Court: Taylor, Leonard Henderson, and John Hall. The three met and elected Taylor to once again assume his title of chief justice.

Taylor served on the Court until his death, near Raleigh, in 1829. He is buried in Oakwood Cemetery. Elmwood, his home at Raleigh, was listed on the National Register of Historic Places in 1975.

== Personal life ==
Taylor was a prominent Freemason and served as Grand Senior Warden of North Carolina, while William R. Davie was Grand Master, and he himself served as Grand Master from 1802 to 1804 and from 1814 to 1817. He was a member of Phoenix Lodge No. 8, A.F. & A.M., Fayetteville, North Carolina.

Taylor's namesake grandson, John L. T. Sneed, served as a justice of the Tennessee Supreme Court.

== Selected works ==
- The North Carolina Law Repository (two volumes, 1814–16)
- Term Reports (1818)
- On the Duties of Executors and Administrators (1825)

Masonic offices
Preceded by William Polk	Grand Master of the Grand Lodge of North Carolina and Tennessee; 1802–1805	Succeeded by John Hall
Preceded by Robert Williams as Grand Master of the Grand Lodge of North Carolina and Tennessee	Grand Master of the Grand Lodge of North Carolina; 1811–1813	Succeeded by Calvin Jones
Legal offices
Preceded by New office	Chief Justice of North Carolina; 1818 - 1829	Succeeded by Leonard Henderson
