= Sally-Billy House =

Historic house in North Carolina, United States

- U.S. National Register of Historic Places
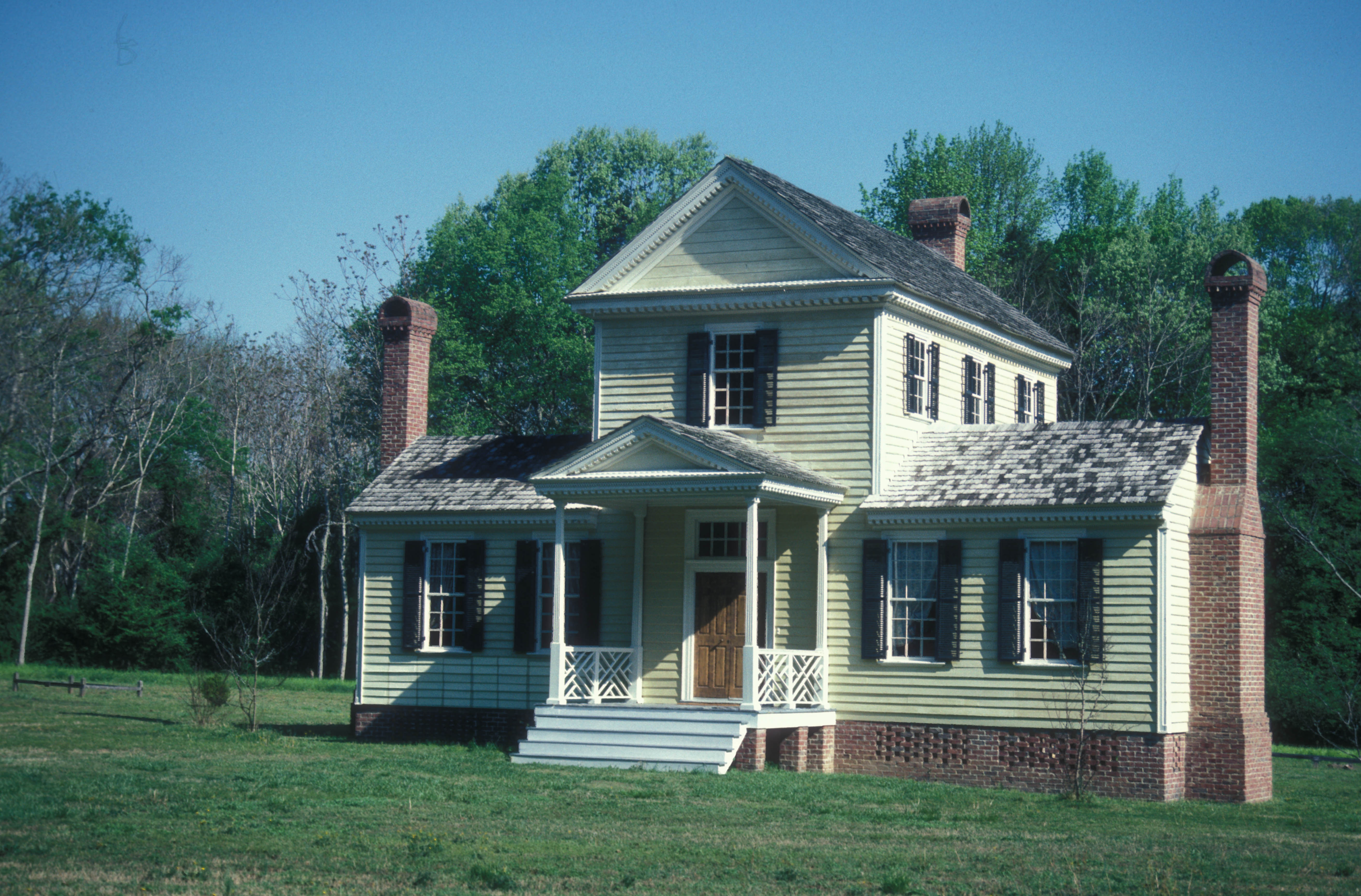
- Sally-Billy House, July 1971

- Location within North Carolina Location within the United States
- Location: St. Andrews St. extended, Halifax, North Carolina
- Coordinates: 36°19′49″N 77°35′7″W
- Area: 2 acres (0.81 ha)
- Built: c. 1804
- NRHP reference No.: 73001350
- Added to NRHP: February 8, 1973

Sally-Billy House is a historic plantation house located at Halifax, Halifax County, North Carolina. It was built about 1804, and consists of a two-story, one bay, pedimented central block flanked by two-bay one-story wings. The frame dwelling is sheathed in weatherboard. The house was moved to its present location in December 1974.

It was listed on the National Register of Historic Places in 1973.
