= Provincial Grand Master =

Leadership rank in Freemasonry

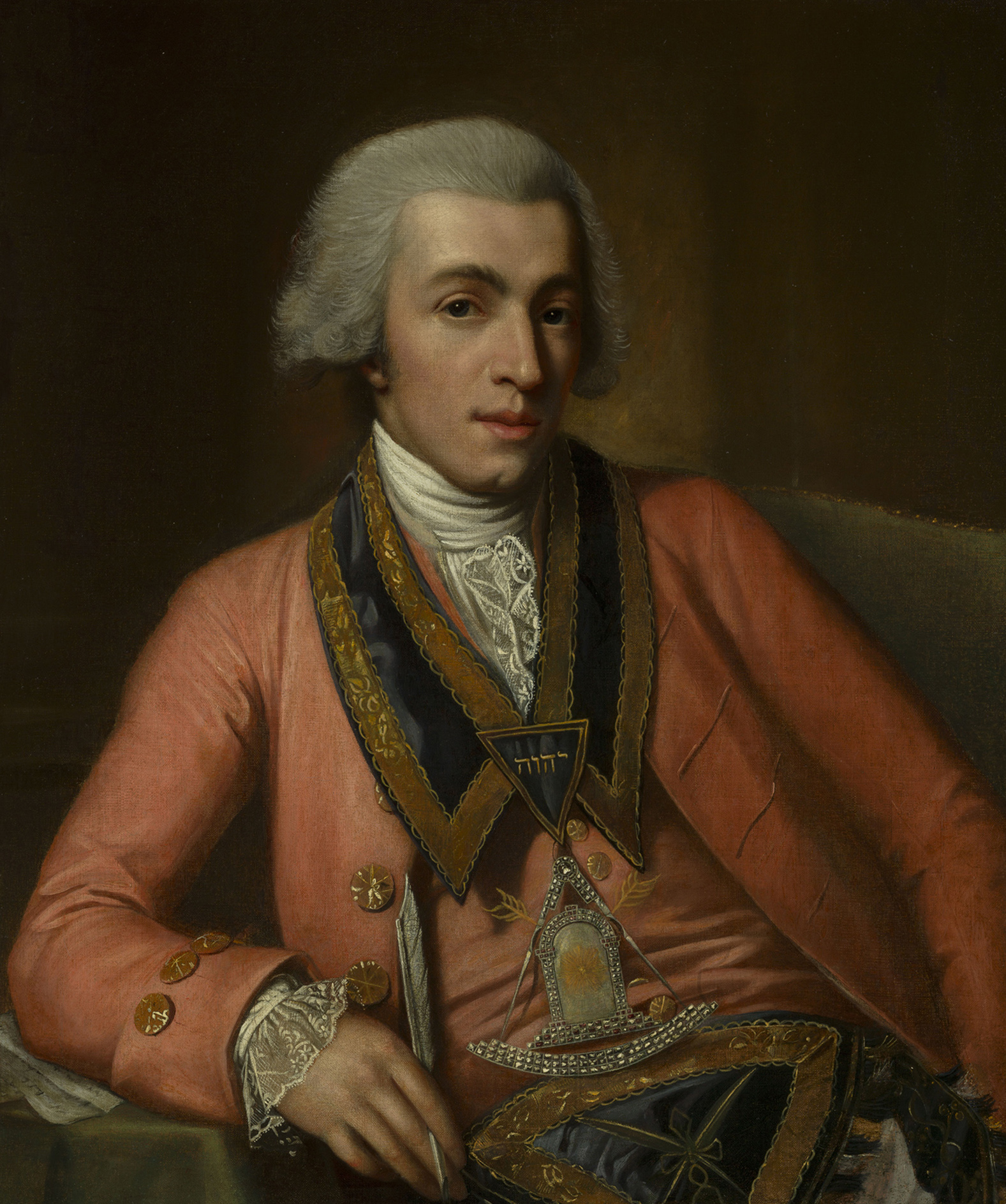
Joseph Montfort, Provincial Grand Master of and for America, in 1771

Provincial Grand Master (abbreviated PGM, PrGM or ProvGM, although the latter is preferred to avoid confusion with Past Grand Master), sometimes called District Grand Master or Metropolitan Grand Master, is a fraternal office held by the head of a Provincial Grand Lodge, who is directly appointed by the organisation's Grand Master.

== Freemasonry ==
Freemasonry's first Grand Lodge was formed in London in 1717 by four private Lodges meeting in that city; all of the first private lodges warranted by it were within easy communicating distance of London. As lodges became more distant an intermediate level of administration became necessary. The very first Provincial Grand Master was appointed for Cheshire in 1725.

There are now Provinces (with Provincial Grand Masters) under the Grand Lodge of Ireland, the National Grand Lodge of France, and the Grand Lodge of Scotland, for example. However, not all Masonic jurisdictions have Provinces or Provincial Grand Masters.

Under the United Grand Lodge of England, three terms now exist for this intermediate level of administration. In the counties of England and Wales there are Provinces, each headed by a Provincial Grand Master. In overseas territories under the Grand Lodge's jurisdiction, the equivalent unit is called a District, headed by a District Grand Master. Since 2002 the facility has also existed to create an equivalent layer of administration and management in any urban conglomeration, to be known as a Metropolitan Area, and headed by a Metropolitan Grand Master. The only such Metropolitan Area so far created is that of London. Similarly, the Grand Lodge of Ireland has a Metropolitan Area of Dublin, and the Grand Lodge of Scotland has Provinces at home, but Districts overseas. All Provincial Grand Masters, District Grand Masters, and Metropolitan Grand Masters hold a patent of appointment from their nation's Grand Master, by which he delegates to them the authority to govern his private lodges within their respective Province, District, or Metropolitan Area.

== Other fraternal groups ==
The same offices are also found historically within the Orange Order.

A later organization, which in part mimics the hierarchical structure of the Masons, is the Oddfellows. In the Manchester Unity (a leading branch of the organisation) a Provincial Grand Master holds an office between local Lodge and National level.

== See also ==
- Provincial Grand Lodges (UGLE)
- Grand Master (Freemasonry)
