= Robert Williams (Mississippi politician) =

American politician (1773–1836)

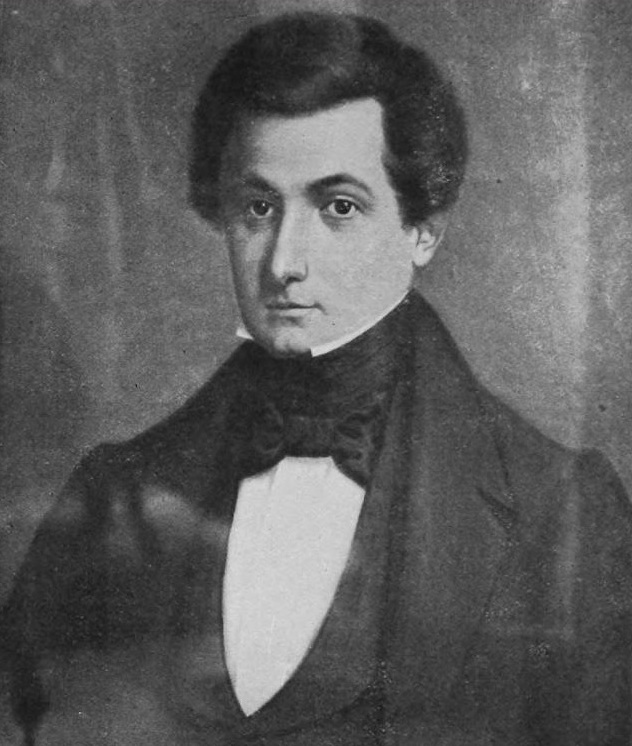

4th Adjutant General of North Carolina
- In office 1812–1821
- Appointed by: William Hawkins
- Preceded by: Calvin Jones
- Succeeded by: Beverly Daniel

Grand Master of the Grand Lodge of North Carolina and Tennessee
- In office November 29, 1811 – November 26, 1814
- Preceded by: Benjamin Smith
- Succeeded by: John L. Taylor (as Grand Master of the Grand Lodge of North Carolina)

3rd Governor of the Mississippi Territory
- In office March 1, 1805 – March 7, 1809
- President: Thomas Jefferson
- Preceded by: William C. C. Claiborne
- Succeeded by: David Holmes

Member of the U.S. House of Representatives from North Carolina's 3rd district
- In office March 4, 1797 – March 3, 1803
- Preceded by: Jesse Franklin
- Succeeded by: William Kennedy

Personal details
- Born: July 12, 1773 Surry County, North Carolina, US
- Died: January 25, 1836 (aged 62) Ouachita Parish, Louisiana, US
- Resting place: Ouachita Parish, Louisiana, US
- Party: Democratic-Republican
- Spouse: Elizabeth Winston (m. 1790; died 1814)

Military service
- Allegiance: United States
- Branch: North Carolina Militia
- Rank: Brigadier-General
- Wars: War of 1812

Robert Williams (July 12, 1773 – January 25, 1836) was an American politician who served as the fourth adjutant general of North Carolina from 1812 to 1821. A member of the Democratic-Republican Party, he previously served as the third governor of Mississippi Territory from 1805 to 1809 under President Thomas Jefferson and represented North Carolina in the U.S. House of Representatives from 1797 to 1803.

== Early life and education ==
Robert Williams was born was born on July 12, 1773, in Surry County, North Carolina, where his family had significant political power. Since no public schools existed at the time, he received a private education appropriate to his class. He read law, and was admitted to the North Carolina bar.

== Early career ==
In 1796, although barely legal age, Williams was elected as a Democratic-Republican to the U.S. House of Representatives, and he served three terms, 1797 to 1803. In 1803 President Thomas Jefferson appointed Williams to the federal commission empowered to determine the legitimacy of land claims in the recently acquired Mississippi Territory. In May 1805 Jefferson appointed him governor, and he served until the end of Jefferson's term in March 1809. During the War of 1812, he served in the militia as the adjutant general of North Carolina.

== Later life and death ==
After the 1814 death of his wife in Washington, Mississippi, Williams moved to a plantation near Monroe, Louisiana, which he called Bon Aire. He operated Bon Aire until his death in Ouachita Parish, Louisiana, on January 25, 1836. He was buried at Bon Aire, but the exact location of the grave is not known. It is the present-day site of the Baptist Children's Home and Sellers Baptist Maternity Home in Monroe.

== Personal life ==
Williams' brother Lewis served as a Congressman from North Carolina, and his brother John served in the United States Senate from Tennessee. Brother Thomas Lanier Williams was a Tennessee judge and state senator. His cousin Marmaduke Williams also represented North Carolina in the U.S. House.

U.S. House of Representatives
Preceded by Jesse Franklin	Member of the United States House of Representatives from North Carolina's 3rd congressional district 1797–1803	Succeeded by William Kennedy
Political offices
Preceded by William C. C. Claiborne	Governor of Mississippi Territory; 1805–1809	Succeeded by David Holmes
Masonic offices
Preceded by Benjamin Smith	Grand Master of the Grand Lodge of North Carolina and Tennessee; 1811–1814	Succeeded by John L. Taylor as Grand Master of the Grand Lodge of North Carolina
Military offices
Preceded by Calvin Jones	Adjutant General of North Carolina; 1812–1821	Succeeded by Beverly Daniel
