= Lucille Gorham =

American civil rights activist (1931–2012)

- Born: January 18, 1931; Halifax, North Carolina, U.S.
- Died: November 3, 2012 (aged 81)
- Education: Sojourner-Douglass College
- Occupations: Civil rights activist; community leader
- Known for: Neighborhood activism in Baltimore, community housing leadership

Lucille Gorham (January 18, 1931 – November 3, 2012) was a civil rights activist in Baltimore communities during the Civil Rights Movement. Born Lucille Alexander in Halifax, North Carolina, Gorham moved to Baltimore in 1934 and resided a community in East Baltimore. She attended city public schools and later earned a GED, as well as studying at Sojourner Douglass College. Gorham lived a quiet life as a homemaker until 1967, when she became the president of Citizens for Fair Housing, a neighborhood association founded in response to the city's urban renewal plan. She soon led a successful community-owned and operated housing complex built on Madison Park Square between Caroline and Eden streets. She went on to become the director of the Madison Square Housing Association, director of the Middle East Community, and the leader of a neighborhood 4-H Club.

The Baltimore riot of 1968 resulting from the assassination of Martin Luther King Jr. propelled Gorham's role in neighborhood activism. In August 1968, Gorham began to operate "Our House," clubhouse that offered services to the community including home-cooked meals, a place for local children to spend their Saturday evenings, and a spot for senior citizens to meet with friends.

Later in life, Gorham fought against the expansion of the Johns Hopkins Hospital medical complex in 2002. As a result of the expansion, Gorham was forced out of her home in the Middle East neighborhood of East Baltimore and moved to a home in the Belair-Edison neighborhood of Northeast Baltimore. Gorham died at 81 years old from a battle with cancer.
