= Benjamin Smith (North Carolina politician) =

Governor of North Carolina (1756–1826)

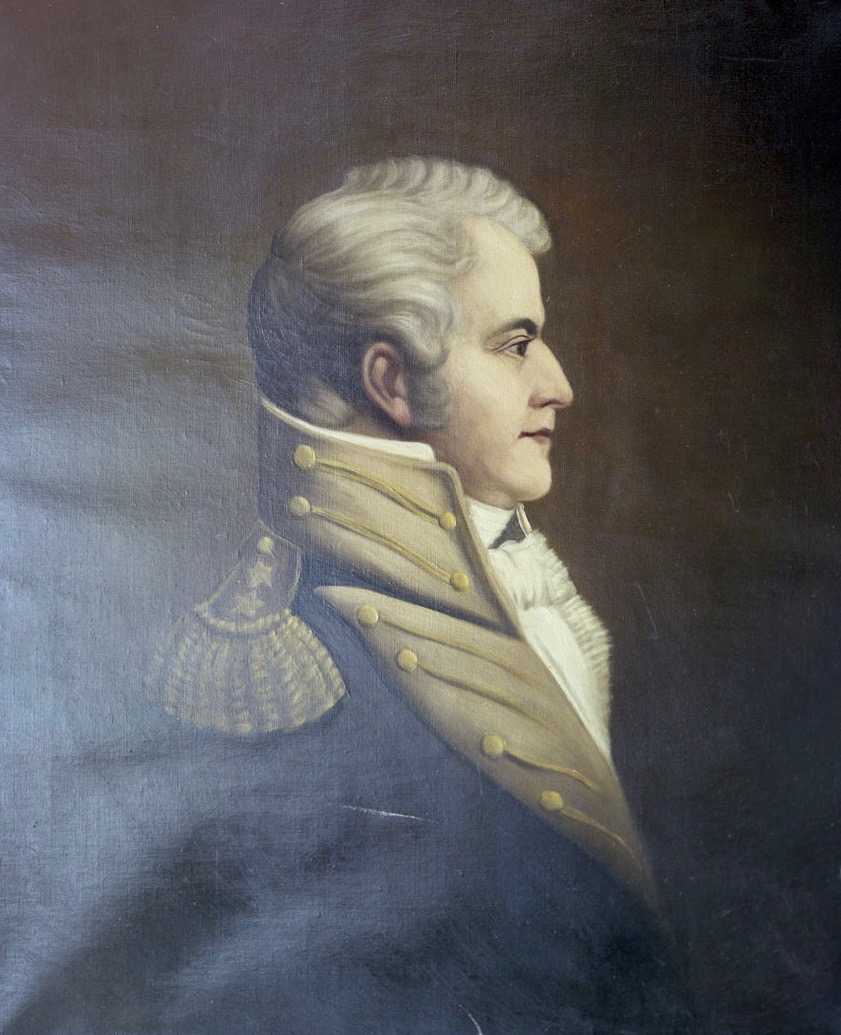

16th Governor of North Carolina
- In office December 1, 1810 – December 11, 1811
- Preceded by: David Stone
- Succeeded by: William Hawkins

Grand Master of the Grand Lodge of North Carolina and Tennessee
- In office December 16, 1808 – November 29, 1811
- Preceded by: John Hall
- Succeeded by: Robert Williams

1st Adjutant General of North Carolina
- In office 1806–1807
- Appointed by: Nathaniel Alexander
- Preceded by: Office established
- Succeeded by: Edward Pasteur

Member of the North Carolina House of Commons
- In office 1789–1792; 1804–1805

Member of the North Carolina Senate
- In office 1792–1800

Personal details
- Born: January 10, 1756 Charles Town, South Carolina
- Died: January 26, 1826 (aged 70) Smithville, North Carolina, US
- Party: Democratic-Republican
- Spouse: Sarah Dry

Military service
- Allegiance: United States
- Branch: Continental Army
- Rank: Colonel
- Battles: American Revolutionary War; Battle of Long Island; Battle of Beaufort

Benjamin Smith (January 10, 1756 – January 26, 1826) was the 16th governor of North Carolina from 1810 to 1811.

== Early life ==
Smith was born in Charles Town, South Carolina into a socially prominent family, later moving to Brunswick County, North Carolina. His parents were Thomas Smith and Sarah Moore Smith. During the American Revolutionary War, Smith served an aide-de-camp to General George Washington and rose to the rank of colonel in the Continental Army.

== Political career ==
In 1784, Smith was elected to the Continental Congress, although it is unclear whether he actually served. He was active in the North Carolina Constitutional Conventions of 1788 and 1789, and served a number of terms in the North Carolina General Assembly, in 1783 (Senate), 1789–1792 (House of Commons), 1792–1800 (Senate), 1801 (House of Commons) 1804–1805 (House of Commons) and 1806–1810 (Senate). From 1795 to 1799, Smith was the Speaker of the North Carolina Senate, and in 1798 he was the Federalist nominee for the U.S. Senate, losing to Jesse Franklin. During his political career, Smith also sat on the Board of Trustees of the University of North Carolina at Chapel Hill and donated 20,000 acres (81 km^{2}) of land for the university's endowment; he chaired the trustees during his term as governor. As of 1789, he owned 221 slaves.

In 1810, aligned with the Democratic-Republican Party (he had earlier had Federalist leanings), Smith was elected governor by the North Carolina General Assembly. He served only a single one-year term, and emphasized reform of the state's criminal code and penitentiary system. Although Smith did seek re-election to the governor's seat in 1811, he polled behind William Hawkins on the first ballot and withdrew himself from consideration. He later returned to the North Carolina Senate in 1816.

== Death ==
Smith died in Smithville, North Carolina in 1826 and is buried at the St. Philip's Church near Wilmington.

== Honors ==
Smithville (present day Southport), North Carolina, was named after him.

Political offices
Preceded by William Lenoir	Speaker of the North Carolina Senate; 1795–1799	Succeeded by Joseph Riddick
Preceded by David Stone	Governor of North Carolina; 1810–1811	Succeeded by William Hawkins
Military offices
New office	Adjutant General of North Carolina; 1806–1807	Succeeded by Edward Pasteur
Masonic offices
Preceded by John Hall	Grand Master of the Grand Lodge of North Carolina and Tennessee; 1808–1811	Succeeded by Robert Williams
