= William Cicero Allen =

American educator and writer

- Born: December 12, 1859; Halifax, North Carolina, U.S.
- Died: October 25, 1952 (aged 92); Waynesville, North Carolina, U.S.
- Education: Wake Forest College
- Occupations: Educator, school administrator, and author

William Cicero Allen (December 12, 1859 – October 25, 1952) was an American educator, historian, and author from North Carolina. He was superintendent of numerous school systems in North Carolina, including Canton, Waynesville, Weldon, and Haywood County. Allen established the first public high school west of Asheville in North Carolina.

He wrote several history books and textbooks, including History of Halifax County, published in 1918. His book, North Carolina Stories, was on the North Carolina State Board of Education's booklist for 42 years.

== Early life ==
Allen was born in Halifax, North Carolina on December 12, 1859. He was the son of Maria Aaron and James Vinson Allen, a merchant in Halifax County. His grandfather, James Allen, was a colonel in the Halifax Regiment of the Continental Army during the Revolutionary War. His family was of Scottish ancestry and were Methodists.

He was educated in the public schools in Halifax. He then enrolled in Wake Forest College. His parents died while he was at college; he used his inheritance of $500 to finish college, graduating on June 3, 1885. After graduation, Allen sold his college furnishings for $5, enough to cover the train to his aunt's house in Weldon, North Carolina. Next, he lived with his uncle on a farm outside of Weldon.

== Career ==
=== Educator ===
In the fall of 1885, Allen taught school in Beaufort County, North Carolina, followed by Martin County. He was the principal of Pantego Male and Female Academy in Beaufort County from 1885 to 1887. He was the superintendent of Scotland Neck Military Academy in Scotland Neck from 1887 to 1892. Because the state was unable to provide guns for the academy, Allen purchased weapons for the students at his own expense.

Allen was the principal of Wilson High School in Wilson, North Carolina from 1894 to 1897, and principal of Reidsville High School in Reidsville, North Carolina from 1897 to 1899. Next, he was the superintendent of Waynesville City Schools in Waynesville, North Carolina from 1898 to 1913. He was responsible for organizing the newly created school system and also established Waynesville High School, the first public high school west of Asheville in North Carolina.

Allen was superintendent of Weldon Public Schools in Weldon, North Carolina in 1913, followed by being the superintendent of the Barnwell City Schools in Barnwell, South Carolina for one term. After working for the American Red Cross during World War I, he became superintendent of schools of Canton, North Carolina, working there from 1919 to 1922.

Allen became the training director at the U.S. Veterans' Administration Vocational School in Waynesville from 1922 to 1925. From 1925 to 1929, he was the superintendent of special charter schools for Haywood County, North Carolina. Allen taught in Waynesboro and at Waynesville High School from 1925 until his retirement in 1945 at the age of 82.

He was a member of the National Educational Association and the North Carolina Educational Association.

=== Writer ===
In 1893, Allen left education and worked for the Advance newspaper in Wilson, North Carolina. Allen wrote state history articles for The Wilmington Daily News. In 1901, Allen published North Carolina Stories, a textbook for children. It was on the North Carolina State Board of Education's booklist for 42 years. In 1902, he published a book on the history of the Whigs and Tories. In 1908, he published Centennial of Haywood County and its County Seat Waynesville, N.C., for the hundredth anniversary of the establishment of Haywood County, North Carolina. In 1916, he released his second textbook, A Child's History of North Carolina. This was followed by History of Halifax County in 1918.

In 1932, Allen started writing a book on the history of Haywood County. It was published in 1935. His book, The Story of Our State, North Carolina, was published in 1942 and was approved by the North Carolina State Board as a supplementary textbook for fifth and eighth grade.

== Personal life ==
Allen married Cottie Wilkinson on December 20, 1887. She was a teacher at Panteo Academy, where Allen was principal. They had a son, W. C. Allen Jr., and a daughter, Lillian.

During World War I, Allen was the field director for the American Red Cross at the Army General Hospital No. 18 in Waynesville. He was a member of the Waynesville First Baptist Church and served as the superintendent of its Sunday school for 25 years and a deacon for 40 years. He was a member of the Knights of Pythias and the Odd Fellows. He was a Democrat.

On October 25, 1952, Allen died at the age of 92 in the Waynesville hospital after suffering a fall at his home a week before. He was buried at Green Hill Cemetery.

== Publications ==
=== Nonfiction books ===
- Centennial of Haywood County and its County Seat Waynesville, N.C. Waynesville: Courier Printing Company, 1908.
- History of Halifax County. Boston: The Cornhill Company, 1918.
- The Annals of Haywood County, North Carolina: Historical, Sociological, Biographical and Genealogical.1935
- The Story of Our State, North Carolina. with Clarence W. Griffin. Raleigh: Dixie Press, 1942.

=== Children's books ===
- North Carolina History Stories. Richmond: B. F. Johnson Publishing Company, 1901.
- A Child's History of North Carolina: A Text-Book for North Carolina Schools. New York City: Authors Co-Operative Pub., 1916.

== External sources ==
- "W. C. Allen: Teacher and Historian". Asheville Citizen-Times. 26 October 1952. p. 17.
- "History of Halifax County". The Roanoke News. 21 November 1918. p. 3.
- "Histories of Pitt and Halifax". The News and Observer. 27 January 1919. p. 4.
- Starnes, Richard D. (1997). ""The Stirring Strains of Dixie": The Civil War and Southern Identity in Haywood County, North Carolina". The North Carolina Historical Review. 74 (3): 256–257. ISSN 0029-2494. JSTOR 23521735.
