= Joseph Hunter Bryan =

American politician

Joseph Hunter Bryan (April 9, 1782 – December 28, 1839) was a Congressional Representative from North Carolina. He was born in Martin County, North Carolina, and was a brother of Henry Hunter Bryan.

Member of the State house of commons 1804, 1805, and 1807–1809; trustee of the University of North Carolina at Chapel Hill, 1809–1817, and was sent to Tennessee on behalf of the university to secure from the general assembly of Tennessee its claims to escheated lands; elected as a Democratic-Republican to the Fourteenth and Fifteenth Congresses (March 4, 1815 – March 3, 1819); interment in Elmwood Cemetery, Memphis, Tennessee. He died at La Grange, Tennessee.

== See also ==
- Fourteenth United States Congress
- Fifteenth United States Congress

U.S. House of Representatives
Preceded by Willis Alston	Member of the U.S. House of Representatives from North Carolina's 2nd congressional district 1815–1819	Succeeded by Hutchins G. Burton
