= William R. Davie House =

Historic house in North Carolina, United States

- U.S. National Register of Historic Places
- U.S. Historic district – Contributing property
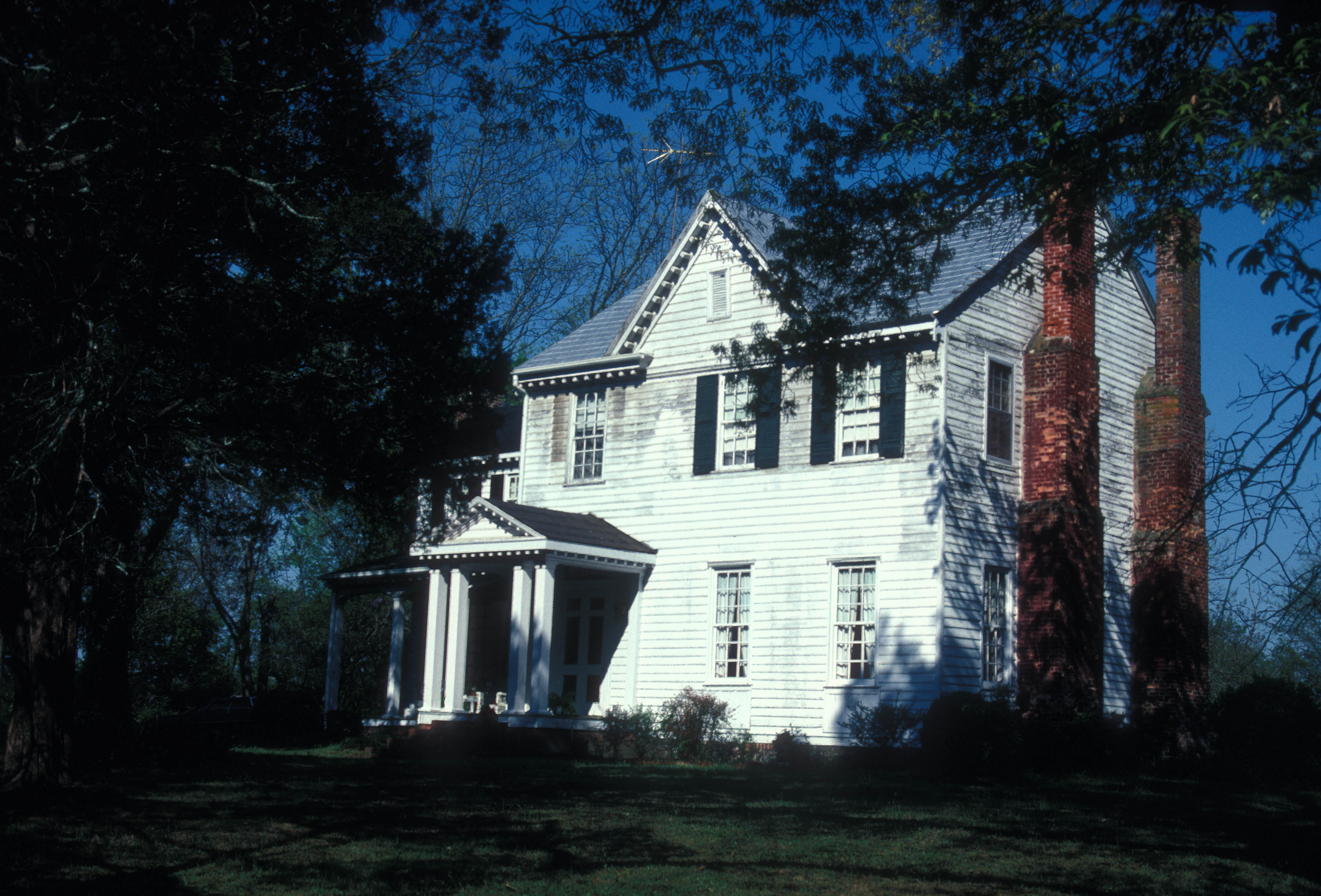

- Location within North Carolina Location within the United States
- Location: Norman St., Halifax, North Carolina
- Coordinates: 36°19′52″N 77°35′32″W
- Area: 1 acre (0.40 ha)
- Built: c.1785
- NRHP reference No.: 73001348
- Added to NRHP: June 19, 1973

The William R. Davie House, on Norman St. in Halifax, Halifax County, North Carolina, is a historic house with significance dating from 1783. William R. Davie (1756–1820) was born in England. He was a Founding Father of the United States and a patriot officer of mounted troops in the American Revolution who attended the Constitutional Convention from North Carolina, served as governor of North Carolina, served as a special ambassador to France during the XYZ Affair, and served in the North Carolina legislature. The house, also known as Loretta, was built on five acres that Davie bought in 1783. It was built starting probably in about 1785. It is a large two-story, frame side-hall plan house beneath a gable roof. It has a two-story wing raised from an earlier one-story wing and a number of one-story rear additions. The house is sheathed in weatherboard and rests on a brick foundation.

It was listed on the National Register of Historic Places in 1973.
