= Church of the Immaculate Conception (Halifax, North Carolina) =

Historic church in North Carolina, United States

- Church of the Immaculate Conception and the Michael Ferrall Family Cemetery
- U.S. National Register of Historic Places
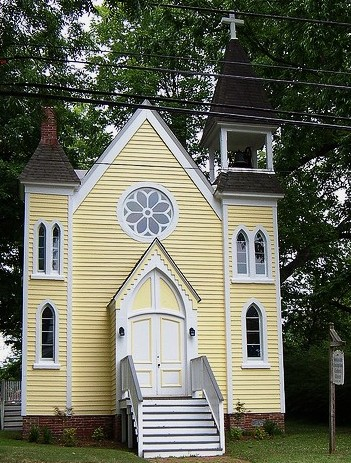
- Church of the Immaculate Conception

- Location within North Carolina Location within the United States
- Location: 145 S. King St., Halifax, North Carolina
- Coordinates: 36°19′33″N 77°35′29″W
- Area: 0.7 acres (0.28 ha)
- Built: 1859, 1889
- Architect: Durang, Edwin Forrest
- Architectural style: Late Gothic Revival
- NRHP reference No.: 97000533
- Added to NRHP: June 04, 1997

Church of the Immaculate Conception and the Michael Ferrall Family Cemetery is a historic Catholic church and cemetery in Halifax, North Carolina. The church was designed by noted Philadelphia architect Edwin Forrest Durang, and built in 1889. The church is basically a rectangular gable-front Late Gothic Revival style frame building, 20 feet wide and 37 feet deep. It features a pair of asymmetrical projecting corner towers and lancet-arch window openings. Adjacent to the church is the Michael Ferrall Family Cemetery, which contains the Michael Ferrall Family Vault built in 1859. Michael Ferrall, at one time mayor of Halifax, bought and lived in the former Eagle Tavern, built in the 1790s and now on the National Register of Historic Places, with his family. He operated his general commission business in a store house on the property adjacent to the former Eagle Tavern. When the store house burned down the land that it sat on was later subdivided into a rectangular, one-eighth acre lot and conveyed by Thomas W. Hill, trustee of Michael Ferrall’s estate, to the Catholic Church in 1889 for $100 for the construction of the Church of the Immaculate Conception. Michael Ferrall’s granddaughter, Nanny Gary, who lived in the Eagle Tavern until her death in 1969, left the house, lot and the family graveyard adjacent to the church to the Diocese of Raleigh in her will of 1963. After accepting the gift from Nanny Gary’s estate, the Diocese determined that it was not feasible to use the Ferrall house (Eagle Tavern) for charitable or religious purposes. The house was then conveyed to the Historic Halifax Restoration Association and the house was moved up King Street in the 1970s to the location of the Halifax Visitors Center where it was restored and interpreted as a museum in the style of the “Eagle Tavern”. The lot and graveyard were kept by the Catholic Diocese of Raleigh and is now maintained by members of the Saint John the Baptist Catholic Church in Roanoke Rapids. The church is one of only two churches still standing that were built by Servant of God Thomas Frederick Price, the first native North Carolinian to become a Catholic priest.

It was listed on the National Register of Historic Places in 1997.
