= St. Mark's Episcopal Church (Halifax, North Carolina) =

Historic church in North Carolina, United States

- U.S. National Register of Historic Places
- U.S. Historic district – Contributing property
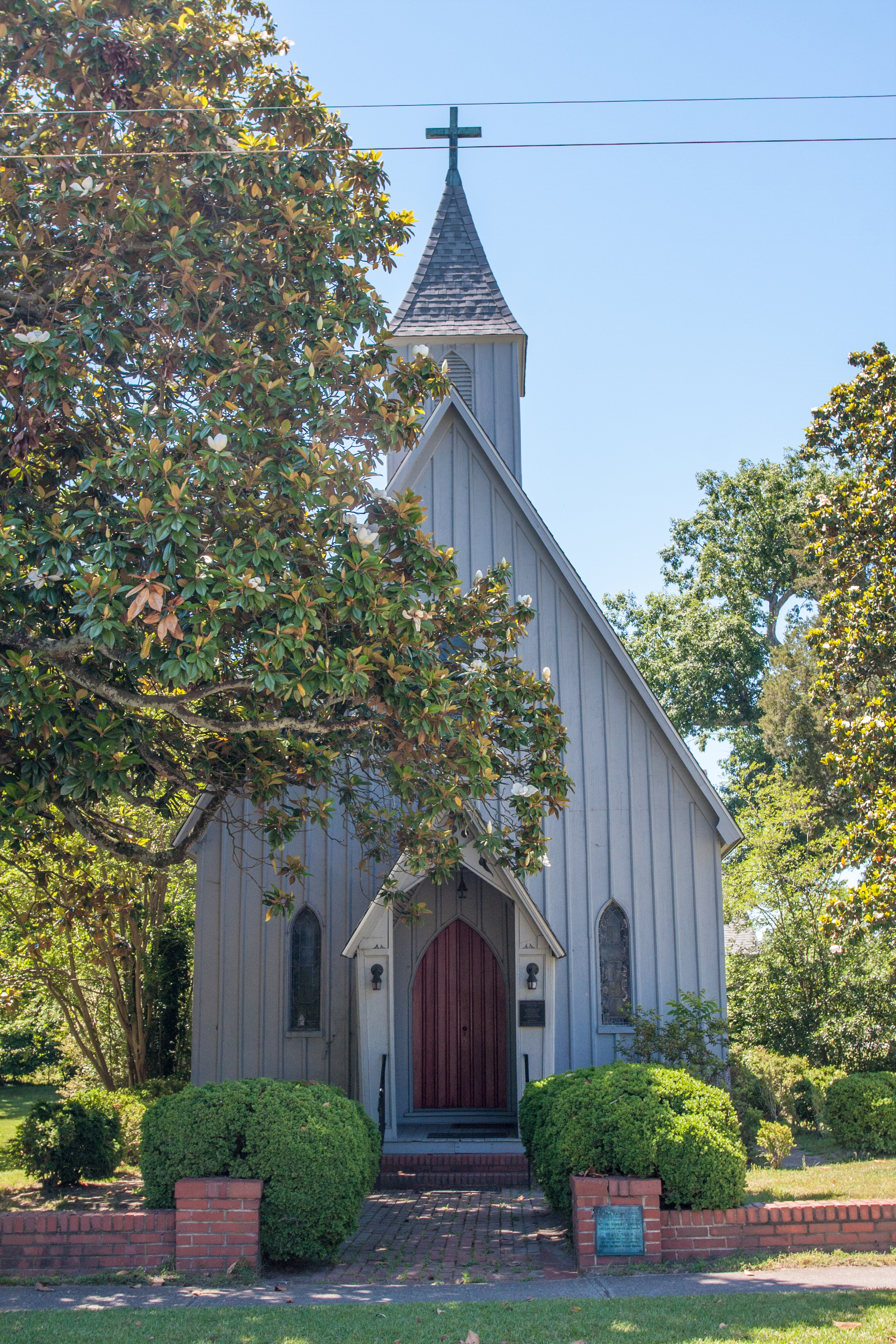

- Location within North Carolina Location within the United States
- Location: 204 S. King St., Halifax, North Carolina
- Coordinates: 36°19′34″N 77°35′31″W
- Area: 0.5 acres (0.20 ha)
- Built: 1855
- Architect: Fitzgerald, Frederick
- Architectural style: Gothic Revival
- NRHP reference No.: 98000158
- Added to NRHP: February 26, 1998

St. Mark's Episcopal Church is a historic Episcopal church located at 204 S. King Street in Halifax, Halifax County, North Carolina. Built in 1855, it is a gable-front Carpenter Gothic style frame building. It has a steep gable roof, tall pyramidal spire, and board-and-batten siding.

It was listed on the National Register of Historic Places in 1998.
