= Grand Lodge of North Carolina =

Freemasons in North Carolina

- Established: December 12, 1787 (238 years ago)
- Location: 2921 Glenwood Avenue, Raleigh, North Carolina, U.S.
- Coordinates: 35°49′15″N 78°39′53″W
- Region served: North Carolina
- Grand Master: Steve M. Norris
- Website: www.ncfreemasons.org

The Grand Lodge of North Carolina, formally the Grand Lodge of Ancient, Free and Accepted Masons of North Carolina, was formed on December 12, 1787. Previously, it was the Provincial Grand Lodge of North Carolina, being under jurisdiction of the Premier Grand Lodge of England since January 14, 1771. It is currently composed of 349 active lodges across the 100 counties of North Carolina. The Grand Lodge recognizes its Prince Hall counterpart, The Most Worshipful Prince Hall Grand Lodge of North Carolina and its Jurisdictions, Inc., and maintains co-territorial jurisdiction and encourages visitation between the two entities.

== Early Freemasonry in North Carolina ==
There are several stories or ‘legends' about masonic lodges in coastal colonial towns like Brunswick Town (near the mouth of the Cape Fear River), or Masonborough (near Masonboro Inlet), but none of these have been substantiated with definitive evidence.

The oldest known lodge in the province was Saint John's Lodge, No, 213, in Wilmington. It was noted on the roster of the Premier Grand Lodge of England on 27 June 1754 as having paid for its constitution. Its minutes from this period do not survive. However, there are references to the lodge in wills and other documents.

According to the cover of a sermon delivered at Christ's Church in New Bern in 1755 for the "Master, Wardens and Brethren of the New Bern Lodge of the Ancient and Honorable Fraternity of Free and Accepted Masons," a lodge had been established at that location.

Some time before 10 Dec 1764, the Grand Lodge of Massachusetts (Styled then as Saint John's Grand Lodge of Massachusetts) chartered First Lodge in Pitt County, or Crown Point Lodge (the former is how it was listed on the Massachusetts roll, the latter is how it was styled locally). This lodge went extinct during the American Revolution.

Buffalo Lodge was chartered 23 Dec 1766 and was on Buffalo Creek near the now extinct Bute County Courthouse. It was chartered by Blandford Lodge in St. Petersburg, Virginia. This lodge fell dormant during the revolution but was revived in Warrenton and then styled "Blandford-Bute Lodge" in 1782. Nothing was known about this lodge until its minute book was accidentally stumbled upon in a dilapidated barn in Warren County in 1916.

Some time before 1784, Union Lodge was chartered in the area of Fayetteville. One year earlier, the towns of Cross Creek and Campbellton merged to create Fayetteville. Records of Union's existence during this time are scant. It is not known which of the two towns the lodge was in. Its parent affiliation is unknown, but suggested to be the Grand Lodge of Scotland, possibly due to density of Scottish immigrants who settled in the area throughout the 18th century.

The earliest mention of a lodge working in Salisbury was in a 1775 will of William Temple Coles, an Irishman who left a half acre lot in the town to the citizens for a burial ground, half of which was reserved for "the Society of Freemasons." By 1779, one of the town's thoroughfares was named "Freemason Street," indicative of the lodge's probable location. The lodge at Salisbury, later called Old Cone Lodge, remained the most frontier lodge in North Carolina until the mid-1790s.

Finally, the last known working lodge in this early time period was Royal White Hart Lodge in Elk Marsh, near Halifax, NC. This lodge was active when Joseph Montfort arrived in the area and started attending. Its parent affiliation is unknown.

== Joseph Montfort and the Provincial Grand Lodge ==
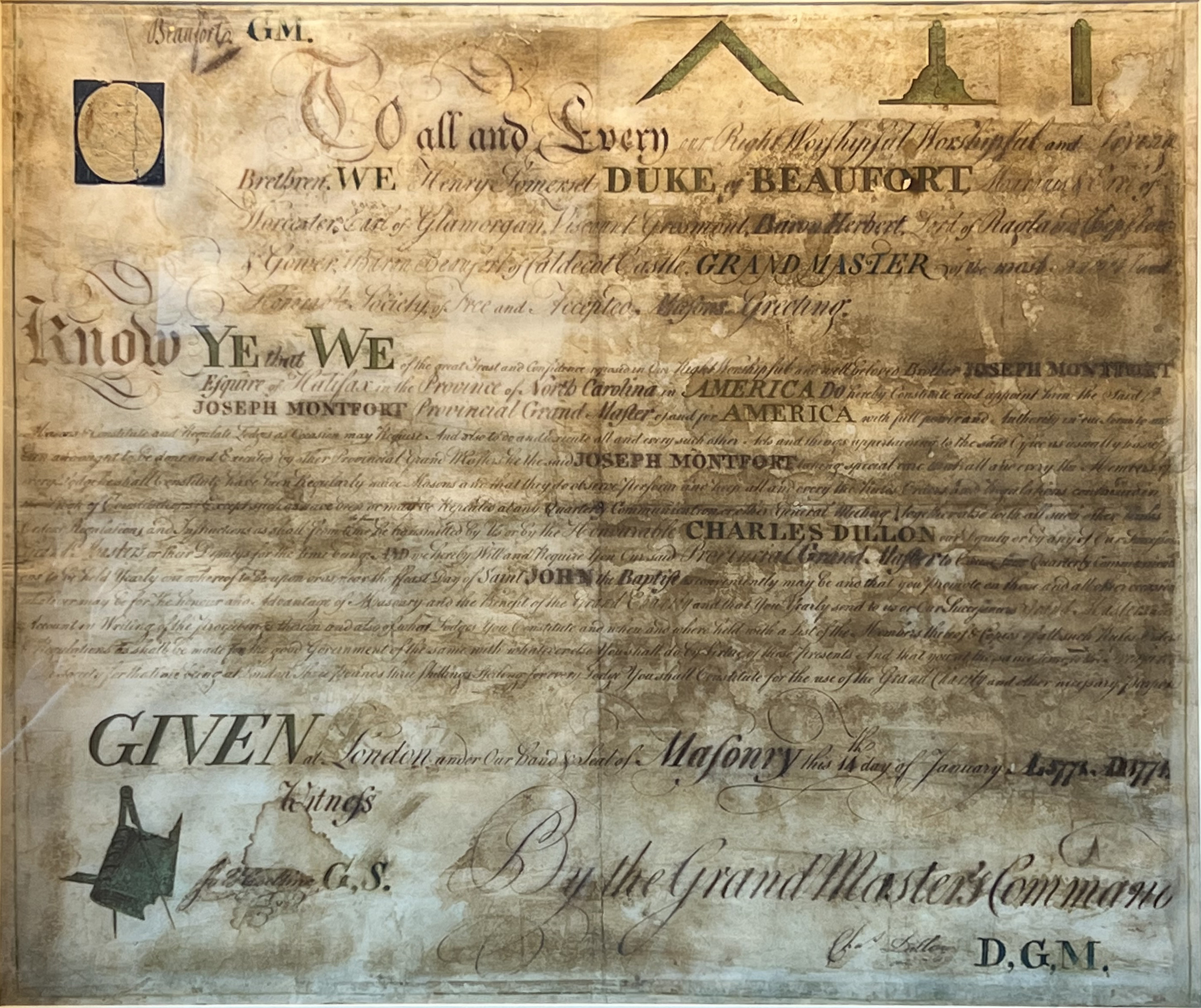
Joseph Montfort's certificate of appointment as Provincial Grand Master of and for America; signed by Grand Master of the Premier Grand Lodge of England Henry Somerset, Duke of Beaufort, January 14th, 1771.

Joseph Montfort was elected Master of the Royal White Hart Lodge in 1765. In 1767, he traveled to England, and amongst other business, procured an official Charter for Royal White Hart from Grand Master of the Premier Grand Lodge of England Henry Somerset, Duke of Beaufort, numbered 403.

On January 14, 1771, the Premier Grand Lodge appointed Montfort "Grand Master of and for America." The certificate of appointment is in possession of the Grand Lodge of North Carolina and is written in ink and copper on parchment. The seal of the Premier Grand Lodge of England is in the upper left corner. Although his commission granted him jurisdiction over the English colonies, notes from the Premier Grand Lodge of England at the time noted his commission's jurisdiction was over the Province of North Carolina. Nonetheless, Montfort styled his signature "G.M.A.," meaning "Grand Master, America," and indeed chartered a lodge outside the Province of North Carolina.

Other than Royal White Hart, Montfort chartered at least eight lodges in his jurisdiction, viz:

No. 2, Saint John's, New Bern, 11 Jan 1772

No. 3, Saint John's, Kinston, 1772

No. 4, Royal Edwin, Windsor, 2 July 1772

No. 5, Dornoch, Bute County (Now Warren County), c. 1773

No. 6, Unknown Lodge, c. 1774

No. 7, Cabin Point Royal Arch Lodge, Claremont, Virginia, 13 April 1775

No. 8, Royal William, Winton, 1775

No. 9, Unanimity, Edenton, 8 Nov 1775

Lodge number six exists deductively as lodges five and seven are known from minute books and the charter of Cabin Point No. 7. Its current disposition is unknown.

The Royal White Hart Lodge building was constructed in 1821 and is still in use today by Royal White Hart Lodge.

== Masonic Independence ==
The consternation of the Revolution proved tumultuous for the lodges in North Carolina. Many of the lodges took a pause, while others, like Unanimity in Edenton, were having a regular meeting at Horniblow's in the King Arms Tavern in Edenton on July 4, 1776.

In fact, the Union Lodge in Fayetteville sent out a letter to all the lodges in the state dated January 1, 1787, asking for aid in

"filling up that sublime office [of Provincial Grand Master] with some well tryed [sic] and Honorible [sic] Brother, to preserve that good order and government, which have always been the characteristics of the regular lodges of our Fraternity."

The letter called that a convention of delegates be held in Fayetteville on 24 June, being the day of the Feast of Saint John the Baptist.

By the time this circular made its way to the lodges of the state, only a handful complied and sent delegates to Fayetteville. Since there was not enough to hold a quorum, the convention was forfeit.

A second attempt emanated from Saint John's Lodge in New Bern a few weeks later. This time, to convene in Tarborough concurrent with the meeting of the North Carolina General Assembly in December 1787. The letter is reproduced in their historic minutes and was sent to all the lodges previously mentioned, including one not yet discussed: a lodge in Rockingham. A lodge in that area near the banks of the Pee Dee River is certainly plausible, especially by 1787. It is also possible that the New Bern letter sent it to them because the Union lodge circular did previously. Nevertheless, the mysterious lodge in Rockingham was not present at Tarborough, and thus passed out of existence.

== Rechartering of the Grand Lodge ==
All other working North Carolina lodges were at the Tarborough convention with the exception of Saint John's in Wilmington. This convention rechartered the Grand Lodge of Ancient, Free and Accepted Masons of North Carolina on 12 Dec 1787. Montfort's Cabin Point Lodge No. 7 went on to become a founding Lodge of the Grand Lodge of Virginia, being rechartered as No. 8 on their roll.

Over the next several years, member lodges were re-warranted to bring their charters in amity. Minutes are not clear why, but may suggest masonic landmark differences from the Ancients and Moderns schism or incongruent charters from other grand jurisdictions.

Union Lodge became Phoenix Lodge, Blandford-Bute became Johnston-Caswell, Old Cone was re-chartered, but kept their name, Dornoch was rechartered with the same name, and Royal William became American George Lodge.

Logistics out of the way, in 1791 the Grand Lodge focused on precedence for numbering purposes. Saint John's in Wilmington, now able to show its true charter date, proved to be working longer than Royal White Hart and Saint John's in New Bern by one year. It was given No. 1 and joined the convention. Montfort's remaining lodges were organized in order after that, and then Phoenix, Old Cone, and Johnston-Caswell. Dornoch Lodge became extinct before this renumbering and therefore was not given a new number. It's also possible that its membership joined an adjacent lodge instead of continuing.

Shortly after its founding, the new by-laws were established and signed by a delegate from each lodge. In 1797 the Grand Lodge was incorporated by act of the General Assembly of North Carolina.

Its previous association being with the Moderns' Premier Grand Lodge of England, the rechartered Grand Lodge chose to align closer with the Ancients' Grand Lodge of England (1751–1813). North Carolina used Laurence Dermott's Ahiman Rezon, William Preston's Illustrations of Masonry (1804 ed.), and Thomas Webb's Illustrations of Masonry (1802 ed.) to create and publish its own Ahiman Rezon and Masonic Ritual in 1805. There were ten printing presses in the state at the time and only a handful of books had ever been printed. The Grand Lodge ordered that fifty copies be created for the current lodges and for future lodges. An original copy of this book is exceptionally rare.

== Release of Tennessee Jurisdiction ==
The newly formed North Carolina government of the United States inherited the territory of the former province in 1776. The western boundary of the state was the Mississippi River. In 1790, the state government gave its western lands on the opposite side of the Blue Ridge to the Federal Government to absolve its recent war debt. In 1796, this territory became Tennessee. North Carolina did not divide its masonic jurisdiction until 1813. The Grand Lodge included Tennessee in its formal name. Up until then, the Grand Lodge of North Carolina and Tennessee had chartered nine lodges in Tennessee. Those nine lodges in convention petitioned the Grand Lodge for a release of jurisdiction or charter so that they could assemble a formal independent Grand Lodge of Tennessee.

Authorized by Grand Master Robert Williams and the delegates of the Grand Lodge, the document was sealed and signed on 30 Sep 1813. The following lodges retired their North Carolina charters for Tennessee charters:

No. 29, Saint Tammany, Nashville: became TN No. 1 (extinct by 1813)

No. 41, Polk, Knoxville,: became TN No. 2 (extinct 1816)

No. 43, Greeneville: became TN No. 3

No. 50, Newport: became TN No. 4 (extinct 1827)

No. 51, Overton, Rogersville: became TN, No. 5

No. 52, King Solomon, Gallatin: became TN No. 6 (extinct 1836)

No. 55, Hiram, Franklin: became TN No. 7

No. 60, Cumberland, Nashville: became TN No. 8

No. 61, Western Star, Port Royal: became TN No. 9.

== Philanthropy ==
Grand Master William R. Davie laid the cornerstone for the first public university in the country, the University of North Carolina (now UNC-Chapel Hill), near New Hope Chapel in Orange County in 1793 just several weeks after George Washington laid the cornerstone for the United States' Capitol in the newly rising Federal City.

Wanting to continue this partnership of masonry and education in the state, the Grand Lodge resolved to create a masonic school. Grand Master David Williamson Stone first proposed a charity school in Raleigh in 1838, but it was tabled until 1847 when the Grand Lodge started fundraising for such an institute. In 1850, various lodges across the state made various offers of cash and real estate to secure the physical plant for the new Seminary of Learning. The delegates selected the offer from Tuscarora Lodge No. 122 in Oxford to be the seat of the new school. The lodge agreed to provide $8,495 and 10 acres of land towards the erection of a school building. The school was incorporated by the legislature and named "Saint John's College." Land was purchased in 1853 and Virginia architect W.G. Butler designed the building. Captain John Berry (1798-1870), a builder and stonemason from Hillsborough was contracted to construct the structure. Berry had made a name for himself locally through the construction of several notable buildings: Eagle Masonic Lodge in Hillsborough, a previous Caswell County Courthouse, The Hillsborough Academy, the Orange County Courthouse, a previous Person County Courthouse, several UNC campus buildings, and the old main building of Wake Forest College in Wake Forest.

The cornerstone of St. John's College was laid on June 25, 1855 and the building completed by July 1857. From the 1857 Grand Lodge proceedings:

"The entire building is one hundred and twenty-two feet in length, forty feet deep in the wings, sixty feet in the centre or main building; it is three stories high, with a basement and attic. There are fifty-two dormitories, forty-four of which will accommodate two students each, and eight of them, four each; all of which are heated with warmed air. Four rooms, suited for the accommodation of Tutors and Professors, and having a fire place. Four large recitation rooms, two elegant halls designed for the use of the two Literary Societies, a spacious chapel, with a gallery surrounding, capable of seating conveniently twelve hundred persons."

The school remained in debt into the American Civil War but closed in 1863. By 1868, the Grand Lodge had paid off the mortgage on the property and decided to sell the college by the end of 1870. However, instead of selling, Brother John H. Mills proposed that it be converted to an "asylum for the protection, training, and education of indigent orphan children." And thus, the Masonic Home for Children in Oxford was born and continues to be one of the two main philanthropies of masons in North Carolina. The other philanthropy is the Masonic and Eastern Star Home in Greensboro, North Carolina. It is formally called WhiteStone, after the first administrator and the first family that moved there. It was founded in 1912 and per their website:

is the first and oldest Continuing Care Retirement Community in North Carolina, and was the first Masonic Fraternal Home in the U.S. created solely to care for the elderly.

== Grand Lodge buildings ==
After the Tarborough Convention in 1787, the Grand Lodge met in Hillsborough, Fayetteville, New Bern (most likely in Tryon's Palace like the local lodge did), and Tarborough. The Grand Lodge met for the first time in the new capital city of Raleigh in 1794. Democratic Lodge, No. 21 had already been working in the city since 1793, meeting in various homes of members and the new State House.

Rhodham Atkins, a builder and member of Democratic Lodge No. 21, designed the first State House in Raleigh. It was occupied by the General Assembly in 1794. The eighth annual communication of the Grand Lodge was held in the State House that same year.

=== First (1813-1876) ===
The Grand Lodge constructed its very first building on northeast corner of Morgan and Dawson Streets in downtown Raleigh. It was designed by Grand Secretary Alexander Lucas and the contractor was William Jones of Raleigh. The land was donated by Theophilus Hunter, which also contained a reversion clause if the fraternity ever left the property.

The Grand Lodge and Hiram Lodge No. 40 entered into a mortgage deed with the Raleigh Thespian Society where the fraternity occupied and maintained the upper floor and the society used the lower. Hiram Lodge had previously partnered with the Society when they shared the Raleigh Academy building on Burke Square in Raleigh before the Governor's Mansion was constructed.

The cornerstone was laid on Saint John's Day, June 24, 1813 and the structure was completed nearly 20 months later. Final touches included two coats of white paint on the exterior and shutters for each window. Throughout the years, many professional plays, variety shows, magic shows, and orchestrations were performed in the space. It was the first ever dedicated theatre in Raleigh.

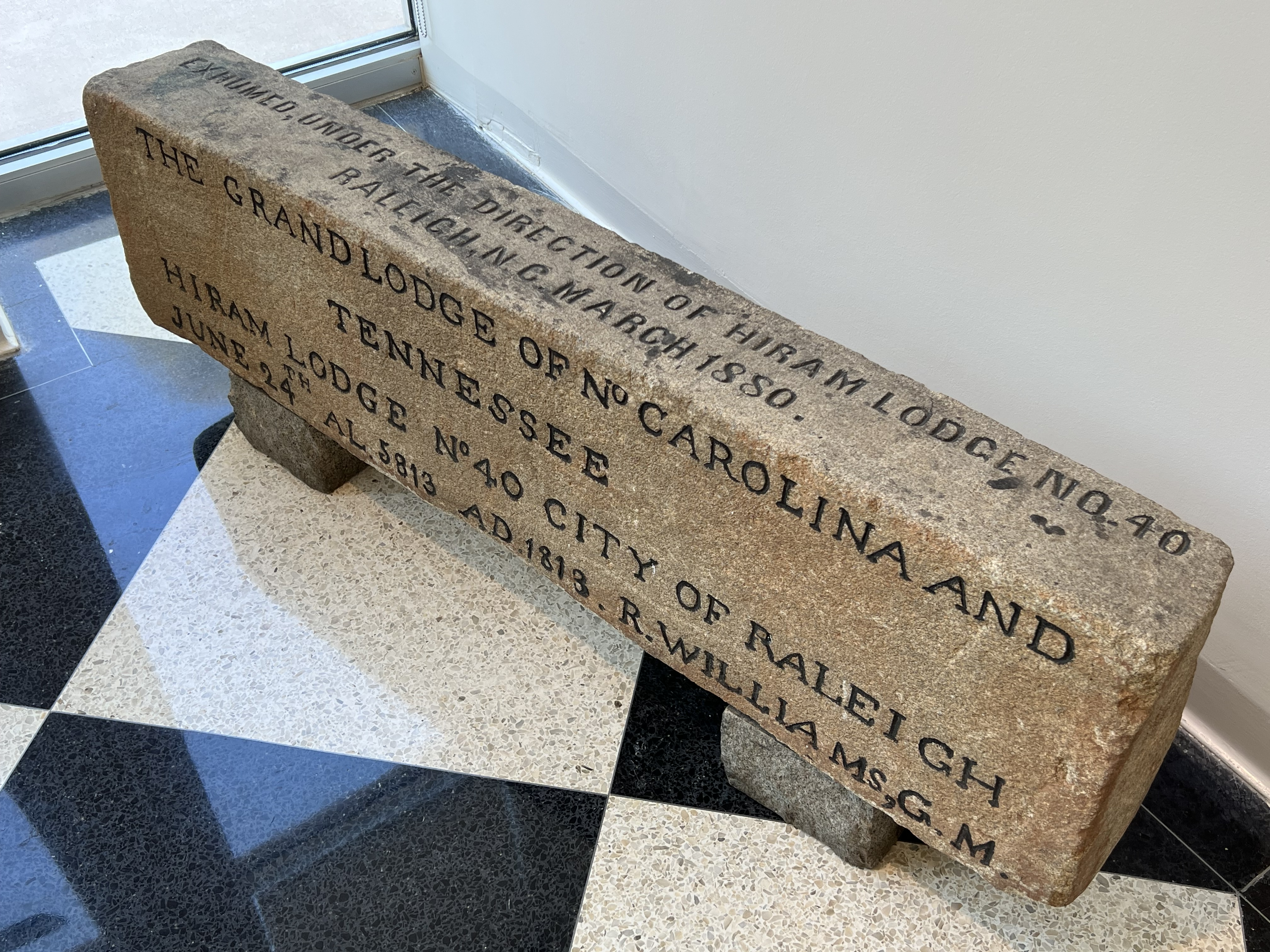
1813 Cornerstone of first Masonic Temple in Raleigh.

The Grand Lodge had outgrown the structure by 1874 and had started meeting elsewhere due to its dilapidated and neglected state. Other venues in the city had become more fashionable for performances. In 1876, it was sold to the Raleigh Primitive Baptist Church, who dismantled the building by 1880. The cornerstone was recovered from the site and is currently on display at the current Grand Lodge office museum. The Norman Adrian Wiggins School of Law of Campbell University and its parking structure now occupy the site.

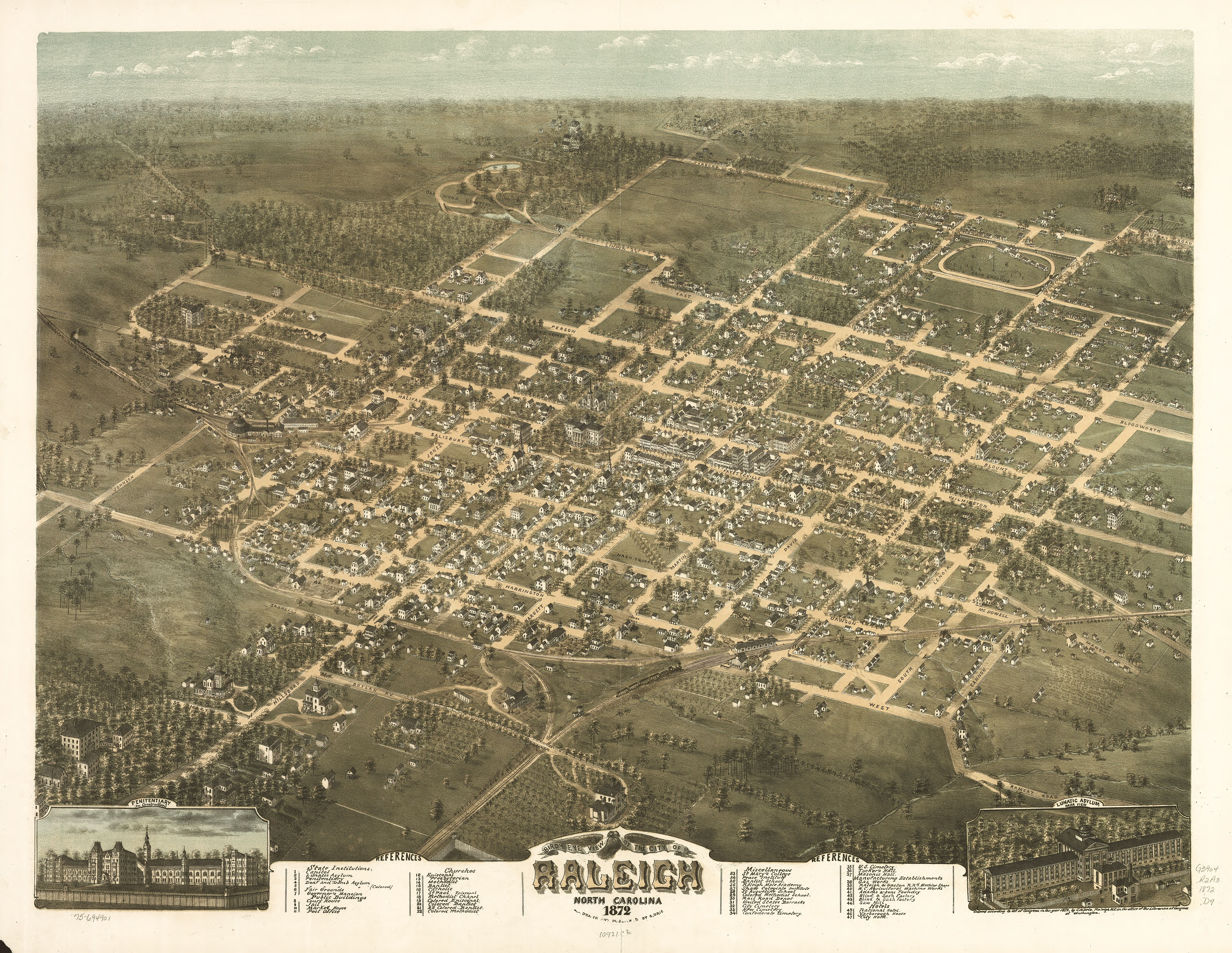
Number 37 on this 1872 map by Dries

The Grand Lodge had plans for a new building drawn up by George S.H. Appleget and purchased a site on the south side of the block where the Wake County Courthouse is situated. The Panic of 1873 and ensuing Long Depression created financial difficulty for the fraternity and the Grand Lodge liquidated the property before construction began.

While the initial plans for a new temple did not acquiesce as planned, the Grand Lodge met in several places in the interim.

The Grand Lodge met in an upper floor of the newly completed Fisher Building at 219 Fayetteville Street in downtown Raleigh from 1875 to 1878. The Fisher Building was either remodeled and destroyed around 1925 and another occupied the site until 1985 when One Exchange Plaza was constructed.

The Grand Lodge met on the 3rd floor of the newly completed Holleman Building at 210 Fayetteville Street starting in 1879 with a five year lease with an annual rent of $175. The architect of the Governor's Mansion and the Baptist Female University downtown (now Meredith College near I-440), Adolphus Gustavus Bauer, had his office in the same building. In 1896, the Lodge Hall on the 3rd floor was upfitted from gas to electricity. The Holleman Building survived well into the 20th century until replaced by the modern construction of the W.T. Grant Department Store in 1954.

=== Second (1907-1946) ===
Land parcels were assembled on the north-east corner of the intersection of Hargett and Fayetteville Streets, within a block of the Holleman Building, the State Capitol, and the site of one the first meetings of masons in Raleigh, Peter Casso's Inn. The inn stood on the southeast corner of Fayetteville and Morgan Street. By 1906, the assembly of land was complete and the Masonic Temple Construction Co. laid the cornerstone on 16 Oct, 1907. Over 1500 Master Masons were in attendance, making this the most masonically attended cornerstone ceremony in North Carolina history until the Prince Hall Compact resolution in 2008. According to the program, which was sealed into the cornerstone box, there was a long parade, the NC State College Band marched around several city blocks, and a host of dignitaries and attendees were at the construction site.

The Grand Lodge opened a Special Communication at Metropolitan Hall at 227 Fayetteville Street for the purposes of laying the stone. William Stuart Primrose, Grand Auditor, gave remarks before the procession to the site:

"It is fitting that the Grand Lodge of North Carolina should have a home of such proportions and of such high grade of architecture as to entitle it to the respect of all men, whether masons or not, and it is safe to say that it will recommend our noble Order to all who have not sought its benefits."

The architect was Charles McMillen (1854-1911), who was born in Ireland and became well known for his Masonic buildings in several states. He had recently won a competition for his 1898 design of the new Wilmington Masonic Temple on Front Street.

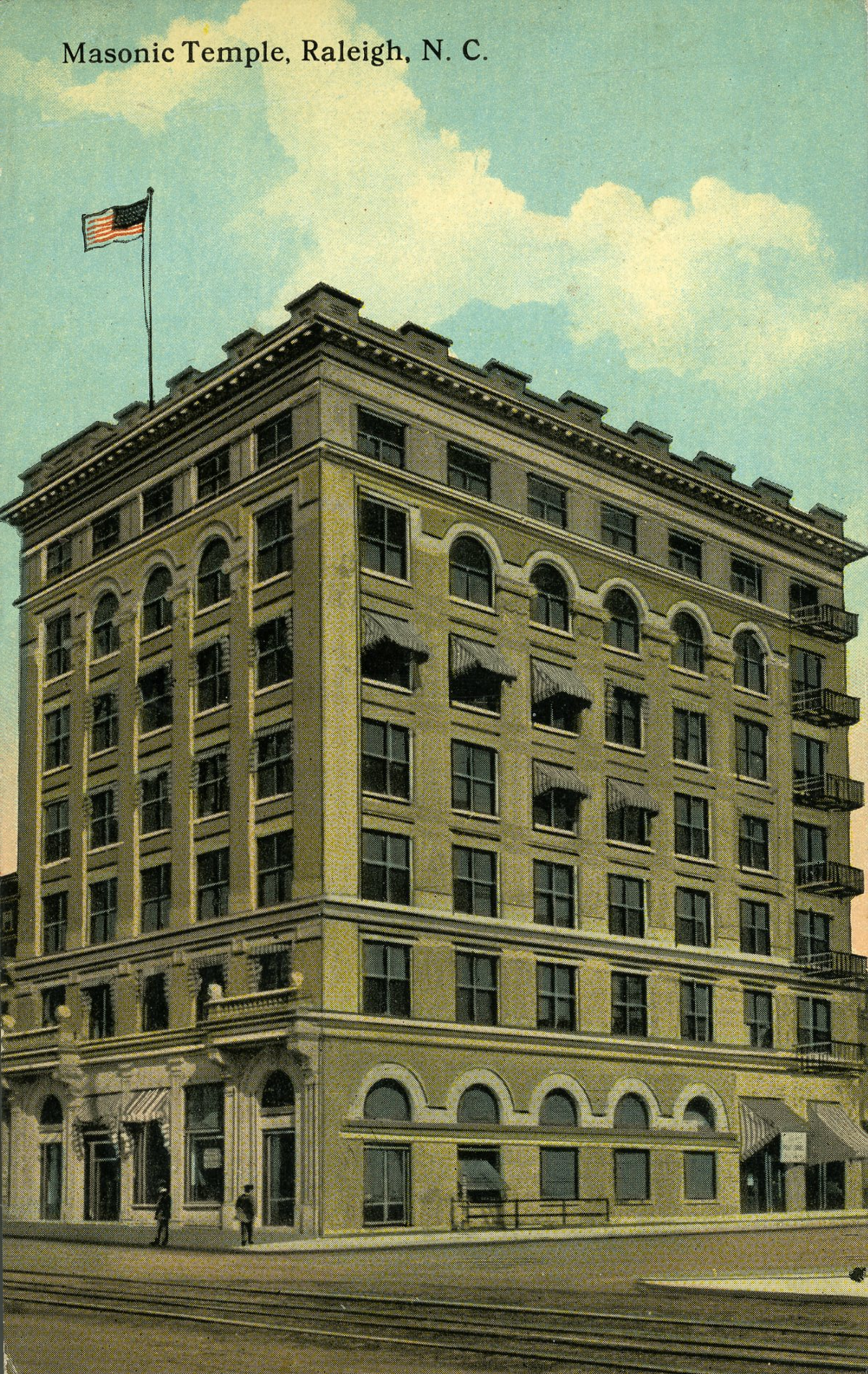
Postcard of the Raleigh Masonic Temple Building on Fayetteville Street

The structure's formal front faced Fayetteville Street, while a secondary front faced Hargett Street. The Fayetteville Street façade contained two formal arched entrances: the left side was for masons and upper level tenants, and the right side was the main entrance to a bank, which occupied the main ground floor retail space. The bank contained a mezzanine and vault. The Hargett Street Facade contained a south facing entrance to the Raleigh Savings Bank, a sidewalk level stair that provided access to the basement which contained the Masonic Temple Barber Shop, and another tenant space at the east end of the building that opened towards the new Raleigh Times Newspaper building. The Times had recently been purchased by Grand Secretary John C. Drewry, and had its office constructed a year prior in 1906.

The cornerstone was laid at street level on the left side of the arched limestone opening closest to the State Capitol. Masonic stones are typically laid in the northeast corner of an edifice under construction. Since the northeast corner would then be up against the adjacent existing building and located at the block's interior and inaccessible, it was decided to place it next to the entrance, where a practical ceremony can be performed.

As the building rose out of the ground, it was apparent that its tripartite classicism was intentional. From its entry in the National Historic Registry:

"The decorative skin of the building is a rather two-dimensional interpretation of classical detailing commonly favored by Beaux Arts practitioners. In addition, the deliberate use of the Greek orders on both the interior and exterior relates to their symbolic meaning within the Masonic order. Thus it is no coincidence that in the interior the street level is articulated in the Ionic order, the Masons office floor in the Doric order and the most and symbolic room of all, the Meeting Room, in the Corinthian Order."

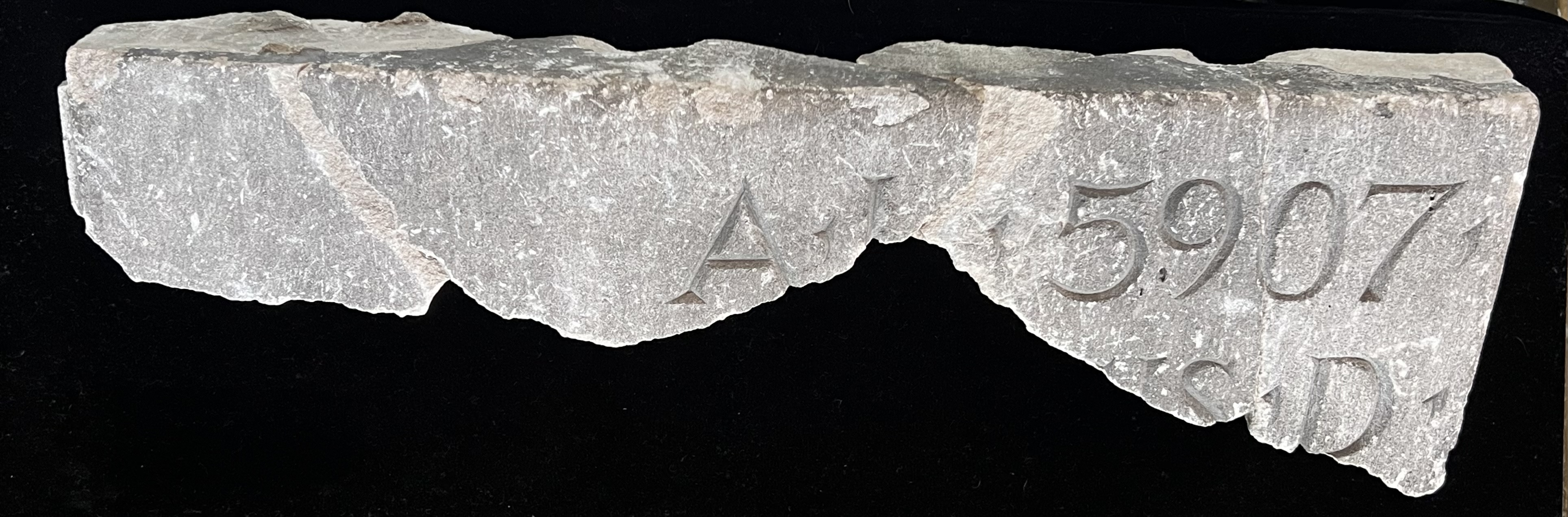
1907 cornerstone fragments in Grand Lodge Museum

It is the first and oldest reinforced concrete ‘skyscraper' in the State. It is still standing and is part of the Fayetteville Street Historic District. According to the historic nomination form for the building, the ground level west and south facades were heavily modified several times by stakeholders in the late 20th century. Upon its departure, the Grand Lodge broke apart the cornerstone and removed its copper time capsule. It is on display in the Grand Lodge museum gallery. The Masonic Temple is currently owned by Empire Properties.

=== Third (1957-current) ===
Due to their growing membership, lack of parking in the downtown area, and growing dissatisfaction with lack of autonomy with the Grand Lodge, the Blue Lodges and Grand Lodge decided to sell the building and divide into separate entities.

William G Hill Lodge, No. 218, Raleigh Lodge, No. 500, and Hiram Lodge No. 40, along with other appendant bodies in the building moved to the Raleigh estate of Josephus Daniels, colloquially named "Wakestone," for its use of local stone from a Wake County Quarry near Lassiter Mill. The group continued the "Raleigh Masonic Temple" moniker when the NC State College Architect and mason Roscoe Shumaker added a 300-seat theatre to the back of the existing house. The fly loft contained spaces for up to 83 different custom painted backdrops. The Grand Lodge Administration, Library, Archives, and museum did not move into Wakestone and placed everything into storage at the Raleigh Bonded Warehouse north of downtown Raleigh until a new home could be constructed.

Grand Secretary Wilbur L. McIver partnered with the building committee to reach out to Grand Lodges across the United States to assess how much square footage they needed for the various functions a contemporary Grand Lodge office building should require. Since the Blue Lodge function of the Temple Company was now at Wakestone with an adequate theatre hall, a large assembly room for the Annual Communication of the Grand Lodge was not needed, and therefore not part of the building program for the new Grand Lodge office building.

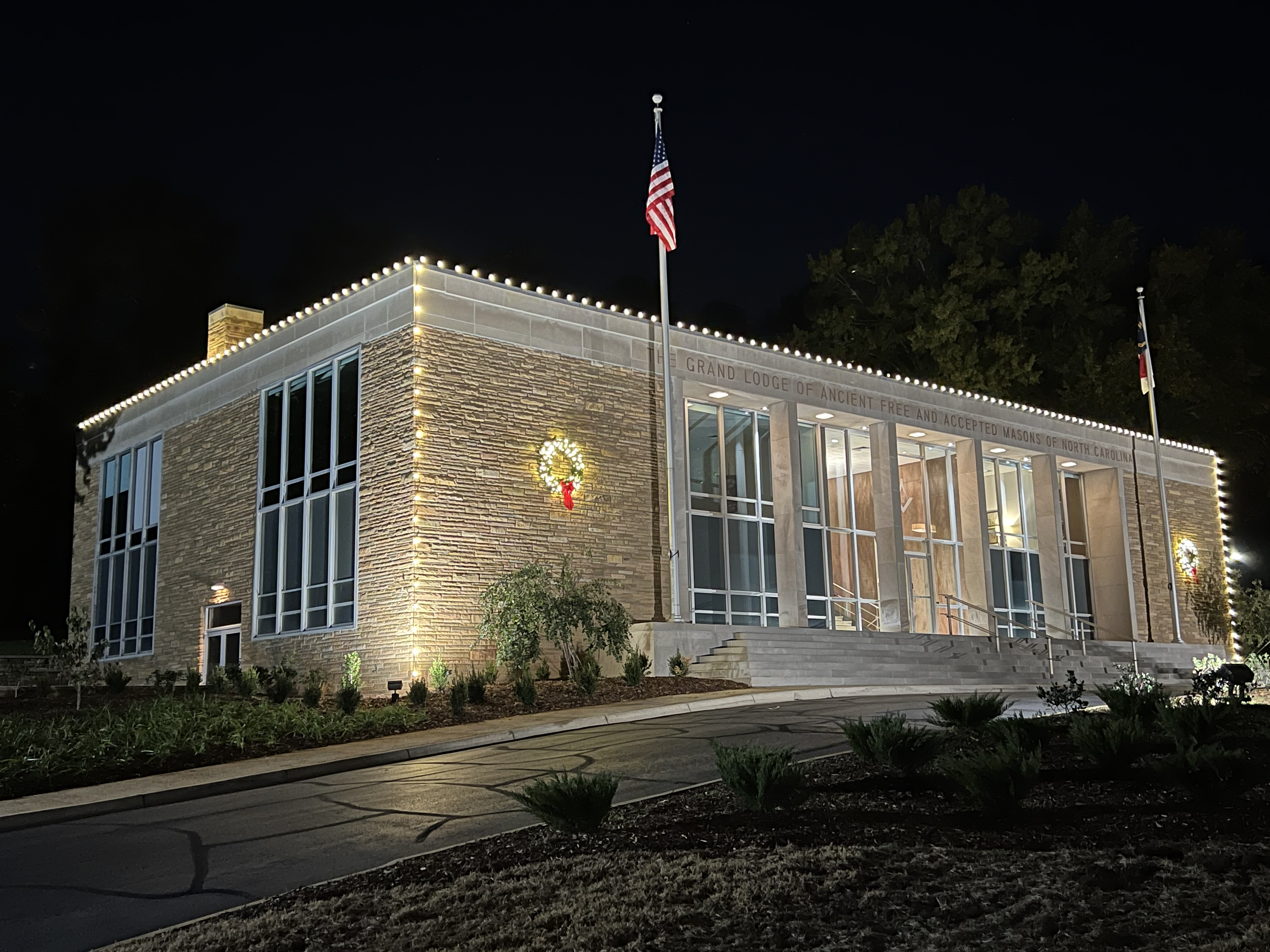
Grand Lodge Office Building at 2921 Glenwood Ave. in Raleigh.

Designed by Leslie Boney, Sr. (1880-1964), the Executive Office Building of the Grand Lodge of Ancient Free & Accepted Masons of North Carolina at 2921 Glenwood Avenue is the current seat of masonry in North Carolina. Boney and his three sons were all graduates of the North Carolina College of Agriculture and Mechanic Arts (now NC State University). In fact, Boney had been designing Bragaw Hall (pp. 11-13), a dormitory fit for occupancy of 816 students, on NC State's Campus, at the same time.

The cornerstone was laid on 15 Dec 1955 with masonic ceremonies. Unlike the new temple at Wakestone, the building was situated outside of the city limits of Raleigh, across from the Raleigh Country Club (now Carolina Country Club). Boney crafted the space in the modern tradition, using permanent materials like marble, granite, Crab Orchard stone from Tennessee, bronze, aluminum, Indiana Limestone, and terrazzo with aluminum storefront on all four sides. The south end of the building contains an office and conference room for the Grand Master and the north end contains workspace and offices for the Grand Secretary and his staff. The Grand Lodge circulated a press release prior to the laying of the cornerstone in 1955, stating:

"A bronze grille with abstractions of Masonic symbols will divide the entrance lobby from the main library and lounge [now the Main Hall]. A special feature of the lobby will be the bronze emblem of the Grand Lodge of Ancient, Free and Accepted Masons of North Carolina. This emblem will be mounted in the floor in the center of the building."

The building contains a library of over 4000 masonic volumes, with over half relating to masonry specifically in North Carolina. There is a complete set of proceedings (minutes) of the Grand Lodge in both published and manuscript forms dating from 1787 - 2012. In its archives, still, are older minute books and rare books that document the history of the state through the eyes of its lodges before the American Revolution.

Its museum rotates exhibits of jewels, artifacts, stones, charters, and portraits. In fact, the cornerstones of the two previous Grand Lodge buildings are in its collection.

==== Murals ====
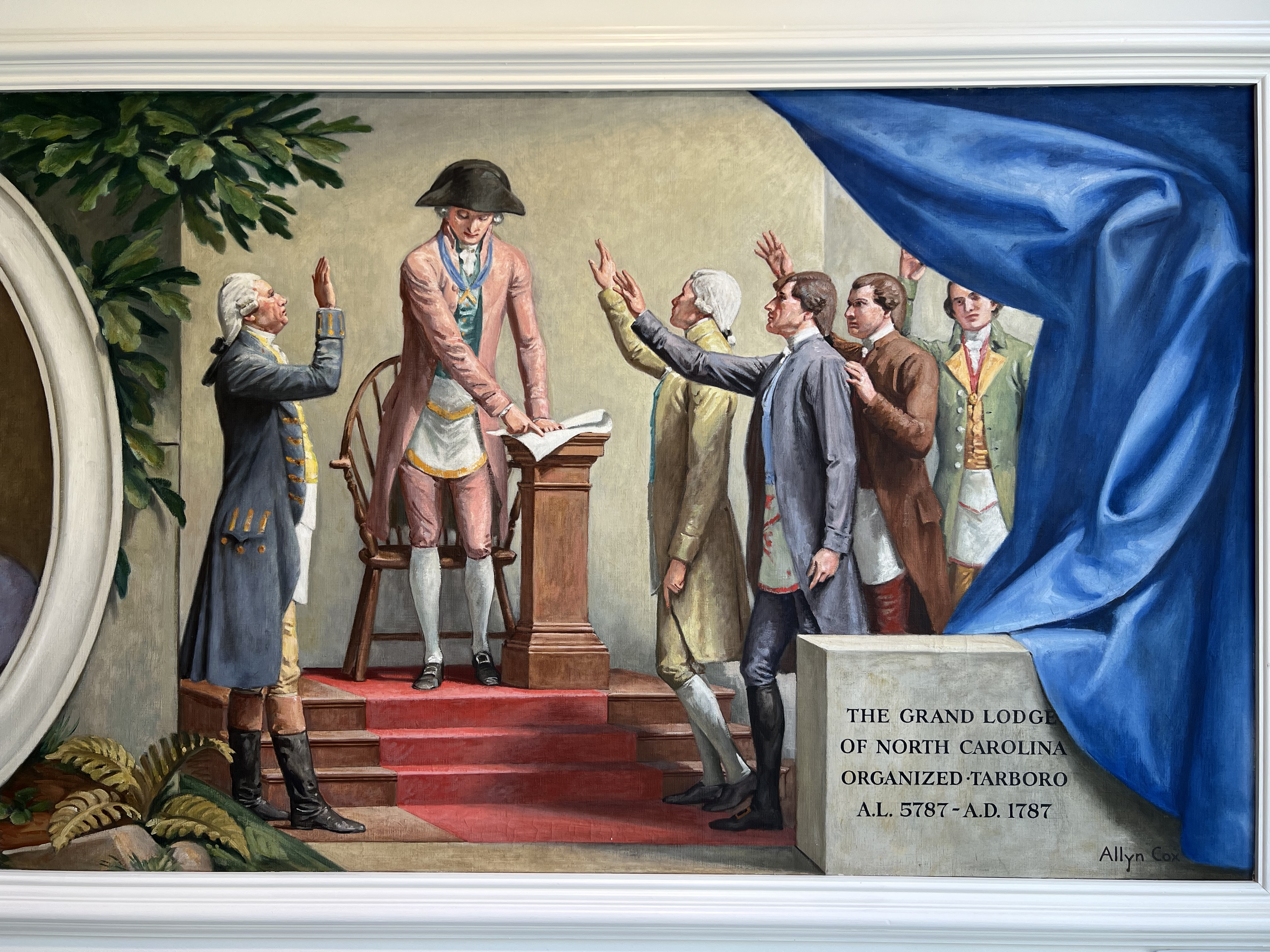
Cox's depiction of the installation of Samuel Johnston as the first Grand Master in 1787.

Painter Allyn Cox (1896-1982) was commissioned to design and paint two long murals inside the main hall that portrayed the history of Masonry in the state. Cox had previously completed Constantino Brumidi's "Frieze of American History," and the mural on the South Wall of the George Washington National Masonic Memorial in Alexandria, VA, entitled "Washington laying the Cornerstone of the National Capitol 18 Sep 1794." Much like the murals in Alexandria, they were painted in sheets and transported to the main hall in 1959, and fixed to the walls opposite each other. The murals were painted specifically for the main hall as the shadows in each align with the expanse of glass and light emanating from the rear of the building. He painted six vignettes with four portraits in between them.

== Prince Hall Compact ==
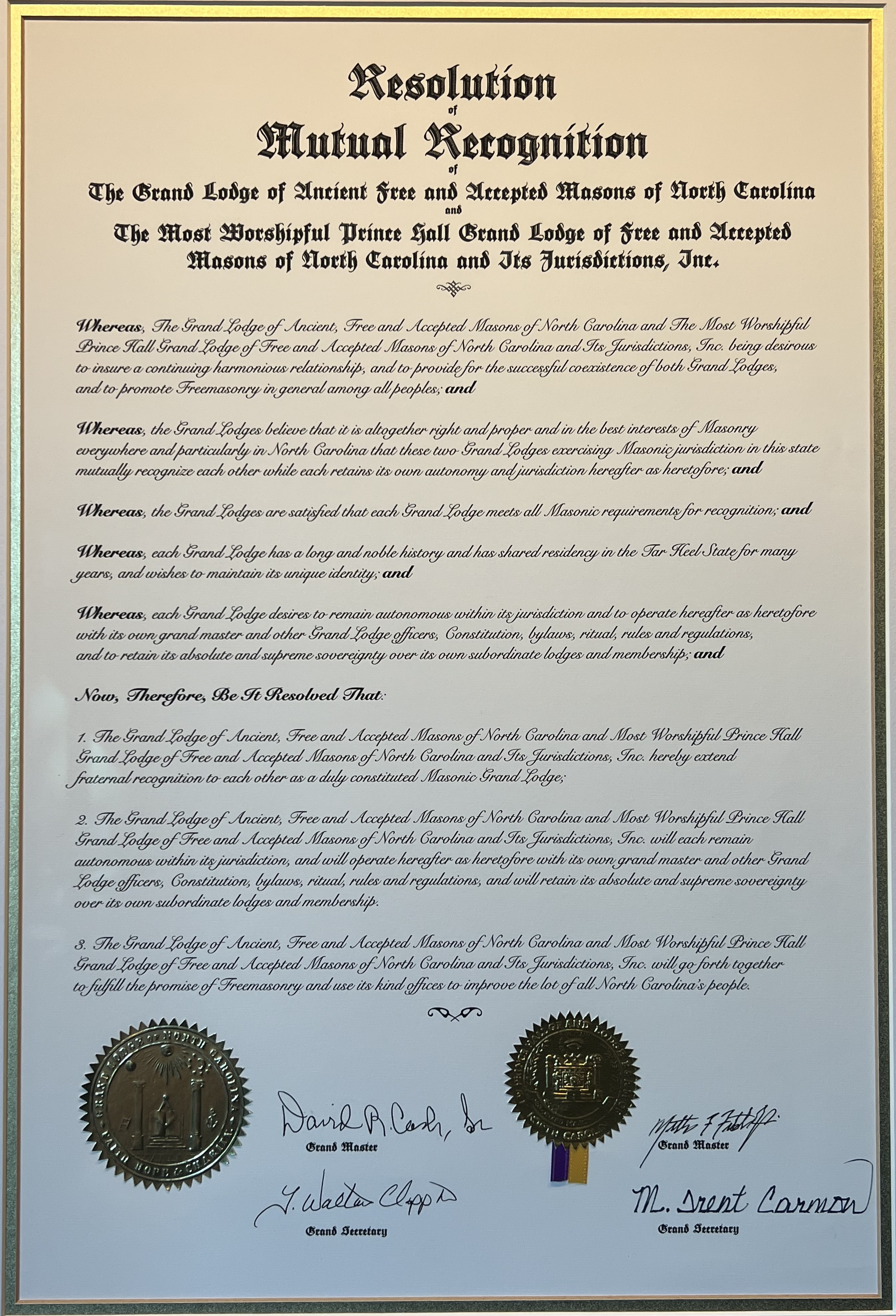
Photo of Original Document. Mutual Recognition between the MW Prince Hall Grand Lodge of NC and its Jurisdicitons, Inc., and the Grand Lodge of A.F. & A.M. of North Carolina. 2008. Grand Lodge Library.

Following a decade of discussion, the Grand Lodge of North Carolina voted on 19 Sep 2008 to recognize its counterpart, the Most Worshipful Prince Hall Grand Lodge of North Carolina, and its Jurisdictions, Inc., becoming the 41st jurisdiction in the United States to do so. The compact allows for co-territorial jurisdiction and visitation while maintaining the autonomy and sovereignty of each Grand Lodge.

The mutual recognition compact was formalized on 21 Nov 2008 at the North Carolina Capitol in Union Square in Raleigh. The event was held in the old House Chamber with overflow in the Senate Chamber and Rotunda. Masons filled the upper galleries and main floor of each chamber. With the building at full capacity from members of both Grand Lodges, other masons waited outside the building. Grand Master David Cash, of the A.F. & A.M. Grand Lodge, and Grand Master Toby Fitch, of the Prince Hall Grand Lodge, signed the compact on the same desk that North Carolina's secession from the United States was signed when it joined the Confederacy during the American Civil War in 1861.

The first joint ceremony of the two Grand Lodges was the cornerstone of the Richmond County Courthouse on 24 April 2009. The A.F. & A.M. Grand Lodge opened the meeting, and the Prince Hall Grand Lodge closed it.
