= Joseph Montfort =

Provincial Grand Master of and for America from 1771 to 1776

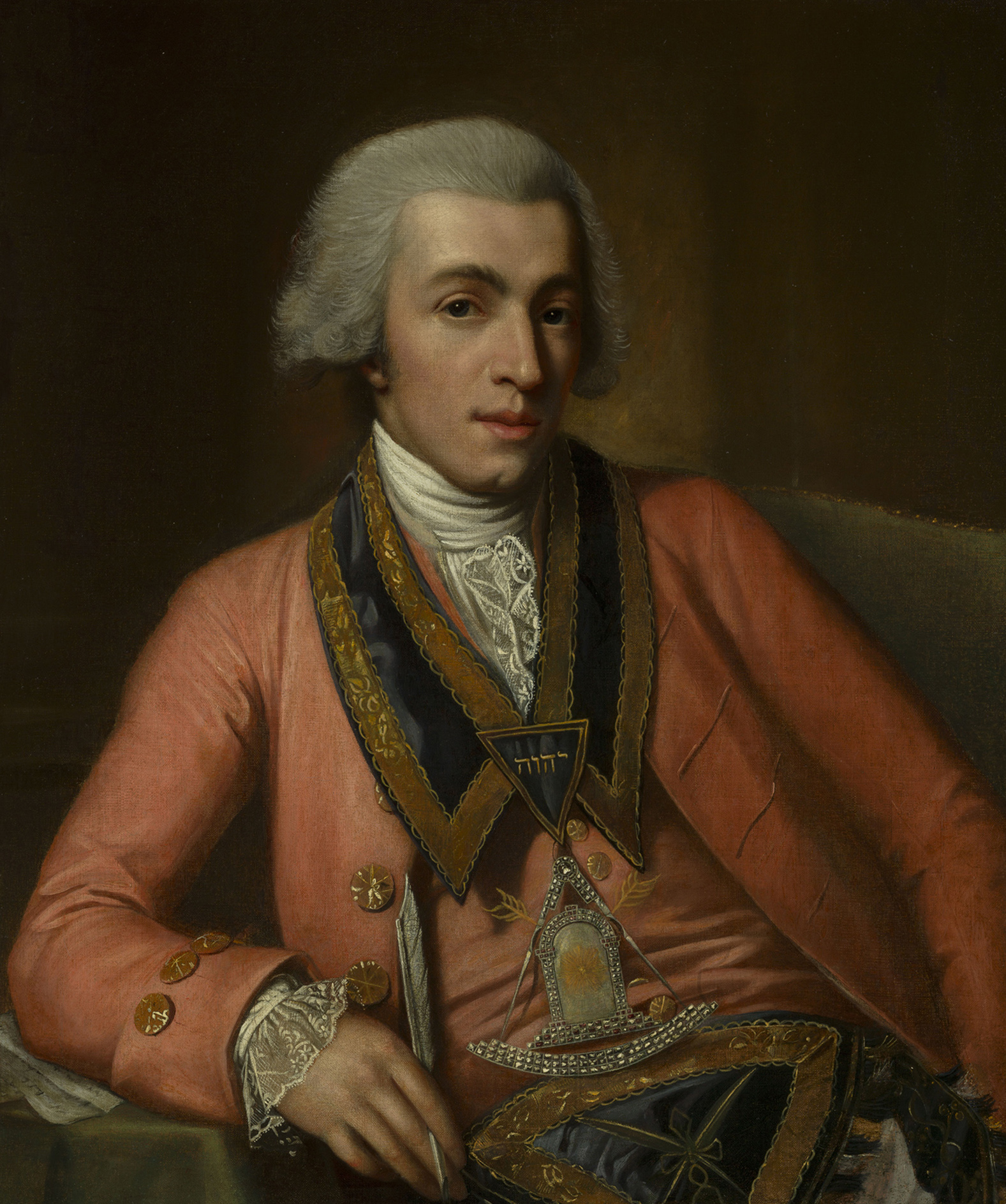
- Portrait in Masonic regalia

Provincial Grand Master of and for America
- In office January 14, 1771 – March 25, 1776

Personal details
- Born: c. 1724
- Died: March 25, 1776 (aged 52) Halifax, North Carolina
- Resting place: Royal White Hart Lodge, Halifax, North Carolina
- Spouse: Priscilla Hill (m. 1753)
- Children: 3
- Occupation: Merchant and politician

Joseph Montfort (c. 1724 – March 25, 1776) was a North Carolina merchant and politician who served as the Provincial Grand Master of and for America from 1771 until his death in 1776.

== Biography ==
Montfort settled in North Carolina in 1752 having migrated from Virginia in his early to mid-twenties, and married Priscilla, a daughter of Colonel Benjamin Hill, a planter and trader. Montfort became a successful merchant and planter and like others of his class was active in civic affairs, representing Halifax Town in the colonial assembly from 1766 to 1774 and eventually serving as a treasurer of the northern part of the colony.

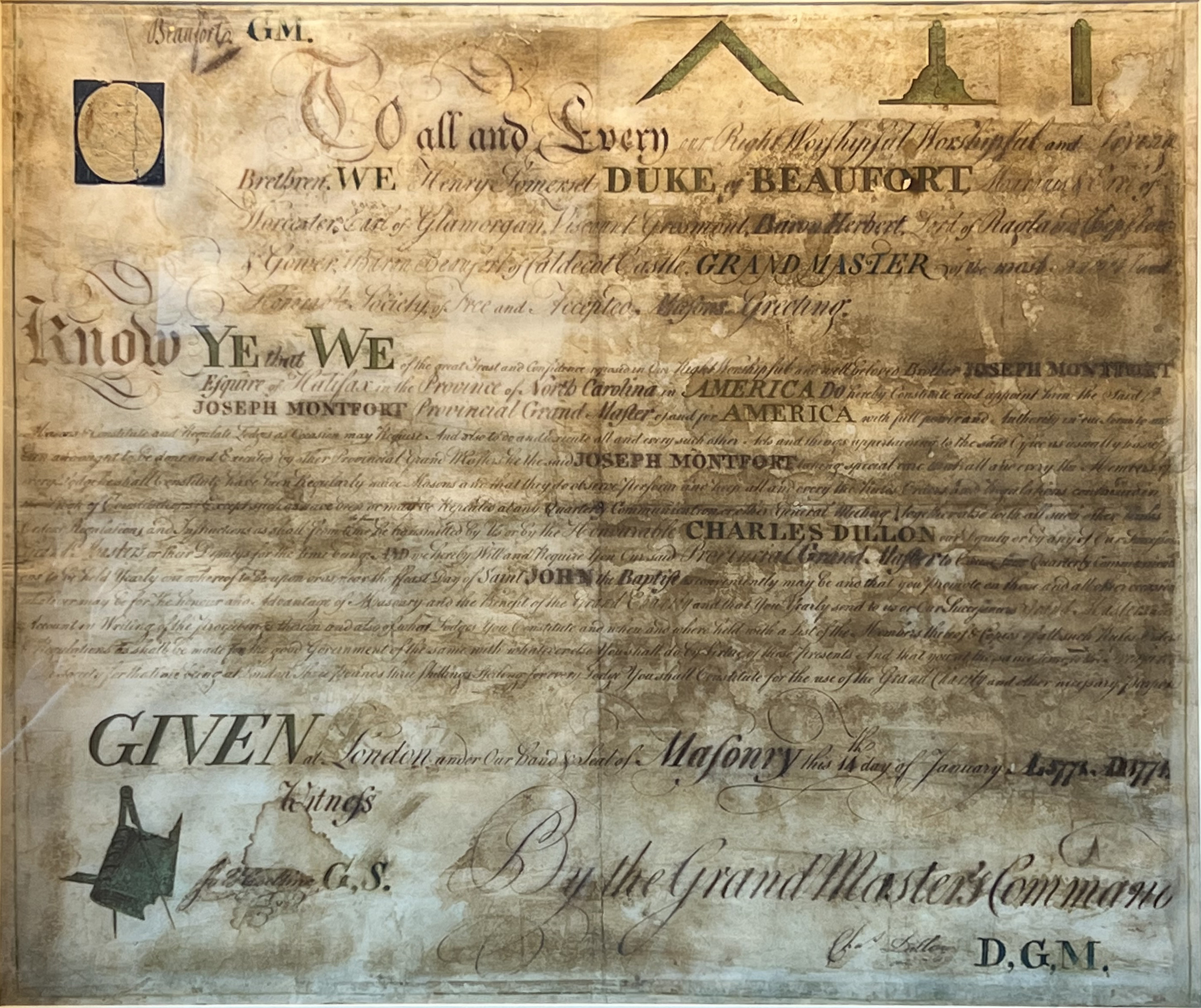
Joseph Montfort's certificate of appointment as Provincial Grand Master of and for America; signed by Deputy Grand Master of the Premier Grand Lodge of England Charles Dillon on January 14, 1771, in London.

Eventually becoming one of the wealthiest North Carolinians of the period, Montfort owned more than 30,000 acres scattered in tracts across the province. He was active in freemasonry from the 1760s and was instrumental in forming the Royal White Hart lodge in Halifax, North Carolina, and in obtaining a second warrant for the lodge from the Premier Grand Lodge of England under the hand of the Duke of Beaufort (1744–1803), Grand Master of the Premier Grand Lodge of England 1767–72, which Montfort presented to the lodge on his return to Halifax in May 1768.

Montfort visited England in the winter of 1767 with a fellow North Carolinian planter, Alexander McCulloh. Montfort was known for his extravagance in matters masonic and for purchasing expensive lodge furniture, glassware and porcelain, as well as for acquiring paintings, sculptures and other furnishings for himself to send back to North Carolina. His journey to London would not only have provided the opportunity to obtain a new and more prestigious lodge warrant from the Premier Grand Lodge of England, but also to advance his case as Provincial Grand Master.

Following the death of Benjamin Smith (1715–1770), Provincial Grand Master for North and South Carolina, Beaufort appointed Montfort ‘Provincial Grand Master of and for America’, although the relevant Grand Lodge Minutes are phrased Provincial G. M. for North Carolina’. The deputation is dated 14 January 1771. Montfort's gravestone at the Royal White Hart Lodge in Halifax reads ‘The highest masonic official ever reigning on this continent... the first, the last, the only Grand Master of America’.

Montfort was a delegate to the Second North Carolina Provincial Congress from Halifax Town. He died from pulmonary problems on March 25, 1776.

== Note ==
Some material was copied from Theo Johns Fine Art, which is available under a Attribution-ShareAlike 3.0 Unported license and GFDL.

Masonic offices
| New office | Provincial Grand Master of and for America; 1771–1776 | American Revolution |
