= Halifax, North Carolina =

- Town
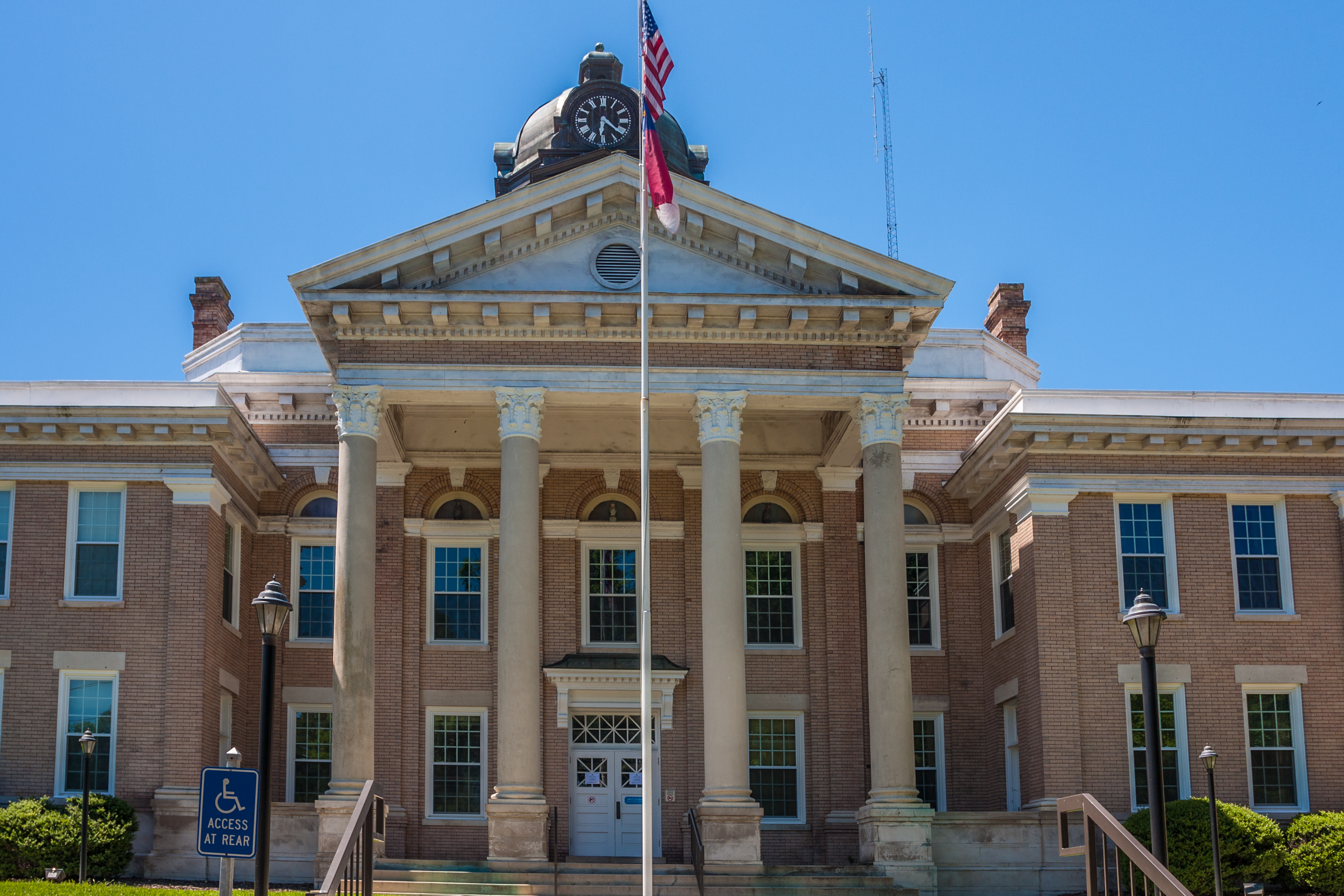
- Halifax County Courthouse

- Seal

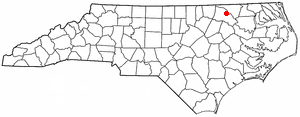
- Location of Halifax, North Carolina
- Coordinates: 36°19′32″N 77°35′24″W
- Country: United States
- State: North Carolina
- County: Halifax
- Established: 1757

Area
  - Total: 0.46 sq mi (1.18 km^{2})
  - Land: 0.46 sq mi (1.18 km^{2})
  - Water: 0 sq mi (0.00 km^{2})
- Elevation: 121 ft (37 m)

Population (2020)
  - Total: 170
  - Density: 371.8/sq mi (143.55/km^{2})
- Time zone: UTC-5 (Eastern (EST))
  - Summer (DST): UTC-4 (EDT)
- ZIP code: 27839
- Area code: 252
- FIPS code: 37-28920
- GNIS feature ID: 2406637
- Website: www.historichalifaxnc.com

Halifax is a town in and the county seat of Halifax County, North Carolina, United States. As of the 2020 census, Halifax had a population of 170. It is known as "The Birthplace of Freedom" for being the location for the April 12, 1776, adoption of the Halifax Resolves, which was the first official action by a colony calling for independence. Halifax is also home to the Halifax Historic District, a historic site operated by the North Carolina Department of Cultural Resources. Halifax is part of the Roanoke Rapids, North Carolina Micropolitan Statistical Area.

== History ==
Halifax was established in 1757. It was named for George Montagu-Dunk, 2nd Earl of Halifax, President of the Board of Trade from 1748 to 1761. In January 1759 it became the county seat of the new Halifax County. The town developed into a commercial and political center at the time of the American Revolution. North Carolina's Fourth Provincial Congress met in Halifax in the spring of 1776, and on April 12, 1776, adopted the Halifax Resolves.

On account of its size, the town of Halifax began sending a representative to the North Carolina General Assembly in 1760. The North Carolina Constitution of 1776 confirmed Halifax as one of six (later seven) "borough towns" entitled to representation in the Assembly. (Note: The other borough towns were Edenton, Hillsborough, New Bern, Salisbury, and Wilmington, with Fayetteville added in 1789.) Halifax did not send a representative to the 1825 General Assembly due to election violence between supporters of Jesse Atherton Bynum and Robert Potter which resulted in a fatal shooting. Borough towns were abolished as part of the North Carolina Constitutional Convention of 1835, and Halifax was subsequently represented in the General Assembly only at the county level or above.

The Church of the Immaculate Conception and the Michael Ferrall Family Cemetery, William R. Davie House, Eagle Tavern, Halifax County Courthouse, Halifax County Home and Tubercular Hospital, Halifax Historic District, Sally-Billy House, and St. Mark's Episcopal Church are listed on the National Register of Historic Places.

On March 9, 2015, an Amtrak passenger train collided with a tractor trailer in Halifax, with part of the train derailing. 55 passengers were injured.

== Geography ==
According to the United States Census Bureau, the town has a total area of 0.4 square miles (1.0 km^{2}), all land. Halifax is located on the Roanoke River, near the Fall Line between the Piedmont and Coastal Plain regions of North Carolina. This location near the head of navigation for the Roanoke, was important in the town's early development.

== Demographics ==
Historical population
Census	Pop.	Note	%±
1860	192		—
1870	429		123.4%
1880	376		−12.4%
1890	361		−4.0%
1900	306		−15.2%
1910	314		2.6%
1920	299		−4.8%
1930	321		7.4%
1940	374		16.5%
1950	346		−7.5%
1960	370		6.9%
1970	335		−9.5%
1980	253		−24.5%
1990	327		29.2%
2000	344		5.2%
2010	234		−32.0%
2020	170		−27.4%
U.S. Decennial Census

=== 2020 census ===
Halifax racial composition
Race	Number	Percentage
White (non-Hispanic)	111	65.29%
Black or African American (non-Hispanic)	51	30.0%
Other/Mixed	2	1.18%
Hispanic or Latino	6	3.53%

As of the 2020 United States census, there were 170 people, 82 households, and 45 families residing in the town.

=== 2000 census ===
As of the census of 2000, there were 344 people, 103 households, and 73 families residing in the town. Preliminary Data from the 2010 Census indicates a declining population. The population density was 761.5 inhabitants per square mile (294.0/km^{2}). There were 123 housing units at an average density of 272.3 per square mile (105.1/km^{2}). The racial makeup of the town was 63.37% White, 35.17% African American, 0.29% Native American, 0.58% from other races, and 0.58% from two or more races. Hispanic or Latino of any race were 0.58% of the population.

There were 103 households, out of which 29.1% had children under the age of 18 living with them, 64.1% were married couples living together, 3.9% had a female householder with no husband present, and 28.2% were non-families. 26.2% of all households were made up of individuals, and 11.7% had someone living alone who was 65 years of age or older. The average household size was 2.29 and the average family size was 2.76.

In the town, the population was spread out, with 17.7% under the age of 18, 15.1% from 18 to 24, 33.4% from 25 to 44, 19.2% from 45 to 64, and 14.5% who were 65 years of age or older. The median age was 36 years. For every 100 females, there were 126.3 males. For every 100 females age 18 and over, there were 137.8 males.

The median income for a household in the town was $36,429, and the median income for a family was $47,917. Males had a median income of $24,063 versus $29,000 for females. The per capita income for the town was $14,041. About 14.3% of families and 26.0% of the population were below the poverty line, including 23.3% of those under age 18 and 16.3% of those age 65 or over.

== Notable people ==
- William Cicero Allen (1859–1952), educator
- John Branch (1782–1863), politician
- Sarah Wales Jones Burton (1791–1872), First Lady of North Carolina
- John R. J. Daniel (1802–1868), politician
- Junius Daniel (1828–1864), military officer
- Lucille Gorham (1931–2012), civil rights activist
- Samuel E. Hogg (1783–1842), politician
- Bartholomew F. Moore (1801–1878), politician
