= Halifax District Brigade =

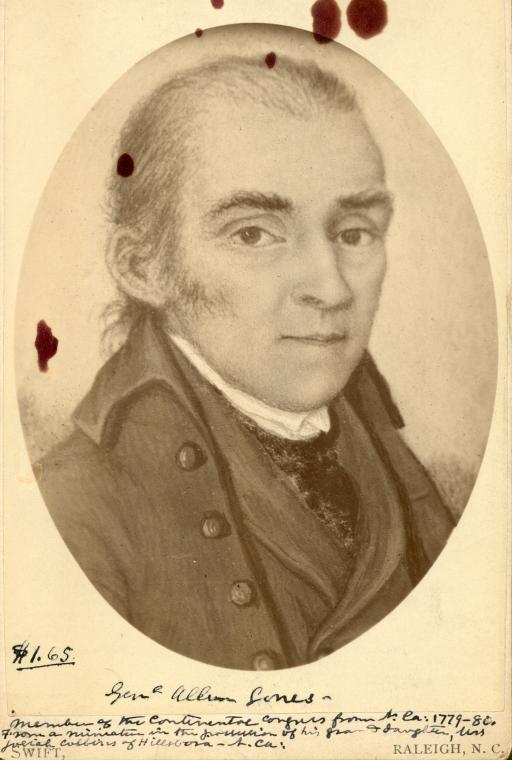
- Brigadier Allen Jones
- Active: 1776-1783
- Allegiance: (United States) North Carolina
- Branch: North Carolina militia
- Type: Militia

Commanders
- Notable commanders: 1. Brigadier General Allen Jones; 2. Brigadier General Thomas Eaton (Pro Tempore)

The Halifax District Brigade was an administrative division of the North Carolina militia during the American Revolutionary War (1776–1783). This unit was established by the North Carolina Provincial Congress on May 4, 1776, and disbanded at the end of the war.

== Commanders ==
Brigadier Allen Jones served as commander of the Halifax District Brigade from May 4, 1776, until after the war when he resigned his commission on December 3, 1787. Thomas Eaton temporarily filled general Jones command while he represented as North Carolina delegate to the Continental Congress in December 1779 and again while he was ill in 1781.

1. Brigadier General Allen Jones (1776–1783)
2. Brigadier General Thomas Eaton (Pro Tempore) (1779, 1781)

== Regiments ==
Unit	Subordinate Brigade	Created	Disbanded	Original Commander, Rank
North Carolina Militia and State Troops	Governor	1778	1783	Ashe, John Sr., M.G.
Martin County Regiment	Edenton, Halifax	1775	1783	Williams, William, Col
Halifax District Brigade	North Carolina Militia	1776	1783	Jones, Allen, B.G.
1st Battalion of Volunteers	Halifax	1776	1777	Sheppard, Abraham Sr, Col
2nd Battalion of Volunteers	Halifax	1776	1777	Locke, Francis, Col
Bute County Regiment	Halifax	1775	1779	Person, William, Col
Edgecombe County Regiment	Halifax	1775	1783	Haywood, William, Col
Franklin County Regiment	Halifax	1779	1783	Seawell, Benjamin, Col
Halifax County Regiment	Halifax	1775	1783	Bradford, John, Col
Nash County Regiment	Halifax	1777	1783	Clinch, James, Col
Northampton County Regiment	Halifax	1775	1783	Jones, Allen, Col
Warren County Regiment	Halifax	1779	1783	Eaton, Thomas, Col

=== 1st and 2nd Battalion of Volunteers ===
The North Carolina Provincial Congress authorized the creation of the 1st and 2nd Battalion of Volunteers on November 23, 1776, at the insistence of the Continental Congress, which was afraid of another British march to Charleston. The hastily assembled 1st and 2nd Battalion of Volunteers were assigned to Brigadier General Allen Jones of the newly created Halifax District Brigade of the North Carolina militia. Colonel Abraham Sheppard commanded the 1st Battalion and Lieutenant Colonel Francis Locke commanded the 2nd Battalion. They marched into South Carolina but the British failed to invade a second time. The term limits for these two battalions expired on April 10, 1777, so the units returned home because they were no longer needed.

=== Edgecombe County Regiment ===
The Edgecombe County Regiment was one of 35 existing North Carolina county militias to be authorized for organization on September 9, 1775, by the North Carolina Provincial Congress. All officers were appointed and commissioned by the provincial congress. This unit was active until the end of the war in 1783. The colonels and commandants of the regiment included:

- Colonel William Haywood (1775–1776, commandant)
- Colonel Exum Lewis (1776–1783, commandant)
- Colonel Jonas Johnston (1778–1779, 2nd colonel)
- Colonel Joseph J. Clinch (1779–1783, 2nd colonel)

=== Franklin County Regiment ===
When Franklin County was created out of part of Bute County on January 30, 1779, the Bute County Regiment was abolished and replace with the Franklin County Regiment. All officers were selected and commissioned by the Governor. The colonels and commandants of the regiment included:

- Colonel Benjamin Seawell (1779–1783, commandant)
- Colonel William Brickell (1781–1783, 2nd colonel)

=== Halifax County Regiment ===
The Halifax County Regiment was one of 35 existing North Carolina county militias to be authorized for organization on September 9, 1775, by the North Carolina Provincial Congress. All officers were appointed and commissioned by the provincial congress. This unit was active until the end of the war in 1783. The colonels and commandants of the regiment included:

- Colonel John Bradford (1775–1776)
- Colonel Willis Alston (1776–1778)
- Colonel Samuel Weldon (1778)
- Colonel John Whitaker (1779–1780)
- Colonel James Allen (1780–1783)

=== Nash County Regiment ===
When the North Carolina General Assembly Created Nash County from Edgecombe County on December 17, 1777, the also created the Nash County Regiment of the North Carolina militia. All officers were selected and commissioned by the Governor. The unit was active until the end of the war. The colonels and commandants of this regiment included:

- Colonel James Clinch (1777–1783)
- Colonel Thomas Hunter (1780–1783, 2nd colonel)

=== Northampton County Regiment ===
The Northampton County Regiment was one of 35 existing North Carolina county militias to be authorized for organization on September 9, 1775, by the North Carolina Provincial Congress. All officers were appointed and commissioned by the provincial congress. This unit was active until the end of the war in 1783. The colonels and commandants of the regiment included:

- Colonel Allen Jones (1775–1776), promoted to command of brigade
- Colonel William Eaton (1776–1780)
- Colonel Howell Edmunds (1780)
- Colonel Jeptha Atherton (1775–1783)
- Colonel Andrew Haynes (1781–1783, 2nd colonel)

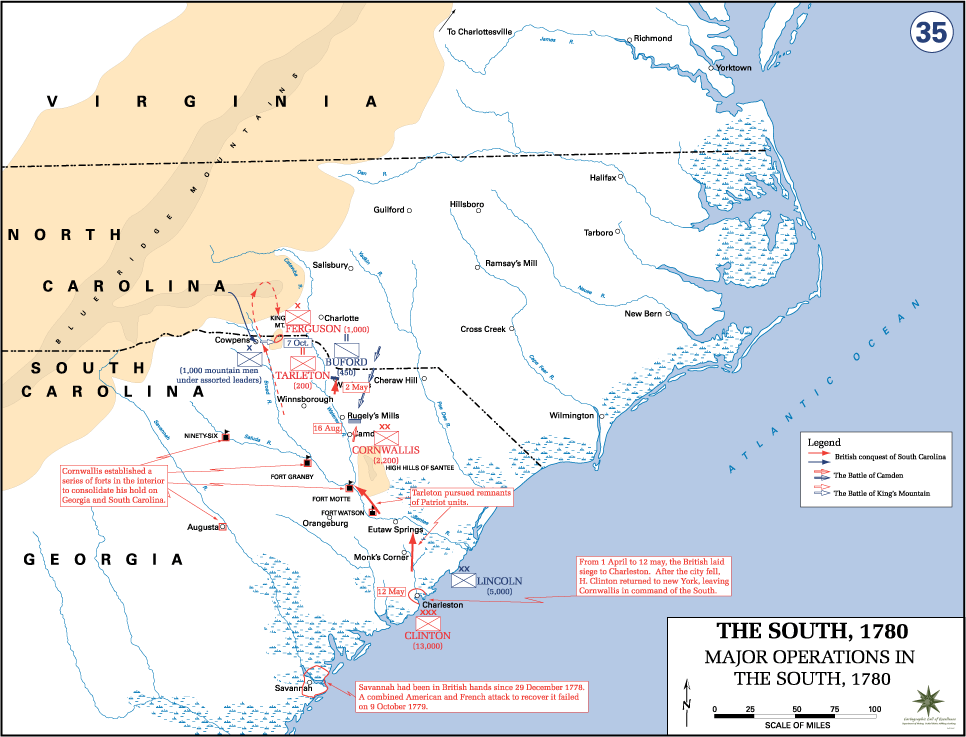
Major engagements in the Southern Campaign

== Engagements ==
Regiments of the Halifax District Brigade were involved in 22 known engagements (battles, sieges, and skirmishes), including two in George, 11 in South Carolina, 8 in North Carolina, and one in Florida. One or more companies of these regiments were involved in each engagement.

Order	Date	Battle	State	Edgecombe	Franklin	Halifax	Martin	Nash	Northampton	Warren
1	2/27/1776	Battle of Moore's Creek Bridge	NC	x		x			x	
2	6/28/1776	Battle of Fort Moultrie #1	SC			x				
3	9/1/1776 to 9/30/1776	Florida Expedition	FL			x				
4	3/3/1779	Battle of Briar Creek	GA	x	x	x	x	x	x	x
5	6/20/1779	Battle of Stono Ferry	SC	x	x	x			x	x
6	3/28/1780 to 5/12/1780	Siege of Charleston 1780	SC	x	x	x		x		
7	6/20/1780	Battle of Ramsour's Mill	NC	x						
8	8/11/1780	Battle of Little Lynches Creek	SC		x				x	x
9	8/16/1780	Battle of Camden	SC	x	x	x	x	x	x	x
10	9/26/1780	Battle of Charlotte	NC		x	x				x
11	12/4/1780	Battle of Rugeley's Mills #2	SC	x	x	x				x
12	1/17/1781	Battle of Cowpens	SC							x
13	3/15/1781	Battle of Guilford Court House	NC	x	x	x	x	x	x	x
14	4/25/1781	Battle of Hobkirk's Hill	SC	x	x		x	x		x
15	5/7/1781 to 5/11/1781	Battle of Halifax	NC			x				
16	5/7/1781	Battle of Swift Creek & Fishing Creek	NC		x					
17	5/12/1781	Battle of Fort Motte	SC					x		x
18	5/21/1781 to 6/19/1781	Siege of Ninety-Six 1781	SC					x		
19	5/24/1781 to 6/1/1781	Siege of Augusta	GA			x				x
20	8/2/1781	Battle of Rockfish Creek	NC	x	x			x		
21	9/8/1781	Battle of Eutaw Springs	SC	x						
22	9/12/1781	Battle of Hillsborough	NC	x						
