= Jeptha Atherton =

American politician and soldier

Colonel Jeptha Atherton
- Born: c. 1733 probably Bermuda
- Died: January 19, 1787 (aged 53–54); Northampton County, North Carolina
- Spouse(s): Sarah Tynes (m. 1760) Mary Elizabeth "Betsie" Thorpe (m. 1763)
- Children: Sarah Atherton (Bell); Penelope Atherton (Brunson); Elizabeth "Dorothy" Atherton (Dawson); Mary Atherton (Bynum); Temperance Atherton (Barnes); Frances Atherton (Alston); Jessee Atherton
- Relatives: Jesse Atherton Bynum (grandson); Archibald S. Dobbins (grandson-in-law)
- Military career
- Allegiance: North Carolina
- Branch: Militia
- Rank: Major; Lieutenant Colonel; Colonel
- Unit: Northampton County Regiment
- Commands: Northampton County Regiment
- Conflicts: Battle of Moore's Creek Bridge; Battle of Briar Creek; Battle of Little Lynches Creek; Battle of Camden

Colonel Jeptha Atherton (c. 1733–1787) was a North Carolina landowner, slave owner, politician, and militia officer in Northampton County, North Carolina, during the American Revolutionary War. He represented Northampton County at the North Carolina Provincial Congress and in the North Carolina House of Commons, and rose through the militia ranks from major to colonel, commanding the Northampton County Regiment for the final years of the war. Atherton was a founding landowner of what became Jackson, North Carolina, donating the use of his land for the county’s courthouse in 1762 and establishing a plantation that included a tavern, store, and gristmill. He is also remembered as the owner and breeder of Janus, a British-born stallion regarded as a foundation sire of the American Quarter Horse.

== Profession ==
Jeptha Atherton was born ante 1735, probably in Bermuda. He settled in Northampton Courthouse, Northampton County, Province of North Carolina in 1762, near what is now the courthouse square in Jackson. Atherton allowed the use of his land (which he had purchased from Barnaby Thomas, a brother in law of Willie Jones) for county court meetings, while establishing a large plantation, including horse breeding and stables, a gristmill, a tavern, and a store.

He became a prominent local farmer, politician, and later, the Northampton Regiments' first Major during the Revolutionary War period.

By the time of the First Census of the United States, Atherton held a total of 35 slaves. This was perceived to be a considerable number by those from the Upland South, where men were classified as planters if they held 20 or more slaves. His last will and testament makes a big emphasis on the redistribution of his slaves amongst his descendants following his death.

=== Horse breeder ===
Atherton was one of the first residents of Northampton County to take a strong interest in blooded horses. Horse racing was a popular spectator sport in the Province of North Carolina. Many wealthy planters dominated the sport since they had the resources to import, breed and train expensive English breeding stock and race horses. Atherton as part of the North Carolina elite was able to display his wealth on the track. He established a large plantation at Northampton Courthouse, where he bred and raced horses, and was the owner of a nationally famous British born stallion, Janus, who was a grandson of the Godolphin Arabian. He purchased Janus from Mildred Willis between late 1771 and the start of 1772.

Janus was quick and compact and is acknowledged as the foundation sire of the American Quarter Horse. Janus was a chestnut horse born in England in 1746 and imported to Virginia Colony by Mordecai Booth in 1752, and resold, before moving to North Carolina. Janus, who measured in excess of 14 hands, would have looked different from the other horses at the time; compact yet large boned. His muscular back legs helped him run fast.

Atherton enthusiasm for horse racing was shared by many of his neighbors. He ran Mud Colt and Big Filly (bred by Turner Bynum, his son-in-law), in quarter races against Willie Jones (statesman) two horses, Paoli and Trick'em, losing to both. He bred Caelus and Harlot, later owned by his son-in-law James Barnes.

On March 18, 1773, Atherton placed an advertisement in The Virginia Gazette; in it he refers to Janus being in North Carolina. The horse, Celer, foaled in 1774 was considered to be his "best son". On March 20, 1775, Atherton placed one of many advertisements in the Virginia Gazette to put Janus out to stud. Atherton retained ownership of Janus until the horse’s death in 1780, aged 34, having passed his many qualities to all his foals, including the celebrated American Quarter Running Horse Spadille.

Not all his horses were up to standard. On March 26, 1782, the Governor of North Carolina, Thomas Burke wrote to him advising that the horse he dispatched was unfit for Military service and requested another.

== Chronology of his efforts during the Revolutionary War ==
Atherton's colonial service began when he received his Commission as Major of the Northampton Regiment from Governor William Tryon on December 6, 1770, in New Bern.

Atherton then became a patriot who served from 1775 to 1783 in the North Carolina Militia. His name is listed as Jeptha Atherton or Eatherton in some of the militia service records.

- September 9, 1775: The Northampton County Regiment was one of 35 existing North Carolina county militias to be authorized for organization on September 9, 1775, by the North Carolina Provincial Congress. Atherton was commissioned as a 1st Major under Colonel Allen Jones, who lead the regiment from 1775 and 1776).
- February 27, 1776: Atherton led a small contingent of the Northampton County Regiment of Militia at the Battle of Moore's Creek Bridge.
- April 22, 1776: Commissioned as a Lt. Col. under Colonel William Eaton in the Northampton County Regiment of Militia.
- March 3, 1779: Atherton was attached to Col. Thomas Eaton's Warren County Regiment of Militia during the Battle of Briar Creek, Georgia.
- 1780: Atherton was commissioned as a full Colonel and served as a second colonel alongside Colonel Howell Edmunds, in the Northampton County Regiment of Militia. When Col. Howell Edmunds resigned at the end of 1780, Atherton became the Commandant over the Northampton County Regiment of Militia, a position he retained until the end of the war.
- August 11, 1780: Atherton led the Northampton County Regiment of Militia at the Battle of Little Lynches Creek, South Carolina and Battle of Camden, South Carolina on August 16, 1780.

== Political and civic career ==
Atherton was appointed as a Justice of the Peace in Beatie County in 1739. As the population increased, Northampton separated to form its own County, with Atherton retaining this civic position.

=== House of Burgesses ===
Atherton served in the Province of North Carolina House of Burgesses in 1773 as the elected representative of the Northampton County.

=== Provincial Congress ===
He was first elected to represent Northampton County in the North Carolina Provincial Congress as a delegate to the Second North Carolina Provincial Congress in New Bern, North Carolina, in April 1775. He was again elected to the Third North Carolina Provincial Congress in August 1775 in Hillsborough, the Fourth North Carolina Provincial Congress in Halifax in April 1776 and the Fifth North Carolina Provincial Congress of November 1776, which created the North Carolina State Constitution. He also represented Northampton County in the North Carolina House of Commons during 1777, but he was soon elected as Northampton County Clerk and he stepped down from the House of Commons.

== Personal life ==
Atherton married Sarah Tynes on September 13, 1760.

Atherton married Mary Elizabeth "Betsie" Thorpe, the widow of Thomas Jarrett at St. Luke's Parrish, Southampton County, Virginia. Some sources state that they only had one daughter. His Last Will and Testament says otherwise.

=== Family ===
Once he moved from the Colony of Virginia to North Carolina, Atherton secured greater influence by marrying his daughters into influential families, such as the Dawson's, Barnes, Alston and Bynum's.

It is unclear whether his daughter Penelope (Atherton) Brunson came with her father to North Carolina. Her son, Asabel Brunson Jr was killed during the Battle of New Orleans in 1815.

His daughter by his marriage to Betsie; Elisabeth "Dorothy" Atherton (1764-1789), married John Dawson Jr, who represented Northampton in the North Carolina House of Commons (1780-1782) and then Halifax (1787-1798). John Dawson Jr.‘s father John Dawson Sr had moved from Virginia to Bertie County, North Carolina in 1732, and within 2 years was a representative in the General Assembly, and a later a member of the Governors Council. Highly influential on local matters he was appointed Colonel of the Northampton Regiment towards the end of the Spanish Alarm period which lasted 9 years (1739-1748). Their son Jesse Atherton Dawson became a wealthy planter

Atherton's granddaughter, Mary Patience Dawson married Archibald S. Dobbins, a Colonel in the Confederate Army.

His other daughter, Temperance Atherton, married James Barnes. They had 2 children. Descendants include David Collin Barnes (1875-1959) who was elected to the N.C. House of Representatives and the N.C. State Senate.

Frances Atherton (1770-1830), married Gideon Alston (1765-1831)

Mary Atherton, who married Turner Bynum. One son: Jesse Atherton Bynum (May 23, 1797 – September 23, 1868) was a Congressional Representative from North Carolina; born in Halifax County, North Carolina, May 23, 1797; attended Princeton College in 1817 and 1818; studied law; was admitted to the bar and commenced practice in Halifax, North Carolina; member of the house of commons of North Carolina in 1822, 1823, and 1826–1829; elected as a Jacksonian to the Twenty-second and Twenty-third Congresses and as a Democrat to the two succeeding Congresses (March 4, 1833 – March 3, 1841); moved to Alexandria, Louisiana, where he engaged in agricultural pursuits; died in Alexandria, La., September 23, 1868; interment in Rapides Cemetery, Pineville, Louisiana.

Atherton’s only son, Jessee Atherton, died without issue — recorded in his father’s will using the Latin phrase dēcessit sine prōle (“died without issue”).

=== Death and legacy ===
Atherton died on January 19, 1787, in Northampton County, North Carolina. His will was proven in June of that year. A number of enslaved people were mentioned in his last will and testament.

On July 2, 1798, the North-Carolina Journal of Halifax reported on page 4: "For lease - - Land and Plantation at Northampton Courthouse formerly belonging to Col. Jeptha Atherton upon which is a good dwelling house - - convenient outhouses - - also a grist mill. Besides - - immediately at the courthouse there is a house which is now used as a tavern and is from its location well calculated for that purpose. And - - a storehouse near it which is well situated for a country store."

A street in Jackson, NC bears the Atherton name, near the site of his former plantation and courthouse land.
