= Middleburg, North Carolina =

- Town
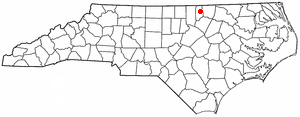
- Location of Middleburg, North Carolina
- Coordinates: 36°23′56″N 78°19′24″W
- Country: United States
- State: North Carolina
- County: Vance

Area
  - Total: 0.78 sq mi (2.03 km^{2})
  - Land: 0.78 sq mi (2.03 km^{2})
  - Water: 0 sq mi (0.00 km^{2})
- Elevation: 476 ft (145 m)

Population (2020)
  - Total: 101
  - Density: 128.6/sq mi (49.67/km^{2})
- Time zone: UTC-5 (Eastern (EST))
  - Summer (DST): UTC-4 (EDT)
- ZIP code: 27556
- Area code: 252
- FIPS code: 37-42640
- GNIS feature ID: 2406156

Middleburg is a town in Vance County, North Carolina, United States. As of the 2020 census, Middleburg had a population of 101. It was in Warren County and known as Middleburgh prior to the establishment of Vance County in 1881.

== History ==
Middleburg Baptist Church was established on November 27, 1881. The first pastor was Reverend M.V. McDuffy.

The Pleasant Hill/Hawkins House is located near Middleburg. It was listed on the National Register of Historic Places in 1979. The original dwelling was probably built by Colonel Philemon Hawkins II, and birthplace of Governor William Hawkins (1777-1819).

== Geography ==
According to the United States Census Bureau, the town has a total area of 0.6 square mile (1.5 km^{2}), all land.

Middleburg is located roughly halfway between New York and Atlanta, which is possibly the etymology of the town.

== Demographics ==
Historical population
Census	Pop.	Note	%±
1880	84		—
1900	169		—
1910	117		−30.8%
1920	104		−11.1%
1930	138		32.7%
1940	181		31.2%
1950	217		19.9%
1960	170		−21.7%
1970	149		−12.4%
1980	185		24.2%
1990	131		−29.2%
2000	162		23.7%
2010	133		−17.9%
2020	101		−24.1%
U.S. Decennial Census

=== 2020 census ===
Middleburg town, North Carolina – Racial and ethnic composition Note: the US Census treats Hispanic/Latino as an ethnic category. This table excludes Latinos from the racial categories and assigns them to a separate category. Hispanics/Latinos may be of any race.
Race / Ethnicity (NH = Non-Hispanic)	Pop 2000	Pop 2010	Pop 2020	% 2000	% 2010	% 2020
White alone (NH)	53	39	22	32.72%	29.32%	21.78%
Black or African American alone (NH)	103	85	70	63.58%	63.91%	69.31%
Native American or Alaska Native alone (NH)	0	0	0	0.00%	0.00%	0.00%
Asian alone (NH)	0	0	0	0.00%	0.00%	0.00%
Native Hawaiian or Pacific Islander alone (NH)	0	0	0	0.00%	0.00%	0.00%
Other race alone (NH)	0	0	0	0.00%	0.00%	0.00%
Mixed race or Multiracial (NH)	0	5	2	0.00%	3.76%	1.98%
Hispanic or Latino (any race)	6	4	7	3.70%	3.01%	6.93%
Total	162	133	101	100.00%	100.00%	100.00%

=== 2000 census ===
As of the census of 2000, there were 162 people, 54 households, and 46 families residing in the town. The population density was 284.6 inhabitants per square mile (109.9/km^{2}). There were 56 housing units at an average density of 98.4 per square mile (38.0/km^{2}). The racial makeup of the town was 34.57% White, 63.58% African American, 1.23% from other races, and 0.62% from two or more races. Hispanic or Latino of any race were 3.70% of the population.

There were 54 households, out of which 35.2% had children under the age of 18 living with them, 55.6% were married couples living together, 24.1% had a female householder with no husband present, and 13.0% were non-families. 13.0% of all households were made up of individuals, and 3.7% had someone living alone who was 65 years of age or older. The average household size was 3.00 and the average family size was 3.26.

In the town, the population was spread out, with 30.9% under the age of 18, 8.6% from 18 to 24, 29.0% from 25 to 44, 22.2% from 45 to 64, and 9.3% who were 65 years of age or older. The median age was 31 years. For every 100 females, there were 97.6 males. For every 100 females age 18 and over, there were 103.6 males.

The median income for a household in the town was $25,313, and the median income for a family was $28,750. Males had a median income of $21,563 versus $18,125 for females. The per capita income for the town was $11,552. About 4.2% of families and 5.0% of the population were below the poverty line, including 10.5% of those under the age of eighteen and none of those 65 or over.

== Notable people ==
- Tiny Broadwick, pioneer parachutist and inventor of the ripcord
- John Clifford Hawkins, second ever African American member of the New York State Assembly
- William B. Henderson, state legislator in North Carolina
