= Thomas Eaton (general) =

American politician

Brigadier General Thomas Eaton
- Born: c. 1739; North Carolina
- Died: June 1809 (aged 69–70); Eaton's Ferry, Warren County, North Carolina
- Spouse(s): Anna Bland; Anne Stith; Elizabeth Jones
- Military career
- Allegiance: Kingdom of Great Britain; Continental Congress; United States of America
- Branch: North Carolina state militia
- Service years: 1771, 1776–1781
- Rank: Brigadier General (Pro Tempore)
- Commands: Bute County Regiment (1776-1779); Warren County Regiment (1779-1783); Halifax District Brigade (1779, 1781)
- Conflicts: War of the Regulation; American Revolutionary War: Battle of Brier Creek; Battle of Guilford Courthouse

Thomas Eaton (c. 1739 – June 1809) was a military officer in the North Carolina militia during the War of the Regulation in 1771 and American Revolutionary War from 1775 to 1784. He was a member of the North Carolina Provincial Congress and North Carolina House of Commons for several terms simultaneously with his military service. Eaton was a member of the North Carolina Council of State under Governor Richard Caswell. Eaton commanded soldiers in the battles of Brier Creek and Guilford Courthouse. At the time of the 1790 census, Eaton was one of the largest slaveholders in North Carolina.

== Early life and War of the Regulation ==
Eaton was born to William Eaton and Mary Rives, who had moved to North Carolina from Prince George County, Virginia. Eaton was married three times, marrying his first wife, Anna Bland, in 1761. That marriage bore one daughter, Anna, in 1763. After purchasing land in Bute County, North Carolina, Eaton represented that county in the colonial North Carolina Assembly from 1769 to 1771. In 1771, Governor William Tryon named Eaton a colonel in the Bute County militia during the War of the Regulation. The militia organization supported the governor against the agrarian uprising in the piedmont region of North Carolina.

Eaton served as Bute County's representative in the Provincial Council, which became the Council of Safety, between 1775 and 1776. That body exercised executive powers in the state prior to the election of the state's first governor after the start of the American Revolution. Eaton served as President pro tempore of the Council of Safety. Also beginning in 1775, Eaton was a delegate to the Second, Third, and Fifth North Carolina Provincial Congresses. The Fourth Provincial Congress, of which Eaton was not a delegate, appointed him a colonel in the state's militia.

== American Revolutionary War ==
Service record:

- Halifax District Brigade of militia: 1779 to 1781
- Colonel over the Bute County Regiment of militia and the Warren County Regiment of militia
- Appointed 11/4/1779 as Brigadier Pro Tempore, to replace Allen Jones, away on business.
- Re-appointed as Brigadier Pro Tempore in early 1781.
- Returned to being Colonel over the Warren County Regiment of Militia.
- Engaged at the Battle of Guilford Court House

After his appointment as a colonel in 1776, Eaton was elected to the North Carolina Council of State, an executive body elected by the North Carolina General Assembly which assisted the governor in managing the state's affairs. Eaton served under Richard Caswell in that governor's terms as first and fifth governor of the post-Revolution state, and was re-elected to the Council in 1779 and 1784. In between his terms as a councillor, Eaton served with the militia in the southern theater against the British Army and its local Loyalist tributaries, but was primarily a politician, and had less military experience than many of his colleagues.

On March 3, 1779, Eaton was in command of a regiment of militia at the Patriot defeat at the Battle of Brier Creek in Georgia. At Brier Creek, the Patriot forces were forced to retreat, and Eaton lost a pair of distinctive riding boots, which were retrieved by Loyalist Colonel John Hamilton, who had commanded the Royal North Carolina Regiment. During a dinner party after the revolution, Hamilton reportedly attempted to return the boots to their owner, only to be rebuffed violently. In November 1779, he was promoted to the rank of brigadier general by the North Carolina Assembly. On March 15, 1781, Eaton commanded the Halifax District Brigade of the North Carolina militia at the Battle of Guilford Courthouse, where he was positioned beside the Hillsborough District Brigade of militia under Brigadier General John Butler. Commanding General Nathanael Greene considered the 1,000 North Carolina militiamen under Butler and Eaton's command to be his least-reliable troops. Eaton, as well as Butler, attempted to stop the men under their command from fleeing the field early during that battle, but could not prevent a large number of North Carolina militia from routing.

== Later life and death ==
After the death of Anna in 1781, Eaton married his second wife, Anne Stith, with whom he had two sons. Eaton would find occasion to remarry for a final time with Elizabeth Jones, a cousin of Continental Congress delegates Willie and Allen Jones. According to the 1790 census, Eaton was one of the largest slaveholders in North Carolina, and his substantial landholdings in Bute County were a part of Warren County after Bute was divided in 1779. Eaton died in June 1809.
