= John Hamilton (Loyalist) =

- Born: Scotland
- Died: December 12, 1816; England
- Military career
- Allegiance: Kingdom of Great Britain
- Branch: British Army
- Service years: 1777–1783
- Rank: Lieutenant Colonel
- Commands: Royal North Carolina Regiment
- Conflicts: American Revolutionary War: Siege of Savannah; Battle of Brier Creek; Battle of Kettle Creek; Battle of Stono Ferry; Battle of Monck's Corner; Battle of Hanging Rock; Battle of Camden; Battle of Guilford Courthouse; Battle of Yorktown

John Hamilton (died December 12, 1816) was the commander of the Royal North Carolina Regiment of Loyalist provincial volunteers during the American Revolutionary War from 1777 to 1783. Prior to the Revolution, Hamilton was a successful merchant in Halifax, North Carolina, with business interests throughout the Province of North Carolina. Hamilton commanded soldiers in several major engagements, including the battles of Brier Creek, Camden, Guilford Courthouse, and Yorktown. After the conclusion of the war, Hamilton was made British consul to Norfolk, Virginia, one of only three Loyalists to receive consular positions in the newly created United States.

== Early life and business ==
Born in Scotland, Hamilton immigrated to Nansemond County, Virginia at some point prior to 1760, where other members of his family had already established businesses. Hamilton formed a partnership with two of his brothers, Archibald and William, who had set up a trading center near Halifax in North Carolina. Hamilton's venture extended credit to a number of planters throughout the burgeoning Piedmont region of the province, which has been cited as a major factor in that region's development during the colonial era. Much of the firm's activities relied on regular trade with and credit from the rest of the British Empire, and so the beginning of the American Revolution signalled the end of Hamilton's commercial successes.

== American Revolution ==
In August 1777, Hamilton refused to take an oath of allegiance to the newly formed state of North Carolina. Due to the animosity against him for his Loyalist beliefs, Hamilton was forced to wind down his business activities in the state, and eventually left from New Bern on October 25, 1777 aboard a newly purchased merchant ship. According to a later accounting generated by Hamilton and his brother, their business suffered approximately £200,000 in losses due to the Revolution.

Hamilton arrived in British-controlled New York and served as a courier in the British Army for Generals William Howe and Henry Clinton before being authorized a commission as an officer to recruit Loyalist soldiers in the southern theater. Hamilton's rank would be dependent upon the number of men he would be able to recruit. The recruitment process began after the British Capture of Savannah, when Hamilton recruited approximately 30 Loyalist survivors of the battle of Kettle Creek, Georgia to serve as the basis for his regiment of "North Carolina Volunteers".

Eventually the unit was named the Royal North Carolina Regiment, and had eventually had as many as men. Hamilton and his regiment saw action at the Siege of Savannah, as well as the battles of Briar Creek, Kettle Creek (Hamilton may have meant only the battle of Carr's fort that preceded Kettle Creek), Stono Ferry, Monck's Corner, Hanging Rock, Camden, and the Guilford Courthouse. Hamilton lost a pair of pistols to Colonel Andrew Pickens at the battle at Carr's fort on February 10, 1779. Today those pistols are on display at the Museum of Art and History in Pickens, South Carolina.

At Briar Creek on March 3, 1779, Hamilton recovered a pair of distinctive riding boots belonging to Patriot militia general and fellow North Carolinian Thomas Eaton, who had lost them in that battle. When Hamilton attempted to return the boots to Eaton at a dinner party in 1809, Eaton responded violently, reportedly beating the Loyalist with the very same boots. During the confrontation at Stono Ferry on June 20, 1779, Hamilton commanded his regiment at the center of the British line, behind redoubts set up to protect the withdrawal of the main British Army. Hamilton's Royal North Carolina Regiment held firm along with the 71st (Highland) Regiment of Foot, and dealt a defeat to the attacking Continental Army forces commanded by Benjamin Lincoln. At Hanging Rock, though, Hamilton's regiment was routed during the initial Patriot attack, but he rallied his command for an attempted stand along with other Loyalist units. The rallied Loyalist units were dispersed by a cavalry charge commanded by militia leader William Richardson Davie, and the Patriot forces were permitted to ransack the British camp.

Hamilton surrendered his regiment, with 80 of its 142 survivors, after the Siege of Yorktown. After his surrender, Hamilton was sent to Saint Augustine in British Florida. When Florida was ceded to Spain in the Treaty of Paris that ended the American Revolutionary War, Hamilton quashed talks of mutiny among the Loyalist soldiers and residents of British Florida, who sought to remain there under British rule and were then evacuated to Nova Scotia.

In the course of his service in the Revolutionary War, Hamilton was wounded three times. General Charles Cornwallis, who had at one point during the war called Hamilton a "blockhead", would later commend Hamilton for his conduct and service to the British Army.

== Post-war career and death ==
The Royal North Carolina Regiment was disbanded in November 1783, and Hamilton went to London. At some point prior to 1785, Hamilton married and had one child, but little is known of his family after that date. Between 1784 and 1790, Hamilton attempted to receive compensation from the British government for the losses he sustained in the Revolution, eventually receiving £13,630 along with his brother. In 1790, Hamilton was appointed the British consul at Norfolk, Virginia, one of only three former Loyalist military leaders to be given diplomatic posts in the United States. At the outbreak of the War of 1812, Hamilton was recalled to England, where he died in 1816.
