= John Branch =

American politician (1782–1863)

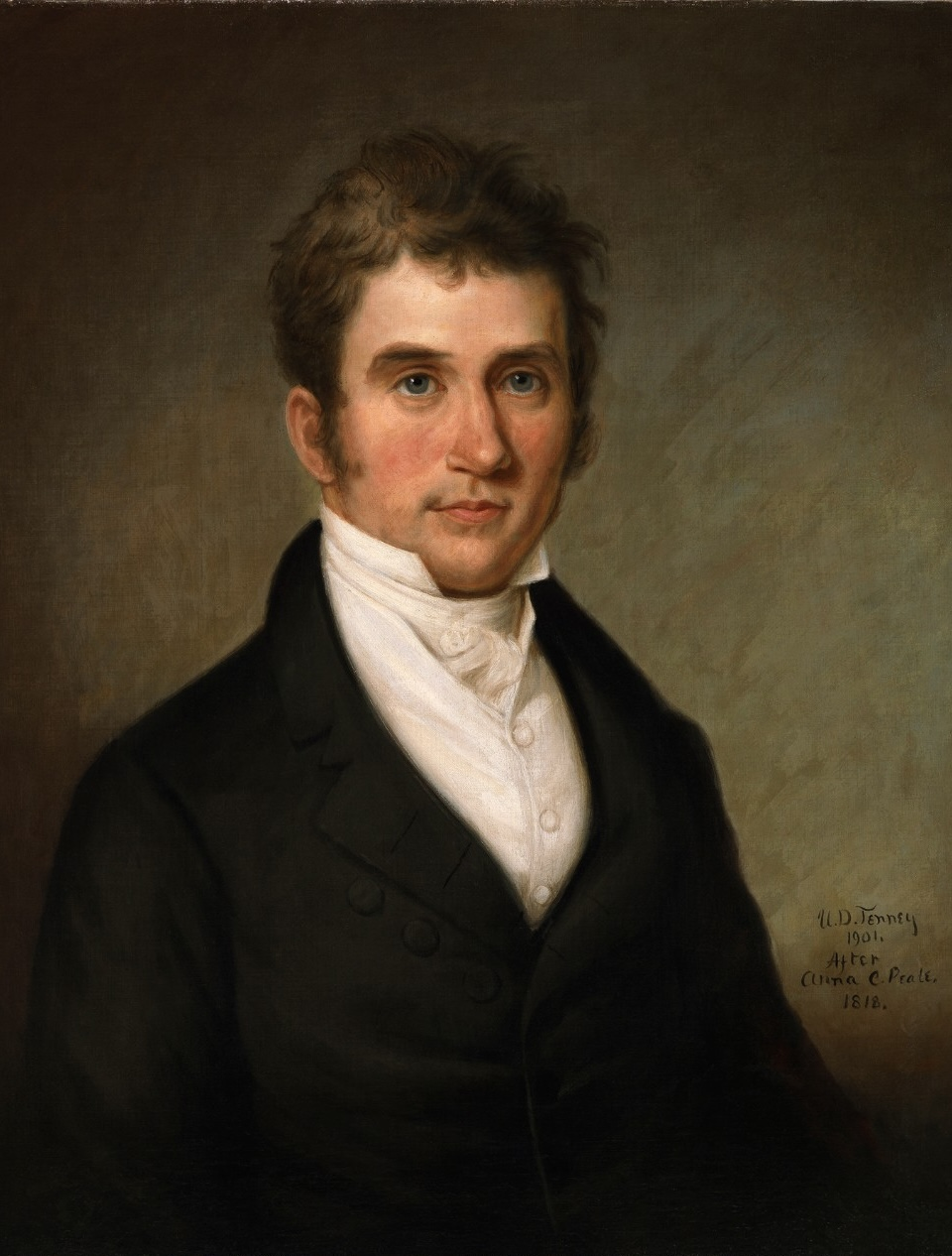

Territorial Governor of Florida
- In office August 11, 1844 – June 25, 1845
- Preceded by: Richard K. Call
- Succeeded by: William Dunn Moseley (as Governor of Florida)

Member of the U.S. House of Representatives from North Carolina's 2nd district
- In office May 12, 1831 – March 3, 1833
- Preceded by: Willis Alston
- Succeeded by: Jesse Bynum

8th United States Secretary of the Navy
- In office March 9, 1829 – May 12, 1831
- President: Andrew Jackson
- Preceded by: Samuel L. Southard
- Succeeded by: Levi Woodbury

United States Senator from North Carolina
- In office March 4, 1823 – March 9, 1829
- Preceded by: Montfort Stokes
- Succeeded by: Bedford Brown

Judge for the Western District of Florida
- In office 1822
- Appointed by: James Monroe

19th Governor of North Carolina
- In office December 6, 1817 – December 7, 1820
- Preceded by: William Miller
- Succeeded by: Jesse Franklin

Speaker of the North Carolina Senate
- In office 1815-1817

Member of the North Carolina Senate from Halifax County
- In office 1811-1817
- In office 1822
- In office 1834

North Carolina Commissioner for Valuation of Land, Dwellings and Enumeration of Slaves Third District
- In office 1799
- Appointed by: William Richardson Davie

Personal details
- Born: November 4, 1782 Halifax, North Carolina, U.S.
- Died: January 4, 1863 (aged 80) Enfield, North Carolina, C.S.
- Party: Democratic-Republican (before 1825); Jacksonian (1825–1837); Democratic (1837–1863)
- Spouse(s): Elizabeth Forte (Died 1851); Mary Jordan Bond
- Children: 7
- Education: University of North Carolina, Chapel Hill (BA)

John Branch Jr. (November 4, 1782 – January 4, 1863) was an American politician who served as U.S. Senator, Secretary of the Navy, the 19th governor of the state of North Carolina, and was the sixth and last governor of the Florida Territory.

== Biography ==
Branch was born in Halifax County, North Carolina, on November 4, 1782, the son of wealthy landowners. Educated at the University of North Carolina, where he was a member of the Philanthropic Society, he occupied himself as a planter and civic leader. Branch served in the North Carolina Senate from 1811 to 1817 and was the state's Governor from 1817 to 1820. After further service in the state Senate, he represented North Carolina in the United States Senate from 1823 until 1829 and was a strong supporter of Andrew Jackson.

When Jackson became President, he selected Branch as his Secretary of the Navy. In that post, Branch promoted several reforms in the Navy's policies and administration, many of which were not implemented until years later. He reduced the resources going to the construction of new ships, while increasing those applied to keeping existing vessels in good repair. Branch also sent the frigate USS Potomac to the Far East to punish the murderers of a U.S. merchant ship's crew and to generally promote and protect American commerce in the region.

John Branch resigned as Secretary in 1831, during the Petticoat affair, which involved the social ostracism of Margaret O'Neill Eaton, the wife of Secretary of War John H. Eaton by a group of Cabinet members and their wives led by Floride Calhoun, the wife of Vice President John C. Calhoun. Later that year, Branch was elected to the U.S. House of Representatives as a Jacksonian and later to North Carolina state political offices. In the mid-1830s, he moved to Leon County, Florida, where he lived for much of the next decade-and-a-half on his Live Oak Plantation. In 1844, President John Tyler appointed him Florida's territorial governor until the 1845 election of a governor under the state constitution. Branch returned to North Carolina in the early 1850s, remaining there until his death on January 4, 1863.

Branch is buried in Elmwood Cemetery in Enfield, North Carolina.

Branch married Eliza Fort (1787–1851) and had 7 children.

Branch was an uncle of the Confederate General Lawrence O'Bryan Branch. His daughter, Margaret, married Daniel Smith Donelson, the nephew of President Jackson.

== Bibliography ==
- American National Biography
- Dictionary of American Biography
- Haywood, Marshall Delancey. John Branch: 1782-1863. Raleigh, NC: Commercial Printing Co., 1915
- Hoffmann, William S. John Branch and the Origins of the Whig Party in North Carolina. North Carolina Historical Review 35 (July 1958): 299–315

== See also ==
- Branch County, Michigan - A county in Michigan that was named after him
- Branch, Branch County, Michigan - A village founded as the inaugural seat of that county, also named after him

== Sources ==
Party political offices
Preceded by Richard Dobbs Spaight Jr.	Democratic nominee for Governor of North Carolina; 1838	Succeeded by Romulus Mitchell Saunders
Political offices
Preceded by George Outlaw	Speaker of the North Carolina Senate; 1815–1817	Succeeded by Bartlett Yancey
Preceded by William Miller	Governor of North Carolina; 1817–1820	Succeeded by Jesse Franklin
Preceded by Samuel L. Southard	United States Secretary of the Navy; 1829–1831	Succeeded by Levi Woodbury
Preceded by Richard K. Call	Governor of Florida; 1844–1845	Succeeded by William Dunn Moseley
U.S. Senate
Preceded by Montfort Stokes	U.S. Senator (Class 2) from North Carolina; 1823–1829; Served alongside: Nathaniel Macon, James Iredell Jr.	Succeeded by Bedford Brown
U.S. House of Representatives
Preceded by Willis Alston	Member of the U.S. House of Representatives from North Carolina's 2nd congressional district 1831–1833	Succeeded by Jesse Bynum
