= William Person =

North Carolina military man (1734–1778)

- Born: November 30, 1734; Surry County, Virginia Colony
- Died: 1778; Bute County, North Carolina
- Spouse: Martha Eaton
- Military career
- Allegiance: United States of America
- Branch: North Carolina militia
- Service years: 1775-1776
- Rank: Colonel
- Unit: Bute County Regiment
- Commands: Bute County Regiment
- Conflicts: none

William Person (November 30, 1734 - 1778) was a planter, member of the colonial assembly of the Province of North Carolina (1771-1774), Revolutionary War Colonel, and commander of the Bute County Regiment of the North Carolina militia (1775-1776).

== Early life ==
William Person was born on November 30, 1734, in Surry County, Virginia. He was the son of William and Ann Person. He moved with his parents to Granville County (later became Bute County and now Warren County), North Carolina. He was granted six Granville Grants in the mid-1700s and became a large planter.

On December 16, 1771, he succeeded his brother, Benjamin, as representative of Bute County in the Province of North Carolina House of Burgesses and continued in this position until 1775. Then, he was elected member of the first four Provincial Congresses in North Carolina in 1774, 1775, and 1776. He was also a justice of the peace of Bute County.

He married Martha Eaton on September 2, 1759, in Granville County, Province of North Carolina. She was the daughter of William and Martha Rives Eaton. William and Martha had six children. William died in 1778 in Bute County, North Carolina.

== Revolutionary War service ==
On September 9, 1775, the Provincial Congress appointed William as a colonel and commander of the Bute County Regiment, subordinate to the Halifax District Brigade under Brigadier Allen Jones of the North Carolina militia. He resigned his commission in April 1776. He was replaced by Colonel Philemon Hawkis, Jr. The Bute County Regiment ceased to exist on January 30, 1779, since Franklin and Warren counties were created from Bute county and they both had regiments of militia.
