= William Miller (North Carolina politician) =

American politician

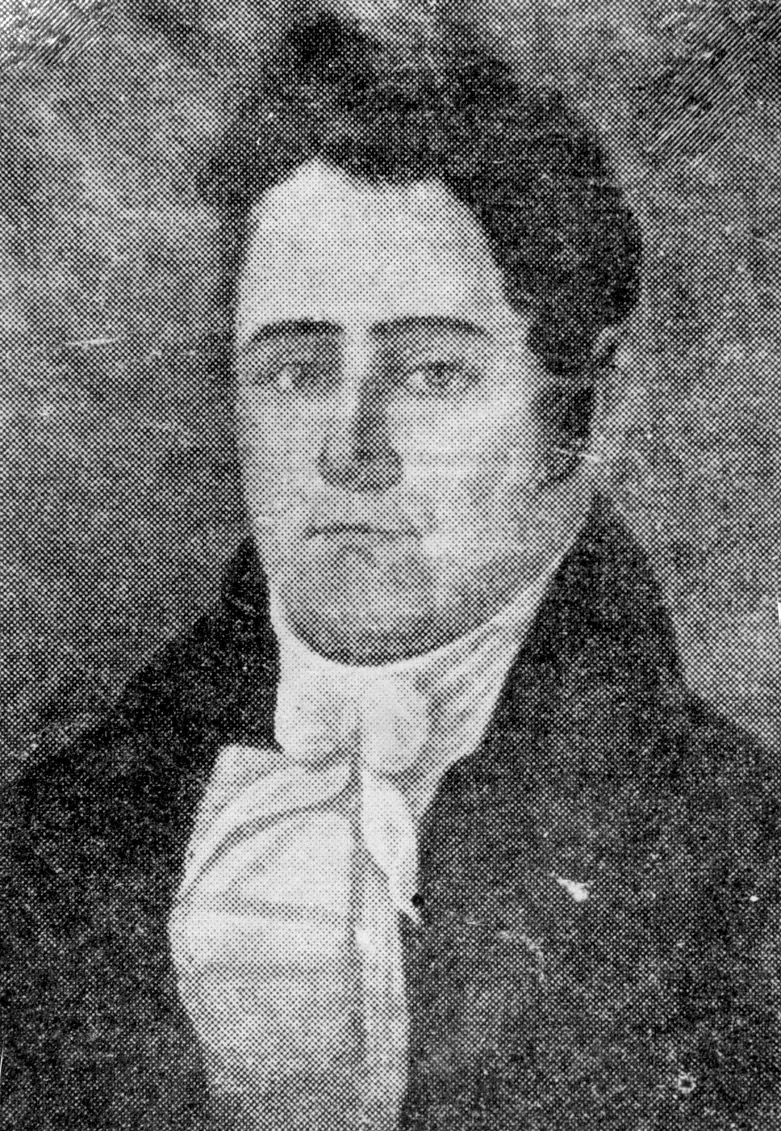

18th Governor of North Carolina
- In office November 29, 1814 – December 6, 1817
- Preceded by: William Hawkins
- Succeeded by: John Branch

Attorney General of North Carolina
- In office 1810
- Governor: David Stone
- Preceded by: Oliver Fitts
- Succeeded by: Hutchins Gordon Burton

Member of the North Carolina House of Commons
- In office 1810–1814

Personal details
- Born: c. 1783 Warren County, North Carolina, US
- Died: September 10, 1825 (aged 41–42) Key West, Florida, US
- Party: Democratic-Republican

William Miller (c. 1783 – September 10, 1825) was the 18th Governor of the U.S. state of North Carolina from 1814 to 1817.

== Biography ==
Born in Warren County, North Carolina, William Miller was orphaned at the age of 9 and inherited a substantial plantation. He briefly attended the University of North Carolina at Chapel Hill in 1802, but did not complete a degree. He began practicing law in 1805 and was named North Carolina Attorney General in 1810. That same year, he was elected to the North Carolina House of Commons, where he served until 1814, for two years as Speaker of the House (1812–1814).

In November 1814, Miller was elected Governor of North Carolina by the General Assembly, at the close of the War of 1812, which he supported. During his term, Miller laid the groundwork for the expansion of the state's educational system, and he served on the University of North Carolina Board of Trustees until his death. In 1816, he moved into the newly-built Governor's Palace in Raleigh.

After serving the maximum number of three one-year terms as governor, Miller left office in 1817. He returned to the North Carolina Senate in 1821, but lost a re-election bid the following year.

U.S. President John Quincy Adams appointed Miller as an envoy to Guatemala in 1825; Miller died after three days illness in Key West, Florida en route to his post.

== Sources ==
- Biographical Directory of the Governors of the United States, 1789–1978, Robert Sobel and John Raimo, eds. Westport, CT: Meckler Books, 1978. (ISBN 0-930466-00-4)

Legal offices
Preceded by Oliver Fitts	Attorney General of North Carolina; 1810	Succeeded by Hutchins Gordon Burton
Political offices
Preceded by William Hawkins	Governor of North Carolina; 1814–1817	Succeeded by John Branch
