= Bute County Regiment =

- Active: 1775-1779
- Allegiance: (United States) North Carolina
- Branch: North Carolina militia
- Type: Militia
- Role: infantry

Commanders
- Notable commanders: Colonel William Person; Colonel Philemon Hawkins, Jr.; Colonel Thomas Eaton

The Bute County Regiment was authorized on September 9, 1775 by the North Carolina Provincial Congress. It was subordinate to the Halifax District Brigade of militia commanded by Brigadier Allen Jones. The regiment was not engaged in any battles or skirmishes against the British during the American Revolution from 1775 until its disbandment on January 30, 1779. It was disbanded when Bute county was dissolved and split into Franklin and Warren counties. The regiment was split into the Franklin County Regiment and Warren County Regiment.

== Leadership ==
The Bute County Regiment was commanded by the following colonels:

- Colonel William Person (September 9, 1775 to April 1776)
- Colonel Philemon Hawkins, Jr. (1776 to 1779), also a Lieutenant Colonel; After the regiment was disestablished, he was assigned as a Lieutenant Colonel in the Warren County Regiment
- Colonel Thomas Eaton (1776-1779); After the regiment was disestablished, he was assigned the command of the Warren County Regiment (1779-1783) and acting commander (Brigadier General Pro Tempore) of the Halifax District Brigade in 1779 and 1781

In February 1776, the regiment was en route to Moore's Creek Bridge but arrived too late to see any action.

Known Majors included:

- 1st Maj. William Alston
- 2nd Maj. Thomas Sherrod
- Maj. William Brickell
- Maj. Green Hill
- Maj. Isaac Horn

Known Captains included:

- Charles Allen, Sr.
- William Allen
- Thomas Alston
- James Carver
- John Cokely
- John Colclough
- James Denton
- James Garrison
- Robert Goodloe
- William Green
- Britton Harris
- Jordan Harris
- Philemon Hawkins, Jr.
- Alsey High
- William Hill
- John Hopkins
- Henry Hunt
- Unknown Jeter
- Unknown Lynch
- Harrison Macon
- John McCann
- Benjamin Seawell
- Robert Temple
- Nathan Turner

== See also ==
- Bute County, North Carolina
- Warren County, North Carolina
- Franklin County, North Carolina
- Warren County Regiment
- Southern Campaigns: Pension Transactions for a description of the transcription effort by Will Graves
- Southern theater of the American Revolutionary War
- List of North Carolina militia units in the American Revolution
