= Battle of Wahab's Plantation =

1780 battle of the American Revolutionary War

- Part of the American Revolutionary War
Date	September 21, 1780
Location	present-day Union County, North Carolina 34.86084°N 80.76265°W
Result	Patriot victory

Belligerents
(United States) Patriot militia	Great Britain: (Kingdom of Great Britain) Loyalists

Commanders and leaders
(United States) William R. Davie	(Kingdom of Great Britain) George Hanger

Casualties and losses
1 wounded	15 killed 40 wounded

The Battle of Wahab's Plantation was a surprise attack on a Loyalist camp, which included elements of the British Legion commanded by Banastre Tarleton (although at the time of the battle Tarleton had yellow fever and was not in command), by Patriot militia under the command of William R. Davie on September 21, 1780. The owner of the plantation was militia Captain James A. Walkup who served as a guide for Davie prior to the attack. Confusion has arisen over the spelling of the name Wahab as there are many spellings of the surname including, Walkup/Wahab/Wauchope/Waughup. The Loyalists were camped on the west side of the Catawba River while General Charles Cornwallis' army had camped on the east side. Davie opportunistically decided to attack the Loyalist camp, and succeeded in driving them back in complete surprise and with heavy casualties. He retreated before the British regulars arrived.

== Background ==
Pursuant to the British "southern strategy" for winning the American Revolutionary War, British forces had captured Charleston, South Carolina early in 1780, and had driven Continental Army forces from South Carolina. Following his successful routing of a second Continental Army at Camden in August 1780, British General Lord Cornwallis paused with his army in the Waxhaws region of northern South Carolina. Believing British and Loyalist forces to be in control of Georgia and South Carolina, he decided to turn north and address the threat posed by the Continental Army remnants in North Carolina. In mid-September he began moving north toward Charlotte, North Carolina.

Cornwallis' movements were shadowed by companies of North Carolina militia. One force under Thomas Sumter stayed back and harassed British and Loyalist outposts in the South Carolina backcountry, while another, under Major William R. Davie, maintained fairly close contact with portions of his force as it moved northward. When he learned that companies of Loyalist dragoons and British light infantry were encamped to the rear of Cornwallis' army, he decided to attempt a surprise attack on one of those camps.

== Battle ==
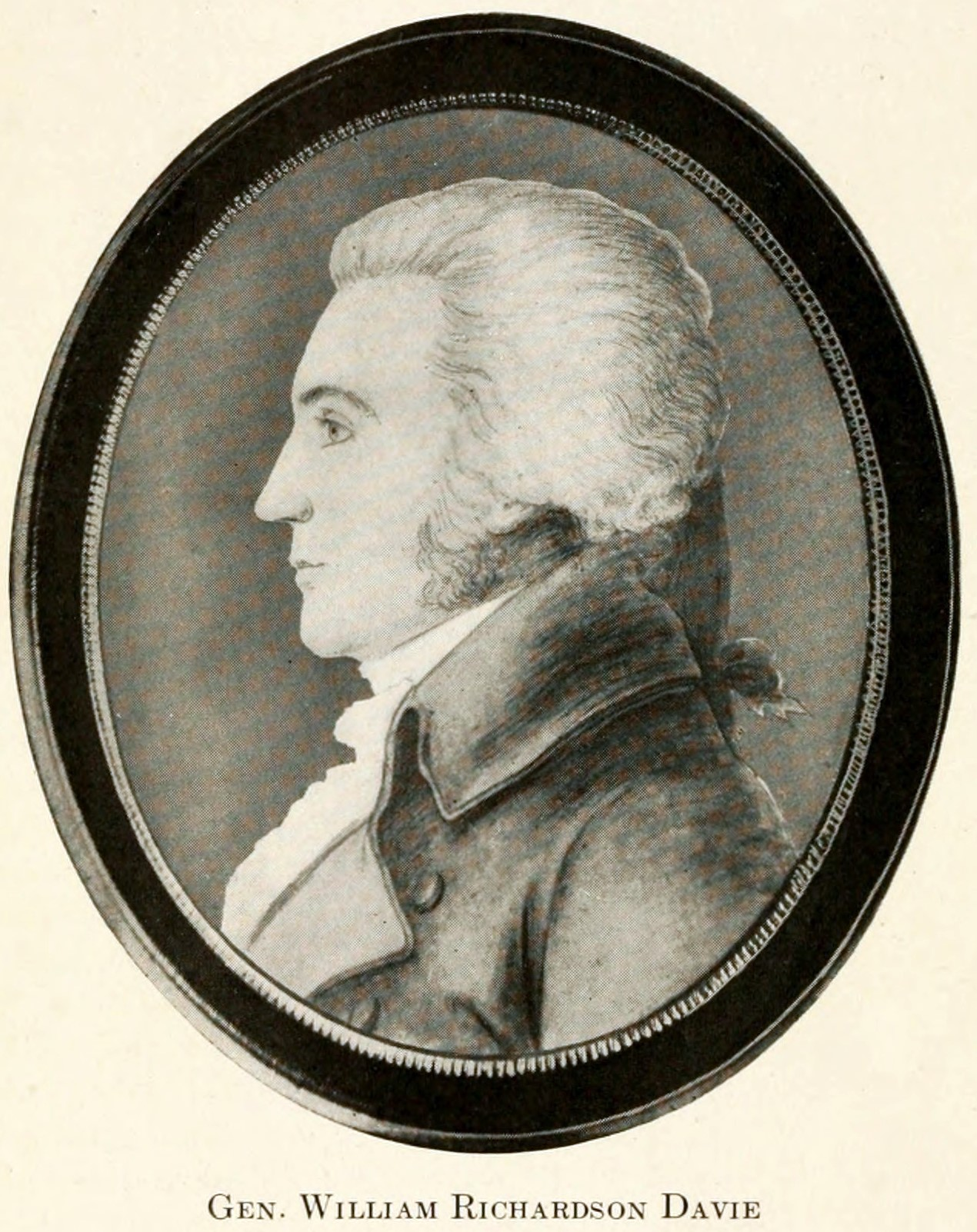
William Davie, portrait by Gilles Louis Chretien

Riding off on the evening of September 20, he located the Loyalist camp at Wahab's Plantation, not far from the light infantry camp. Sending William Davidson and a company of men through a cornfield to take the plantation house, he began moving up the lane toward the camp. The surprise was practically complete, and the Loyalists took flight, leaving 15 dead and 40 wounded.

== Aftermath ==
Davie did not linger at the Loyalist camp, as the infantry had taken notice and were beating to arms. He took away 96 horses and 120 muskets, and retreated to the north. Walkup's plantation was burnt. Davie again made contact with British forces a few days later when they entered Charlotte, North Carolina.

== Sources ==
- Memoirs of Henry Lee
- Pancake, John (1985). This Destructive War. University of Alabama Press. ISBN 0-8173-0191-7.
- Robertson, John. "Wahab's Plantation". Global Gazetteer of the American Revolution.
