= Janus (horse) =

18th-century British Thoroughbred racehorse

- Sire: Janus I ("Old Janus")
- Grandsire: Godolphin Arabian
- Dam: Fox Mare
- Damsire: Fox
- Sex: Stallion
- Foaled: 1746
- Country: Great Britain; American Colonies
- Breeder: Francis Godolphin, 2nd Earl of Godolphin
- Owner: Francis Godolphin, 2nd Earl of Godolphin; Anthony Langley Swymmer; George Grisewood; Mordecai Booth; Mildred Willis; Jeptha Atherton
- Last updated on 27 August 2023

Janus (1746–1780), also known as Little Janus, Young Janus, and Janus II, was an English Thoroughbred stallion imported to Colonial America, which would later become the United States. Noted for his quickness and compact conformation, he has subsequently been acknowledged as a foundation sire of the American Quarter Horse.

== Background ==
Bred by Francis Godolphin, 2nd Earl of Godolphin, Janus was foaled in England in 1746. He was a grandson of the Godolphin Arabian, and like his grandsire was chestnut in color. Subsequently, he was owned by Anthony Langley Swymmer, a founding member of the Jockey Club and an English MP. He raced under various names including Little Janus and Stiff Dick. His English racing career took place between 1750 and 1752. Janus won twice at 4 miles and was retired due to injury. Janus was sold to George Grisewood, a horse breeder and turf enthusiast.

== Life in America ==
After becoming lame, Janus was imported to Virginia Colony by Mordecai Booth in 1752, and resold to Mildred Willis.

Janus was able to fully recover and went on to race again. He won races in Virginia and North Carolina. Janus was compact, standing just over 14 hands (56 inches, 142 cm), yet large boned with powerful hindquarters.

In late 1771 or early 1772 he was sold to Jeptha Atherton and was moved to North Carolina. In 1773 he was at stud at what would later become Northampton Courthouse, in Jackson, North Carolina.

Janus died in 1780, aged 34. His offspring included Celer, foaled in 1774, and Spadille.

Manly Wade Wellman wrote a fictionalized account of the life of Janus.

== Sire line tree ==
- Janus
  - Peacock
  - Wilkins Spadille (out of Selima)
  - Babram
  - Buie
  - Meades Celer
  - Turpins Fleetwood
    - Printer
  - Twigg
