= Branch, Branch County, Michigan =

Coordinates: 41°55′46.0″N 85°03′16.7″W

Branch was the first seat of Branch County, Michigan, so designated in 1831. The settlement and county derive their name from John Branch, then Secretary of the US Navy.

== History ==
The village of Mason was initially selected to be the first seat of Branch County at inauguration, however due to a procedural error the decision was declared void and the as-then unbuilt village of Branch was selected as the first seat. A post office operated from 1835 to 1864. The seat was moved to Coldwater in 1842 and the village gradually died out.
