= William B. Henderson =

American politician

William B. Henderson was an African American farmer, and Republican state legislator in North Carolina. He lived in Middleburg, North Carolina.

In 1892, he was elected to the North Carolina House of Representatives, but John P. Leach and the Democrats unseated him and several other Republicans. He represented Vance County in the North Carolina Senate in 1897.

In 1898, North Carolina Governor D. L. Russell appointed him as fertilizer inspector.

== See also ==
- North Carolina General Assembly of 1899–1900
