= Jesse Atherton Bynum =

American politician

Jesse Atherton Bynum (May 23, 1797 – September 23, 1868) was a North Carolina landowner and politician.

He was the grandson of Colonel Jeptha Atherton, who served throughout the American Revolutionary War.

== Political career ==
Bynum was a Congressional Representative from North Carolina; born in Halifax County, North Carolina, May 23, 1797; attended Princeton College in 1817 and 1818; studied law; was admitted to the bar and commenced practice in Halifax, North Carolina; member of the house of commons of North Carolina in 1822, 1823, and 1826–1829; elected as a Jacksonian to the Twenty-second and Twenty-third Congresses and as a Democrat to the two succeeding Congresses (March 4, 1833 – March 3, 1841).

== Later life ==
Bynum moved to Alexandria, Louisiana, where he engaged in agricultural pursuits; died in Alexandria, La., September 23, 1868; interment in Rapides Cemetery, Pineville, Louisiana.

== See also ==
- Twenty-second United States Congress
- Twenty-third United States Congress
- Twenty-fourth United States Congress
- Twenty-fifth United States Congress

U.S. House of Representatives
Preceded by John Branch	Member of the U.S. House of Representatives from North Carolina's 2nd congressional district 1833–1841	Succeeded by John R.J. Daniel
