= Philemon Hawkins II =

American politician (1717–1801)

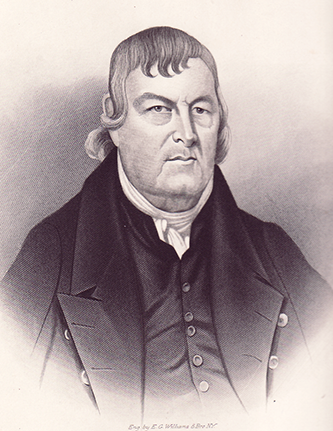
- Born: September 28, 1717; Charles City County, Virginia
- Died: September 10, 1801 (aged 83); Warren County, North Carolina
- Burial place: Pleasant Hill, North Carolina
- Military career
- Allegiance: United States
- Branch: North Carolina militia
- Service years: 1775-1783
- Rank: Lieutenant Colonel
- Units: Bute Regiment; Warren Regiment
- Conflicts: Battle of Alamance; American Revolutionary War

Philemon Hawkins II (September 28, 1717 – September 10, 1801) was an American planter and politician who served in the North Carolina militia during the Revolutionary War.

== Early life and career ==
Hawkins was born on September 28, 1717, in Charles City County, Virginia. His parents were Philemon Hawkins and Anne Eleanor Howard. He was initially known as Philemon Hawkins, Jr. His parents were from Devonshire in England, and settled in Virginia in 1717. His father reportedly descended from Sir John Hawkins, the English naval commander, and died in Gloucester County, Virginia in 1725.

After his father's death, Hawkins moved to Bute County, North Carolina in 1735, along with his mother and two siblings, John and Ann. In 1743 he married Delia Martin, daughter of Colonel Zachariah Martin of Mecklenburg County, Virginia. He filled many public positions in Bute County and became the wealthiest man in the county. In 1771 he served as an aide-de-camp to Governor William Tryon during the expedition against the Regulators. He served as a delegate to the North Carolina Provincial Congress in Halifax in 1776. He served seven terms representing Granville County in the North Carolina General Assembly between 1779 and 1787. In 1782–1783, he was elected to the North Carolina Council of State by the General Assembly.

He and Delia had six children: John Hawkins, Joseph Hawkins, Benjamin Hawkins, Philemon Hawkins III, Delia Hawkins, and Ann Hawkins. Lieutenant Colonel Joseph Hawkins and Major John Hawkins served in the Warren Regiment, along with their father.

== American Revolutionary War ==
He served in the North Carolina militia during the Revolutionary War:

- September 9, 1775: He was appointed by the North Carolina Provincial Congress to serve as lieutenant colonel of the Bute Regiment, in which he served until the regiment was abolished in 1779.
- May 3, 1776: The Provincial Congress selected him as a colonel of the Second Battalion of Militia. He did not stay with this unit and resigned this commission.
- January 30, 1779: He was appointed to serve as a lieutenant colonel of the Warren Regiment, which was created after Bute County and the Bute County Regiment were abolished.

== Death ==
Hawkins died on September 10, 1801, in Warren County, North Carolina, and was buried at the family homestead (Pleasant Hill), along with his wife, who died in 1794.
