= Pleasant Hill/Hawkins House =

Historic house in North Carolina, United States

- U.S. National Register of Historic Places
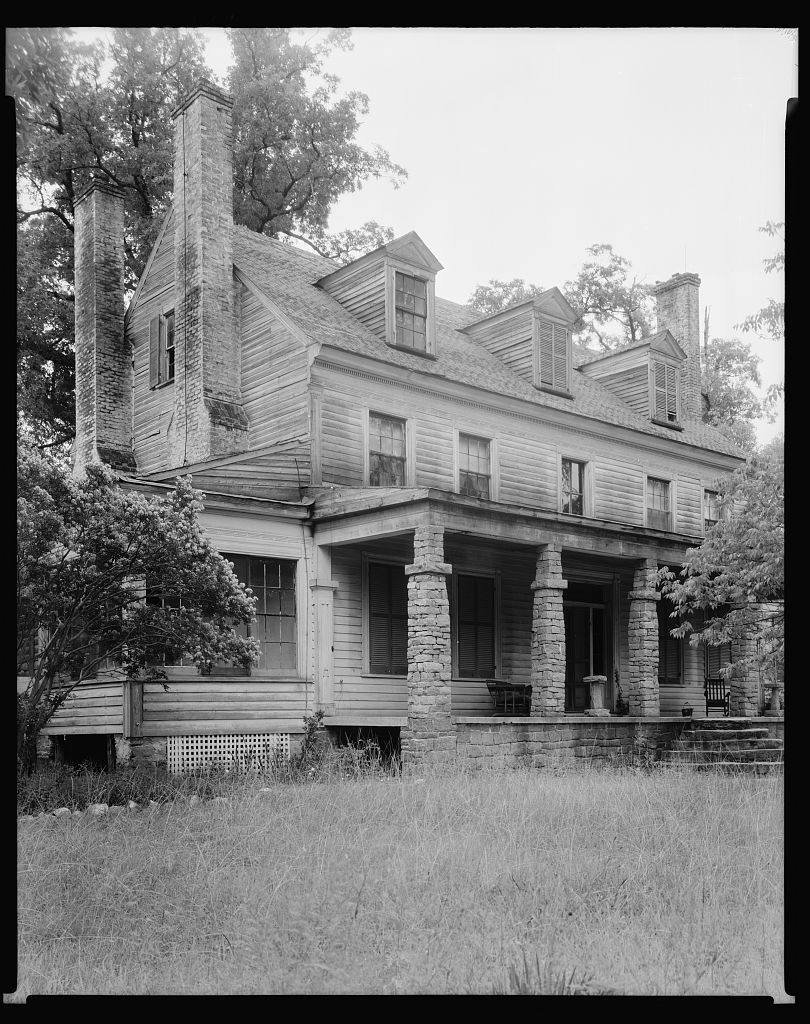
- Pleasant Hill

- Location within North Carolina Location within the United States
- Location: W of Middleburg on SR 1371, near Middleburg, North Carolina
- Coordinates: 36°24′2″N 78°20′34″W
- Area: 3.7 acres (1.5 ha)
- Built: 1759
- Architectural style: Greek Revival, Georgian
- NRHP reference No.: 79001758
- Added to NRHP: March 19, 1979

Pleasant Hill, also known as Rivenoak and Hawkins House, is a historic plantation house located near Middleburg, Vance County, North Carolina. It was built in 1759 and remodeled in the 1850s in the Greek Revival style. It is a 2 1/2-story, five-bay, Georgian double pile plan frame dwelling. It has a moderately steep gable roof with dormers and double-shoulder brick chimneys. The original dwelling was probably built by Philemon Hawkins, Jr., and birthplace of Governor William Hawkins (1777-1819).

It was listed on the National Register of Historic Places in 1979.
