= Warren County Regiment =

American colonial military unit

- Active: 1779-1783
- Allegiance: (United States) North Carolina
- Branch: North Carolina militia
- Type: Militia
- Role: infantry

Commanders
- Notable commanders: Colonel Thomas Eaton

The Warren County Regiment was established on January 3, 1779 by the North Carolina General Assembly when Bute County and its Regiment of militia were abolished. The regiment was engaged in battles and skirmished in North Carolina, South Carolina, and Georgia.

== Leadership ==
Colonels:

- Colonel Thomas Eaton, commander (1779-1783), former commander of the Bute County Regiment (1776-1779)
- Colonel Herbert Haynes, second colonel (1779-1783)

Lieutenant Colonels:

- Lt. Col. Alexander Dick
- Lt. Col. Philemon Hawkins, Jr.
- Lt. Col. William Christmas
- Lt. Col. Joseph Hawkins

== Known engagements ==
The regiment was known to be involved in 11 battles, skirmishes and sieges:

- March 3, 1779, Battle of Briar/Brier Creek, Georgia
- June 20, 1779, Battle of Stono Ferry, South Carolina
- August 11, 1780, Battle of Little Lynches Creek, South Carolina
- August 16, 1780, Battle of Camden, South Carolina
- September 26, 1780, Battle of Charlotte. North Carolina
- December 4, 1780, Battle of Rugeley's Mills #2, South Carolina
- January 17, 1781, Battle of Cowpens, South Carolina
- March 15, 1781, Battle of Guilford Court House, North Carolina
- April 25, 1781, Battle of Hobkirk's Hill, South Carolina
- May 12, 1781, Battle of Fort Motte, South Carolina
- May 24 to June 1, 1781, Siege of Augusta, Georgia

== See also ==
- Bute County, North Carolina
- Warren County, North Carolina
- Franklin County, North Carolina
- Bute County Regiment
- Southern Campaigns: Pension Transactions for a description of the transcription effort by Will Graves
- Southern theater of the American Revolutionary War
- List of North Carolina militia units in the American Revolution
