= Josiah Simpson =

Mississippi Territory judge (1787–1817)

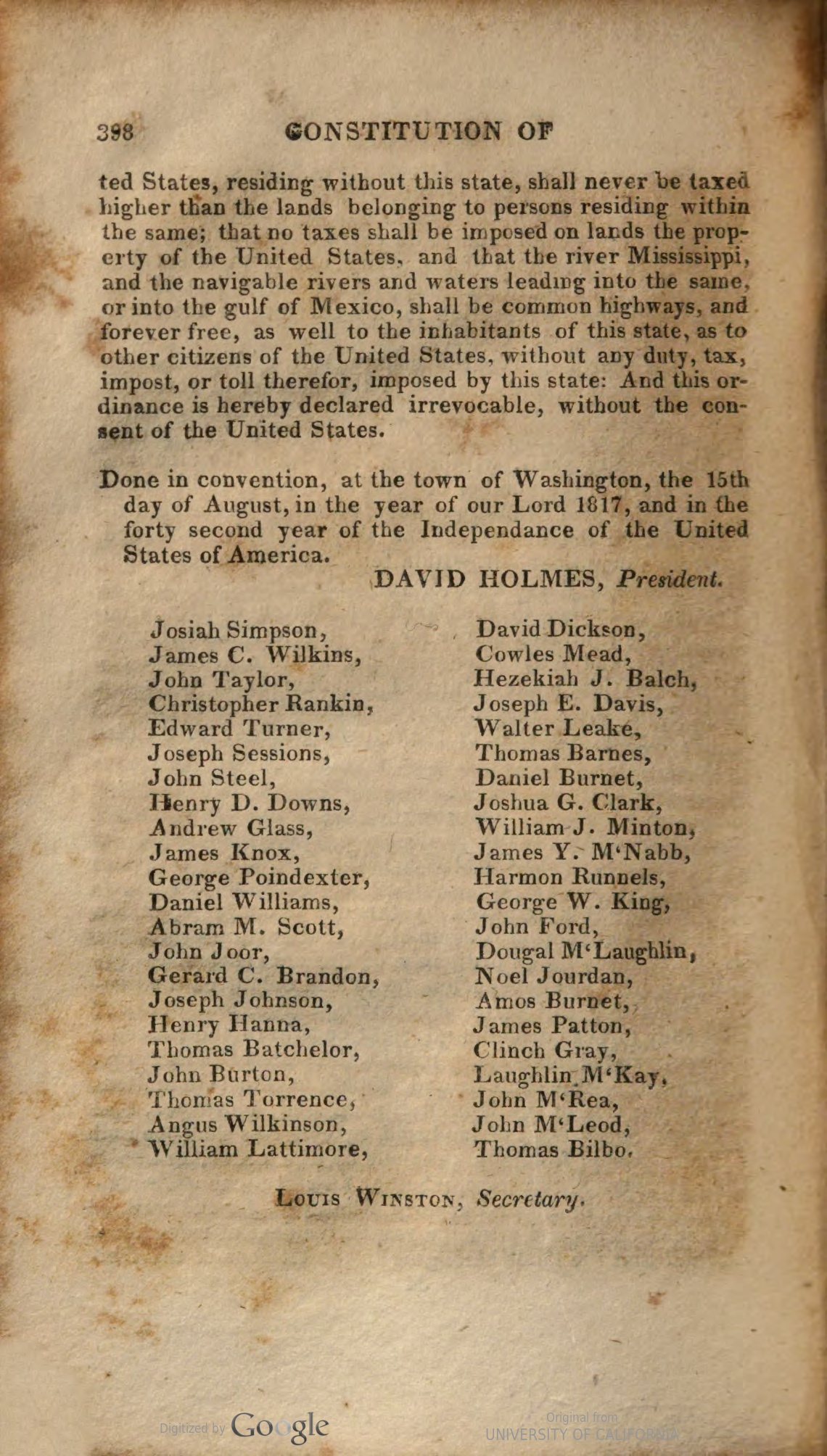
Signers of the 1817 Mississippi Constitution

Josiah Simpson (c. May 1787 – September 21, 1817) was a Mississippi Territory judge from 1812 to 1817. Originally from Pennsylvania, he graduated from Princeton College and worked as a private tutor in Virginia and as a lawyer in New Jersey before he was appointed to the bench in Washington, Mississippi Territory. He was heavily involved in the Mississippi constitutional convention of 1817, but died suddenly in autumn of that year and did not live to see statehood.

== Biography ==
Simpson was the son of William Simpson and was baptized May 12, 1787, in Newtown, Bucks County, Pennsylvania. Simpson had a sister named Mary Simpson, and a brother named John Simpson. He worked as a private tutor for the children of John Taliaferro in Fredericksburg, Virginia, circa 1805. Simpson graduated with an A.M. degree from Princeton College, class of 1807. He studied law and went into practice near Fredericksburg, Virginia, where he married first a Miss Stuart; after her early death, he married second Ann Stanard, daughter of Fredericksburg lawyer William Stanard. He was admitted to the bar in New Jersey in 1809, and seems to have practiced in the vicinity of New Brunswick.

Simpson was recommended for the seat by Congressman Henry Southard of New Jersey (in a letter to John Taliaferro and George Poindexter), and in a letter by Taliaferro to the Secretary of State. He was appointed a judge of Mississippi Territory to replace Oliver Fitts, and was present in the region by October 1812. Simpson lived at "Green Hill, near Natchez, afterwards known as Devereaux Hall." Alabama state archivist Peter Brannon reports that Simpson resigned 1813 and went back to New Jersey, at which time Oliver Fitts was angling to be reappointed to the seat. Simpson's commission, dated February 9, 1816, was handwritten on sheepskin, and signed by James Madison and James Monroe and was still in the possession of descendants as of 1942.

Simpson "took a very prominent part" in the 1817 Mississippi constitutional convention. Simpson was about 30 years old when he died in Mississippi a few months before statehood, of a "short and sudden illness." He was buried in Natchez "at the burying ground of this place" (possibly Natchez City Cemetery).

According to historian and Jacksonian Democratic partisan J. F. H. Claiborne, "He left an only daughter who became the wife of the Hon. Thos. L. Dobyns, a native of Mason county, Ky., who resided at Rodney, Miss., a leading lawyer and prominent politician, and died there in 1854." Claiborne classed Simpson with a number of other Pennsylvanians who held political sway in Natchez in the early decades of the 19th century, including the Duncans, Postlethwaites, Gustines, Butlers, Andrew Ellicott, David Holmes, Christopher Rankin, Robert J. Walker, James C. Wilkins, the Minors, and the Stockmans. The U.S. Congress appropriated $1,000 survivor benefit for Simpson's daughter.

Simpson County, Mississippi, organized in 1824, was named in his honor.

== See also ==
- List of Mississippi Territory judges
