= Oliver Fitts =

American lawyer and judge (1771–1816)

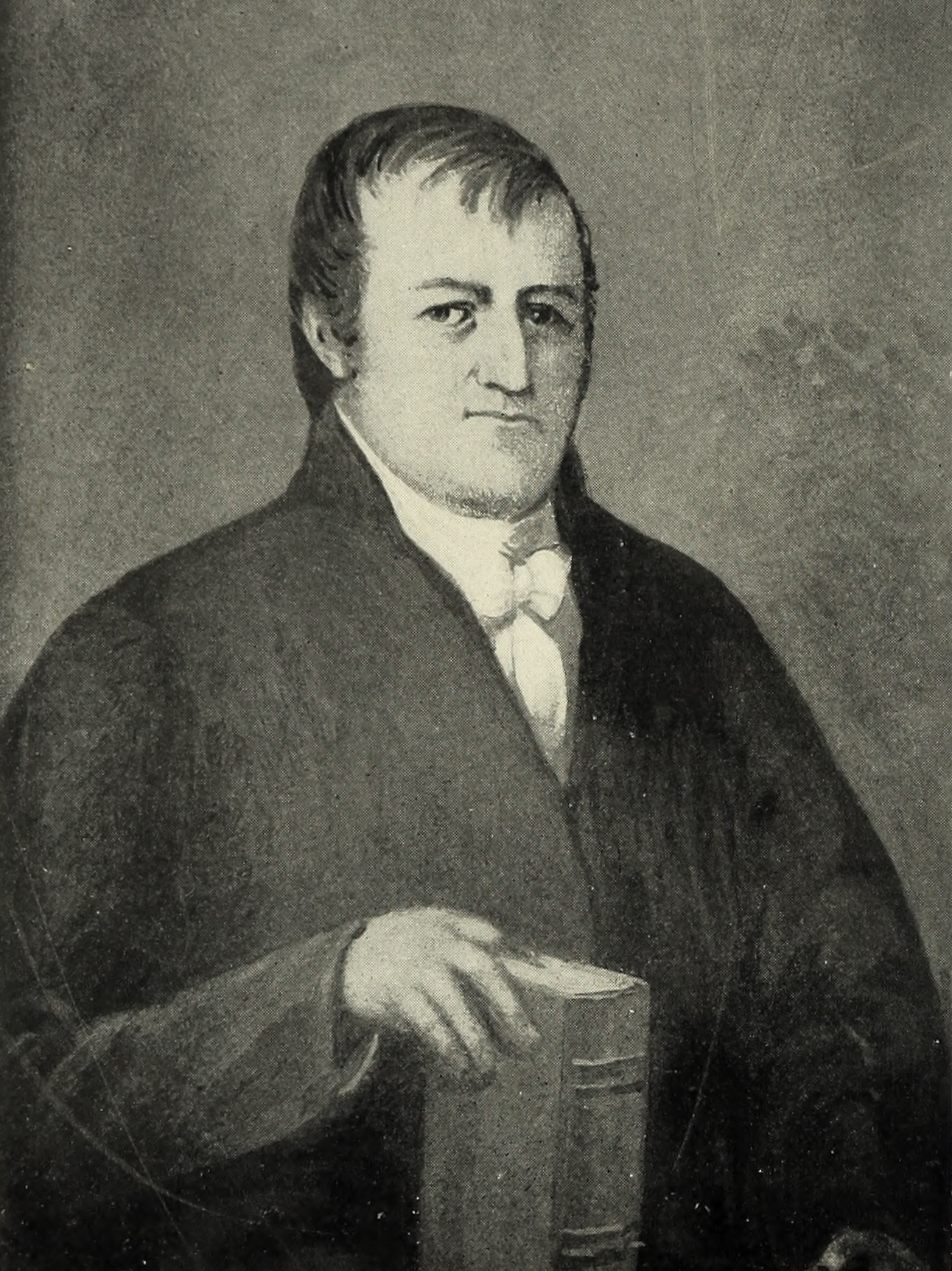
- Born: c. 1771; Dinwiddie County, Virginia
- Died: c. 1816; Vicinity of Washington County, Alabama (?)
- Known for: Attorney general of North Carolina, Mississippi Territory judge

Oliver Fitts (c. 1771–c. 1816) was an early American lawyer and judge. He was a resident of Warren County, North Carolina, and was North Carolina Attorney General from 1808 to 1810. President James Madison appointed him a judge of Mississippi Territory in 1810. He seems to have served for but a few months before resigning (apparently due to the death of his wife back in North Carolina). He was being promoted for reappointment to the bench in 1815. Researchers believe Fitts died in 1816 in Alabama; he may be buried in his son-in-law's plot in Old St. Stephens Cemetery.

== Life and career ==
Fitts was born in Dinwiddie County, Virginia. He represented Warren County in the North Carolina House of Representatives in 1798 and 1799. He was attorney general of North Carolina from 1808 to 1810. He was appointed to be a judge of Mississippi Territory in 1810, on recommendations by U.S. Senators from North Carolina James Turner and Jesse Franklin. The appointment was made by James Madison and confirmed by the Senate, on April 17 and 18, 1810.

He arrived in the territorial capital of Washington, M.T., in September 1810. According to one source, he was present solely for the "October Term, 1810, of the Superior Court of Adams County," and then went home. According to Mississippi historian Dunbar Rowland, he held court at St. Stephens in what is now Alabama until his death in 1816.

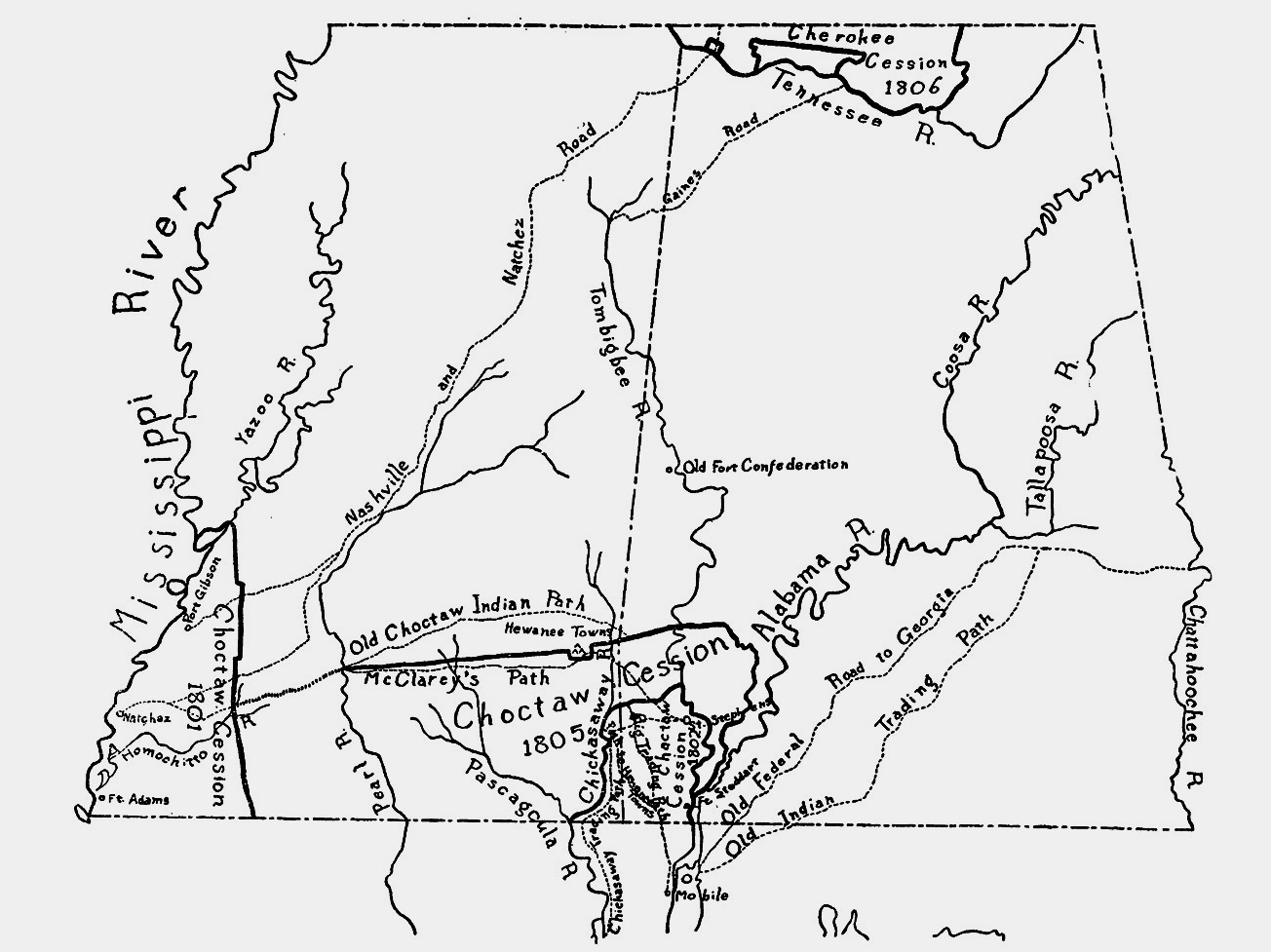
Mississippi and Alabama, 1803–1812, showing St. Stephens in the southwest corner of what is now Alabama

His wife died in Warrenton, North Carolina, in January 1811. According to Alabama state archivist Peter Brannon, "The situation of his family there was such that he saw he would be detained for a considerable time so resigned the judgeship in the Territory, considering it the right thing to do." Josiah Simpson was appointed "in succession to Judge Oliver Fitts" on February 1, 1812. The Alabama state archives holds letters written by Fitts in North Carolina in 1812 about the appointment of the new registrar of the General Land Office for "land claims east of Pearl river & west of the Perdido" (based at Fort Stoddert). Simpson resigned in 1813 and went back to New Jersey, per archivist Brannon, and "Mr. Fitts again wanted his old position as the additional judge to Hon. Harry Toulmin. Territorial records on the 24th of August, 1815, the President had not yet seen fit to fill the appointment but Senator Turner was still reminding him that Mr. Fitts would in accept. The question in my mind is whether Judge Fitts was ever reappointed. The Mississippi Territorial records available to me do not show that he was."

In 1814 Fitts listed for sale his 910-acre property in Warren County, North Carolina, near Opossum Quarter and Reedy Creek. Fitts is generally held to have died in 1816 and been buried in the "Crawford lot" at Old St. Stephens Cemetery in St. Stephens, Mississippi Territory, now Washington County, Alabama.

== Personal life and legacy ==
His children remained in Alabama and Mississippi and established plantations and businesses. One of his daughters married federal judge William Crawford.

There is an oil portrait of him in the Alabama state archives. It was supposedly painted "after 1820" at Washington, by one of the Peales, for $500.

== Sources ==
- Hamilton, William Baskerville (1953). Thomas Rodney: Revolutionary & Builder of the West. Durham, N.C.: Duke University Press – via Internet Archive.
- Rowland, Dunbar (1935). Courts, Judges, and Lawyers of Mississippi, 1798–1935. Mississippi Historical Society, and Mississippi Department of Archives and History. Jackson, Mississippi: Press of Hederman Bros. – via HathiTrust, digitized by Google Books from a copy held by the University of Michigan Libraries.
