= George Hanger, 4th Baron Coleraine =

British army officer and writer (1751–1824)

The Right Honourable The Lord Coleraine
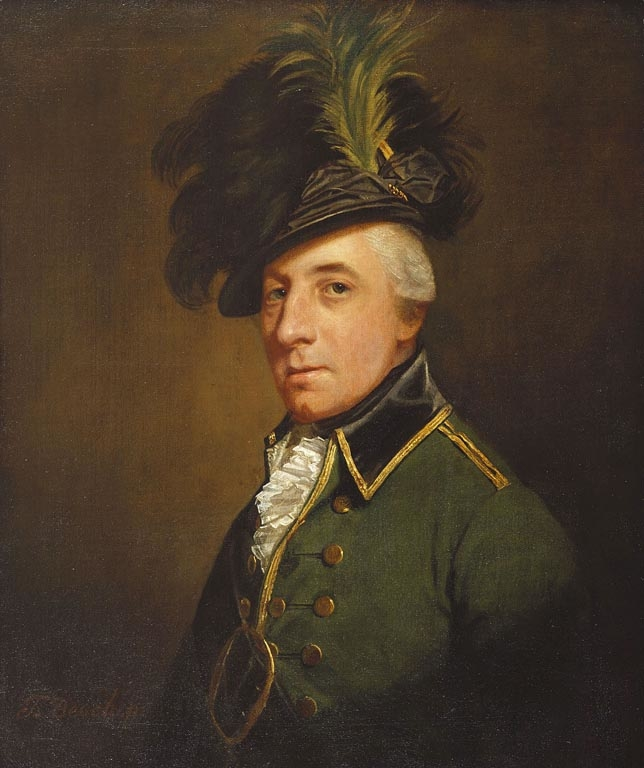
- Portrait by Thomas Beach, c. 1782–1792
- Born: 13 October 1751; Gloucestershire, England
- Died: 31 March 1824 (aged 72); London, England
- Education: University of Göttingen
- Father: Gabriel Hanger

George Hanger, 4th Baron Coleraine (13 October 1751 – 31 March 1824) was a British army officer and writer.

== Biography ==
George Hanger was born into a prosperous family in Gloucestershire, the third son in a family of seven children. His father was Gabriel Hanger, a member of parliament who in 1762 was created Baron Coleraine in the Peerage of Ireland.

As a younger son, Hanger's education was geared towards his entering a career of military service. He was sent to Reading School and then Eton before going to the University of Göttingen. After joining the Prussian Army of Frederick the Great, he returned to England and in 1771 purchased an Ensigncy in the 1st Regiment of Footguards.

In the army Hanger gained the reputation of being a womanizer to the detriment of his military duties. In 1776 he purchased a lieutenancy, but he resigned his commission in disgust after a more junior officer purchased promotion over him. He then purchased a captaincy in a German Jäger rifle company bound for North America to campaign in the American Revolutionary War. He served as aide-de-camp to Sir Henry Clinton during the siege of Charleston, South Carolina in 1776. Later during the war Hanger returned to British service under the command of Banastre Tarleton in the British Legion as a major and as commander of its light dragoons. In the Battle of Charlotte of 1780, Hanger commanded the legion due to Tarleton's illness, ordering it to ride into Charlotte, North Carolina without taking precautions to guard against surprise attacks. As a consequence, the legion's cavalry was badly mauled by Patriot militia that had set up an ambush in the town centre. Hanger was wounded in the battle, which he termed a "trifling insignificant skirmish". He shortly thereafter fell ill, probably with yellow fever, and was shipped to the Bahamas to recuperate.

He also became involved in a minor literary feud, in 1789, publishing An Address to the Army; In Reply To 'Strictures', by Roderick M'Kenzie (Late Lieutenant in the 71st Regiment) On Tarleton's History of the Campaigns of 1780 and 1781. The full title of M'Kenzie's book was Strictures on Colonel Banaster Tarleton's History of the Southern Campaigns of 1780 and 1781 and was itself critical of Tarleton's 1787 account of the southern campaigns called A History of the Campaigns of 1780 and 1781 in the Southern Provinces of North America.

After returning to England, he became a companion of the Prince of Wales (later King George IV). They became great friends, the prince apparently admiring Hanger's sense of humor and his exploits, both military and with women, and appointing him Equerry in 1791. The only surviving painting of Hanger comes from this period. Commissioned by the Prince, it remains in the Royal Collection. Hanger was also the butt of caricaturists and many prints of him survive. The British Museum Department of Prints and Drawings has numerous prints featuring him by James Gillray, Isaac Cruikshank, George Cruikshank and others. The National Portrait Gallery in London has a collection of twenty prints by James Gillray satirising him.

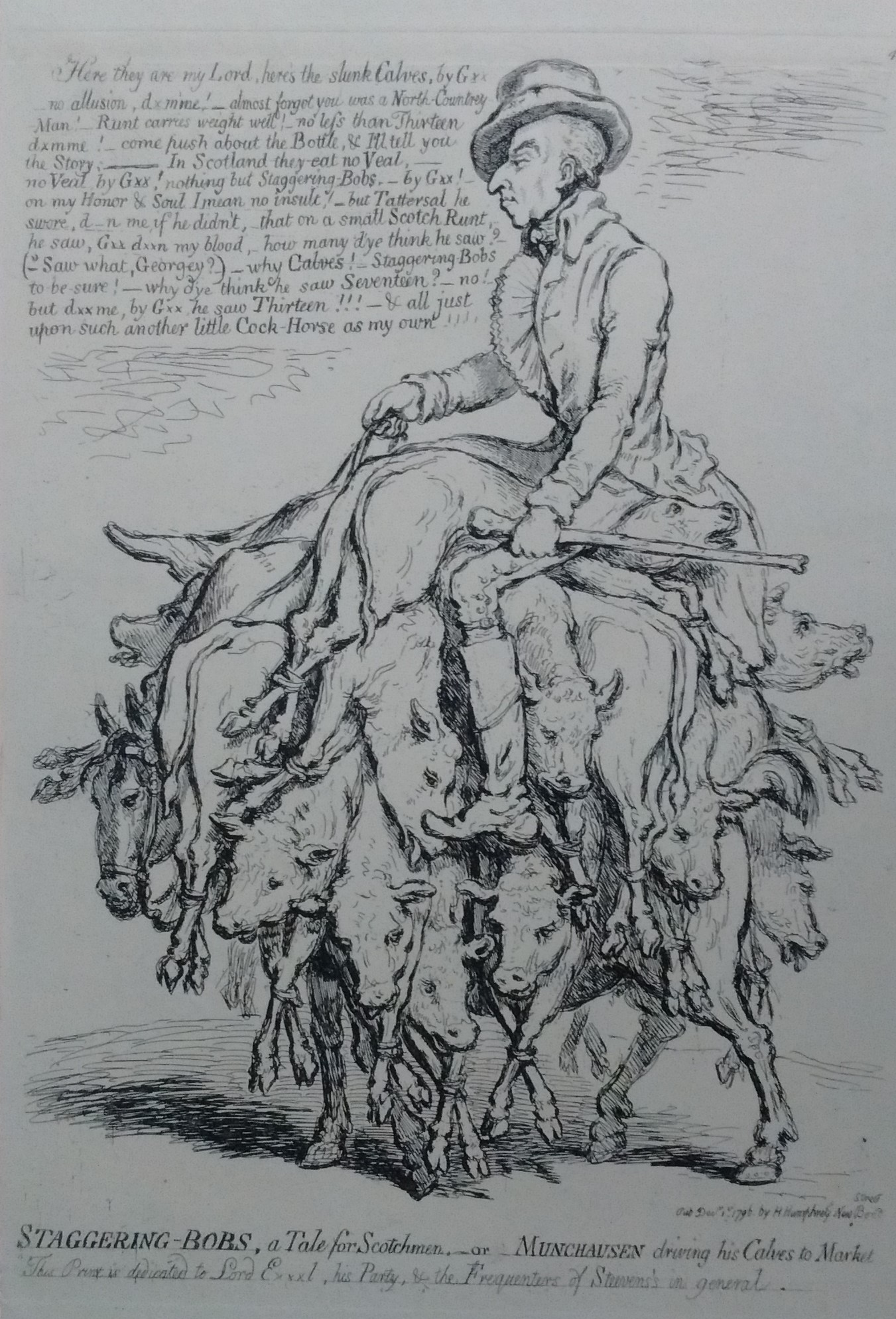
Caricature of Col.George Hanger by James Gillray, published 1796

Through his friendship with the Prince of Wales, Hanger associated with the parliamentary opposition politicians of the day. A number of prints show him in the circle of Charles James Fox, a prominent Whig opponent of the Tory prime minister William Pitt the Younger in the last years of the 18th century. Hanger is also depicted as a supporter of the reformist Member of Parliament Francis Burdett in the early 1800s.

In 1795 Hanger purchased the Lieutenant-Colonelcy of the 125th Foot, and six months later he exchanged his commission into one of the same rank in the 1st Battalion the 82nd Foot. In need of money, in 1796 he sold his lieutenant-colonelcy and purchased an ensigncy in the 70th Foot. He was imprisoned for debt in the King's Bench Prison from June 1798 to April 1799. In 1800 he set up in business as a coal merchant. In 1806 he was appointed captain-commissary in the Royal Artillery, but retired in March 1808 on full pay.

In addition to the Address to the army, Hanger was the author of several books on military and other matters. He wrote two polemical works arguing in favor of reinforcing the country's defences against the threat of invasion by the French during the French Revolutionary Wars and the Napoleonic Wars.

In 1801 he published a two-volume autobiography (co-authored by William Combe), The life, adventures and opinions of Col. George Hanger, a freewheeling work describing his early life and his military career in America, interspersed with observations on the King's Bench Prison and female prostitution. It contains the prediction that one day the northern and southern states "will fight as vigorously against each other as they both have united to do against the British". His last work, Colonel George Hanger to all sportsmen (1814), concerned field sports, on which he was an acknowledged authority.

On the death of his brother William, the 3rd Baron, in December 1814, the barony of Coleraine descended to Hanger, but he declined to assume the title. He died in London in 1824, whereupon the peerage became extinct.

Little is known about Hanger's personal life. His autobiography tells the colorful story of a youthful marriage to a gypsy, who left him for a tinker. He was survived by a second wife, Mary Anne (possibly his housekeeper) and a son, John Greenwood Hanger (baptized 1817, died 1847).

== Works ==
- An address to the army, in reply to strictures by R. M'Kenzie...on Tarleton's History of the campaigns of 1780 and 1781 (London, 1789)
- Anticipation of the freedom of Brabant, with the expulsion of the Austrian troops from that country (London, 1792)
- Military reflections on the attack and defence of the city of London (London, 1795)
- The life, adventures, and opinions of Col. George Hanger 2 vols. (London, 1801)
- Reflections on the menaced invasion, and the means of protecting the capital (London, 1804)
- The lives and adventures and sharping tricks of notorious eminent gamesters of the sixteenth and seventeenth centuries (London, 1804)
- A Plan for the Formation of a Corps, Which Never Has Been Raised As Yet in Any Army in Europe: In Which Corps Singly Shall Be Comprised All the Strength, Activity, Energy, and Skill of Four Corps; Namely, a Regular Battalion, a Corps of Light Infantry, a Corps of Sharp Shooters, and a Corps of Rifle Marksmen (London, 1808)
- A letter to...Lord Castlereagh...proving how one hundred and fifty thousand men may be acquired in...two months (London, 1808)
- Colonel George Hanger to all sportsmen, and particularly to farmers and gamekeepers (London, 1814)

Peerage of Ireland
Preceded by William Hanger	Baron Coleraine; 1814-1824	Extinct
