= Royal North Carolina Regiment =

American Revolutionary War regiment

- Active: 1779-1783
- Country: Great Britain
- Allegiance: British Army
- Type: British provincial unit
- Size: Unknown
- Garrison/HQ: Colony of North Carolina
- Engagements: American Revolutionary War

Commanders
- Notable commanders: Colonel John Hamilton; Lieutenant Colonel Campbell

The Royal North Carolina Regiment was a provincial corps of Loyalists from the Province of North Carolina that fought for Great Britain during the American Revolution. Provincial corps were regiments with both British and Loyalist forces. They were founded in 1779 and were disbanded in 1783.

== History ==
The Royal North Carolina Regiment was raised by Lieutenant-Colonel Campbell out of various Loyalist North Carolinan refugees that had fled into Georgia in 1779, organised into one unit of infantry and one of cavalry. The regiment took part in the siege of Charleston under the command of Colonel John Hamilton. Despite winning the siege, Hamilton was captured by the rebels whilst out on a scouting mission. The regiment then joined Lord Cornwallis in his army's invasion of North Carolina. Due to their associations with the colony, the Royal North Carolina Regiment gained more volunteers so that it grew to a total of eight companies. Cornwallis left most of the Royal North Carolina Regiment to garrison Wilmington, North Carolina. However, the Light Infantry Company and one other remained with him and surrendered at the Siege of Yorktown. At the end of the war in 1783, They sailed to Nova Scotia where they were amongst the last of the British Provincial units to be disbanded.

== Officers ==
They were initially led by Colonel John Hamilton after being founded by Campbell, One of the most prominent Loyalists to be a part of the regiment was Captain John Legett, a rich planter in Bladen County. He organized and led one of the few loyalist brigades in the South, the North Carolina Volunteers. After the war, Captain Legett and some of his men moved to Nova Scotia; the British gave them free land grants in County Harbour as compensation for their losses in the colony. The great majority of Loyalists serving in the regiment remained in North Carolina and became citizens of the new nation,

== Known engagements ==
- June 20, 1779 – Battle of Stono Ferry, South Carolina
- March 29 – May 12, 1780 – Siege of Charleston, South Carolina
- August 6, 1780 – Battle of Hanging Rock, South Carolina
- August 16, 1780 – Battle of Camden, South Carolina
- May 7, 1781 – Halifax, North Carolina
- August 2, 1781 – Rockfish, North Carolina
- March 15, 1781 - Battle of Guilford Courthouse, North Carolina
- August 19, 1781 – New Bern, North Carolina
- October 19, 1781 - Siege of Yorktown Virginia

== Bibliography ==
- Pancake, John S. (1985). This Destructive War: The British Campaign in the Carolinas, 1780–1782.
- Rankin, Hugh F. (1959). North Carolina in the American Revolution.
- Troxler, Carole Watterson (July 1990). 'The Great Man of the Settlement': North Carolina's John Legett at Country Harbour, Nova Scotia, 1783–1812., NCHR 67
- "A History of The Royal North Carolina Regiment, Lt. Colonel John Hamilton's Corp, 1777–1784, The Recreated Royal North Carolina Regiment".
- DeMond, Robert O. (1979). The Loyalists in North Carolina During the Revolution. Baltimore, Md.: Genealogical Publishing Co. ISBN 9780806308395.
- Braisted, Todd (2000). Index to Royal North Carolina Regiment History. The On-Line Institute for Advanced Loyalist Studies.
