= William Hawkins (North Carolina politician) =

Governor of North Carolina (1777–1819)

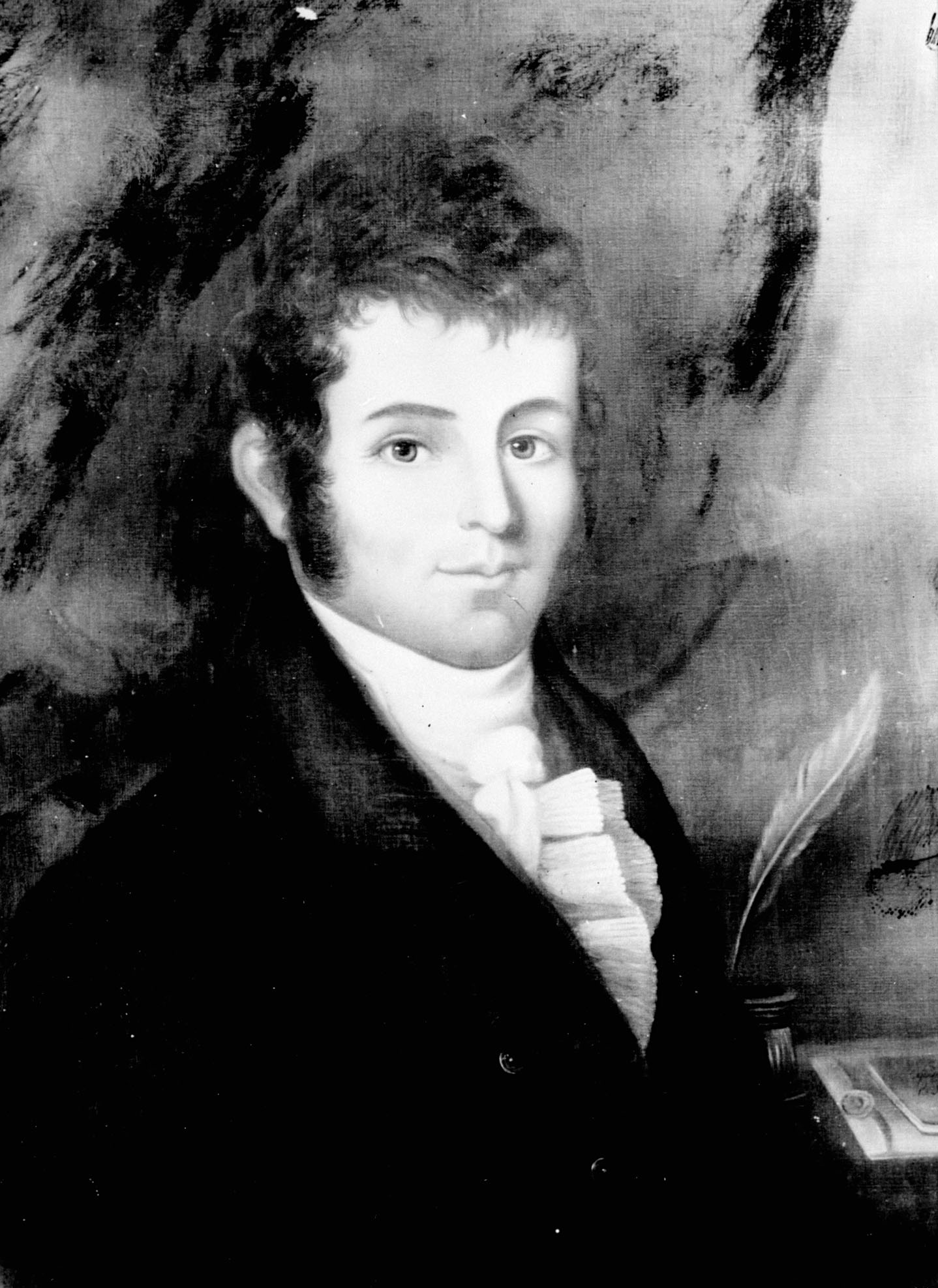

17th Governor of North Carolina
- In office December 11, 1811 – November 29, 1814
- Preceded by: Benjamin Smith
- Succeeded by: William Miller

Member of the North Carolina House of Commons
- In office 1804–1811

Personal details
- Born: October 10, 1777 Pleasant Hill (present-day Vance County, North Carolina)
- Died: May 17, 1819 (aged 41)
- Party: Democratic-Republican
- Spouse: Anne Swepson Boyd (m.1803)
- Children: 6
- Profession: Lawyer

William Hawkins (October 10, 1777 – May 17, 1819) was the 17th governor of North Carolina from 1811 to 1814.

== Early life and education ==
William Hawkins was born at his family plantation, called Pleasant Hill, in what is today Vance County, North Carolina; he was one of twelve children born by his mother Lucy Davis Hawkins. His father, Philemon Hawkins III, was a planter and member of the North Carolina General Assembly. As a young man, Hawkins studied law in North Carolina under Judge John Williams and at Princeton University.

== Career ==
Hawkins worked for two years in Georgia with the Creek people as an Indian agent under his uncle, Benjamin Hawkins, U.S. Supervisor of Southeast Indian tribes. After that, he returned to North Carolina to practice law. In 1801, he was assigned by Gov. James Turner to settle a dispute and arrange a settlement with those Tuscarora Indians remaining in Bertie County, North Carolina. (The great majority of the tribe had migrated to New York state by 1722, where they settled with the Oneida people of the Iroquois Confederacy.)

In 1804, Hawkins was elected to the North Carolina House of Commons from Warren County and served a single term. In 1809, he was elected as a representative from Granville County; he served until 1811. From 1810 to 1811, he was Speaker of the House.

In December 1811, Hawkins was elected as Governor of North Carolina by the General Assembly. He served the constitutional limit of three terms, which coincided with the duration of the War of 1812 through 1814. During the war, he supported the military efforts of the federal government and assisted in raising a volunteer militia of 7,000 troops.

Hawkins retired from politics after the end of his term as governor, except for one term in the House of Commons in 1817. He died in 1819 and is buried in Sparta, Georgia.

== Personal life ==
Hawkins in 1803 married Anne Swepson Boyd of Mecklenburg County, Virginia. They had six children together.

== Notes ==
Political offices
Preceded by Benjamin Smith	Governor of North Carolina; 1811–1814	Succeeded by William Miller
