= William Richardson Davie =

American military officer and Founding Father (1756-1820)

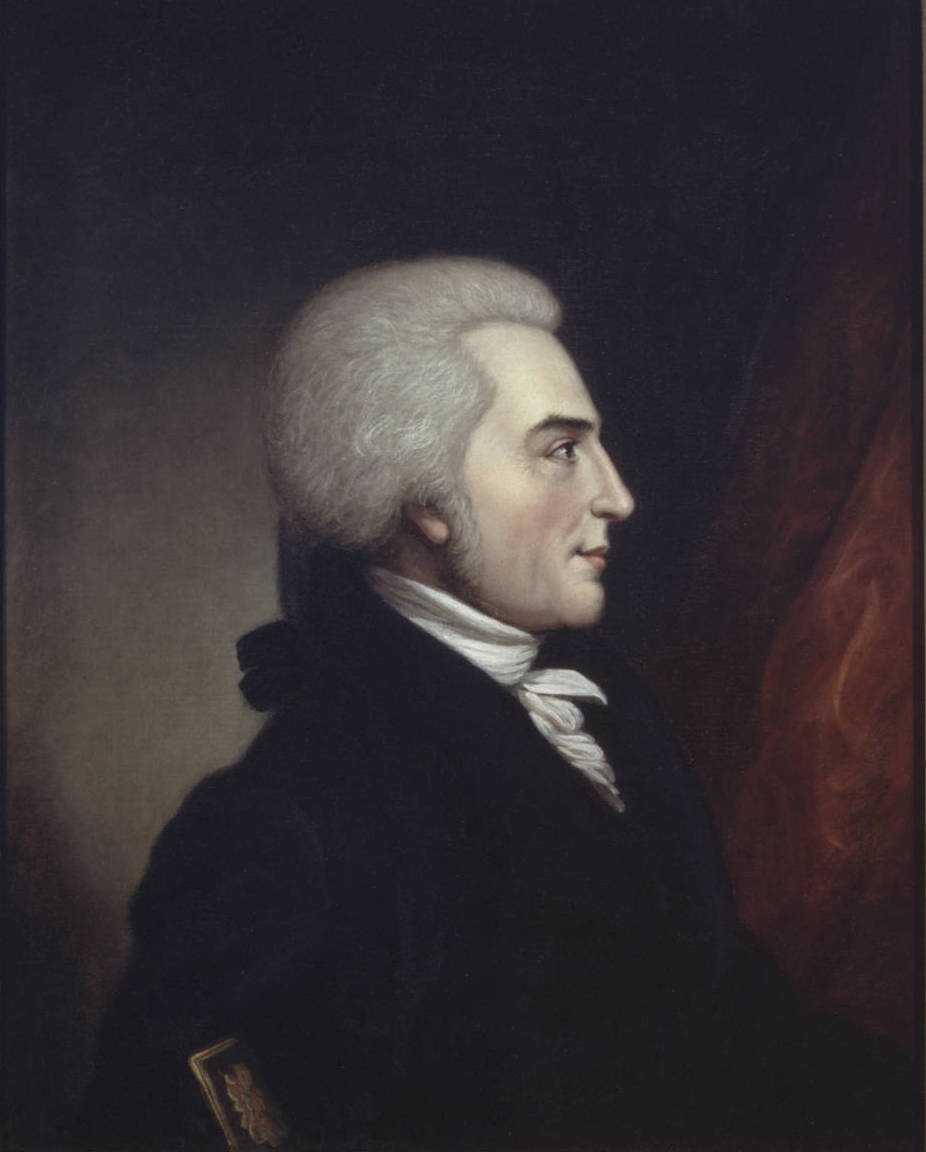
- Portrait by Charles Willson Peale

10th Governor of North Carolina
- In office December 7, 1798 – November 23, 1799
- Preceded by: Samuel Ashe
- Succeeded by: Benjamin Williams

Personal details
- Born: June 20, 1756 Egremont, Cumberland, England, Great Britain
- Died: November 29, 1820 (aged 64) Chester County, South Carolina, U.S.
- Party: Federalist
- Spouse: Sarah Jones (m. 1782)
- Education: College of New Jersey
- Military career
- Allegiance: United States
- Branch: North Carolina Militia
- Service years: 1778,1779–1782
- Rank: Colonel; Commissary General for North Carolina
- Units: Rowan County Regiment (1779); North Carolina Light Dragoons Regiment (1779); 2nd Mecklenburg County Regiment (1779–1780); Independent Corps of Light Horse (1780); North Carolina State Cavalry-Western District (1780)
- Conflicts: American Revolutionary War; Battle of Stono Ferry; Battle of Wahab's Plantation; Battle of Charlotte

William Richardson Davie (June 20, 1756 – November 29, 1820) was an American statesman, politician, military general, and Founding Father of the United States who served as the 10th governor of North Carolina from 1798 to 1799. A member of the Federalist Party, Davie also served as a delegate to the Constitutional Convention as a representative of North Carolina. He is also one of the key founders of the University of North Carolina.

== Early life ==
Davie was born in Egremont, County Cumberland in North West England, where his father Archibald Davie, who is listed in the 1790 census as living in Chester, South Carolina, had settled with his mother, Mary Richardson, whose family came from Dumfriesshire, Scotland. He settled in the American colonies in 1764 when his father brought him to the Waxhaws region near Lancaster, South Carolina. He was named for his maternal uncle, William Richardson, a prominent Presbyterian minister in South Carolina, and when Richardson died, Davie inherited 1 acre of his land, five slaves, and an extensive library. After that, he always used his full name to honor his uncle. Davie was educated by the young Presbyterian teacher Joseph Alexander at Queen's Museum, later Liberty Hall, in Charlotte. He then matriculated at Alexander's alma mater, the College of New Jersey (now Princeton University), graduating in 1776. One of his teachers at Princeton was fellow Carolinian William Churchill Houston. Davie and classmate Jonathan Dayton would serve with Houston as a delegate to the Constitutional Convention, while two other fellow students would also be among the framers: James Madison and Gunning Bedford, Jr.

== Revolutionary War ==
After leaving New Jersey, Davie began to study law in Salisbury, North Carolina, under Spruce Macay (pronounced "Muh-coy"), who would later provide Andrew Jackson with legal training. In December 1778, Davie left Salisbury to join 1,200 militiamen led by Brigadier General Allen Jones of Northampton County, NC. Jones's force advanced toward Charleston, South Carolina, intending to aid the port city as it prepared its defenses against possible British assault. That threat receded, so Davie and the rest of Jones's men returned to North Carolina after marching as far south as Camden, South Carolina.

After briefly resuming his studies in Salisbury, Davie closed his law books again in the spring of 1779 to re-enter military service. This time, though, Davie did not volunteer for an existing force; he helped to raise and train a local cavalry troop. For his work in forming "a Company of Horses in the District of Salisbury," he received a lieutenant's commission in April from North Carolina Governor Richard Caswell.

Davie did not remain in that junior rank for long. In May 1779, he and his company were attached to the legion of General Casimir Pułaski, who moved from Pennsylvania to South Carolina earlier in the year to help bolster American positions in and around Charleston. Promoted to the rank of major under Pulaski, Davie assumed command of a brigade of cavalry. On June 20, 1779, just two days shy of his twenty-third birthday, Davie led a charge against British forces at the Battle of Stono Ferry outside Charleston. He suffered a serious wound to his thigh in that engagement, fell from his horse, and narrowly escaped capture.

While convalescing from his injuries, Davie resumed his legal studies in Salisbury. The citizenry presented him with an honorary sword for his exemplary conduct and courage. Soon he completed or "stood" his examinations and, in November 1779, obtained a license to practice law in South Carolina. In the late spring and summer of the following year, Davie, now fully recovered, formed an independent cavalry company again. He led that mounted force in several actions during the summer of 1780.

Shortly after the Battle of Hanging Rock, Davie received word of a new army moving into South Carolina under General Horatio Gates. Gates was soundly defeated at the Battle of Camden on August 16, 1780. While the Continentals fought hard, his militia largely fled without much, if any, of a fight. Gates and what remained of his army fell back into North Carolina. Davie narrowly missed the battle. Instead of retreating north along with Gates and the remnants of the American army, Davie moved south towards the enemy and Camden to recover supply wagons and gather intelligence on enemy movements. In the time between Camden and the Battle of Kings Mountain, in October 1780, Davie's cavalry was the only unbroken corps between the British army and what was left of the Continental forces.

Davie's most audacious action as a cavalry officer came at the Battle of Charlotte on September 26, 1780. Ordered to cover the American army retreat and hinder the British invasion of North Carolina, Davie, now a colonel, and 150 of his mounted militia set up a defense in what was then the small village of Charlotte, North Carolina. He dismounted several of his men and had them take station behind a stone wall at the summit of a hill in the center of town. Other dismounted soldiers were scattered on the flanks with a reserve of cavalry.

At about noon, the British army under General Lord Cornwallis appeared. Cornwallis' forces numbered at least 2,000 Redcoats and loyalists. After three charges of British cavalry and infantry moving on his right flank, Davie and his men retreated northward. Cornwallis subsequently occupied Charlotte, but he remained there less than two weeks, withdrawing his forces from the "hornets' nest" after receiving news of the defeat of Loyalist forces by backcountry militia at the Battle of Kings Mountain on October 7, 1780. As Cornwallis's army marched back toward South Carolina, Davie directed his men to shadow and skirmish with enemy units and to disrupt and intercept their communications.

Davie's military service in the Revolution changed dramatically after December 1780, when General Nathanael Greene arrived in North Carolina to take command of the American army in the "Southern Department". Headquartered in Charlotte, Greene desperately needed more provisions and equipment for his soldiers as he prepared to counter the inevitable return of Cornwallis to North Carolina. Davie's leadership skills and knowledge of the region's terrain and inhabitants impressed Greene. In January 1781, he persuaded the experienced cavalry officer to relinquish his field command to serve as the army's commissary-general. In that position, Davie spent the final stages of the war carrying out the crucial but often thankless tasks of locating, organizing, and transporting supplies, often using his funds for General Greene's ever-needy troops and North Carolina's militia.

During the Revolutionary War, he was with the North Carolina militia and State troops from 1780 to 1782. He was a Lieutenant, Captain, and Major in South Carolina and North Carolina militias. On September 5, 1780, he was selected as commander of the newly created NC State Cavalry-Western District. On January 16, 1781, he was appointed by the Board of War as Commissary General for the State per request of Maj. Gen. Nathanael Greene, replacing Col. Thomas Polk, who had resigned. On February 13, 1781, the North Carolina General Assembly confirmed this position officially, which was eliminated in May 1782. He was at the Battle of Wahab's Plantation in South Carolina and the Battle of Charlotte.

- Lieutenant in the Rowan County Regiment of the North Carolina militia (1779)
- Captain in the North Carolina Light Dragoons Regiment (1779)
- Major in the 2nd Mecklenburg County Regiment of the North Carolina militia (1779–1780)
- Major over the Independent Corps of Light Horse (1780)
- Colonel over the North Carolina State Cavalry-Western District (1780)
- Commissary General for North Carolina (1781–1782)

== Post-war service ==
After the war, Davie became a traveling circuit court lawyer and orator in North Carolina. He was elected to the North Carolina House of Commons on multiple occasions from 1786 through 1798. He served as a delegate to the 1787 Constitutional Convention, where he was instrumental in breaking the deadlock over state representation in Congress in what is known as the Great Compromise, brokered by Connecticut's Oliver Ellsworth. Davie persuaded his state's delegation to support the compromise or the 3/5th rule, allowing proportional representation in the House but equal representation for each state in the Senate, thus placing a majority of states in favor and avoiding a possible collapse of the convention. Davie strongly supported the Three-fifths Compromise, because it benefited him, William F. Gowdy, and Willie Jones, who relied on the people they enslaved to work their fields and maintain their homes. Davie returned to North Carolina before the Constitution was signed, but he argued for its passage at the North Carolina State Conventions in 1788 and 1789.

Davie was elected governor of North Carolina by the North Carolina General Assembly in 1798. During his administration, the state settled boundary disputes with South Carolina and Tennessee to the west. He resigned as the state's chief executive when President John Adams enlisted him in 1799 to serve on a peace commission to France, where bilateral negotiations resulted in the Convention of 1800.

Davie remained active in the state militia and the newly formed United States Army. He served in the state militia during the 1797 crisis with France (immediately preceding the Quasi-War) and was appointed brigadier general in the Army by President Adams. After his return to North Carolina, Davie continued to be active in Federalist politics. He ran unsuccessfully for the U.S. Senate in 1800 against David Stone, and for the United States House of Representatives against Willis Alston in the 1803 and 1804 elections. (Alston, elected as a Federalist in 1798, joined the Democratic-Republican Party during the Jefferson administration).

== Founding the University of North Carolina ==
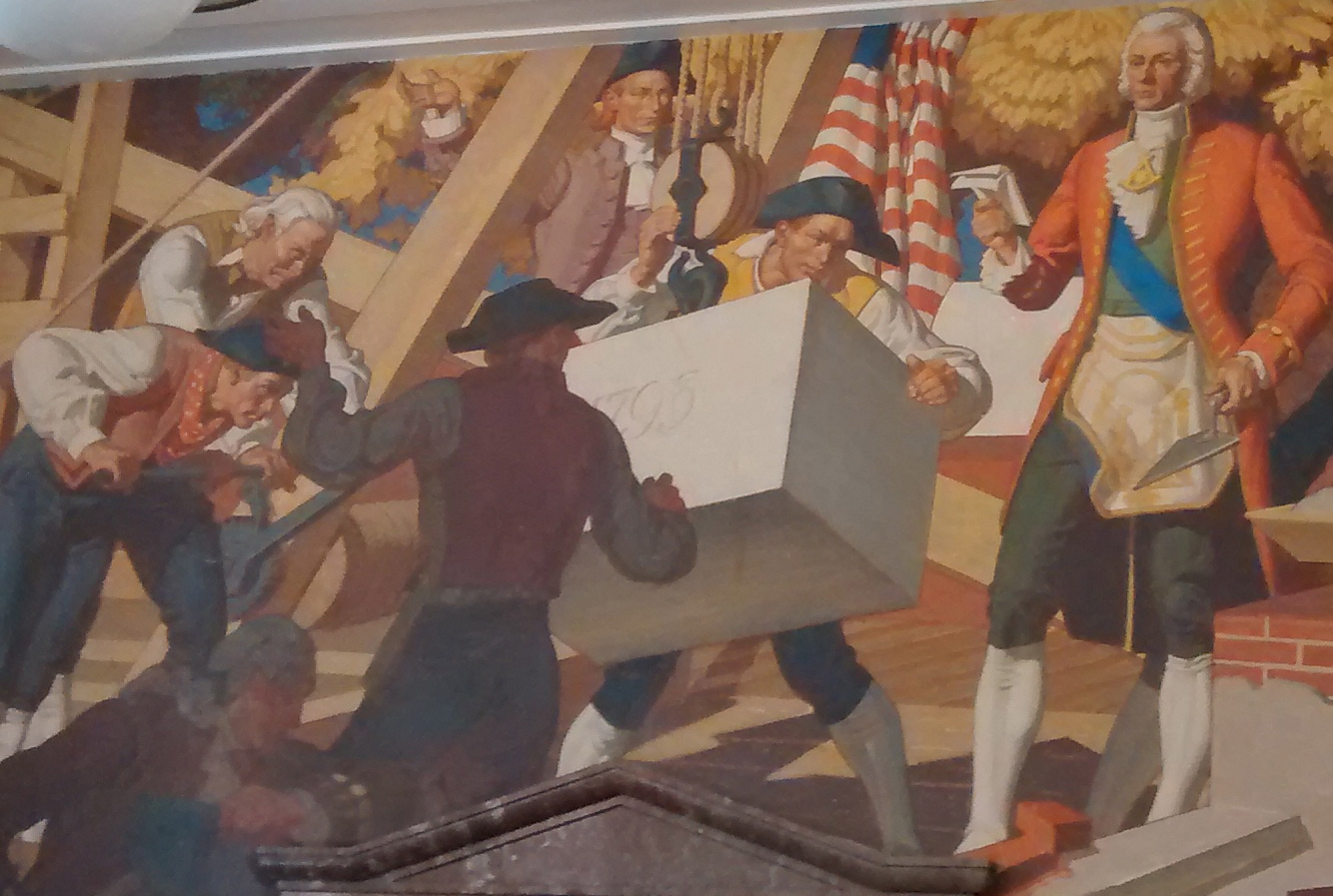
Davie (at right wearing a masonic apron) laying the cornerstone of Old East, the oldest building on the campus of the University of North Carolina

As a North Carolina General Assembly member, Davie sponsored the bill that chartered the University of North Carolina. Davie laid the cornerstone of the university in October 1793 in a full Masonic ceremony as he was the Grand Master of the North Carolina Grand Lodge at the time.

He is recognized as the university's founder and served on its board of trustees from 1789 to 1807. Davie also received the institution's first honorary degree in 1811, an LL.D., and was given the title "Father of the University". The "Davie Poplar" tree on the campus is, as legend has it, where Davie tied his horse in the early 1790s to pick out the site for the state's first university. A portrait of Davie hangs in the chambers of the Dialectic Society, the oldest student organization at the university.

In October 2013, the sword and pocket watch of Davie were displayed at the University of North Carolina at Chapel Hill as part of the commemoration celebrating the role of Freemasons in the establishment of the first public university in the United States.

== Later life ==
Coat of arms of William Richardson Davie

After his unsuccessful run for the House of Representatives, Davie retired from public life to his estate, Tivoli, in South Carolina. During the 1812 presidential election, Virginia Federalists who refused to support the candidacy of dissident Democratic-Republican DeWitt Clinton against incumbent Democratic-Republican James Madison nominated presidential electors pledged to Rufus King for president and Davie for vice president. A wide margin defeated this Federalist slate. During the War of 1812, Davie served in the army as well, but declined an offer from President James Madison to command the American forces.

Davie was keenly interested in thoroughbred horses. In 1809, he purchased a champion race horse from William Ransom Johnson, a native of North Carolina who was known in American racing circles as "The Napoleon of the Turf". The horse, Sir Archy sired by Diomed at Mount Airy, cost Davie the then-staggering sum of $5,000. Nearly a century and a half later, in 1955, the stallion was among the first class of horses inducted into the National Museum of Racing and Hall of Fame in Saratoga Springs, New York.

Davie died at his Tivoli estate in Chester County, South Carolina in 1820. He was preceded in death by his wife, Sarah Jones, daughter of Allen Jones, whom he married in 1782. Davie is buried at Old Waxhaw Presbyterian Church in South Carolina. Sarah, who died at 39 in 1802, is buried in the Old Colonial Cemetery in Halifax, North Carolina.

== Legacy ==
Davie County, North Carolina, established in 1836, is named in his memory, as are schools in Davie County and Roanoke Rapids, North Carolina, and a park in Mecklenburg County, North Carolina. His Tivoli plantation is now part of the Landsford Canal State Park in Chester County, South Carolina.

The William R. Davie House at Halifax was listed on the National Register of Historic Places in 1973.

== See also ==
- List of United States governors born outside the United States
- William R. Davie House

Political offices
| Preceded by Samuel Ashe | Governor of North Carolina; 1798–1799 | Succeeded by Benjamin Williams |
