= Battle of Charlotte =

1780 battle of the American Revolutionary War

- Part of the American Revolutionary War
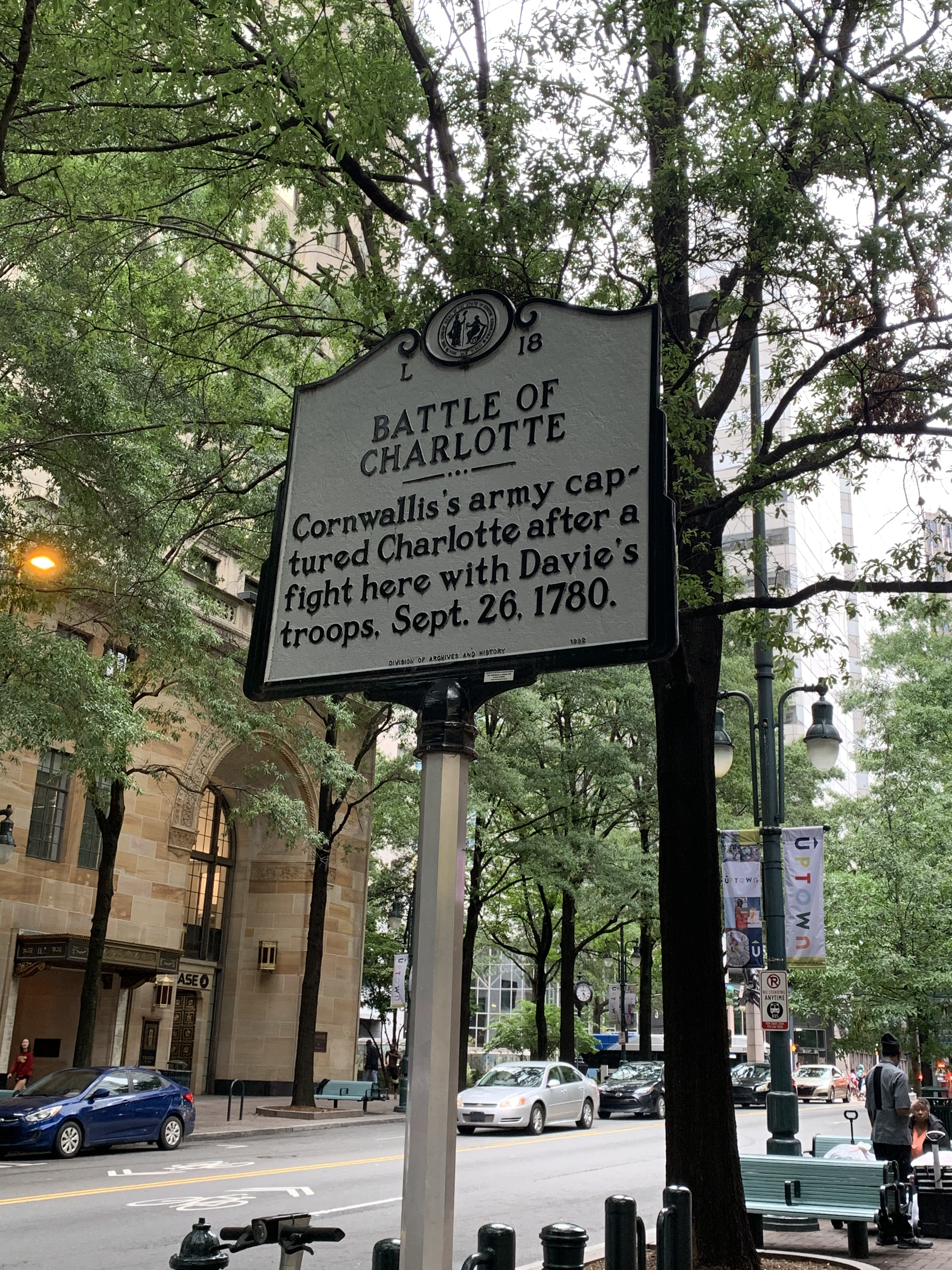
- Plaque commemorating the Battle of Charlotte, located in Charlotte, North Carolina
Date	September 26, 1780
Location	Charlotte, North Carolina 35°13′37″N 80°50′36″W
Result	British victory

Belligerents
Great Britain	United States

Commanders and leaders
George Hanger	William R. Davie

Strength
Unknown	150

Casualties and losses
15-59 killed, wounded or missing	23-30 killed, wounded or captured

The Battle of Charlotte was fought on September 26, 1780 during the American Revolutionary War. It took place at what was then the Mecklenburg County courthouse; which is now the site of the Bank of America tower at Trade and Tryon Streets in uptown Charlotte, North Carolina. An advance guard of General Charles Cornwallis' army rode into town and encountered a well-prepared American militia under the command of William R. Davie in front of the court house. A skirmish ensued in which George Hanger, leading British cavalry, was wounded. The small American force, which had not intended more than token resistance, withdrew north toward Salisbury, North Carolina upon the arrival of Cornwallis and the main army.

== Background ==
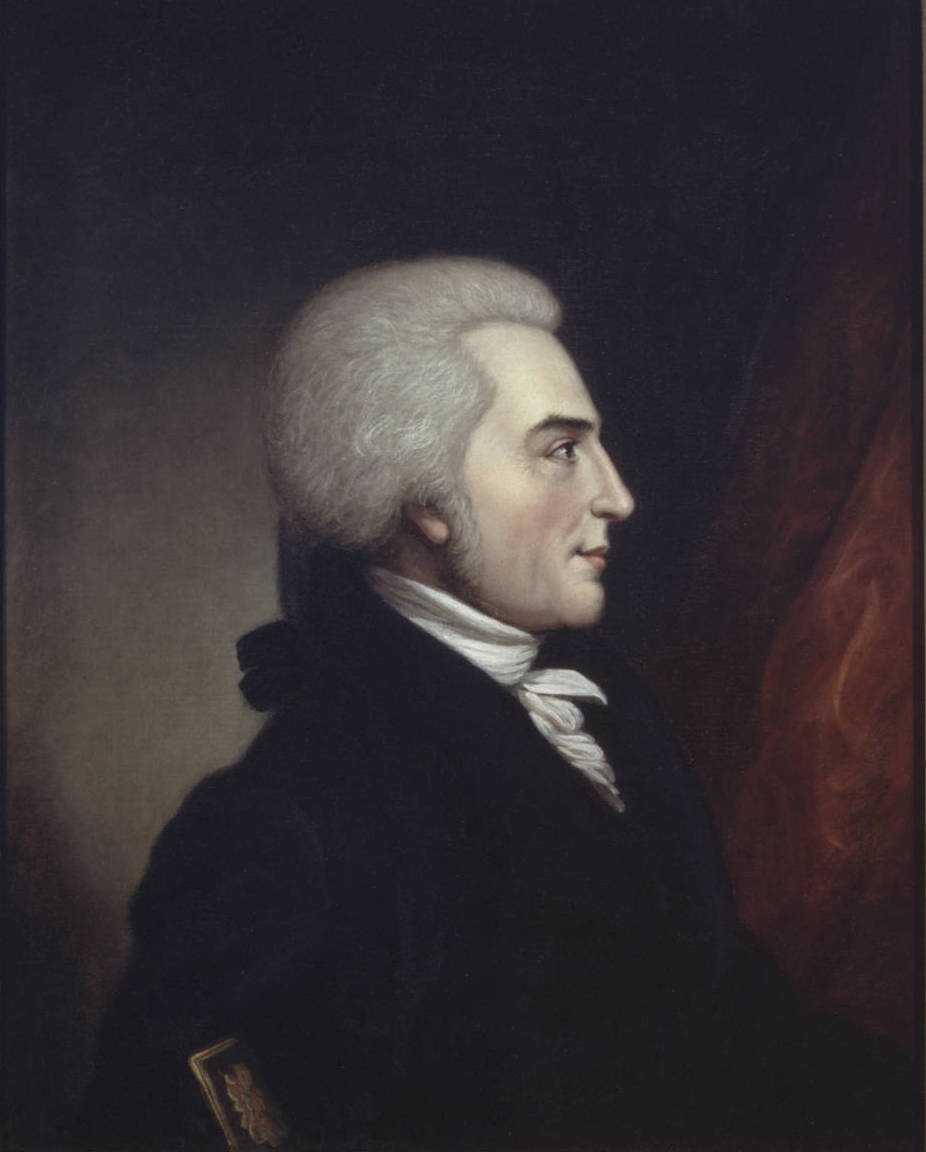
William R. Davie, posthumous portrait by Charles Willson Peale

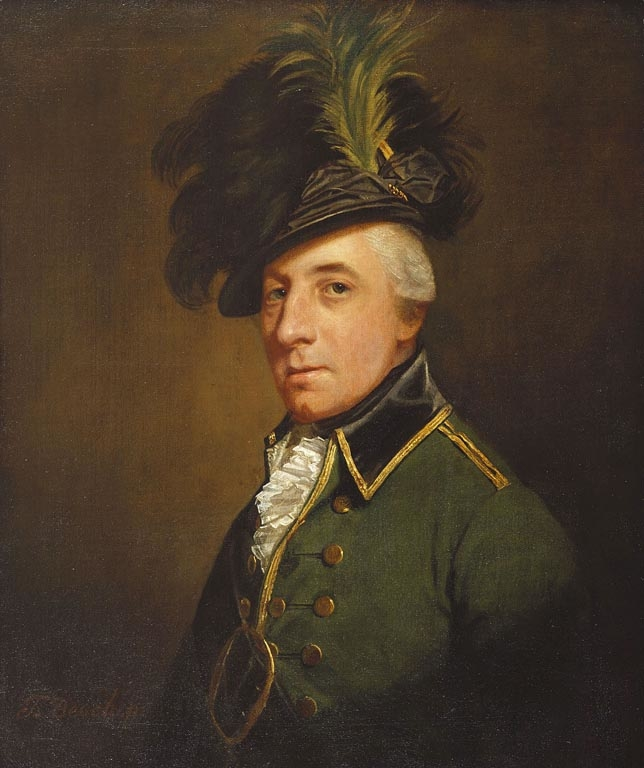
George Hanger, portrait by Thomas Beach

Pursuant to the British "southern strategy" for winning the American Revolutionary War, British forces had captured Charleston, South Carolina early in 1780, and had driven Continental Army forces from South Carolina. Following his rout of the Continental Army at Camden in August 1780, British General Lord Cornwallis paused with his army in the Waxhaws region of northern South Carolina. Believing British and Loyalist forces to be in control of Georgia and South Carolina, he decided to turn north and address the threat posed by the Continental Army remnants in North Carolina. In mid-September he began moving north toward Charlotte, North Carolina.

Cornwallis' movements were shadowed by militia companies from North and South Carolina. One force under Thomas Sumter stayed back and harassed British and Loyalist outposts in the South Carolina backcountry, while another, led by Major William R. Davie, maintained fairly close contact with portions of his force as Cornwallis moved northward. Davie surprised a detachment of Cornwallis' Loyalist forces at Wahab's Plantation on September 20, and then moved on to Charlotte, where he set up an ambush to harass Cornwallis' vanguard.

Charlotte was then a small town, with two main roads crossing at the town center, where the Mecklenburg County courthouse dominated the intersection. The southern facade of the courthouse had a series of pillars, between which a stone wall about 3.5 feet (1.1 m) high had been constructed to provide an area that served as the local market. Davie positioned three rows of militia at and north of the courthouse, with one behind the stone wall, and placed cavalry companies on the east and west sides of the courthouse, covering the roads leading away in those directions. Finally, he put a company of 20 men behind a house on the southern road, where he was expecting the British advance.

As his column approached Charlotte, Cornwallis would normally have sent Lieutenant Colonel Banastre Tarleton and his British Legion to investigate the town. However, Tarleton was ill, so Cornwallis assigned Tarleton's subordinate, Major George Hanger, to enter the town and check for militia, which he expected to be in the area.

== Battle ==
Hanger led the cavalry into town boldly, but incautiously left the infantry behind. Even after the 20 men behind the house opened fire, Hanger's men continued to ride on until he was met by heavy fire from the line of militia behind the stone wall. When the first militia line maneuvered to make way for the second, Hanger misinterpreted their movement as retreat, and continued the charge. This brought him into a withering crossfire from the second line and the cavalry companies stationed to the east and west. Hanger went down with a wound, and his cavalry retreated in some disarray back to the Legion's infantry.

Cornwallis, alerted by the sound of battle, rode forward to assess the situation. Perturbed when the cavalry hesitated to charge again, he shouted “Legion, remember you have everything to lose, but nothing to gain.” Cornwallis then ordered the light infantry forward to support the Legion and they duly cleared the town.

== Aftermath ==
Mark Boatner says the British incurred 15 casualties in the engagement. Patrick O'Kelley says that they had nobody killed but 33 wounded. John S. Pancake says that they had 12 killed and 47 wounded. The Patriot casualties are given by O' Kelley as 5 killed, 6 wounded and 12 captured and by Boatner as 30 killed, wounded or captured.

Hanger termed the incident "a trifling insignificant skirmish", but it did clearly communicate to Cornwallis that he would have to expect further resistance. Hanger then also fell ill, further disabling the effectiveness of Tarleton's Legion. Instead of advancing on Hillsboro, Cornwallis occupied Charlotte. His position was never entirely secure, because the Patriot militia interfered with any significant attempts to communicate with the countryside. Cornwallis' left flank, commanded by Patrick Ferguson, were nearly all killed, wounded, or captured on October 7, 1780 at Kings Mountain. Cornwallis eventually withdrew to Winnsboro, South Carolina in November on reports of persistent Patriot militia activity in South Carolina.

== Sources ==
- Boatner, Mark Mayo, Cassell's Biographical Dictionary of the American War of Independence 1763–1783, Cassell, London, 1966, ISBN 0-304-29296-6.
- O'Kelley, Patrick (2004). Nothing But Blood and Slaughter: Volume Two, 1780. Blue House Tavern Press. ISBN 1-59113-588-5.
- Pancake, John (1985). This Destructive War. University of Alabama Press. ISBN 0-8173-0191-7.
- Wickwire, Franklin and Mary (1970). Cornwallis: the American Adventure. Boston: Houghton Mifflin.
