= Bute County, North Carolina =

Historic county of North Carolina

Coordinates: 36.326°N 78.213°W

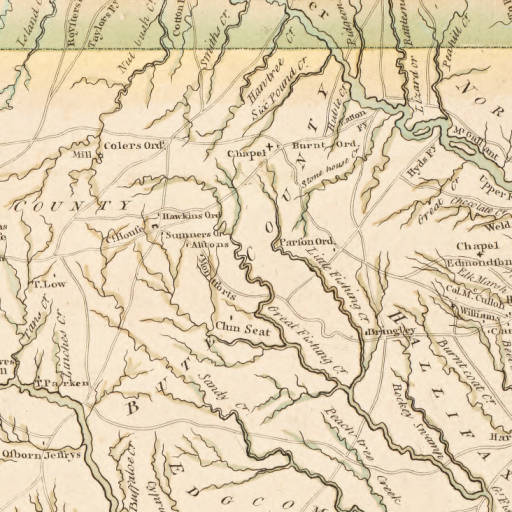
A portion of John Collet's 1770 map of North Carolina depicting the environs of Bute County

Bute County, North Carolina is a former county in eastern North Carolina. In 1779, it was divided into Franklin County and Warren County and ceased to exist.

== History ==
Bute County was established on June 10, 1764, from the eastern part of Granville County by the North Carolina General Assembly and named for John Stuart, 3rd Earl of Bute, Prime Minister of Great Britain from 1762 to 1763. It was formed in order to bring the residents of the eastern half of Granville County with improved access to local government, particularly those residing in St. John's Parish. It was expanded in 1766 to include the northwest part of Northampton County.

The residents of Bute County were very much opposed to British rule. When governor William Tryon called for troops to counter the Regulator Movement in 1768, his orders were ignored by the Bute County militia. In the 1770s, it was claimed that "There were no Tories in Bute". After the Provincial Congress of 1775 and 1776, an act was proposed to divide Bute County. After more than two years of discussion, Bute County was divided on January 20, 1779, generally along the Shocco Creek, with Warren County in the north and Franklin County to the south.

The Bute County courthouse was located along Buffalo Race Path, on land owned by Jethro Sumner. This location is about six miles southeast of Warrenton, North Carolina. There was one other town in Bute County, a town without a post office called Littleton. Most of the records of Bute county are located in Warren County.

== Notable residents ==
- Thomas Eaton
- William Person

== See also ==
- List of former United States counties
- List of North Carolina counties
