= Allen Jones (Continental Congress) =

American politician

Brigadier General Allen Jones
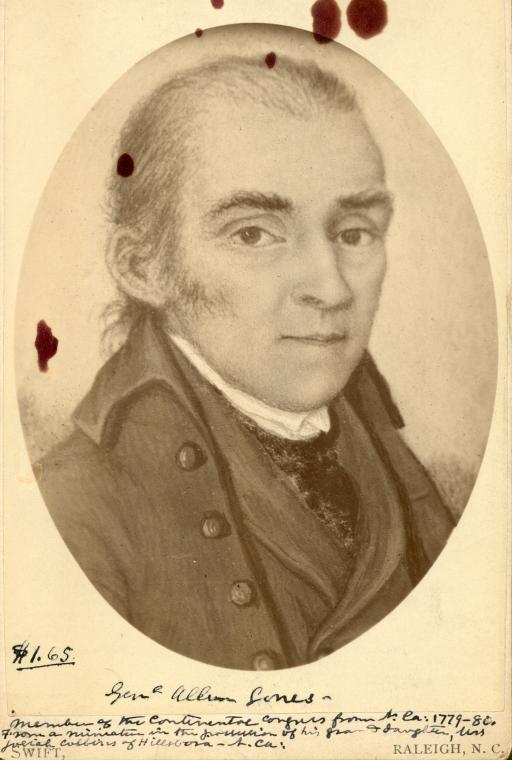
- B.G. Allen Jones
- Born: Allen Jones; December 24, 1739; Edgecombe County, North Carolina (now Halifax)
- Died: November 10, 1798 (aged 58); Northampton County, North Carolina
- Military career
- Allegiance: United States
- Branch: North Carolina militia
- Service years: 1776-1787
- Rank: Brigadier General
- Commands: Northampton County Regiment, Halifax District Brigade

Allen Jones (December 24, 1739 – November 10, 1798) was an American planter, American Revolution brigadier general of the Halifax District Brigade, and statesman from Edgecombe County, North Carolina.

== Early life ==
Allen Jones was born in Edgecombe County, North Carolina (later Halifax County), in the Province of North Carolina. He attended Eton College in England.

== Profession ==
After returning to the colony, he was a member of the Province of North Carolina House of Burgesses between 1773 and 1775 and delegate to the five North Carolina Provincial Congresses (1774–1776), serving as vice-president in the Fourth Provincial Congress.

Jones served in the military throughout the American Revolutionary War (1775–83).

- Colonel over the Northampton County Regiment of Militia (1775–1776)
- Brigadier General over the Halifax District Brigade of North Carolina militia (1776–1783)

He also served in the State senate 1777 to 1779, 1783, 1784, and 1787; and as a Member of the Continental Congress in 1779 and 1780. Jones was a delegate at the state convention that rejected the proposed Constitution of the United States at Halifax, in 1788.

He was the older brother of Congressman Willie (pronounced Wylie) Jones, a leader in neighboring Halifax County. Together they were the source of the Jones surname adopted by the Scottish American naval hero during the Revolutionary War, John Paul Jones — whose birth-surname was Paul. Allen Jones was also the father-in-law of North Carolina Governor and Constitutional Convention delegate William Richardson Davie.

== Death ==
Allen Jones died on his plantation, Mount Gallant, near Roanoke Rapids, Northampton County, North Carolina, on November 10, 1798. Interment was in the private burial ground on his estate.
