= 1830 North Carolina gubernatorial election =

- December 17, 1830
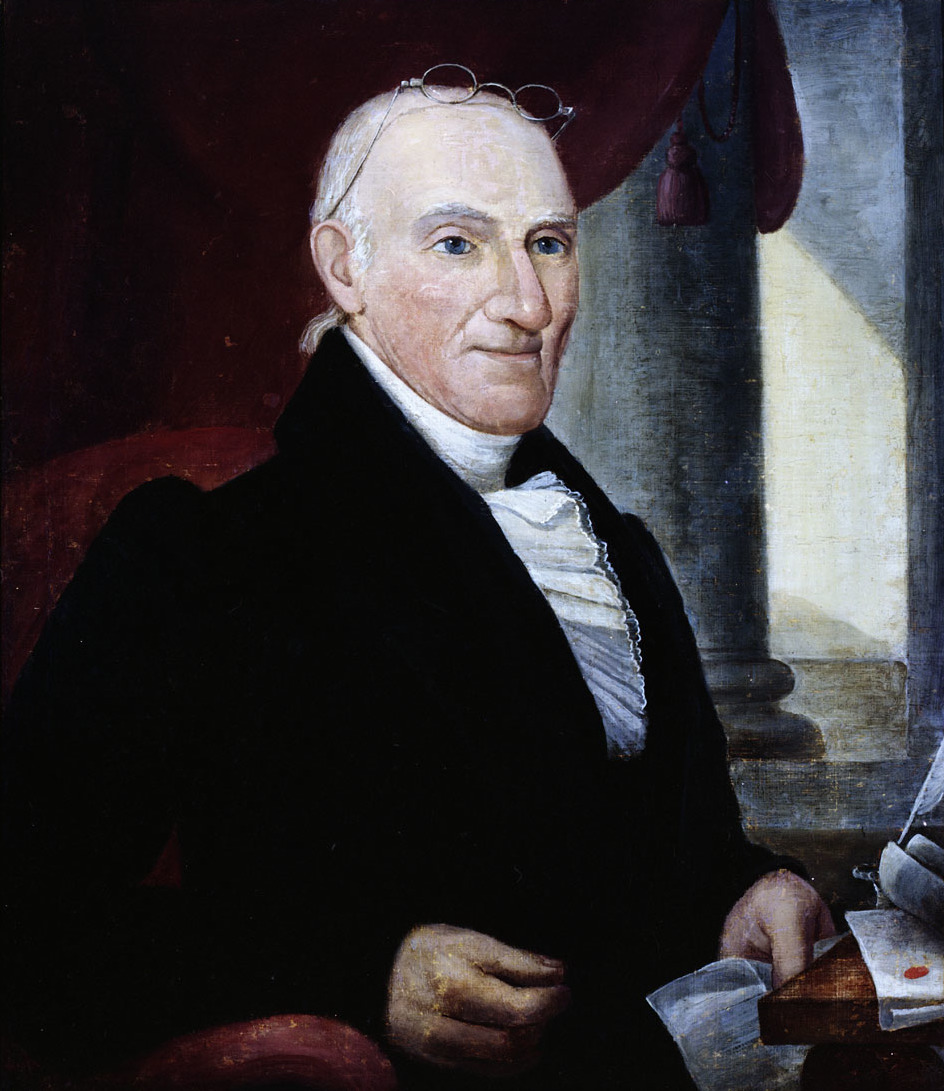

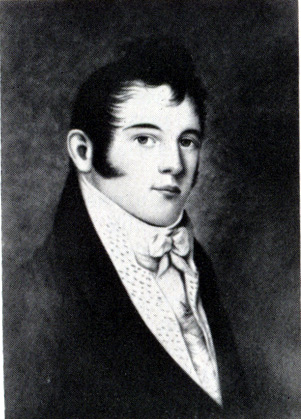
Nominee	Montfort Stokes	Richard Dobbs Spaight Jr.
Party	Democratic-Republican	Democratic-Republican
Popular vote	111	75
Percentage	59.68%	40.32%
Governor before election
John Owen
Democratic-Republican
Elected Governor
Montfort Stokes
Democratic-Republican

The 1830 North Carolina gubernatorial election was held on December 17, 1830, in order to elect the Governor of North Carolina. Democratic-Republican candidate and former United States Senator from North Carolina Montfort Stokes was elected by the North Carolina General Assembly against fellow Democratic-Republican candidate and former member of the U.S. House of Representatives from North Carolina's 4th district Richard Dobbs Spaight Jr.

== General election ==
On election day, December 17, 1830, Democratic-Republican candidate Montfort Stokes was elected by the North Carolina General Assembly by a margin of 36 votes against his opponent fellow Democratic-Republican candidate Richard Dobbs Spaight Jr., thereby retaining Democratic-Republican control over the office of Governor. Stokes was sworn in as the 25th Governor of North Carolina on December 18, 1830.

=== Results ===
North Carolina gubernatorial election, 1830
Party	Candidate	Votes	%
Democratic-Republican	Montfort Stokes	111	59.68
Democratic-Republican	Richard Dobbs Spaight Jr.	75	40.32
Total votes		186	100.00
Democratic-Republican hold			
