= General Cameron =

General Cameron may refer to:

- Alexander Cameron (British Army officer, born 1781) (1781–1850), British Army general
- Alexander Maurice Cameron (1898–1986), British Army lieutenant general
- Sir Alan Cameron of Erracht (1753–1828), British Army lieutenant general
- Archibald Cameron (British Army officer) (1870-1944), British general
- Duncan Cameron (British Army officer) (1808-1888), British general
- George H. Cameron (1861–1944), U.S. Army major general
- John Cameron (1817–1878) (1817–1878), British Army lieutenant general
- Neville Cameron (1873–1955), British Army major general
- Robert Alexander Cameron (1828–1894), Union Army brigadier general and brevet major general
- William Gordon Cameron (1827–1913), British Army general
