= 1831 North Carolina gubernatorial election =

- December 12, 1831
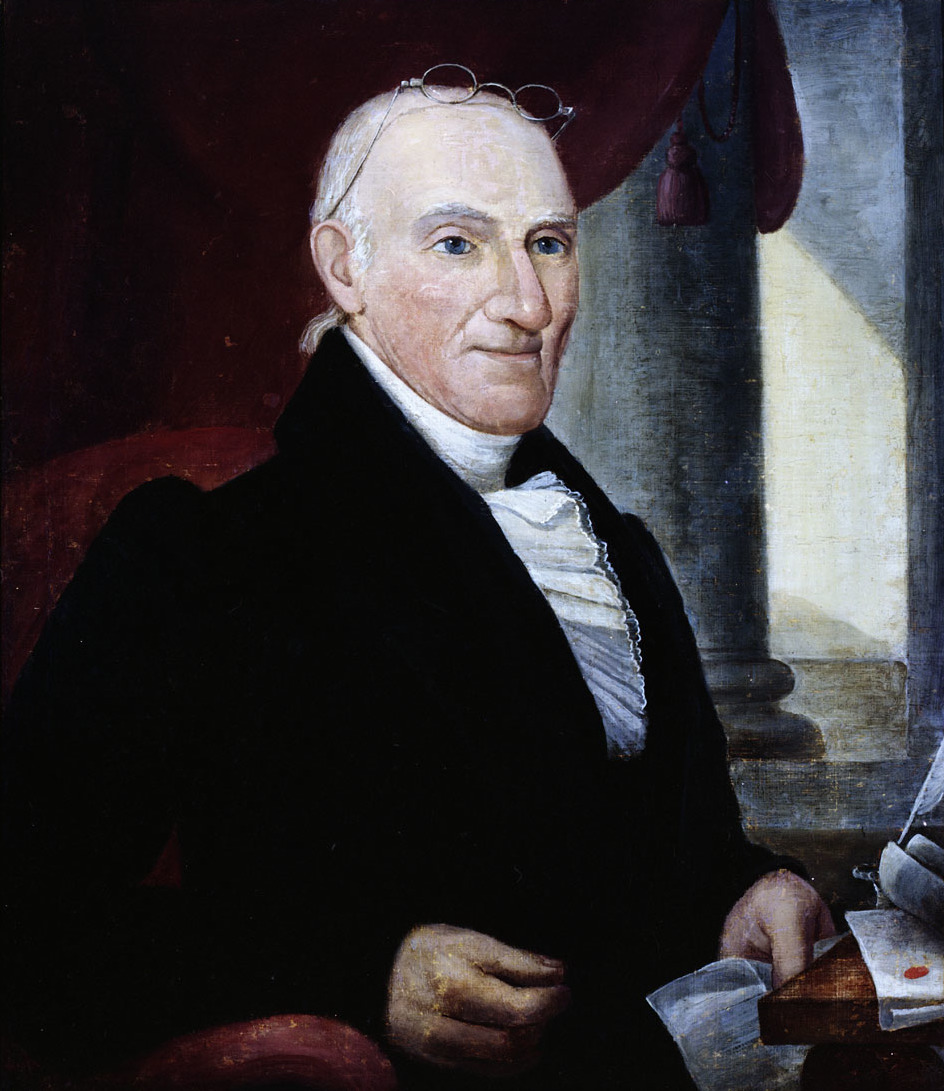

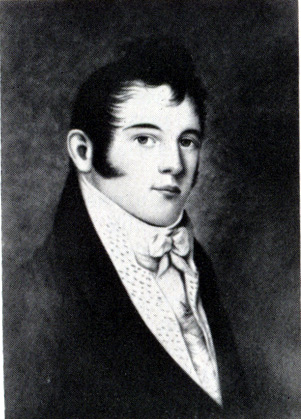
Nominee	Montfort Stokes	Richard Dobbs Spaight Jr.
Party	Democratic-Republican	Democratic-Republican
Popular vote	98	83
Percentage	51.58%	43.68%
Governor before election
Montfort Stokes
Democratic-Republican
Elected Governor
Montfort Stokes
Democratic-Republican

The 1831 North Carolina gubernatorial election was held on December 12, 1831, in order to elect the governor of North Carolina. Incumbent Democratic-Republican governor Montfort Stokes was re-elected by the North Carolina General Assembly against fellow Democratic-Republican candidate and former member of the U.S. House of Representatives from North Carolina's 4th district Richard Dobbs Spaight Jr. in a rematch of the previous election.

== General election ==
On election day, December 12, 1831, incumbent Democratic-Republican governor Montfort Stokes was re-elected by the North Carolina General Assembly by a margin of 15 votes against his opponent fellow Democratic-Republican candidate Richard Dobbs Spaight Jr., thereby retaining Democratic-Republican control over the office of governor. Stokes was sworn in for his second term on December 13, 1831.

=== Results ===
North Carolina gubernatorial election, 1831
Party	Candidate	Votes	%
Democratic-Republican	Montfort Stokes (incumbent)	98	51.58
Democratic-Republican	Richard Dobbs Spaight Jr.	83	43.68
	Scattering	9	4.74
Total votes		190	100.00
Democratic-Republican hold			
