= Jock Cameron (disambiguation) =

Jock Cameron may refer to:

- Jock Cameron (1905–1935), South African cricketer
- Jock Cameron (footballer), Scottish international soccer player

== See also ==
- Jack Cameron (disambiguation), several people
- John Cameron (disambiguation), several people
