= Governor Spaight =

Governor Spaight may refer to:

- Richard Dobbs Spaight (1758–1802), 8th governor of North Carolina
- Richard Dobbs Spaight Jr. (1796–1850), 27th governor of North Carolina
