= List of elections in 1831 =

The following elections occurred in the year 1831.

== North America ==
=== United States ===
==== United States Senate ====
- 1830 and 1831 United States Senate elections
- United States Senate election in New York, 1831
- 1831 United States Senate special election in Pennsylvania

==== United States House of Representatives ====
- 1830 and 1831 United States House of Representatives elections

==== United States lieutenant gubernatorial ====
- 1831 Connecticut lieutenant gubernatorial election

==== United States gubernatorial ====
- 1831 Alabama gubernatorial election
- 1831 Connecticut gubernatorial election
- 1831 Georgia gubernatorial election
- 1831 Indiana gubernatorial election
- 1831 Maine gubernatorial election
- 1831 Maryland gubernatorial election
- April 1831 Massachusetts gubernatorial election
- November 1831 Massachusetts gubernatorial election
- 1831 Mississippi gubernatorial election
- 1831 New Hampshire gubernatorial election
- 1831 New Jersey gubernatorial election
- 1831 North Carolina gubernatorial election
- 1831 Rhode Island gubernatorial election
- 1831 Tennessee gubernatorial election
- 1831 Vermont gubernatorial election
- 1831 Virginia gubernatorial election

==== United States mayoral elections ====
- 1831 Boston mayoral election

== South America ==
- 1831 Chilean parliamentary election
- 1831 Chilean presidential election

== Europe ==
- 1831 Belgian general election
- 1831 French legislative election
- 1830–1831 conclave

=== United Kingdom ===
- 1831 United Kingdom general election

== See also ==
- Category:1831 elections
