= John Cameron =

John Cameron may refer to:

== Arts and entertainment ==
- John Cameron (baritone) (1918–2002), Australian operatic baritone
- John Allan Cameron (1938–2006), Canadian folk singer
- John Cameron (musician) (born 1944), British composer, arranger, conductor and musician

== Law and politics ==
=== Canada ===
- John Cameron (chief) (1764–1828), Mississauga Ojibwa chief
- John Cameron (Upper Canada politician) (1778–1829), farmer and political figure
- John Hillyard Cameron (1817–1876), French-born Ontario lawyer and politician
- John Cameron (Alberta politician) (1845–1919), member of Edmonton's first town council
- John Donald Cameron (1858–1923), judge and politician in Manitoba
- John J. Cameron (1876–1957), Canadian politician
- John Charles Alexander Cameron (1891–1976), member of the House of Commons of Canada
- John Cameron Wilson (fl. 1930), member of the Ontario Provincial Parliament

=== U.K. ===
- John Macdonald Cameron (1847–1912), British MP for Wick Burghs
- John Cameron, Lord Cameron (1900–1996), Scottish judge
- John Cameron, Lord Coulsfield (1934–2016), Scottish judge
- John Cameron, Lord Abernethy (born 1938), Scottish lawyer
- John Cameron (British politician) (born 1969)

=== Elsewhere ===
- John A. Cameron (judge) (1788–1838), American politician and judge in North Carolina and Florida
- John E. Cameron (died 1852), American politician in Wisconsin
- John Cameron (Queensland politician, born 1834) (1834–1902), Australian businessman and alderman
- John Cameron (Queensland politician, born 1845) (1845–1914), Australian member of the Queensland Legislative Assembly

== Military ==
- John Du Cameron (died 1753), Scottish sergeant in the French army
- John Cameron of Fassiefern (1771–1815), Scottish military commander
- John Cameron (British Army officer) (1773–1844), British military commander
- John Cameron (1817–1878), British army officer and director-general of the Ordnance Survey
- John Cameron (Royal Navy officer) (1874–1939)

== Religion ==
- John Cameron (Scottish bishop) (died 1446), bishop of Glasgow
- John Cameron (theologian) (c. 1579–1625), Scottish theologian
- John Cameron (Reformed Presbyterian) (1724–1799), Scottish Presbyterian minister in Ulster
- John Cameron (Canadian bishop) (1827–1910), Canadian Roman Catholic priest and Bishop of Antigonish
- John Kennedy Cameron (1860–1944), minister of the Free Church of Scotland
- John Urquhart Cameron (born 1943), Scottish athlete and churchman

== Science and medicine ==
- John Cameron (anatomist) (1873–1960), Scottish physician and author
- Stewart Cameron (nephrologist) (John Stewart Cameron, 1934–2023) British nephrologist
- John L. Cameron (born 1936), American surgeon

== Sports ==
=== Association football (soccer) ===
- John Cameron (Rangers footballer) (fl. 1886), Scottish footballer
- John Cameron (footballer, born 1868) (1868–1???), Scottish footballer
- John Cameron (footballer, born 1872) (1872–1935), Scottish footballer and player-manager
- John Cameron (footballer, born 1875) (1875–1944), Scottish footballer
- Jock Cameron (footballer) (John Bell Cameron, 1879–1950), Scottish footballer

=== Cricket ===
- John Joseph Cameron (1882–1954), West Indian cricketer
- John Cameron (New Zealand cricketer) (1898–1988), New Zealand cricketer
- John Cameron (West Indian cricketer) (1914–2000), West Indian cricketer

=== Other sports ===
- John Cameron (athlete) (1886–1953), Canadian track and field athlete

== Others ==
- Sir John Cameron of Lochiel (1663–1747), Scottish chief of Clan Cameron and Jacobite
- John Cameron (police officer) (1807–1873), American law enforcement officer during New York Draft Riots
- John A. Cameron (1820–1888), Canadian prospector
- John William Cameron (1841–1896), English brewer
- John Brewer Cameron (1843–1897), geodetic surveyor in Australia
- John Cameron (farmer), Scottish farmer involved with ScotRail

== See also ==
- Jack Cameron (disambiguation)
- John Cameron-Cameron, a character played by Dickie Goodman in a series of novelty records
- Cameron John (disambiguation)
