= John Adams Cameron =

American jurist (1788–1838)

Judge of the Western District of Florida Territory
- In office 1832–1836
- President: Andrew Jackson

Member of the North Carolina House of Representatives
- In office 1820–1821
- In office 1810–1812

Personal details
- Born: 1788 Mecklenberg County, Virginia, United States
- Died: June 14–15, 1838
- Cause of death: Steamship Pulaski disaster
- Spouse: Eliza Adam (m. 1814, death) Catherine Halliday (m. 1818)
- Children: 6
- Profession: Publisher, politician

Military service
- Allegiance: United States
- Years of service: 1812-1815
- Rank: Major

John Adams Cameron (1788 – June 14 or 15, 1838) was an American attorney, politician, and jurist from North Carolina and Territorial Florida. He was a member of the North Carolina House of Commons from 1810 to 1812 and in 1820. After several failed campaigns to represent Fayetteville, North Carolina in the United States House of Representatives, president Andrew Jackson nominated him to become a judge of the Florida Territorial Courts, where he served until his death in the Steamship Pulaski disaster.

== Early life and education ==
John Adams Cameron was born in Mecklenberg County, Virginia in 1788. His mother, Anne Owen Nash, was Abner Nash's niece, while his father, John Cameron, was an influential Episcopalian minister in Virginia.

In 1796, Cameron and his older brother, Duncan Cameron, moved to North Carolina. The younger Cameron attended the University of North Carolina at Chapel Hill, earning his A.B. degree in 1806 and his master's degree three years later. After studying law and practicing in Fayetteville, he was elected to represent Fayetteville the North Carolina House of Commons in 1810, 1811, 1812, and 1820. While he ran for a seat in the United States House of Representatives in 1813 as a Federalist, he lost in the ensuing election to John Culpepper, also a Federalist.

Cameron fought for the United States in the War of 1812, and was promoted to the rank of major. Along with David B. Gillespie, he led a regiment of the first infantry brigade of the North Carolina militia. During the war, he developed a friendship with major general Andrew Jackson, who would eventually become the seventh President of the United States.

== Career ==
Cameron served as the editor of the Fayetteville-based North Carolina Journal from 1825 until he sold it in 1830. During this time, he was actively supporting Andrew Jackson and Jacksonianism. He again ran for the United States House of Representatives in 1827 and 1829, but was unsuccessful both times, losing to John Culpepper and Edmund Deberry, respectively. In 1831, then-President Andrew Jackson appointed Cameron as the United States consul to Veracruz, Mexico.

In 1832, Jackson nominated Cameron for a four-year term to replace Henry Marie Brackenridge as the judge of the Western District of the Florida Territorial Courts, after his first nomination, James C. Bryce, was rejected by the Senate. In his correspondence, Cameron often complained about his travel obligations and workload as a judge. Jackson again nominated Cameron to the position in 1836.

== Personal life and death ==
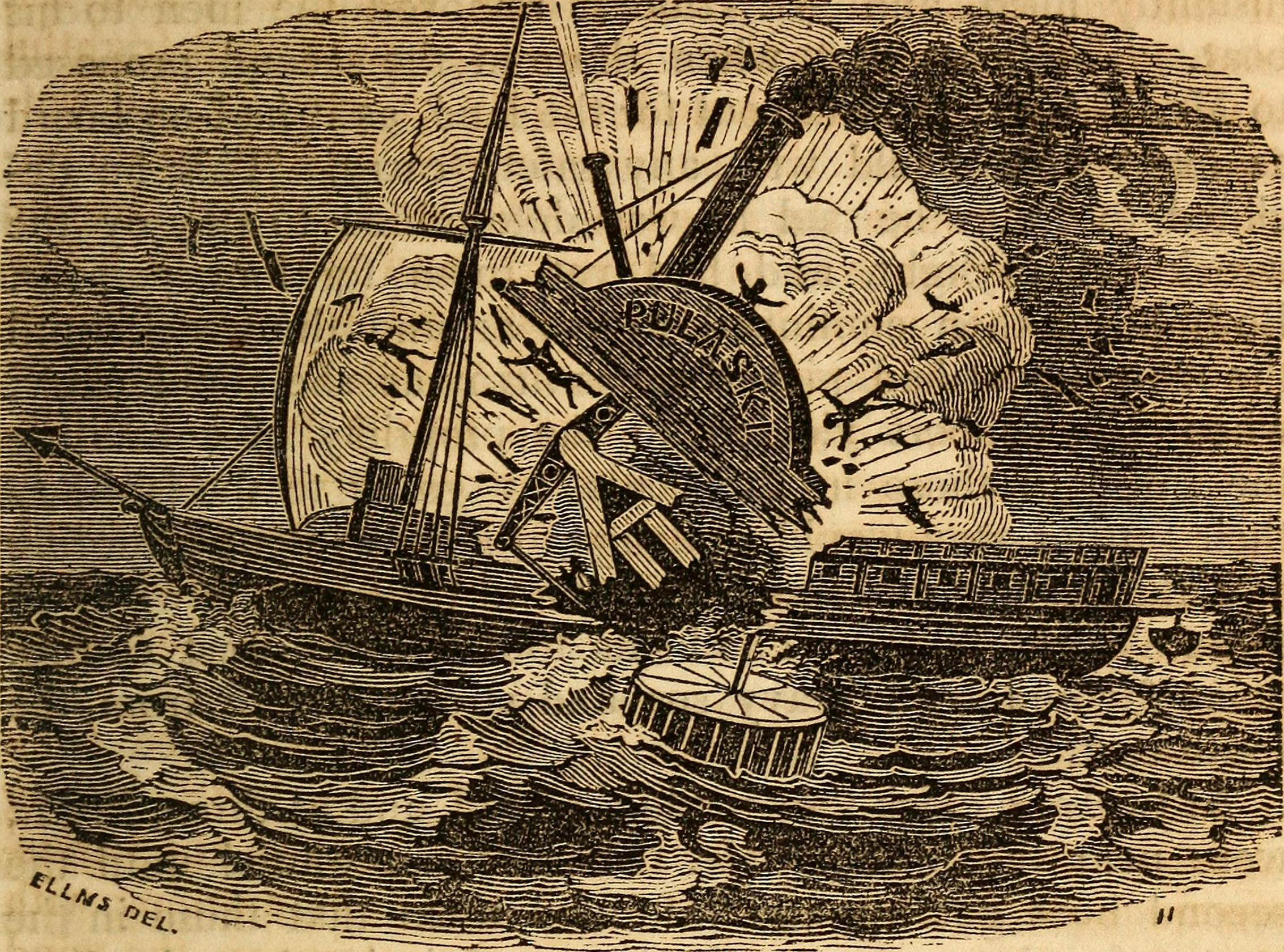
An illustration of the Steamship Pulaski disaster, in which Cameron died

Cameron was a Freemason, and in 1820 and 1821, he served as the Grand Master of the Grand Lodge of North Carolina.

Cameron often sold his land and property throughout his life to sustain himself financially. Cameron married twice. He had one daughter in his first marriage with Eliza Adam, a Scottish musician who died of tuberculosis. He married his second wife, Catherine Halliday, on November 19, 1818; the couple had five children.

Cameron drowned in the Steamship Pulaski disaster on the evening of June 14, 1838.
