= Cameron John =

Cameron John may refer to:

- Cameron John (footballer)
- Cameron John (golfer)

== See also ==
- John Cameron (disambiguation)
