= James Owen (American politician) =

American politician (1784–1865)

Member of the U.S. House of Representatives from North Carolina's 5th district
- In office March 4, 1817 – March 3, 1819
- Preceded by: Charles Hooks
- Succeeded by: Charles Hooks

Member of the North Carolina House of Commons from Bladen County
- In office November 21, 1808 – December 23, 1811 Serving with Thomas Brown
- Preceded by: David Gillespie; James Bunbury White
- Succeeded by: David Gillespie; John Owen

Personal details
- Born: December 6, 1784 Bladen County, North Carolina, U.S.
- Died: September 4, 1865 (aged 80) Wilmington, North Carolina, U.S.
- Resting place: Oakdale Cemetery, Wilmington, North Carolina, U.S.
- Party: Democratic-Republican
- Spouse: Eliza Murley Mumford
- Relatives: John Owen (brother)
- Education: Pittsboro Academy
- Profession: Planter; politician; militia officer

Military service
- Branch: North Carolina militia
- Rank: Adjutant general
- Wars: War of 1812

James Owen (December 6, 1784 – September 4, 1865) was an American politician from North Carolina, a planter, adjutant general, businessman, and slave owner, including of Omar ibn Said. He was educated at William Bingham's Academy in Pittsboro. Subsequently, he was for many years president of the Wilmington and Raleigh Railroad and an adjutant general in the North Carolina militia during the War of 1812. His brother John Owen was governor of North Carolina.

Omar ibn Said describing his two enslavers

Owen was a member of the North Carolina House of Commons from 1808 to 1811 and a Democratic-Republican party U.S. congressman from North Carolina's 5th congressional district from 1817 to 1819. He died in 1865 and was interred at Oakdale Cemetery, Wilmington. He was a devoted Presbyterian and was a member of the First Presbyterian Church of Fayetteville, North Carolina, and an officer in the Fayetteville chapter of the American Bible Society.

James Owen succeeded Edward B. Dudley as president of the Wilmington & Raleigh Railroad (later renamed the Wilmington & Weldon Railroad in 1855). Under his leadership, he played a key role in developing a rail rode via Weldon that connected Wilmington with major northern markets. Upon its completion in 1840, the 161.5 mile line became the longest railroad in the world at that time, significantly impacting regional transportation and commerce in antebellum North Carolina. Moreover, Owen's relationship with Omar ibn Said, an educated Muslim scholar whom Owen enslaved, demonstrated an unexpected cultural complexity. Capable of writing in Arabic, Ibn Said lived in Owen's household and received both an English translation of the Quran and an Arabic Bible; reflecting his owner's unusual accommodation of Ibn Said's faith and learning.

U.S. House of Representatives
Preceded by Charles Hooks	Member of the U.S. House of Representatives from North Carolina's 5th congressional district 1817–1819	Succeeded by Charles Hooks
Preceded by David Gillespie; James Bunbury White	Member of the North Carolina House of Commons from Bladen County; 1808–1811; Served alongside: Thomas Brown	Succeeded by David Gillespie; John Owen
