= Rachel Montgomery Stokes =

First Lady of North Carolina (1830–1832)

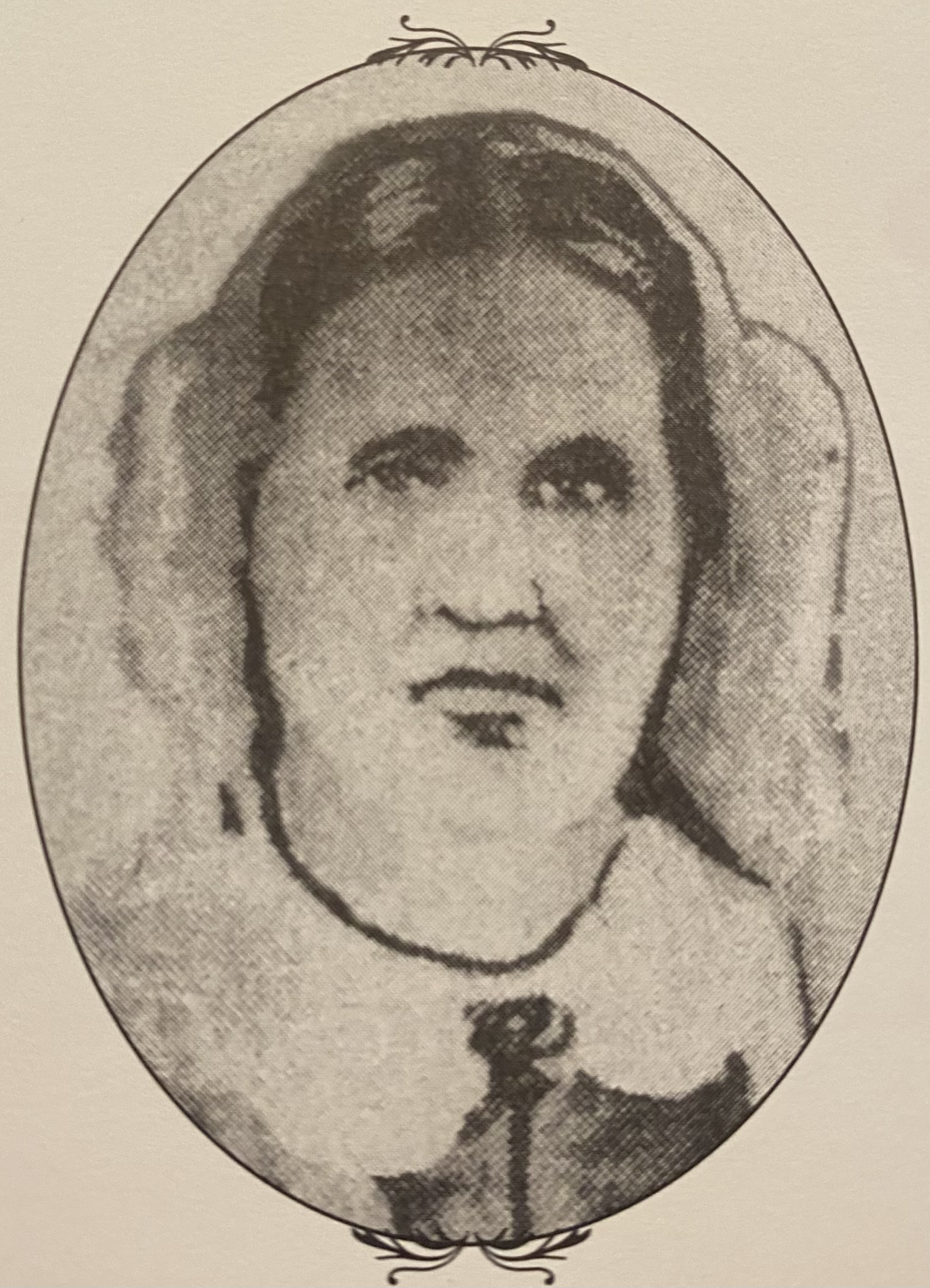

First Lady of North Carolina
- In office December 18, 1830 – December 6, 1832
- Governor: Montfort Stokes
- Preceded by: Lucy Ann Brown Owen
- Succeeded by: Eleanor White Swain

Personal details
- Born: October 25, 1776 Wilkesboro, North Carolina, U.S.
- Died: November 1862 (aged 86) Wilkesboro, North Carolina, U.S.
- Resting place: Stokes Family Cemetery
- Spouse: Montfort Stokes
- Children: 10
- Occupation: planter, slave owner

Rachel Montgomery Stokes (1776–1862) was an American heiress and landowner who, as the wife of Montford Stokes, served as First Lady of North Carolina from 1830 to 1832. She inherited Morne Rouge Plantation from her father.

== Biography ==
Stokes was the daughter of Hugh Montgomery of Salisbury, North Carolina, a wealthy colonial merchant landowner from England who bought his land in Western North Carolina from Moravian settlers. She grew up at Morne Rouge, her father's 10,000-acre plantation north of Wilkesboro. Upon her father's death, the plantation was divided in half between Stokes and her sister, Rachel.

She married Montfort Stokes, becoming his second wife, in 1796. They had five sons and five daughters. The family lived at Morne Rouge. Stokes also owned a home, called The Bend, along the Yadkin River and a 500-acre stock farm in Ashe County.

From 1830 to 1832, her husband served as the governor of North Carolina and she served as the state's first lady. Her husband was later elected to the United States Senate.

She died in November 1862 and was buried in the family cemetery at Morne Rouge. Following her death, her estate was auctioned off, including farmland, livestock, furniture, and slaves.
