= David Gillespie (surveyor) =

American surveyor (1774–1829)

North Carolina Councilor of State
- In office December 6, 1817 – December 1824

Member of the North Carolina House of Commons from Bladen County
- In office November 16, 1812 – December 25, 1813 Serving with John Owen
- Preceded by: Thomas Brown; James Owen
- Succeeded by: James J. Cummings; John Sellers
- In office November 16, 1807 – December 18, 1807 Serving with James Bunbury White
- Preceded by: Amos Richardson
- Succeeded by: Thomas Brown; James Owen

Personal details
- Born: April 5, 1774 Duplin County, Province of North Carolina
- Died: September 28, 1829 (aged 55) Bladen County, North Carolina, U.S.
- Party: Democratic-Republican
- Spouse: Sarah Street (m. 1802)
- Children: 12
- Parents: James Gillespie (father); Dorcas Mumford (mother)
- Education: University of North Carolina
- Occupation: Planter; engineer; surveyor; military officer; politician

Military service
- Branch/service: U.S. Army; North Carolina militia
- Rank: Second Major
- Unit: First Brigade, 4th Regiment
- Battles/wars: War of 1812

David B. Gillespie (April 5, 1774 – September 28, 1829) was an American land surveyor and politician. He was the first person granted a document in the nature of a diploma from what is today the University of North Carolina at Chapel Hill. He received the document prior to leaving the university in 1796 to assist the astronomer Andrew Ellicott with determining the Southern boundary of the United States after the 1795 Treaty of San Lorenzo with Spain. Gillespie was a member of the North Carolina House of Commons from Bladen County, served on the North Carolina Council of State, and in the North Carolina militia as a second major in the War of 1812.

== Early life and education ==
David B. Gillespie, the son of James Gillespie and Dorcas Mumford Gillespie, was born on April 5, 1774, in Duplin County in the Province of North Carolina. He attended the University of North Carolina in Chapel Hill. He was a founding member of the Concord Society, which later became the Philanthropic Society, along with his younger brother Joseph, and was its first president. The Concord Society's first meeting was held on August 10, 1795. The Concord Society split from the older Debating Society, which became the Dialectic Society, possibly due to several reasons including a disagreement about having an officer position known as the Censor Morum. A reason is not listed in the journal of the society. The Censor Morum had grand powers and duties and was intended "to inspect the conduct and morals of the members and report to the society those who preserve inattention to the studies of the University, in neglect of their duties as members, or in acting in such a manner as to reflect disgrace on their fellow-members." Gillespie motioned for the Concord Society to be renamed the Greek Philanthropic Society on August 29, 1796. Kemp P. Battle wrote he "was evidently a most promising student." Gillespie became the first person to receive a certificate in his name "in the nature of a diploma" by the university before he left to be the assistant to the secretary, Andrew Ellicott, on the commission to determine the Southern and Western boundary of the United States with Spanish Florida and Louisiana.

We, the undersigned Professors of the University of North Carolina, have had under our particular care Mr. David Gillespie of this State. He has studied Greek and Latin and the elementary Mathematics in their application to Surveying, Navigation, etc. He has also read under our care Natural Philosophy and Astronomy. His behavior, while at this place, has met with our warmest approbation. Mr. Gillespie, being about to leave the University to attend Mr. Ellicott in determining the Southern boundary of the United States, we have thought proper to give him this certificate.

— Chas. W. Harris
Prof. of Math. and N. Phil.
Sam'l Holmes
Prof. of Lang.
W. L. Richards
Teacher of French and English
University, N. C., September 22, 1796.

== Career ==
George Washington appointed Ellicott as commissioner and Thomas Freeman as surveyor to determine the thirty-first parallel in cooperation with a Spanish commission first led by the astronomer William Dunbar and after Dunbar returned to his home in September 1798, by the Spanish's surveyor, Stephen Minor. David Gillespie accepted the position of assistant surveyor for Ellicott, and was one of two assistants of Ellicott, the other being his son Andrew Ellicott Jr. (Note: One source mentions an assistant to Ellicott with the last name Walker, however, Juan Pedro Walker was a trilingual assistant surveyor on the Spanish commission born in New Orleans in 1781 to a French mother and English father. He accompanied Ellicott Jr. and Gillespie on the measurements southward to the 31st parallel in early 1798.) The original surveyor of the commission was Thomas Freeman, who likely attained the position through political means. Freeman quarreled with, was thought to have acted "improper" and to be "insufferably arrogant", and "a detriment to the work of running the line" by Ellicott, who suggested for Freeman to be removed. A letter written by the Secretary of State, Timothy Pickering, to Ellicott about Freeman's conduct mentions his actions were considered "wholly unwarrantable". Gillespie was appointed surveyor pro tempore for the United States boundary commission by Ellicott in Freeman's stead and afterwards was made the chief surveyor after the work began. Gillespie started the measurements of the guideline between the "Coenecuh to the Chattahoochee." During the measurements he was accompanied by a Spanish and American military escort with two chiefs and two warriors of the Creek tribe.

The survey encountered some difficulties with the Native Americans, namely the Eufala, the Seminole, and the Upper Creek, and Ellicott at times feared for Gillespie's safety in some of his writings. In one letter to Ellicott, Gillespie mentioned that Miccosukee warriors under their king, "a man of violent passions", had set out on July 4, 1799, to stop the surveyors. The Miccosukee leader calmed after hearing from the representatives of Spain and the United States. Gillespie also wrote to his father James about the political events that surrounded the transfer of the Natchez region, near present-day Natchez, Mississippi, to the United States in 1795. Some of his letters indicate his dissatisfaction with Ellicott. After his United States Survey of the Coast Service, he was a member of the North Carolina House of Commons and represented Bladen County in 1807 and during the War of 1812, from 1812 to 1813.

In the War of 1812, Gillespie served as a second major of the Fourth Regiment of the First Brigade of the North Carolina militia. He served under lieutenant colonel Alfred Rowland, the grandfather of U.S. congressman Alfred Rowland.

He was first elected to the North Carolina Council of State by the General Assembly of 1817 on December 6, 1817. He remained a councilor for several years, and was last elected as a councilor on December 18, 1823, by the General Assembly of 1823.

In 1825, after the 1824 United States presidential election, Gillespie gave a speech at an event attended by Samuel Polk, William Polk, and others, which was held in honor of Andrew Jackson.

Gillespie died in Bladen County, North Carolina, on September 28, 1829.

== Personal life ==
David Gillespie was the son of James Gillespie, a U.S. congressman, and Dorcas Mumford Gillespie. He married Sarah Street, daughter of Richard and Elizabeth Clopton Street. Gillespie owned a number of slaves and a plantation, known as Lebanon Plantation in Carver's Creek.

One of his daughters, Elizabeth (also known as Eliza), at the age of 14 married John A. Robeson, a descendant of Col. William Bartram, the uncle of the naturalist. Robeson inherited Bartram's plantation, known as Ashwood. Elizabeth, along with a slave known as Dorcas, purported to have seen two ghosts at the plantation and it was consequently pulled down in 1856 or 1857.

Gillespie had twelve children with his wife Sarah:

- James Gillespie I (July 23, 1803 – January 19, 1804)
- Rebecca S. Gillespie (1804 – September 3, 1812)
- James Gillespie II (November 8, 1804 – June 3, 1847) married Susan O'Brien Flowers on November 29, 1829.
- Richard Street Gillespie (September 12, 1806 – July 9, 1878) married Elizabeth Flowers on June 5, 1832.
- Joseph Mumford Gillespie (May 3, 1808 – December 8, 1848)
- Elizabeth "Eliza" Street Gillespie (January 28, 1810 – June 2, 1898) married John Alexander Robeson on November 25, 1824.
- George Street Gillespie (October 28, 1811 – October 20, 1865) married Elizabeth "Eliza" Coddington Robeson on June 21, 1843.
- Ann Clopton Gillespie (April 13, 1813 – August 12, 1862) married James Gillespie Dickson on April 14, 1835.
- David B. Gillespie (February 28, 1815 – January 2, 1905) married Sarah Ann Davis on November 20, 1844.
- Albert Gillespie (September 25, 1817 – February 1, 1850) married Caroline F. Jones.
- Sarah Gillespie (January 22, 1820 – June 14, 1887) married David Flowers on December 12, 1843.
- Lucy Jane Gillespie (January 22, 1825 – February 14, 1889) married Thomas Jones Robeson on July 23, 1850.

== Legacy ==
In 1936, twenty-three papers of Ellicott and Gillespie's manuscripts from their survey were accessible at the Library of Congress's division of manuscripts. Today additional papers have been donated to the Library of Congress. The documents in the collection are dated from the late 1770s to 1801. Some of Gillespie's papers have been digitized by the University of North Carolina at Chapel Hill Libraries as part of the Southern Historical Collection at the Wilson Special Collections Library. A letter, fragments of legal documents, and a list of accounts written by Gillespie can be found at the Dolph Briscoe Center for American History on the campus of the University of Texas at Austin.

== Bibliography ==
- Weeks, Stephen Beauregard, ed. (1887). Register of Members of the Philanthropic Society, Instituted in the University of North Carolina, August 1st, 1795. Fourth Edition, Revised and Enlarged. "Virtue, Liberty and Science.". Raleigh, North Carolina: Edwards, Broughton & Co., Power Printers and Binders – via University of North Carolina at Chapel Hill Libraries.
- Battle, Kemp P. (1907). History of the University of North Carolina: From its Beginning to the Death of President Swain, 1789–1868. Vol. I. Raleigh, North Carolina: Edwards & Broughton Printing Company – via the Internet Archive. This article incorporates text from this source, which is in the public domain.
- Rowland, Dunbar (1907). Encyclopedia of Mississippi History: Comprising Sketches of Counties, Towns, Events, Institutions and Persons. Vol. I. Madison, Wisconsin: Selwyn A. Brant – via the Internet Archive.
- Connor, R. D. W. (1913). A Manual of North Carolina issued by the North Carolina Historical Commission for the use of Members of the General Assembly session 1913 (PDF). Raleigh, North Carolina: E. M. Uzzell & Co., State Printers.
- Fortier, Alcée (1914). Louisiana: Comprising Sketches of Parishes, Towns, Events, Institutions, and Persons, Arranged in Cyclopedic Form. Vol. I. Madison, Wisconsin: Century Historical Association – via the Internet Archive.
- Allen, Sarah Cantey Whitaker (1935). Our Children's Ancestry. Milledgeville, Georgia, US: Sarah Cantey Whitaker Allen – via the Internet Archive.
- McReynolds, Edwin C. (1988) [1957]. The Seminoles. Norman, Oklahoma: University of Oklahoma Press. ISBN 978-0-8061-1255-8. LCCN 57-11198 – via Google Books.
- Pinnen, Christian; Weeks, Charles (2021). "V: A Gulf Coast, 1779–1821". Colonial Mississippi: A Borrowed Land. Jackson, Mississippi: University Press of Mississippi. doi:10.2307/j.ctv1j55gt4.8. ISBN 978-1496832702. JSTOR j.ctv1j55gt4. LCCN 2020051280.
