= Charles Hooks =

American politician

Charles Hooks (February 20, 1768 – October 18, 1843) was a United States representative from North Carolina; born in Bertie County, North Carolina, February 20, 1768; when he was two years old his parents moved to Duplin County, North Carolina and settled on a plantation near Kenansville. He became a planter. He was a member of the State house of commons 1801–1805; served in the State senate in 1810 and 1811; elected as a Democratic-Republican to the Fourteenth Congress to fill the vacancy caused by the resignation of William R. King and served from December 2, 1816 to March 4, 1817; elected to the Sixteenth, Seventeenth, and Eighteenth Congresses (March 4, 1819 – March 4, 1825); moved to Alabama in 1826, settled near Montgomery, and again engaged in planting; died near Montgomery, Ala., October 18, 1843; interment in the Molton family cemetery. Hooks was the great-grandfather of William Julius Harris.

== See also ==
- Fourteenth United States Congress
- Sixteenth United States Congress
- Seventeenth United States Congress
- Eighteenth United States Congress

U.S. House of Representatives
Preceded by William R. King	Member of the U.S. House of Representatives from North Carolina's 5th congressional district 1816–1817	Succeeded by James Owen
Preceded by James Owen	Member of the U.S. House of Representatives from North Carolina's 5th congressional district 1819–1825	Succeeded by Gabriel Holmes
