= David L. Swain =

American judge

David Lowry Swain
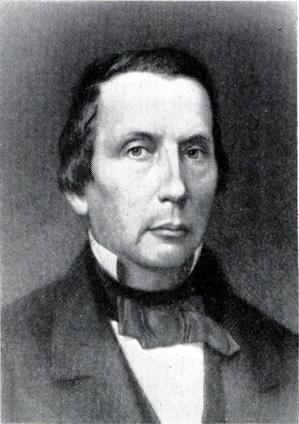

26th Governor of North Carolina
- In office December 6, 1832 – December 10, 1835
- Preceded by: Montfort Stokes
- Succeeded by: Richard Dobbs Spaight Jr.

Member of the North Carolina General Assembly
- In office 1824–1830

Personal details
- Born: January 4, 1801 Buncombe County, North Carolina, US
- Died: August 27, 1868 (aged 67) Chapel Hill, North Carolina, US
- Party: Whig
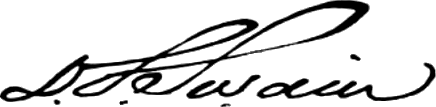
- Signature

David Lowry Swain (January 4, 1801 – August 27, 1868) was the 26th governor of the U.S. state of North Carolina, from 1832 to 1835.

== Early life ==
He was born in Buncombe County, North Carolina; his father, George Swain, was a farmer and a member of the North Carolina General Assembly.

He received his early education at New Academy near Asheville and briefly attended the University of North Carolina, where he was a member of the Dialectic Society. Swain left his university studies in 1821 after only four months to study law with Chief Justice John Louis Taylor of the North Carolina Supreme Court; he was admitted to the bar in 1823.

== Career ==
The citizens of Buncombe County chose Swain as their representative in the North Carolina General Assembly from 1824 to 1830; he was appointed to the state Superior Court as a judge, serving from 1830 to 1832.

Swain resigned as a judge to accept the vote of the North Carolina General Assembly to serve as governor; at the time he was the youngest governor in state history, and the first to belong to the Whig Party. As governor, Swain was a promoter of internal improvements, including railroads and education, although he received little support from the legislature. In 1835, he was a leading delegate to the state constitutional convention; his last act as governor was to issue the proclamation declaring the ratification of 1835's extensive amendments to the Constitution of North Carolina.

After serving the constitutional limit of three one-year terms, Swain was named president of the University of North Carolina in 1835; he held this post for 33 years and promoted the growth of the institution.

During the American Civil War, Swain was drawn back into North Carolina politics; he represented the state at an 1861 Confederate convention, but declined a position in the Confederate Senate in 1863. In 1865, Swain helped negotiate the surrender of Raleigh to the forces of General William Sherman, and, following the end of the war, advised U.S. president Andrew Johnson on Reconstruction policies.

Although Swain had attempted, facing serious challenges, to keep the University of North Carolina open during the course of the war, by 1868, the school was suffering financially, and, at the request of a new board of trustees appointed by the state legislature, he resigned. On August 11, 1868, he was thrown from a buggy pulled by a horse that General Sherman had given him. Though confined to bed due to shock and weakness, Swain appeared to be recovering, but he succumbed to his injuries on August 27. He was buried in the garden of his home in Chapel Hill, but was later reinterred in the Historic Oakwood Cemetery in Raleigh, N.C.

== Legacy ==
- Swain County, formed in 1871, was named in his honor.

Political offices
Preceded by Montfort Stokes	Governor of North Carolina; 1832–1835	Succeeded by Richard D. Spaight Jr.
