= SS Montfort Stokes =

World War II Liberty ship of the United States

History

United States
- Name: Montfort Stokes
- Namesake: Montfort Stokes
- Builder: North Carolina Shipbuilding Company, Wilmington, North Carolina
- Yard number: 184
- Way number: 7
- Laid down: 16 July 1943
- Launched: 14 August 1943
- Fate: Sold, 1947; Scrapped, 1962

General characteristics
- Type: Liberty ship
- Tonnage: 7,000 long tons deadweight (DWT)
- Length: 441 ft 6 in (134.57 m)
- Beam: 56 ft 11 in (17.35 m)
- Draft: 27 ft 9 in (8.46 m)
- Propulsion: Two oil-fired boilers; Triple expansion steam engine; Single screw; 2,500 hp (1,864 kW)
- Speed: 11 knots (20 km/h; 13 mph)
- Capacity: 9,140 tons cargo
- Complement: 41
- Armament: 1 × Stern-mounted 4 in (100 mm) deck gun; AA guns

SS Montfort Stokes (MC contract 2000) was a Liberty ship built in the United States during World War II. She was named after Montfort Stokes, an American politician who served as both North Carolina's Governor and Senator.

The ship was laid down on 16 July 1943 by the North Carolina Shipbuilding Company of Wilmington, North Carolina, then launched on 14 August 1943. The ship survived the war and was sold into private ownership in 1947. She was scrapped in 1962.
