= John Cameron (British Army officer, born 1773) =

British Army general (1773–1844)

Lieutenant-General Sir John Cameron KCB
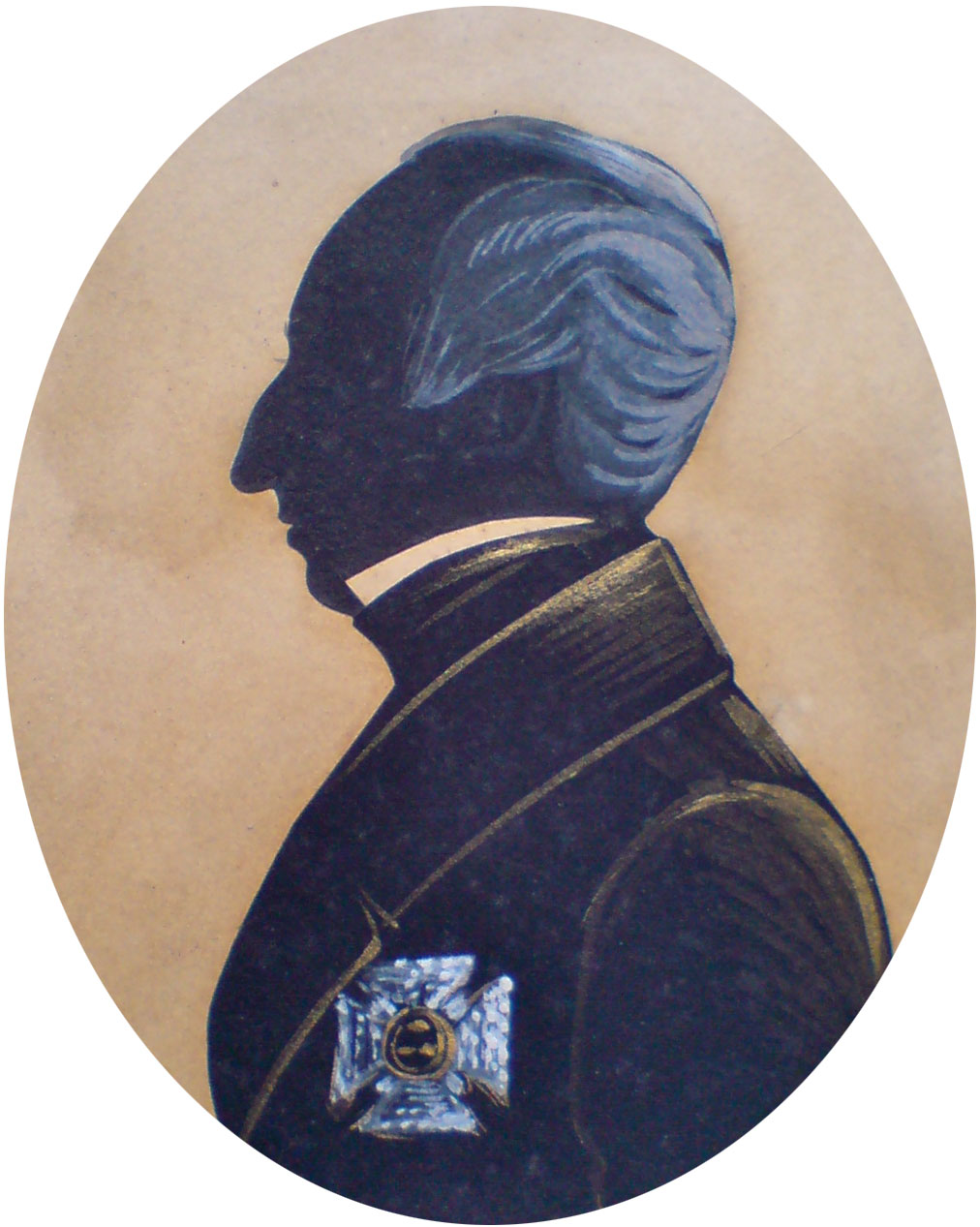
- Lieutenant-General Sir John Cameron, KCB
- Born: 3 January 1773; Culchenna, Inverness, Scotland
- Died: 23 November 1844 (aged 71); Guernsey, Channel Islands
- Relatives: General Sir Duncan Alexander Cameron (son); Lieutenant-General John Cameron (son)
- Military career
- Allegiance: United Kingdom
- Branch: British Army
- Service years: 1787–1844
- Rank: Lieutenant-General
- Commands: Western District; 43rd Regiment of Foot
- Conflicts: War of the First Coalition; Invasion of Guadeloupe; Peninsular War
- Awards: Knights Commander of the Order of the Bath; Knight of the Military Order of the Tower and Sword (Portugal)

Lieutenant-General Sir John Cameron, KCB (3 January 1773 – 23 November 1844) was a British Army officer and commander during the French Revolutionary Wars and the Napoleonic Wars.

== Military career ==
Cameron was commissioned as an ensign on 25 September 1787. He served in the West Indies with the 43rd Regiment of Foot, under Sir Charles Grey, and was present at the siege of Fort Bourbon, the capture of Martinique, St. Lucia and Guadeloupe, and at the assault made by the enemy of Fleur d'épée; he next served under Brigadier-General C. Graham at Berville Camp in Guadeloupe; and commanded the Regiment engaged in the action of 30 September 1794, and in different attacks made by the enemy until 4 October 1794, when he was severely wounded and taken prisoner, in which situation he remained two years (on a prison hull at Pointe-à-Pitre).

He received the Gold Medal for his services at the Battle of Roliça, Battle of Vimeiro, Battle of Corunna, Battle of Bussaco, Battle of Salamanca, Battle of Vitoria, Siege of San Sebastián and Battle of Nive. "In consideration of his eminent services, and we can honestly assert that there was not a better soldier in any army; he was nominated a Knight Commander of the Military Order of the Bath, by his Sovereign. The Portuguese Government conferred the Order of the Tower and the Sword on Sir John for the able services he rendered to that nation."

Promoted to major-general on 19 July 1821, he was appointed a Knight Commander of the Order of the Bath in April 1822. He became Lieutenant-Governor of Plymouth and General Officer Commanding Western District on 25 September 1823. He was also appointed Colonel of the 93rd Regiment of Foot on 23 July 1832 and Colonel of the 9th Regiment of Foot on 31 May 1833.

He was promoted to lieutenant-general on 10 July 1837 and died at Guernsey on 23 November 1844.

== Family ==
Camerons of Culchenna (also spelled Cuilcheanna) are descended from John, second son of Allan of the Forays, who was the XII. Chief of the Clan Cameron. Alternatively, Cameron's ancestry in 1848 was described as "... second son of Culchenna, and nephew of Cameron of Caltort, Inverness-shire, whose ancestor was a younger son of Lochiel, chief of the clan."

Cameron married Amelia Brock, daughter of Henry Brock, Esq., and niece of Admiral James Saumarez, 1st Baron de Saumarez on 10 October 1803, while stationed in Guernsey, Channel Islands. Amelia was a first cousin of Major-General Sir Isaac Brock. The children of Lieut.-Gen. Sir John Cameron and Amelia Brock are:

- Amelia Susannah Brock Cameron (1805–1883)
- Anne Alicia Cameron (7 September 1805 – 13 February 1852), who married the Rev. Henry Curtis Cherry, rector at St Mary's Parish Church in Burghfield, Berkshire and died after giving birth to her 15th issue.
- General Sir Duncan Alexander Cameron (20 May 1808 – 8 June 1888) who fought in the Crimean War, commanded troops during part of the New Zealand Wars and was Governor of Royal Military College, Sandhurst.
- Marion Mount Cameron (29 June 1813 – 8 January 1859), who married the physician Frederick Le Mesurier and had issue.
- Lieutenant-General John Cameron (31 March 1817 – 30 June 1878), who was Director-General of the Ordnance Survey from 1875 to 1878.

Military offices
Preceded by Sir Denis Pack	GOC Western District; 1823–1833	Succeeded by Sir Willoughby Cotton
Preceded by Robert Brownrigg	Colonel of the 9th (East Norfolk) Regiment of Foot; 1833–1844	Succeeded by Sir Thomas Arbuthnot
Preceded by Sir Hudson Lowe	Colonel of the 93rd (Highland) Regiment of Foot; 1832–1833	Succeeded by Sir Jasper Nicolls
