= 1831 Virginia gubernatorial election =

- February 11, 1831
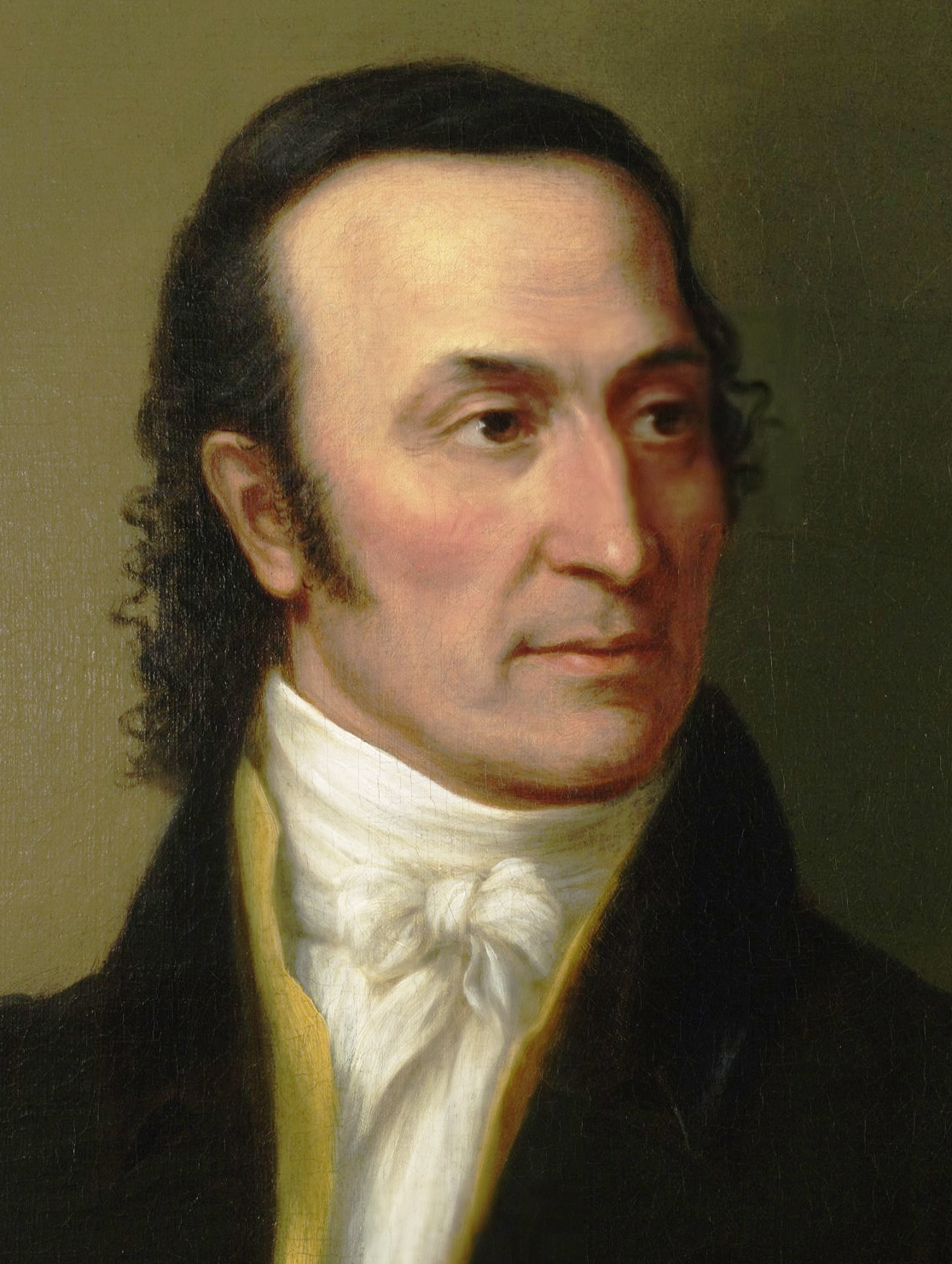
Nominee	John Floyd
Party	Democratic
1st ballot	153
Governor before election
John Floyd
Democratic
Elected Governor
John Floyd
Democratic

A gubernatorial election was held in Virginia on February 11, 1831. The Democratic incumbent governor of Virginia John Floyd was re-elected unanimously.

Floyd belonged to a group of Virginia Old Republicans who were close allies of the vice president of the United States John C. Calhoun. When Calhoun did not run in the 1828 United States presidential election, Floyd campaigned for Andrew Jackson and hoped for an appointment in Jackson's administration. Calhoun's falling out with Jackson during 1830–31 preceded Floyd's exit from the Virginia Democratic Party. In a letter to John Williams dated December 27, 1830, Floyd described his rift with Jackson as irreparable and vowed to win re-election. His campaign became intertwined with the efforts to organize an opposition party in the state from among the supporters of Calhoun and Henry Clay.

The election was conducted by the Virginia General Assembly in joint session. Thomas W. Gilmer nominated Floyd in a speech that paid tribute to the incumbent's statesmanship and republican principles. No other candidates were nominated. Floyd was elected unanimously on the first ballot.

== General election ==
1831 Virginia gubernatorial election
Party	Candidate	First ballot	
Party	Candidate	Count	Percent
Democratic	John Floyd (incumbent)	153	100.00
Total		153	100.00

== Bibliography ==
- Ambler, Charles H. (1918). The Life and Diary of John Floyd [...]. Richmond: Richmond Press.
- Dent, Lynwood Miller (1974). The Virginia Democratic Party, 1824-1847. (Volumes I and II) (PhD thesis). [Baton Rouge]: Louisiana State University.
- Simms, Henry H. (1929). The Rise of the Whigs in Virginia, 1824–1840. Richmond: William Byrd Press.
- Sobel, Robert; Raimo, John (1978). Biographical Directory of the Governors of the United States 1789–1978. Vol. 4. Westport, CT: Meckler Books.
- Virginia (1830). Journal of the House of Delegates [...]. Richmond.
