= Duncan Cameron (British Army officer) =

British Army general (1808–1888)

General Sir Duncan Cameron GCB
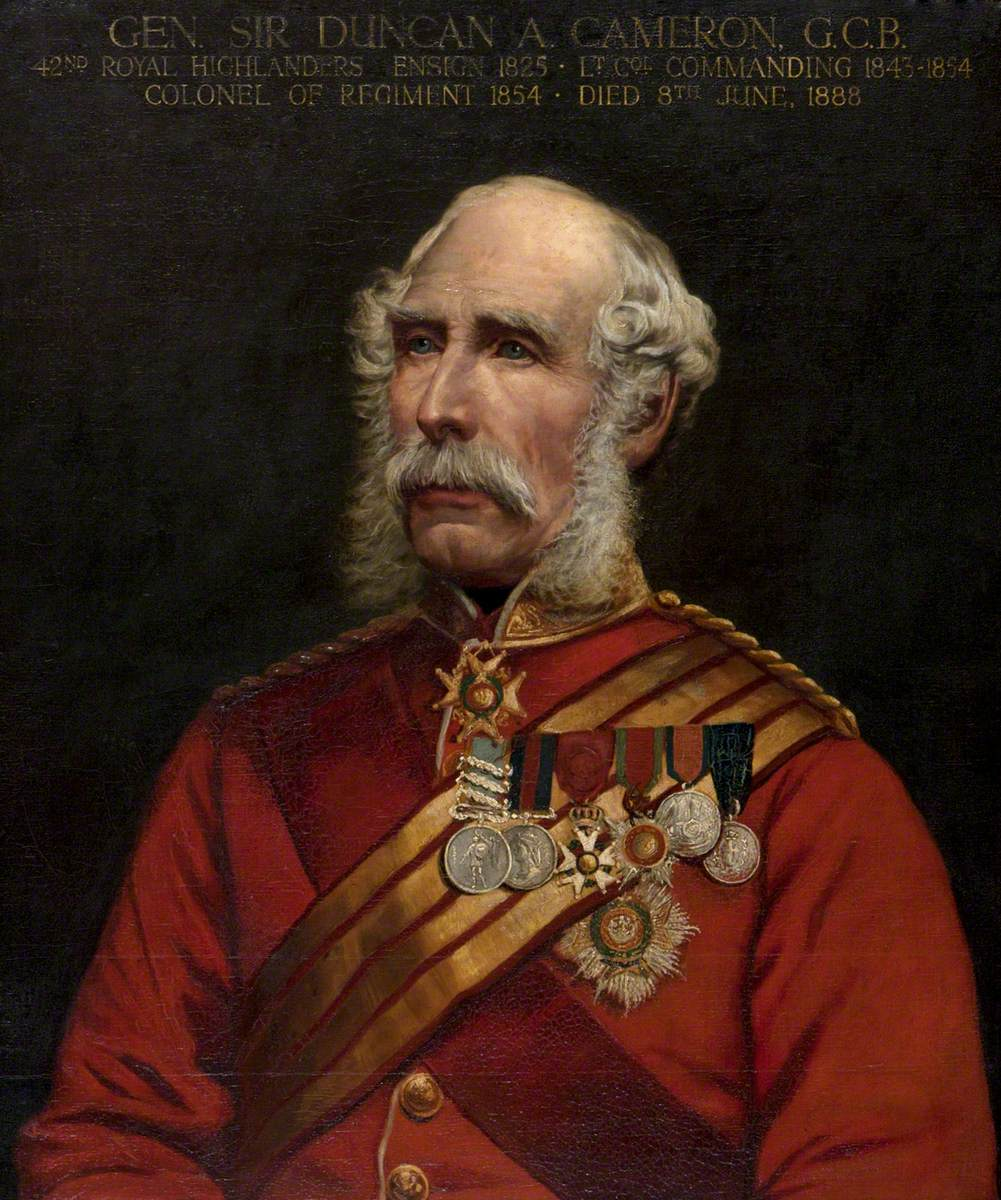
- Born: 20 May 1808; Thorncliffe, Hampshire
- Died: 8 June 1888 (aged 80); Kidbrook, Kent
- Relatives: Lieutenant-General Sir John Cameron (father); Lieutenant-General John Cameron (brother)
- Military career
- Allegiance: United Kingdom
- Branch: British Army
- Service years: 1825–1875
- Rank: General
- Commands: Royal Military College, Sandhurst; British forces in New Zealand; Commander-in-Chief, Scotland; Highland Brigade; 42nd Regiment of Foot
- Conflicts: Crimean War; Battle of Alma; Battle of Balaclava; Siege of Sevastopol; New Zealand Wars; Second Taranaki War; Invasion of the Waikato; Tauranga Campaign
- Awards: Knight Grand Cross of the Order of the Bath; Officer of the Legion of Honour (France); Order of the Medjidie, Third Class (Ottoman Empire)

General Sir Duncan Alexander Cameron, GCB (20 May 1808 – 8 June 1888) was a British Army officer who fought in the Crimean War and part of the New Zealand Wars. He was later a governor of the Royal Military College, Sandhurst.

Born into a family with a military tradition, Cameron joined the British Army in 1825. Commissioned into the 42nd Regiment of Foot, he had risen to the rank of lieutenant-colonel by 1854 and was a battalion commander. He served in the Crimean War and fought in the Battle of Alma. Afterwards, he assumed command of the Highland Brigade and led it through the Battle of Balaclava and the Siege of Sevastopol. He finished the war as a temporary major-general and received several honours for his service. He then held a series of educational and advisory posts with the British Army before becoming Commander-in-Chief, Scotland in 1860.

The following year, Cameron was appointed commander of British forces in New Zealand, which was dealing with the ongoing New Zealand Wars. At the time, the Colonial Government was engaged in a conflict with the Māori in the Taranaki region. However, by the time Cameron arrived in the Taranaki, a truce had been arranged. Two years later, he suppressed a further outbreak of fighting in the area and then led the invasion of the Waikato to deal with the King Movement, a Māori resistance that threatened British sovereignty in the country. He commanded a series of mostly successful engagements with the Kingites, followers of the King Movement, but none were decisive. By March 1864, he had advanced in the Waikato heartland and had pushed the Kingites into the King Country. At Gate Pā in April 1864, his forces suffered a major defeat. By this stage, Cameron was becoming disillusioned with the conduct of the war. Against his wishes, in early 1865 he commanded a campaign against Māori in the southern Taranaki. Coming under political pressure to wage a war he felt was inappropriate, he tendered his resignation and left New Zealand in August 1865.

In 1868, Cameron was made a lieutenant-general and was appointed as governor of the Royal Military College at Sandhurst. He remained in this post until 1875, at which time he retired from military service with the rank of general and as a Knight Grand Cross of the Order of the Bath. He died in 1888 at the age of 80.

== Early life ==
Born on 20 May 1808, Duncan Cameron was a son of Sir John Cameron and Lady Cameron. His mother was from Guernsey and was the niece of Admiral James Saumarez. His father, who retired with the rank of lieutenant-general, was an officer in the British Army who was serving in the Peninsular War and was Scottish. A younger brother, John Cameron, went on to become a lieutenant-general in the British Army, serving in the Royal Engineers. Duncan Cameron most likely was educated at Eton College, as was his father before him.

== Military career ==
Cameron followed his father into the British Army, joining the 42nd Regiment of Foot in April 1825. He was promoted lieutenant the following year, to captain in 1833, to major in 1839, and lieutenant-colonel in 1843, at which time he was commanding a battalion of the regiment on Malta.

On the entry of the United Kingdom into the Crimean War in 1854, the 42nd Regiment was transferred to Turkey as part of the Highland Brigade, 1st Division, with Cameron still a battalion commander. He was soon promoted to colonel and commanded his battalion during the Battle of Alma in September 1854. Shortly afterwards he was appointed commander of the Highland Brigade, and led it through the subsequent Battle of Balaclava and the Siege of Sevastopol. Receiving a promotion to temporary major-general in November 1855, he was the recipient of several awards as a result of his service in the Crimea; appointed a Companion of the Order of the Bath, he was also made an Officer of the Legion of Honour, and received the Order of the Medjidie, Third Class, in 1858.

After the war in Crimea, Cameron became involved in education of British Army personnel. He was appointed to the Council for Army Education in 1857 as its vice president and carried out reforms of both the Royal Military College and the Staff College at Sandhurst. In 1859, he served on the Royal Commission on the Defence of the United Kingdom, whose recommendations prompted a huge programme of fortification for British naval dockyards. The same year his rank of major-general was made substantive. In 1860, he was appointed Commander-in-Chief, Scotland, a position which saw him in command of all British forces in Scotland. By this stage of his career, Cameron was well regarded by his contemporaries.

== New Zealand ==
In January 1861, Cameron was appointed commander of British forces in New Zealand, which at the time was engaged in the First Taranaki War. The war had broken out the previous year over disputed land sales between local Māori and settlers in the Taranaki region. Cameron's appointment was at the behest of the War Office which was dissatisfied with the performance of the incumbent, Major-General Thomas Pratt, whose conduct of the fighting in the Taranaki had been the subject of much criticism. Receiving a temporary promotion to lieutenant-general, Cameron arrived in New Zealand in March 1861 and proceeded to the town of New Plymouth where he informed Pratt that he was being replaced. Although Cameron was keen to deal with the Māori threat in Taranaki, the Governor of New Zealand, Sir Thomas Gore Browne, had negotiated a truce to end the war.

North Island Māori were now becoming increasingly reluctant to sell land and the rise of the King Movement in the Waikato was considered to be a challenge to British sovereignty and the Colonial Government. Kingites, followers of the King Movement, had even supported the Taranaki Māori during the war. Browne, supported by Cameron, began preparing for an invasion of the Waikato. Cameron believed that 2,500 infantry would be sufficient, with a further 1,000 men to secure lines of communication. However, in May 1861, Browne's current term as governor ended and rather than extending it, the Colonial Office in London replaced him with Sir George Grey.

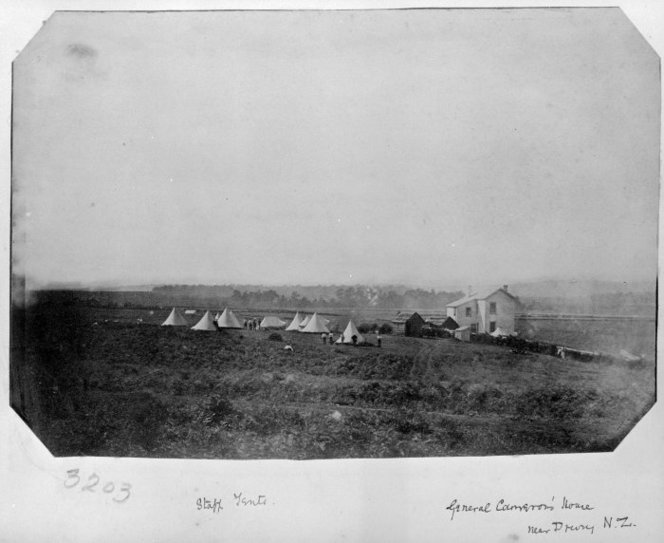
Cameron's house near Drury, Auckland, with staff tents to the left

Grey put an immediate halt to the planned invasion, considering the existing resources inadequate. This was a major disappointment to Cameron who was eager to exercise his command and he soon submitted his resignation. It was declined and Grey encouraged Cameron to stay in his post with the prospect of leading an invasion at a later date. In the meantime, Cameron directed the main efforts of British forces in the continued construction of what is now known as the Great South Road from Drury, south of Auckland, to the Mangatāwhiri Stream, a tributary of the Waikato River that defined the northern Kingite border. This work had commenced during the early stages of preparing for the proposed invasion of Waikato.

=== War in Taranaki ===
After the cessation of hostilities in Taranaki, there was an ongoing dispute over a block of land at Waitara but by April 1863, Grey was preparing to return it to Taranaki Māori. Not knowing of Grey's plans, the following month local Māori ambushed British troops at nearby Ōakura, killing nine soldiers. In retaliation, on 4 June 1863, Cameron led a force of 870 troops on a successful assault on a party of about 50 Māori still occupying the contested Tataraimaka block beside the Katikara River, killing 24.

This fresh outbreak of fighting in Taranaki, known as the Second Taranaki War, gave Grey leverage with the Colonial Office as he used it as justification for a request for an increase in the number of British soldiers in the country. In the meantime, he proceeded with the return of Waitara to the Māori, calming tensions in the Taranaki. Cameron and his forces quickly returned to Auckland where, despite his attack on the Tataraimaka block being a minor action, it was portrayed as a major success. Grey now decided to proceed with an invasion of the Waikato to eliminate the Kingite threat.

=== Invasion of the Waikato ===
Cameron, as a result of his experience in the Crimea, was conscious of the importance of sound logistics to support a military campaign. His preparations for the invasion included the organisation of a transport corps and a telegraph line. Steamers were purchased to form a flotilla that would allow Cameron's forces to be supplied via the Waikato River. On 10 July 1863, he established his headquarters at Queen's Redoubt, near what is now Pōkeno. The invasion began on 12 July 1863 when the British forces, numbering 380 men, crossed the Mangatāwhiri Stream and established a redoubt on the opposite bank. Five days later, Cameron, leading a party of 550 men, attacked Māori warriors entrenching at Koheroa, further south of the Mangatāwhiri Stream. The advancing British soldiers faltered in the face of gunfire from the Māori and Cameron had to personally rally and urge his men forward. The Māori, which the British claimed numbered about 300 but in fact were around 150 men, retreated and escaped, leaving 15 dead. Hailed as a great victory, the British falsely claimed 150 Māori had been killed in the attack for the loss of 12 British soldiers killed or wounded. Cameron was recommended for the Victoria Cross for his role in the attack although it was declined.

However, on the same day as the assault carried out at Koheroa, a Māori party attacked a British convoy moving along the Great South Road, killing several men and capturing a number of carts carrying supplies. Further raids and ambushes were carried out by Kingites behind the British lines for the next several weeks and Cameron, concerned about the threat posed to his supply lines, decided it was not possible to continue his advance into the Waikato. Instead, he had to divert much of his forces into the establishment of a series of outposts along his lines of communication. He did attempt an attack on a camp used by the raiding parties but his approach was detected and he and his men had to withdraw. It was not until late October that Cameron could resume his advance. His initial invasion army of around 4,000 men, had more than doubled with reinforcements from overseas. Even though nearly 6,000 men were still occupied in defending his lines of communication, Cameron was able to mobilise an attack force of nearly 2,000 against his next objective, Meremere. He had also received barges, and the armoured gunboats HMS Avon and Pioneer, and this facilitated movement of his force along the Waikato River.

At Meremere, the Kingites occupied a pā (hillfort) surrounded on three sides by swamp, while the fourth side overlooked the Waikato River and thus it was a barricade to further advance south. Using his river flotilla, on 31 October 1863, Cameron landed 600 troops to the rear of Meremere, with orders to entrench themselves. The flotilla returned to Cameron's advanced base camp for a further 600 men to reinforce those already entrenching. He intended to land to the front of Meremere with the remainder of his force. However, the Kingites, numbering between 1,100 and 1,500 Māori, detected the arrival of the British and simply abandoned the pā at Meremere the next day and slipped away through the swamp. The British were able to simply walk in and seize the pā. Officially, the capture of Meremere was a success but in fact, Cameron saw it as a poor reward for the enforced delay it had caused his advance into the Waikato.

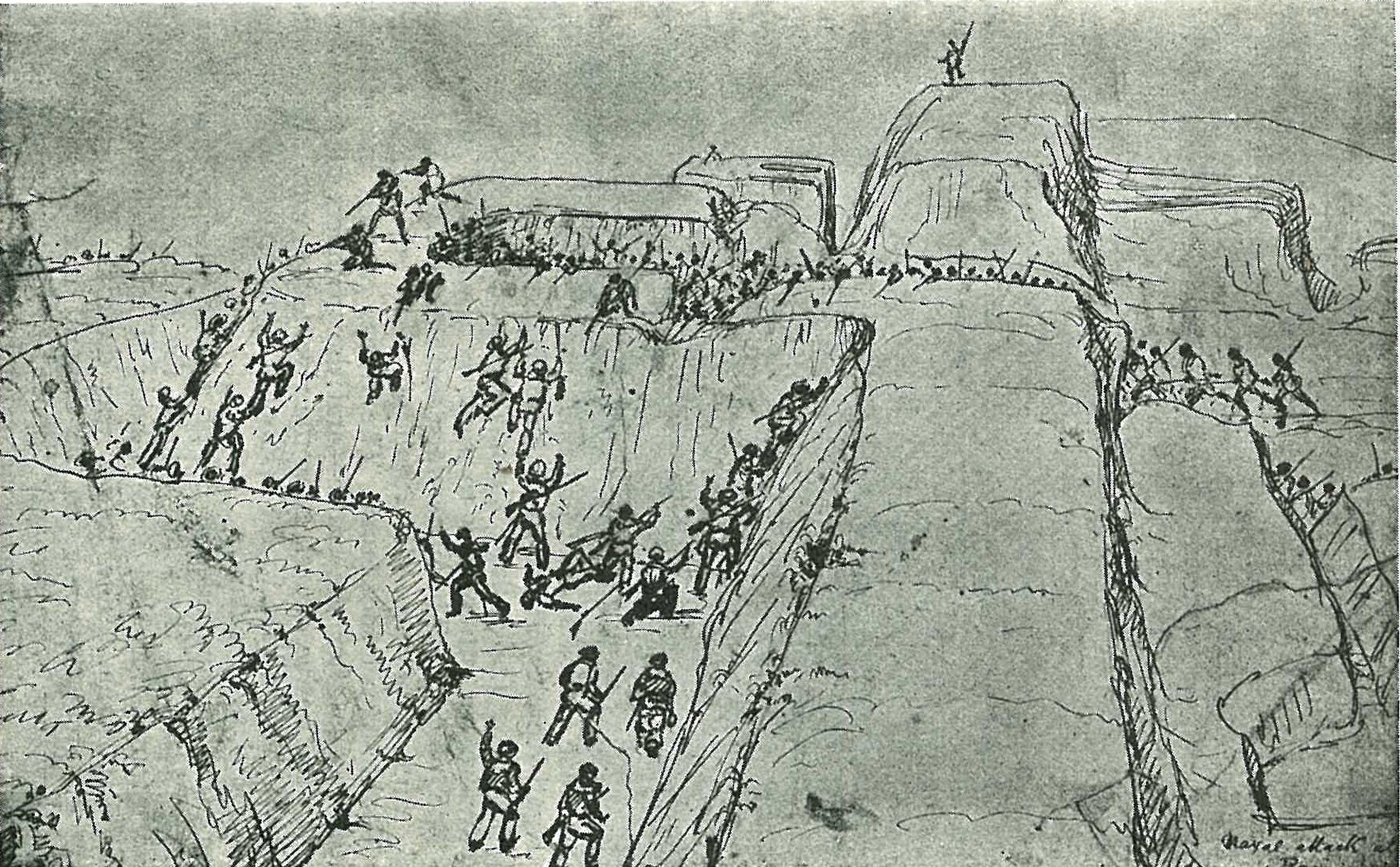
A depiction of the Battle of Rangiriri, 20 November 1863, a pen sketch by Charles Heaphy

The Kingites had established a pā at Rangiriri, overlooking the Waikato River and 13 miles (21 km) upstream from Meremere. The defensive position included not only the pā forming the central redoubt, but also trenches and ramparts extending to the river and 1,000 yards (0.91 km) to nearby Lake Waikare. About 500 Māori were present at Rangiriri although this was insufficient for a proper defence. However, the pā was well engineered, a fact conceded by Cameron after the resulting Battle of Rangiriri. On the afternoon of 20 November, Cameron attacked the front of the Māori position with a force of 900 men on 20 November while 320 men of the 40th Regiment of Foot, supplemented by 200 British Navy personnel, landed to the rear to prevent any retreat. The attack was preceded with an artillery bombardment from the cannon of the gunboats and three 6-pound Armstrong guns and while the defences on the riverside of the central pā was captured, the central redoubt and ramparts to the east, extending to Lake Waikare, were still held by the Māori. Cameron ordered further assaults later in the day but these were all beaten off and the British had to dig in for the evening. During the night, King Tāwhiao, the leader of the King Movement, Wiremu Tamihana and the mortally wounded chief Pene Te Wharepu, along with 200 warriors, were able to escape to the east. At dawn the next day, the remainder of the garrison surrendered to become prisoners. It was later claimed that the white flag hoisted to mark the surrender of the garrison was in fact intended to simply open negotiations but the British soldiers moved into the pā and demanded the weapons of the Māori. Although a victory for Cameron, who was later made a Knight of the Order of the Bath for his success, his forces had incurred losses of 130 men killed or wounded while the Māori suffered around 35 killed with 180 others made prisoner. Some colonists saw this as a poor reward for Rangiriri.

Cameron now led his force further into the Waikato heartland, seizing Ngāruawāhia, the small town at the confluence of the Waikato and Waipā Rivers that was the capital of King Tawhaio, on 8 December and raising the British flag there. The taking of the town was unchallenged; it had been abandoned while tentative terms for an end to the war were offered to, and subsequently rejected by, Grey. Cameron proceeded down the Waipā River, aiming for the valuable farming land around Te Awamutu. By late January 1864, he sighted Māori fortifications at Paterangi; these included four pā. Realising that these would be difficult to seize without significant risk to his force, he decided to bypass the fortifications and draw out its garrison into more favourable terrain for the British. He mounted a nighttime march with 1,200 soldiers on 20 February, getting past the Paterangi defences undetected and moving into a largely unoccupied Te Awamutu at 7:00 am the next day.

Beyond the town, 3 miles (4.8 km) away, was the settlement of Rangiaowhia. Cameron opted to advance against this settlement as well. It was lightly defended, with many women and children present, and 24 Māori were killed or wounded and another 33 taken prisoner. However, the commander of the Colonial Defence Forces, Colonel Marmaduke Nixon, was shot and later died of his wounds. The British then withdrew to Te Awamutu. On 22 February, the Māori garrison at Paterangi moved out with at least 700 heading for Rangiaowhia. Reaching an old pā site at Hairini, on the road to Rangiaowhia, the Māori began entrenching themselves here. Supported with two 6-pound Armstrong guns, Cameron decided to attack before they could complete their defences. His attack was a success, with at least 30, possibly even up to 70 or 80, killed out of around 400, for the loss of just two British soldiers. Paterangi was occupied by the British to deny it to the Māori. Cameron was later criticised for the Rangiaowhia attack; it was not a fighting pā and the Kingites considered the action contrary to established conduct of warfare. There were also accusations that one or more whare to which some had fled during the Rangiaowhia attack had been set on fire with them inside and that one man attempting to surrender was shot. The following day, Cameron led his troops in the sacking of the nearby village of Kihikihi, the home of Rewi Maniapoto, a prominent Māori chief in the King Movement. Like Rangiaowhia, Kihikihi was productive farmland for the Kingites and its loss to the Māori was significant.

In early March, Cameron went to Auckland to consult with Grey and the government for the next steps in the campaign and it was decided to continue with the strategy of depriving the Kingites of supplies. To this end, Cameron, moved most of his army towards Maungatautari leaving a garrison for redoubts being built at Kihikihi, Rangiaowhia, and Te Awamutu, where a strike force of 900 men under Colonel Robert Carey was also based. In the meantime, Maniapoto started construction of a pā at Ōrākau, which was 3 miles (4.8 km) from Kihikihi.

The pā, with its garrison of around 300 Māori, including around 250 warriors, had yet to be completed when British forces attacked on 31 March, having detected its presence the previous day. The initial assaults mounted by Carey's strike force were repelled but were able to surround the pā. This prevented Māori reinforcements, newly arrived from Maungatautari, from entering the pā. Carey, realising an opportunity to inflict a serious blow to the Kingites was possible, requested reinforcements from Cameron, who dispatched 370 soldiers to Ōrākau, now under bombardment while a sap was dug by engineers in order to breach the pā defences. Cameron arrived at the battle site in the morning of 2 April with more reinforcements. Carey was preparing for a further frontal assault but Cameron put a halt to this and issued terms to the defenders of the pā. This was declined despite an invitation from Cameron, impressed with the resiliency of the defenders, to send out the 50-odd women and children present. By now the defenders lacked food, water and ammunition and that afternoon proceeded with a breakout from the southeast corner of the pā. The British lines at this point were thinly held by the 40th Regiment, and the majority of the Māori were able to escape into the surrounding swamp. They were hotly pursued by the British soldiers as well as local militia and numerous Māori were killed, wounded or taken prisoner. In total, around 80 to 150 Māori were killed at Ōrākau for the loss of only 16 British soldiers with a further 53 wounded. However, while most media of the time reported the Battle of Ōrākau as a victory for the British, as did the Kingites, Cameron saw it as a missed opportunity to inflict a decisive victory in the Waikato.

Cameron now returned to Maungatautari, where the Māori had established a defence line of several pā. He moved his forces up to face the Te Tiki o te Ihingarangi pā. It was strongly built and defended; Cameron understood this and chose to simply wait out the defenders rather than engage in a frontal attack. Having exhausted their supplies, it was abandoned by the Māori within a few days, on 5 April. Cameron had intended to move to winter quarters following his move against Maungatautari due to the expected difficulty in maintaining supply lines over the winter months. Accordingly, he withdrew his main force back to Auckland, leaving garrisons in place to secure the key gains of the campaign. The Kingites were now south of the Puniu River, which became a boundary between what became known as the King Country and the territory captured by the British. It would transpire that there would be no further fighting in the Waikato.

=== Tauranga Campaign ===
A local tribe, Ngai-te-Rangi, had begun construction of Gate Pā, close to Camp Te Papa, set up by the British at Tauranga. The camp was established earlier in the year as a means of preventing reinforcements travelling from the East Cape to join up with Waikato Māori and had already been subject to raids by the tribe. The camp commandant requested reinforcements so that an attack could be mounted. Cameron, now back in Auckland with the bulk of his army, realised that with Te Papa being close to a harbour, he was readily able to transport enough manpower and artillery to allow a sufficient concentration for a decisive battle. Seizing his opportunity, he arrived at Te Papa on 21 April 1864 and his attack force followed a few days later.

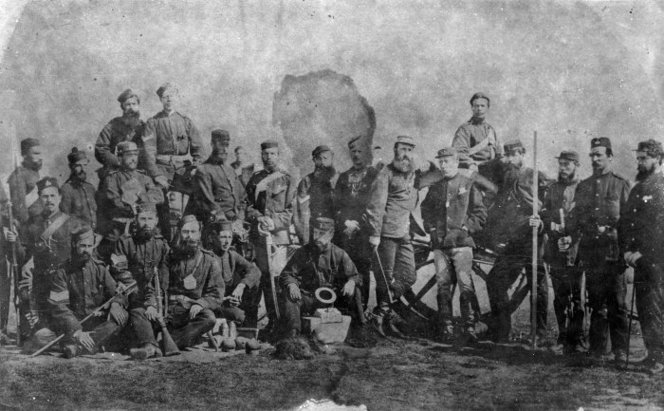
Cameron with a group of soldiers of the Colonial Defence Force on the morning of 29 April 1864, prior to the attack on Gate Pā. Cameron is standing at right, leaning against the centre of the wheel of the gun carriage

On 27 April, Cameron mounted a reconnaissance of Gate Pā and determined that it was formed of two redoubts, garrisoned by about 235 warriors. He moved up his attacking force of about 1,700 men, plus a large artillery train which started bombarding the walls of the Māori position, and the pā was surrounded by the afternoon of 29 April, with a major breach in the walls. He had already sent 730 men of the 68th Regiment of Foot behind the pā to cut off any retreat. He then ordered 300 men of the 43rd Regiment of Foot and marines of the Royal Navy to exploit the breach but the attempt to do so was beaten back with the attacking soldiers engaged in a full scale retreat. On seeing the attacking force fleeing the battle, Cameron attempted to rally them but was unable to do so and retreated to his tent to brood.

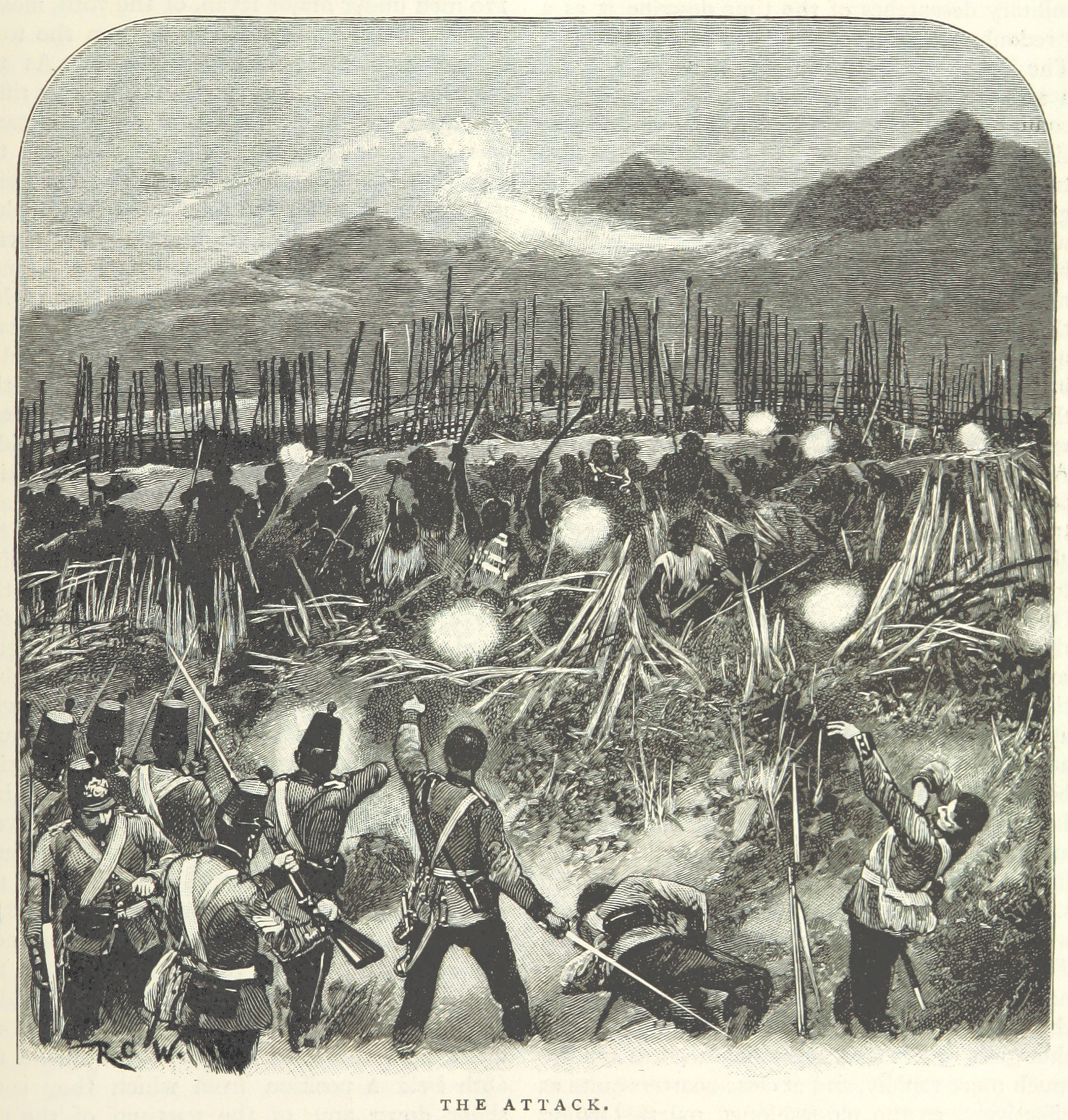
A depiction of the British attack at Gate Pā, 29 April 1864

Although the pā was abandoned overnight, the garrison was able to slip away practically unmolested. With losses of over 100 killed and wounded, the Battle of Gate Pā was a major defeat for Cameron. Already criticised for his overly cautious approach to the campaign in the Waikato, Cameron's conduct of the battle came under question. He struggled to explain the poor performance of the troops making the attack, but noted the losses among the officers may have affected the rank and file. In fact, the attackers had been deceived by a lack of defensive fire from the pā and once drawn in, were set upon by well-concealed warriors.

Cameron met with Grey on 12 May and shortly afterwards decided to cease offensive engagements in Tauranga. He returned to Auckland with the bulk of his forces, citing unfavourable weather as an excuse. He left the local commander, Lieutenant-Colonel H. Greer, with instructions to maintain a defensive posture while Grey, stunned at the outcome of the battle, negotiated terms with Ngai-te-Rangi for an end to hostilities in the area. Within a few weeks, Greer, while conducting defensive patrols in accordance with Cameron's directives, inflicted a defeat on a large force of Māori attempting to establish defensive positions at Te Ranga, 4 miles (6.4 km) from Te Papa. The majority of the Ngai-te-Rangi tribe surrendered shortly afterwards on relatively favourable terms, thus ending the fighting in Tauranga. This prompted the Colonial Government to urge Cameron to resume his offensive operations but he declined to do so, disillusioned about the prospects of a successful outcome to a military campaign. Although the British did not destroy the King Movement, the defeats at Te Ranga and Orakau effectively ended the fighting in the Waikato and the tribes there would eventually cede their land to the colonial government.

=== Return to Taranaki ===
As the Tauranga Campaign wound down, fighting flared up again in the Taranaki and in the Wanganui. Both Grey and the colonial government, considering this a further attempt at Māori independence, wanted to suppress this latest outbreak. At this time, the British forces were beginning the process of withdrawing from New Zealand, transferring responsibility for the colony's internal security to its own military. This added impetus to the colonial government's need to take action in the Taranaki while British soldiers were still available.

With reservations, Cameron agreed to mount a campaign in the Wanganui. However, he saw this conflict as unnecessary, and nothing more than a desire by the Colonial Government for more Māori land and believed that British soldiers should not be used to achieve this. Furthermore, he considered that he would need at least two years to achieve success and reinforcements for his existing army would be required. He commenced the campaign on 24 January 1865, moving with 1,200 soldiers from Wanganui 15 miles (24 km) northward across southern Taranaki to Nukumaru. Here, his force resisted attacks from a large force of over 400 Māori warriors. After two days, having killed 14 soldiers for the loss of 23 warriors, the Māori withdrew. They moved to a robust pā at Weraroa, expecting Cameron to come after them. Despite urging from Grey to do so, he refused, fully aware of the futility of frontal attacks on pā. Instead, he moved further north leaving a garrison and a series of redoubts facing the Weraroa pā. On 13 March, he encountered a force of 200 warriors from the Ngati Ruanui tribe and soundly beat them on open ground at Te Ngaio. At the end of March, he reached the Waingongoro River and halted his advance there, 60 miles (97 km) from Wanganui.

By now relations between Cameron and Grey had broken down over the former's refusal to attack the Weraroa pā. There were already tensions between the two as a result of Cameron's reports to the War Office often being at odds with Grey's own sometimes deliberately misleading communications to London. Cameron's campaign was heavily criticised by colonists as being slow, but this opinion lacked awareness of the need to ensure the security of his lines of communication along his advance. Even the Māori were contemptuous, apparently giving him the nickname The Lame Seagull for the pace of his advance. Cameron, having already resigned his command on 7 February 1865, left for Auckland in April and departed the country on 1 August 1865.

== Later life ==
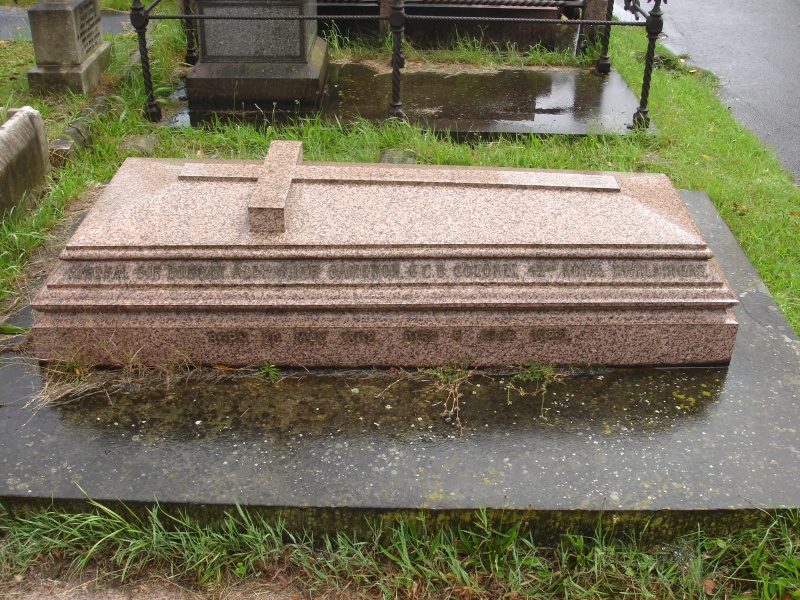
Cameron's funerary monument at Brompton Cemetery, London

After his return to England, Cameron continued to hold his honorary position as regimental colonel of his old unit, the 42nd Regiment of Foot, to which he had been appointed in 1863, only relinquishing it in 1881 when the regiment merged with the 73rd Regiment of Foot to form the Black Watch. He then became regimental colonel of the 1st Battalion of the Black Watch up until his death. In 1868, his temporary rank of lieutenant-general was made substantive, and he was appointed Commissioner "to enquire into the present state of Military Education in this country". The same year, he was appointed as Governor of the Royal Military College at Sandhurst. On 10 September 1873, he married Louisa Flora, the fourth daughter of Andrew Maclean, the deputy inspector-general of the Royal Military College.

As governor at Sandhurst, Cameron attempted various reforms until 1875, at which time he retired from the British Army. Two years previously, he had been promoted to full general and was appointed a Knight Grand Cross of the Order of the Bath. In his later years, he had to deal with published criticism of his conduct of the campaigns in New Zealand. However, these would typically downplay the fighting qualities and tactics of the Kingites. He was also involved in defending himself from a particularly aggrieved dispute with a relative of an officer killed at the Battle of Rangiriri. In his final years, his health deteriorated and he died at Kidbrook, in Kent, on 7 June 1888. Survived only by his wife as the couple had no children, he was buried at Brompton Cemetery in London. The Chapel of the Royal Military Academy includes a memorial to Cameron, which reads:

In Memory of General Sir Duncan Cameron, G.C.B., Colonel of the Black Watch. Died 8 June 1888, aged 80. He served through the Eastern Campaign, 1854–55; commanded the 42nd Regiment at the Alma, and the Highland Brigade at Balaclava. Commanded the Forces in New Zealand during the War of 1863–65. Was Governor of this College, 1868–75.

== Sources ==
- Carlyle, Edward Irving (1901). "Cameron, Duncan Alexander" . In Lee, Sidney (ed.). Dictionary of National Biography (1st supplement). London: Smith, Elder & Co.

Military offices
Preceded by Viscount Melville	Commander-in-Chief, Scotland; 1860–1861	Succeeded by Edward Forestier-Walker
Preceded by Sir George Wetherall	Governor of the Royal Military College, Sandhurst; 1868–1875	Succeeded by William Napier
Honorary titles
Preceded by George Hay, 8th Marquess of Tweeddale	Colonel of the 42nd Regiment of Foot; 1863–1881	Succeeded by Regiment amalgamated to form the Black Watch (Royal Highlanders)
