= James Iredell Jr. =

American politician (1788–1853)

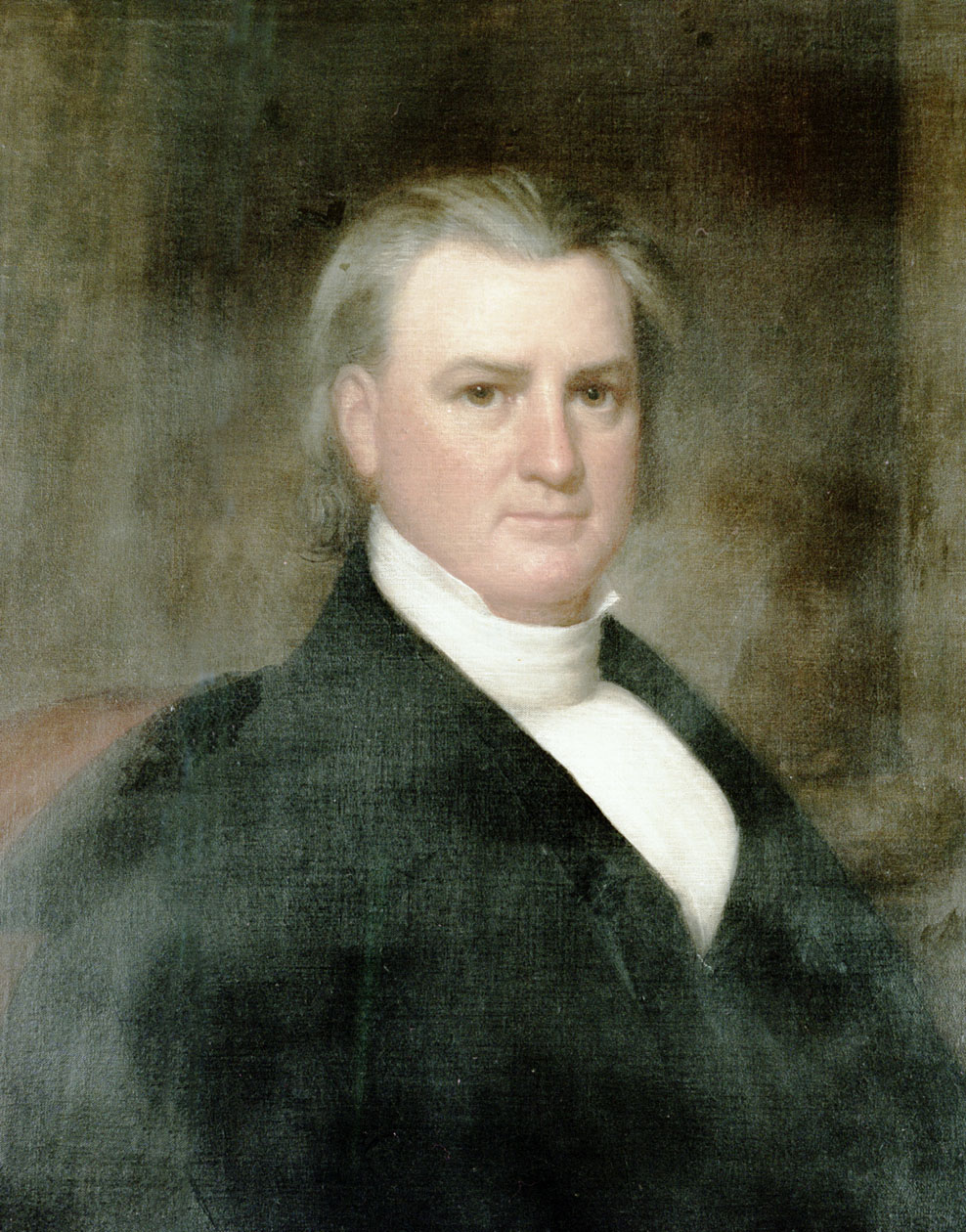

23rd Governor of North Carolina
- In office December 8, 1827 – December 12, 1828
- Preceded by: Hutchins Gordon Burton
- Succeeded by: John Owen

United States Senator from North Carolina
- In office December 15, 1828 – March 4, 1831
- Preceded by: Nathaniel Macon
- Succeeded by: Willie Person Mangum

Personal details
- Born: November 2, 1788 Chowan County, North Carolina, US
- Died: April 13, 1853 (aged 64) Edenton, North Carolina, US
- Party: Democratic (from 1824); Federalist (until 1824)

James Iredell Jr. (November 2, 1788 – April 13, 1853) was the 23rd governor of the U.S. state of North Carolina between 1827 and 1828.

== Early life ==
Iredell was born in Chowan County, North Carolina. He was the son of well-known parents: his father, James Iredell, was a statesman and U.S. Supreme Court justice, and his mother was the sister of former Governor Samuel Johnston. In 1806, young Iredell graduated from the College of New Jersey (today Princeton University).

On his way toward political prominence, Iredell commanded a company of volunteers during the War of 1812, practiced law in Chowan County, served in the state House of Commons, as a representative from Edenton, and was appointed a Superior Court judge.

Iredell kept a diary, which was rare among the North Carolina gentry at that time and provides researchers with a glimpse into the life of that time period.

== Governor and U.S. Senator ==
During his short term as governor, he pushed for better infrastructure and education. Reacting to an interest of the day—horse-drawn railroad carriages—he suggested the construction of a trial railroad from Campbellton to Fayetteville.

He left office after a few months to serve in the U.S. Senate, a post he held from 1828 to 1831. He was completing the term of Nathaniel Macon, who had resigned. By that time, Iredell was a Jacksonian, or member of the Democratic Party. Iredell did not seek to be re-elected by the state General Assembly to a full term in the Senate. He moved to Raleigh, practiced law, and served as court reporter for the North Carolina Supreme Court from 1840 to 1852. He died in Edenton and is buried there in the Johnston Burial Ground.

Political offices
Preceded by Hutchins G. Burton	Governor of North Carolina; 1827–1828	Succeeded by John Owen
U.S. Senate
Preceded by Nathaniel Macon	U.S. senator (Class 3) from North Carolina; 1828–1831; Served alongside: John Branch, Bedford Brown	Succeeded by Willie P. Mangum
