= Jack Cameron =

Jack Cameron may refer to:

- Jack Cameron (actor) (1883–1956), American actor
- Jack Cameron (baseball) (1884–1963), Canadian baseballer
- Jack Cameron (ice hockey) (1900–1981), Canadian ice hockey goaltender
- Jack Cameron (footballer, died 1916), Scottish footballer for Huddersfield Town
- Jack Cameron (footballer, born 1931) (1931–1987), Scottish footballer for Dumbarton and Hartlepools

== See also ==
- John Cameron (disambiguation)
