= John Owen (North Carolina politician) =

American politician (1787–1841)

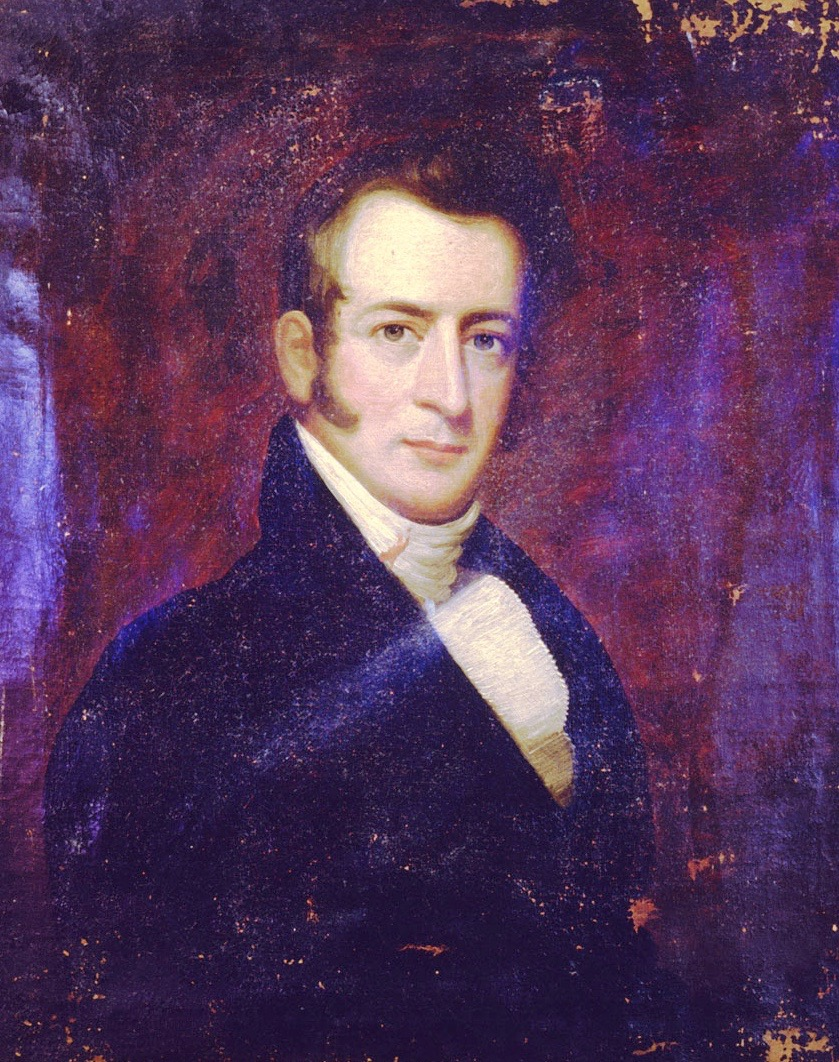
- Painting of John Owen, c. 1829

24th Governor of North Carolina
- In office December 12, 1828 – December 18, 1830
- Preceded by: James Iredell Jr.
- Succeeded by: Montfort Stokes

Member of the North Carolina Senate from Bladen County
- In office 1827–1828
- Preceded by: James J. McKay
- Succeeded by: Malcolm McInnis
- In office November 15, 1819 – December 25, 1820
- Preceded by: James J. McKay
- Succeeded by: Simon Green

Member of the North Carolina House of Commons from Bladen County
- In office November 16, 1812 – December 25, 1813 Serving with David Gillespie
- Preceded by: Thomas Brown; James Owen
- Succeeded by: James J. Cummings; John Sellers

Personal details
- Born: August 21, 1787 Bladen County, North Carolina, U.S.
- Died: October 9, 1841 (aged 54) Pittsboro, North Carolina, U.S.
- Party: Democratic–Republican (before 1828); Democratic; Whig (after 1839)
- Spouse: Lucy Ann Brown
- Children: 5
- Relatives: James Owen (brother)
- Education: University of North Carolina at Chapel Hill

John Owen (August 21, 1787 – October 9, 1841) was the 24th Governor of the U.S. state of North Carolina and the state's first Democratic governor from 1828 to 1830.

== Biography ==
Owen was born in Bladen County, North Carolina; he was the son of Thomas Owen, a judge and member of the state legislature. He briefly attended the University of North Carolina at Chapel Hill, but did not earn a degree.

In 1812, Owen was elected to the North Carolina House of Commons and served there for two years; he was later elected to the North Carolina Senate (1819–1820, 1827–1828). He served on the North Carolina Council of State from 1824 to 1827 under governors Hutchins Gordon Burton and James Iredell Jr. Owen returned to the state senate in 1827 but was elected governor by the General Assembly in December 1828, narrowly defeating Richard Dobbs Spaight Jr. in a vote of 96 to 92.

Owen served two consecutive one-year terms as governor, during which he promoted education and served concurrently as President of the University of North Carolina Board of Trustees. He was nominated for a third term as governor, but declined the nomination; that same year, he lost by one vote (to Willie Mangum) a bid to represent North Carolina in the United States Senate.

In 1831, Omar ibn Said, the slave of John's brother James, wrote:

[...] God brought me into the hands of a good man who fears God and loves to do good deeds; he is called [James] Owen and his brother is called John Owen. Those two are good men. I now live [with them] in a place called Bladen.

Ibn Said further wrote of John's family:

And John Owen's wife is called Louisa, she is a good wife. She gave birth to three [girls] and two boys. Of those children, three died and two lived.

In 1835, Owen was a prominent member of the North Carolina Constitutional Convention; there, he supported enfranchisement of land-owning Negro citizens and opposed religious tests for officeholders.

Although during his earlier political life, Owen affiliated himself with the Democratic Party of Andrew Jackson, in 1839, he presided over the first state convention of the emerging Whig Party; three weeks later, he served as president of the National Whig Convention in Harrisburg, Pennsylvania. Owen was offered the vice-presidential position on the Whig presidential ticket of William Henry Harrison; he turned down the nomination. Had he accepted, Owen might have become President of the United States following Harrison's death early in office instead of John Tyler.

Owen retired to his farm in Chatham County, North Carolina, where he died while in Pittsboro on October 9, 1841 (Raleigh Register and North-Carolina Gazette, Raleigh, NC, October 19, 1841, page 3, column 5); he is buried in the churchyard of St. Bartholomew's Episcopal Church in Pittsboro, North Carolina.

== Sources ==
- Sobel, Robert; Raimo, John, eds. (1978). Biographical Directory of the Governors of the United States, 1789–1978. Westport, CT: Meckler Books. ISBN 0-930466-00-4.

Political offices
Preceded by James Iredell Jr.	Governor of North Carolina; 1828–1830	Succeeded by Montfort Stokes
