= John Cameron (footballer, born 1875) =

Scottish footballer

Personal information
- Full name: John R. Cameron
- Date of birth: 1875
- Place of birth: Currie, Scotland
- Date of death: 1944 (aged 68–69)
- Position: Inside forward

Senior career*
Years	Team	Apps	(Gls)
1896–1897	West Bromwich Albion	13	(2)
1897–1898	Blackburn Rovers	0	(0)
Total		13	(2)
- * Club domestic league appearances and goals

John R. Cameron (1875–1944) was a Scottish footballer who played in the Football League for West Bromwich Albion.
