= Richard Dobbs Spaight =

American Founding Father and politician

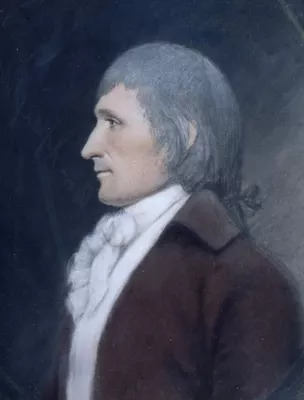
- Portrait by Ellen Sharples, c. 1800–1810.

Member of the U.S. House of Representatives from North Carolina's 10th district
- In office December 10, 1798 – March 3, 1801
- Preceded by: Nathan Bryan
- Succeeded by: John Stanly

8th Governor of North Carolina
- In office December 14, 1792 – November 19, 1795
- Preceded by: Alexander Martin
- Succeeded by: Samuel Ashe

Personal details
- Born: Richard Dobbs Spaight; March 25, 1758 New Bern, North Carolina, British America
- Died: September 6, 1802 (aged 44) New Bern, North Carolina, U.S.
- Party: Federalist (before 1799); Democratic-Republican (1799–1802)
- Spouse: Mary Leech (m. 1788)
- Children: 3, including Richard
- Education: University of Glasgow

Military service
- Allegiance: United States
- Branch/service: North Carolina Militia
- Rank: Major
- Battles/wars: American Revolutionary War • Battle of Camden Court House

Richard Dobbs Spaight (March 25, 1758 – September 6, 1802) was an American Founding Father, politician, planter, and signer of the United States Constitution, who served as a Democratic-Republican U.S. representative for North Carolina's 10th congressional district from 1798 to 1801. Spaight was the eighth governor of North Carolina from 1792 to 1795. He ran for the North Carolina Senate in 1802, and Federalist U.S. Congressman John Stanly campaigned against him as unworthy. Taking offense, Spaight challenged him to a duel on September 5, 1802, in which Stanly shot and mortally wounded Spaight, who died the following day.

== Biography ==
Spaight was the father of North Carolina Governor Richard Dobbs Spaight Jr. and the grandfather of U.S. Representative Richard Spaight Donnell.

=== Early life ===
Spaight was born in New Bern, North Carolina, the son of the secretary of the Crown in the colony and grand-nephew of North Carolina Governor Arthur Dobbs. Orphaned at the age of eight, he was sent to live with his Dobbs relatives at Carrickfergus in Northern Ireland and later followed his cousin Richard Dobbs to the University of Glasgow. During the American Revolutionary War Spaight returned to North Carolina, serving as aide-de-camp to Major General Richard Caswell at the Battle of Camden.

=== Political career ===
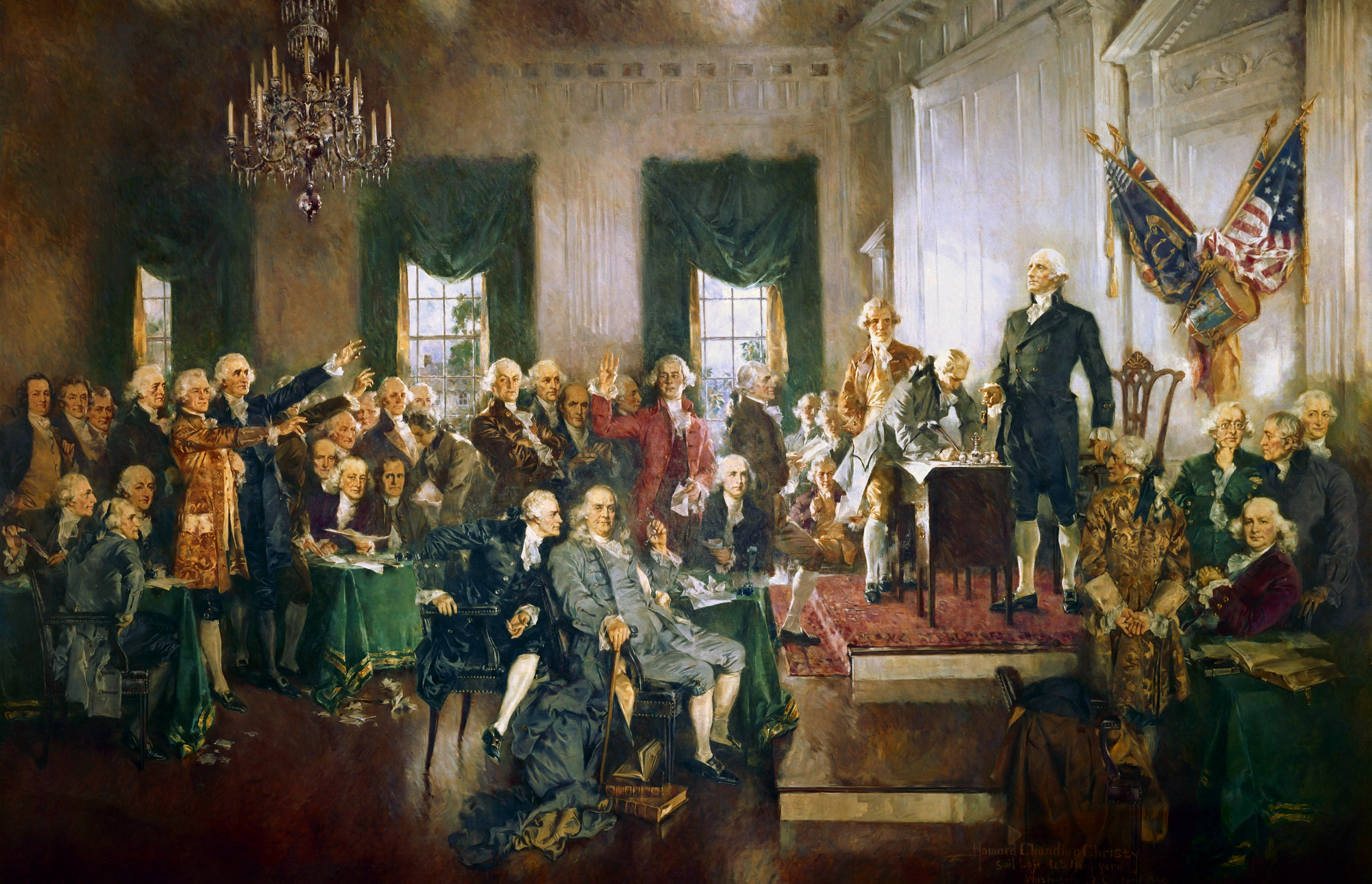
Scene at the Signing of the Constitution of the United States

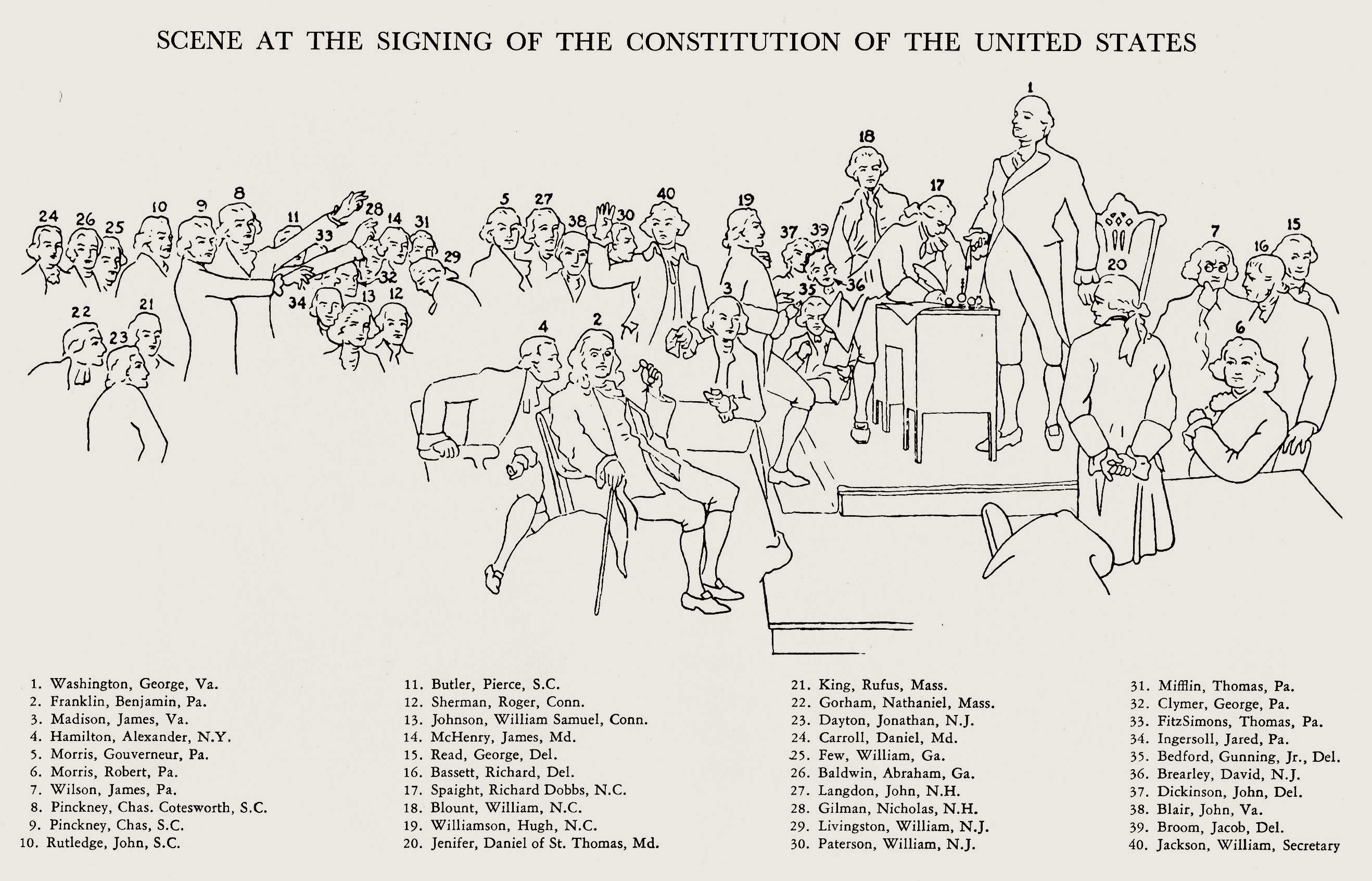
Richard Dobbs Spaight, No. 17.

The North Carolina General Assembly elected Spaight a delegate to the Congress of the Confederation between 1782 and 1785; he then served in the North Carolina House of Commons from 1785 to 1787 and was named speaker of the House. In 1787, he was a delegate to the Philadelphia Convention that drafted the U.S. Constitution, and he signed the document when he was 29 years old.

Under the North Carolina Constitution of 1776, Spaight was nominated for governor in 1787 but was defeated by a majority in the General Assembly; he was nominated for the United States Senate in 1789 and was again defeated. In 1788, he was a member of the state convention, which voted not to ratify the Constitution, although Spaight supported ratification. On March 24, 1788, he married Mary Leach, who had the distinction of being the first lady to dance with George Washington at a ball in Washington's honor at the Governor's Palace, New Bern, in 1791.

Spaight retired from politics for several years because of ill health; he returned to the state House of Representatives in 1792. Also, in 1792, he was elected the first native-born governor of North Carolina and was re-elected by the General Assembly for two further one-year terms. During his term as governor, sites were chosen for the new state capital of Raleigh and the newly chartered University of North Carolina. Spaight was chair of the university's board of trustees during his term as governor. He stepped down as governor in 1795, having served the constitutional limit of three one-year terms.

Spaight was elected to the United States House of Representatives in 1798, filling the unexpired term of Nathan Bryan, whom Spaight previously lost to in 1796; he was elected to a two-year term in 1799, serving until 1801, and though elected as a Federalist, his views on states rights led him to become associated with the Democratic-Republican Party of Thomas Jefferson. He lost his bid for re-election to Congress but returned to state government, serving in the North Carolina Senate beginning in 1801.

=== Slavery ===
Spaight was part of the planter class and an extensive enslaver. According to census records, he enslaved 71 people in 1790 and 83 people in 1800. At the time of his death in 1802, he was enslaving 89 people. As a delegate to the Confederation Congress, Spaight led the successful effort to eliminate Thomas Jefferson's proposed ban on slavery from the Northwest Ordinance of 1784.

=== Death and legacy ===
Spaight died on September 6, 1802, following injuries sustained in a duel with John Stanly, the Federalist congressman who had defeated him in the election of 1800 for the House of Representatives. Spaight is buried at "Clermont," near New Bern, North Carolina. Spaight Street in Madison, Wisconsin, is named in his honor. Most of the main streets in downtown Madison are named after signers of the United States Constitution.

Coat of arms of Richard Dobbs Spaight
| Crest A dove Escutcheon Argent, on a fess Gules 3 pheons |

Spaight appears in John Trumbull's 1824 painting General George Washington Resigning His Commission, which was featured on the reverse of the United States five-thousand-dollar bill.

== Bibliography ==
- Sobel, Robert; Raimo, John, eds. (1978). Biographical Directory of the Governors of the United States, 1789-1978, Volume III: Montana-Pennsylvania. Westport, CT: Meckler Books. OCLC 3204818.
- Watson, Alan D. (1987). Richard Dobbs Spaight. New Bern, North Carolina: Griffin & Tilghman. OCLC 17445571.
- Wheeler, John H. (1880). Sketch of the Life of Richard Dobbs Spaight of North Carolina. Baltimore: William K. Boyle. OCLC 4724626 – via Internet Archive.

Political offices
| Preceded by Alexander Martin | Governor of North Carolina; 1792–1795 | Succeeded by Samuel Ashe |
U.S. House of Representatives
| Preceded by Nathan Bryan | Member of the U.S. House of Representatives from North Carolina's 10th congressional district 1798–1801 | Succeeded by John Stanly |
