= Montfort Stokes =

American politician (1762–1842)

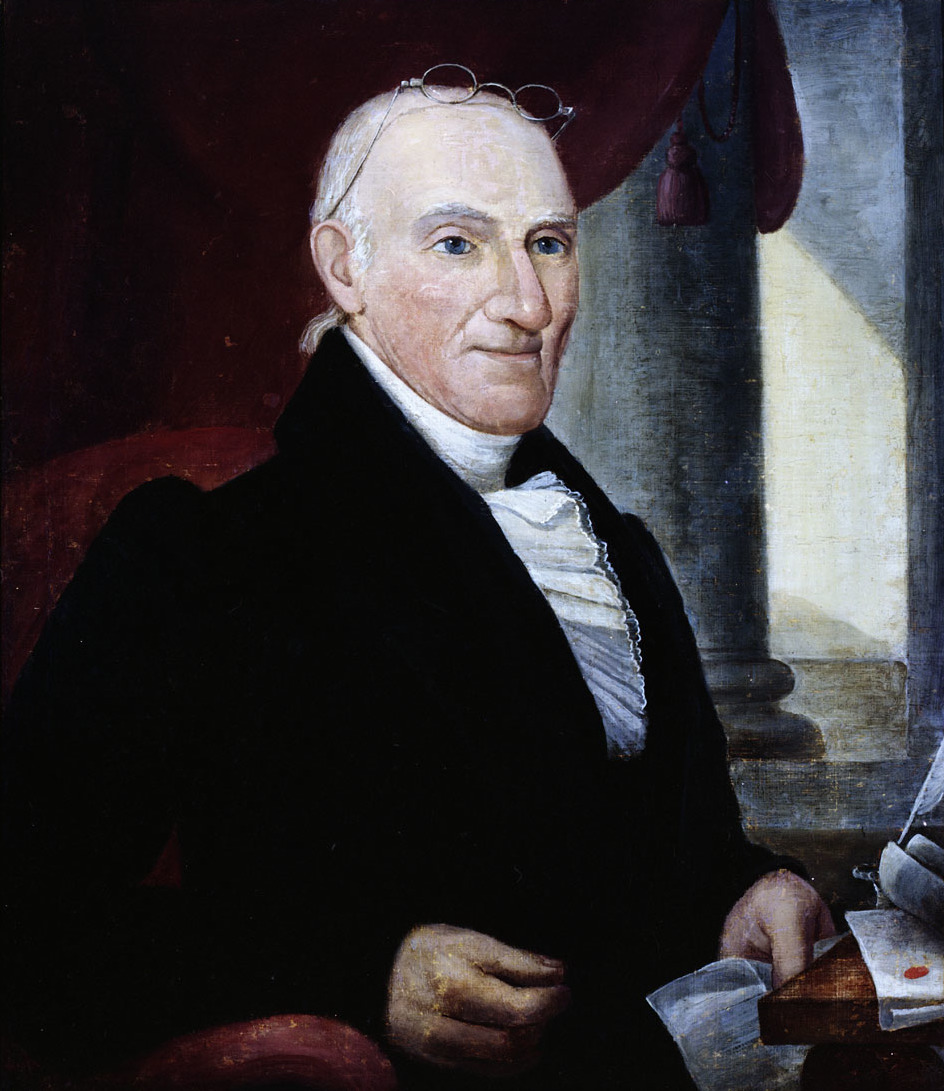

25th Governor of North Carolina
- In office December 18, 1830 – December 6, 1832
- Preceded by: John Owen
- Succeeded by: David Lowry Swain

Member of the North Carolina House of Commons
- In office 1829 – 1830

Member of the North Carolina Senate
- In office 1826 – 1827

United States Senator from North Carolina
- In office December 4, 1816 – March 4, 1823
- Preceded by: James Turner
- Succeeded by: John Branch

Deputy Grand Master of the Grand Lodge of North Carolina
- In office December 12, 1802 – December 16, 1808

Personal details
- Born: March 12, 1762 Lunenburg County, Virginia
- Died: Fort Gibson, Indian Territory
- Party: Democratic-Republican; Democratic
- Spouse(s): Mary Irwin; Rachel Montgomery
- Children: 11

Military service
- Allegiance: United States
- Branch: North Carolina Militia
- Years of service: 1804–1816
- Rank: Major-General
- Wars: War of 1812

Montfort Stokes (March 12, 1762 – November 4, 1842) was an American Democratic (originally Democratic-Republican) politician who served as U.S. Senator from 1816 to 1823, and the 25th governor of North Carolina from 1830 to 1832.

== Biography ==
Born in Lunenburg County, Virginia, Stokes was the youngest of the eleven children of David Stokes, a military officer and judge. At the age of 13, he enlisted in the merchant navy. During the American Revolution, he was captured by the British and confined for seven months on the prison ship Jersey in New York Harbor. He also served as a major-general of North Carolina Militia from 1804 to 1816.

After the Revolutionary War, Stokes settled in Salisbury, North Carolina, farmed, served as clerk of court, and studied law. There, he first met Andrew Jackson, a fellow lawyer. He served as assistant clerk in the North Carolina Senate from 1786 to 1790, was a U.S. House candidate in 1793, and as clerk from 1799 to 1816, until he was elected to the United States Senate following the resignation of James Turner. He served the remaining few months of Turner's term and then a full term in the Senate, but was defeated for re-election by the legislature in 1823. He had previously been elected to the Senate in 1804, but had declined the seat. During his Senate term Stokes changed his residency from Salisbury to Wilkesboro, North Carolina, in the foothills of the Blue Ridge Mountains.

Stokes was then elected to the North Carolina General Assembly; he represented Wilkes County in the North Carolina Senate from 1826 to 1827 and the North Carolina House of Commons from 1829 to 1830.

In 1830, Stokes was elected Governor by the General Assembly on the ninth ballot, defeating Cadwallader Jones and Richard Dobbs Spaight Jr. Stokes faced Spaight for re-election again the following year and was elected by a narrow margin (98–93). During his term in office, Stokes supported construction of canals along the North Carolina Coast; he simultaneously served as president of the University of North Carolina Board of Trustees.

A strong supporter of President Andrew Jackson, Governor Stokes urged the state legislature to support Jackson's anti-nullification position; Stokes was named by Jackson to head the Federal Indian Commission, overseeing relocation and resettlement of Indian tribes from the American southeast, and resigned as governor on November 19, 1832.

With his new position, Stokes moved to Fort Gibson in the Arkansas Territory (present day Oklahoma) and advocated for the Cherokee, Seneca, Shawnee, and Quapaw tribes. He died in November 1842 and is buried near Fort Gibson. Stokes is believed to be the only soldier of the American Revolutionary War buried in Oklahoma.

== Personal life ==
Stokes first married Mary Irwin and they had one daughter. After his wife died, he married Rachel Montgomery (1776–1862) and they had five sons and five daughters. His son, Montfort Sidney Stokes, fought as major in the Mexican–American War and died in 1862 in the Civil War as colonel of the 1st North Carolina Infantry Regiment. Stokes was the uncle of General Joseph Montfort Street, an influential Indian Agent on the Mississippi River.

Stokes was long remembered for a game of brag versus Sergeant-at-Arms of the Senate Mountjoy Bayly that lasted from Thursday afternoon until 10 a.m. the following Monday at which time Bayly had to go back to work, leaving "the Senator grumbling and declaring that had he supposed that Bailey would have thus prematurely broken up the game he would not have sat down to play with him."

== Honors ==
In 1943, a United States Liberty ship named the SS Montfort Stokes was launched. She was scrapped in 1962.

U.S. Senate
Preceded by James Turner	U.S. senator (Class 2) from North Carolina; 1816–1823; Served alongside: Nathaniel Macon	Succeeded by John Branch
Political offices
Preceded by John Owen	Governor of North Carolina; 1830–1832	Succeeded by David Lowry Swain
