= John Cameron (British Army officer, born 1817) =

Lieutenant-General John Cameron CB FRS
- Born: 31 March 1817
- Died: 30 June 1878 (aged 61); Southampton, England
- Burial place: Southampton Old Cemetery
- Relatives: Lieutenant General Sir John Cameron (father); General Sir Duncan Cameron (brother)
- Military career
- Allegiance: United Kingdom
- Branch: British Army
- Rank: Lieutenant-General
- Unit: Royal Engineers
- Awards: Companion of the Order of the Bath

Lieutenant-General John Cameron, CB, FRS (31 March 1817 – 30 June 1878) was a senior British Army officer who served as executive officer and director-general of the Ordnance Survey.

Cameron was son of Lieutenant General Sir John Cameron, and brother to General Sir Duncan Alexander Cameron.

Cameron was awarded the Fellowship of the Royal Society on 4 June 1868.
