= Richard Dobbs Spaight Jr. =

27th governor of North Carolina

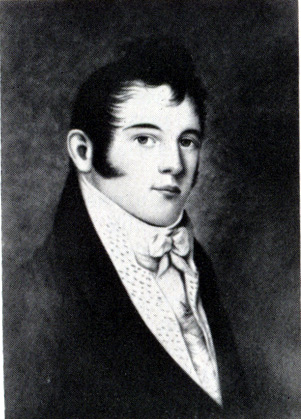

27th Governor of North Carolina
- In office December 10, 1835 – December 31, 1836
- Preceded by: David Lowry Swain
- Succeeded by: Edward Bishop Dudley

Member of the U.S. House of Representatives from North Carolina's 4th district
- In office March 4, 1823 – March 3, 1825
- Preceded by: William S. Blackledge
- Succeeded by: John Heritage Bryan

Member of the North Carolina Senate
- In office 1820–1823

Member of the North Carolina House of Commons
- In office 1819

Personal details
- Born: 1796 New Bern, North Carolina
- Died: November 17, 1850 (aged 53-54) New Bern, North Carolina
- Resting place: "Clermont," near New Bern, North Carolina; 35°04′19.9″N 77°03′17.7″W
- Party: Democratic
- Other political affiliations: Democratic-Republican
- Parent: Richard Dobbs Spaight (father)
- Education: University of North Carolina

Richard Dobbs Spaight Jr. (1796 – November 17, 1850) was an American politician and planter who served as the 27th governor of North Carolina from 1835 to 1836. His father, Richard Dobbs Spaight, served as the eighth governor of North Carolina from 1792 to 1795.

== Biography ==
Born in New Bern, North Carolina, Richard Dobbs Spaight Jr. was the son of Richard Dobbs Spaight. He was orphaned in 1802, when his father was killed in a duel; he later attended the University of North Carolina, graduating in 1815. Spaight studied law and was admitted to the bar in 1818; he was elected to the North Carolina House of Commons in 1819 and the North Carolina Senate in 1820, where he served until being elected to the U.S. House of Representatives in 1823.

Defeated for re-election to Congress, Spaight returned to the state legislature. He made repeated unsuccessful attempts to run for governor, defeated in 1827 (by James Iredell Jr.), 1828 (by John Owen), 1830, 1831 (by Montfort Stokes) and 1832 (by David Swain). Spaight was finally successful in 1835, becoming the last governor elected by the General Assembly under the North Carolina Constitution of 1776. As governor, he opposed state-funded internal improvements. Under the new North Carolina Constitution of 1835, Spaight ran in the first statewide popular election for governor, but was defeated by Edward B. Dudley. The Spaights were the first father and son to serve as governor. W. Kerr Scott and Robert W. Scott later achieved the same distinction. Spaight retired to his farm near New Bern.

== Arms ==
Coat of arms of Richard Dobbs Spaight Jr.
Crest A dove Escutcheon Argent, on a fess Gules 3 pheons

== See also ==
- List of Freemasons

Party political offices
First	Democratic nominee for Governor of North Carolina; 1836	Succeeded by John Branch
U.S. House of Representatives
Preceded by William S. Blackledge	Member of the U.S. House of Representatives from North Carolina's 4th congressional district 1823–1825	Succeeded by John H. Bryan
Political offices
Preceded by David L. Swain	Governor of North Carolina; 1835–1836	Succeeded by Edward B. Dudley
