= North Carolina in the War of 1812 =

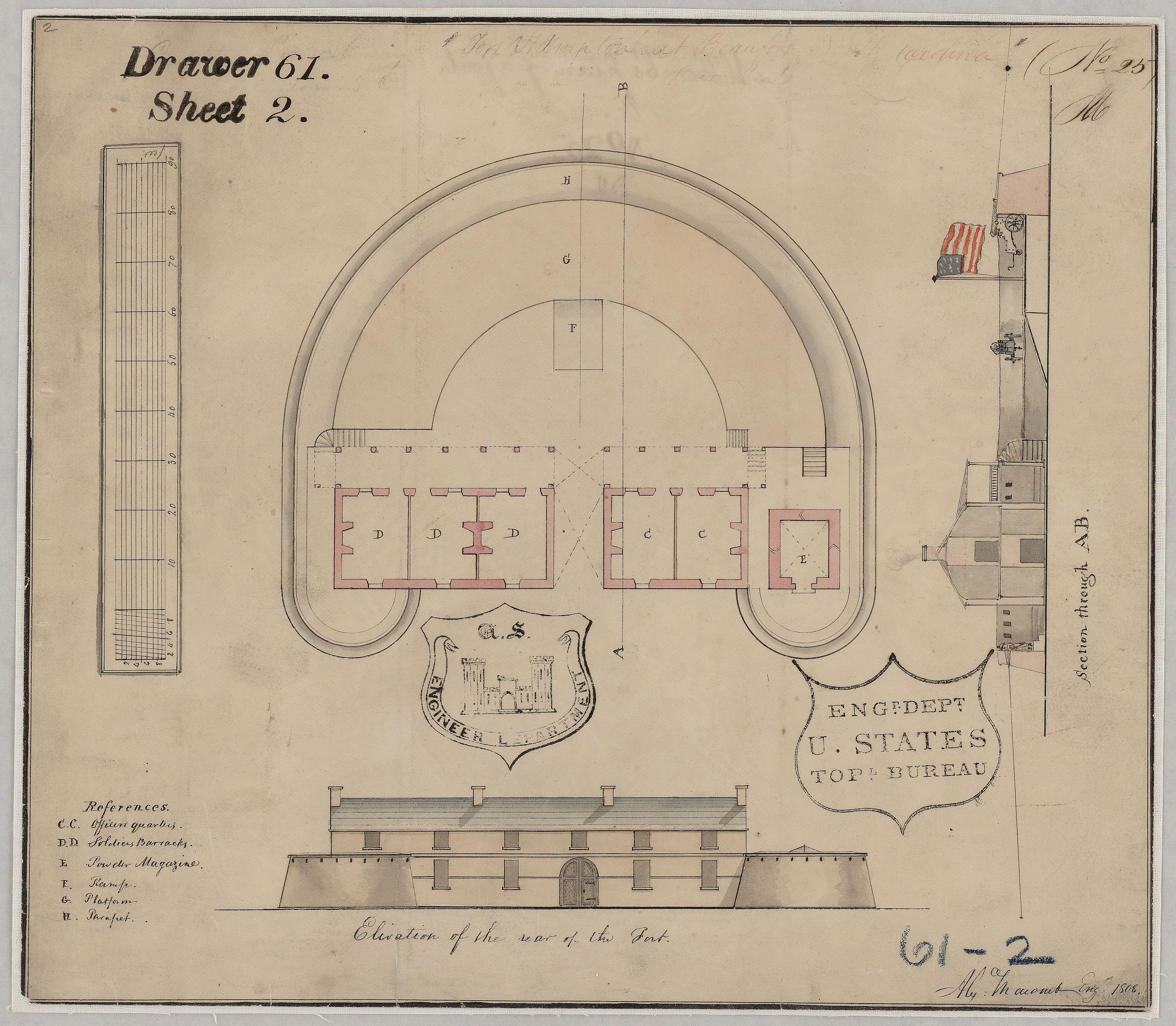
Plan of Fort Hampton at Beaufort.

The War of 1812 occurred during the administration of William Hawkins. France and Great Britain, fighting on the high seas, had been a threat to American peace for a number of years. With the impressment of American seamen, the balance against Great Britain led to a declation of war by Congress on June 18, 1812. The militia was organized in several counties and fortifications along the North Carolina coast were reinforced. With 15,000 men on the militia rolls, Governor Hawkins found no difficulty in furnishing the 7,000 artillerymen, cavalrymen, infantrymen, and riflemen requested by U.S. President James Madison.

== War of 1812 ==
British naval vessels and privateers harassed coastal shipping throughout the War of 1812. As the federal government was unable to spare enough troops or ships to protect the coast, the militia assumed most of the burden for its defense. The British sent landing parties ashore at several places. In November 1813 three barges of armed men from the British privateer Mars captured several American vessels anchored at New Inlet. The British were foiled by the militia, which managed to capture one barge and drive off the others. Governor Hawkins later requested, but failed to receive, federal assistance in building and manning forts to protect the state from another invasion. In another large raid in October 1814, this time against Currituck Inlet, the British captured three ships and burned three more but left as the militiamen arrived.

In the most serious attack against North Carolina during the War of 1812, Portsmouth and Ocracoke Island were occupied in July 1813. A British fleet, consisting of a large warship and assorted smaller craft under Rear-Admiral George Cockburn, reached Ocracoke Inlet about 9:00 p.m. on July 11. In short order, the British seized Portsmouth on the south side of the inlet, Ocracoke on the north side, and Shell Castle in the middle. Although the British captured two privateers, the Anaconda and Atlas, the revenue cutter Mercury outran the enemy ships, reaching New Bern in time to thwart any surprise strike on the mainland. News of the British invasion spread, and militia companies from as far away as Raleigh quickly marched to guard New Bern and other coastal towns. The British remained at Portsmouth and Ocracoke Island until July 16, sailing before the militia companies could reach the coast.
