= List of people executed in North Carolina (pre-1972) =

The following is a list of people executed by the U.S. state of North Carolina before 1972, when capital punishment was briefly abolished by the Supreme Court's ruling in Furman v. Georgia. For execution after the restoration of capital punishment by the Supreme Court's ruling in Gregg v. Georgia (1976), see List of people executed in North Carolina.

== Hanging ==
Slave executions

=== 1789–1799 ===
Name	Race	Age	Sex	Date of execution	County	Crime	Victim(s)	Governor
John Maynard	White		M	November 14, 1791	Chowan	Horse stealing		Alexander Martin
James Smith	White		M	April 23, 1792	Halifax	Horse stealing		Alexander Martin
William Cook	White		M	September 14, 1792	Cumberland	Horse stealing		Alexander Martin
Samuel Fuller	White	30	M	November 2, 1792	Orange	Murder	Male, white (son)	Alexander Martin
Isaac	Black		M	March 25, 1793	Halifax	Murder	Joel Roner, white	Richard Dobbs Spaight
John Edwards	White		M	July 6, 1793	Craven (Federal)	Murder-Mutiny		Richard Dobbs Spaight
Henry McDaniel	White		M	July 6, 1793	Craven (Federal)	Murder-Mutiny		Richard Dobbs Spaight
Philip Maunier	White		M	July 6, 1793	Craven (Federal)	Murder-Mutiny		Richard Dobbs Spaight
Claude Paine	White		M	July 6, 1793	Craven (Federal)	Murder-Mutiny		Richard Dobbs Spaight
William Aldridge	White		M	April 25, 1794	Craven	Murder	Jesse Farmer, white	Richard Dobbs Spaight
Unknown	Black		M	September 1794	Hertford	Attempted poisoning		Richard Dobbs Spaight
Unknown	Black		M	September 5, 1794	Northampton	Murder	Nathaniel Norwood, white (owner)	Richard Dobbs Spaight
Unknown	Black		M	September 5, 1794	Northampton	Murder	Nathaniel Norwood, white (owner)	Richard Dobbs Spaight
Unknown	Black		M	September 5, 1794	Northampton	Murder	Nathaniel Norwood, white (owner)	Richard Dobbs Spaight
Unknown	Black		M	July 2, 1795	New Hanover	Murder	Jacob Lewis, white (overseer)	Richard Dobbs Spaight
Will	Black		M	July 8, 1795	New Hanover	Murder	Jacob Lewis, white (overseer)	Richard Dobbs Spaight
Augustus	Black		M	August 11, 1795	New Hanover	Murder	Jacob Lewis, white (overseer)	Richard Dobbs Spaight
William Briggs	White		M	May 7, 1796	Chowan	Murder	William Ellis, white	Samuel Ashe
William Moore	White		M	May 9, 1797	Cumberland	Murder	William Norcott, white	Samuel Ashe
Phil	Mixed (Note: Mulatto.)		M	April 27, 1798	Wake	Burglary	N/A (Note: Convicted of "robbing the Comptroller's office in the Statehouse of sundry trunks of papers deposited there by order of the General Assembly.")	Samuel Ashe

=== 1800s ===
Name	Race	Age	Sex	Date of execution	County	Crime	Victim(s)	Governor
Elijah T. Dunnavant	White		M	May 17, 1800	Halifax	Slave stealing		Benjamin Williams
Smith	White		M	May 17, 1800	Halifax	Slave stealing		Benjamin Williams
John Rogers	White		M	November 21, 1800	Cumberland	Murder	Male, white (brother-in-law)	Benjamin Williams
Liberty	Black		M	December 19, 1801	Rutherford	Rape		Benjamin Williams
Unknown	Black		M	1802	Chowan	Slave revolt		Benjamin Williams
Unknown	Black		M	1802	Chowan	Slave revolt		Benjamin Williams
Unknown	Black		M	1802	Perquimans	Slave revolt		Benjamin Williams
Unknown	Black		M	1802	Washington	Slave revolt		Benjamin Williams
Unknown	Black		M	1802	Edgecombe	Slave revolt		Benjamin Williams
Unknown	Black		M	May 15, 1802	Camden	Slave revolt		Benjamin Williams
Unknown	Black		M	May 15, 1802	Camden	Slave revolt		Benjamin Williams
Unknown	Black		M	May 15, 1802	Camden	Slave revolt		Benjamin Williams
Unknown	Black		M	May 15, 1802	Camden	Slave revolt		Benjamin Williams
Unknown	Black		M	May 15, 1802	Halifax			Benjamin Williams
Unknown	Black		M	May 15, 1802	Halifax			Benjamin Williams
Unknown	Black		M	May 15, 1802	Halifax			Benjamin Williams
Unknown	Black		M	May 15, 1802	Halifax			Benjamin Williams
Unknown	Black		M	May 15, 1802	Halifax			Benjamin Williams
Unknown	Black		M	May 19, 1802	Currituck	Slave revolt		Benjamin Williams
Unknown	Black		M	May 19, 1802	Currituck	Slave revolt		Benjamin Williams
Frank	Black		M	June 1802	Hertford	Slave revolt		Benjamin Williams
Unknown	Black		M	June 1802	Martin	Slave revolt		Benjamin Williams
Unknown	Black		M	June 1802	Martin	Slave revolt		Benjamin Williams
Bob	Black		M	June 11, 1802	Bertie	Slave revolt		Benjamin Williams
Dave	Black		M	June 11, 1802	Bertie	Slave revolt		Benjamin Williams
Frank	Black		M	June 11, 1802	Bertie	Slave revolt		Benjamin Williams
Unknown	Black		M	June 11, 1802	Bertie	Slave revolt		Benjamin Williams
Unknown	Black		M	June 11, 1802	Bertie	Slave revolt		Benjamin Williams
Unknown	Black		M	June 11, 1802	Bertie	Slave revolt		Benjamin Williams
Unknown	Black		M	June 11, 1802	Bertie	Slave revolt		Benjamin Williams
Unknown	Black		M	June 11, 1802	Bertie	Slave revolt		Benjamin Williams
Unknown	Black		M	June 11, 1802	Bertie	Slave revolt		Benjamin Williams
Unknown	Black		M	June 11, 1802	Bertie	Slave revolt		Benjamin Williams
Unknown	Black		M	June 11, 1802	Bertie	Slave revolt		Benjamin Williams
Sam	Black		M	June 27, 1802	Halifax	Slave revolt		Benjamin Williams
Jim	Black		M	September 10, 1802	Wake	Rape	Female, white	Benjamin Williams
Moses	Black		M	December 8, 1802	Anson	Murder	Male, white (owner)	James Turner
Pete	Black		M	January 1803	Gates	Murder	Male, white	James Turner
John Sloan	White		M	May 3, 1805	Orange	Horse stealing		James Turner
Unknown	Black		F	July 13, 1805 (Note: Executed by burning.)	Wayne	Murder	Several people, white	James Turner
Unknown	Black		M	July 17, 1805	Wayne	Murder	Several people, white	James Turner
Unknown	Black		M	July 17, 1805	Wayne	Murder	Several people, white	James Turner
Unknown	Black		M	July 17, 1805	Wayne	Murder	Several people, white	James Turner
Micajah Johnson	White		M	1806	Cumberland	Kidnapping (Note: Took a free black child and sold him in Virginia as a slave.)	Male, black	Nathaniel Alexander
Unknown	Black		F	March 26, 1806	Sampson	Murder	Female, black	Nathaniel Alexander
Cavenaugh Newport	White		M	January 6, 1809	Anson	Horse stealing		David Stone

=== 1810s ===
Name	Race	Age	Sex	Date of execution	County	Crime	Victim(s)	Governor
William Simons	White	25	M	October 12, 1810	Pasquotank	Murder	Thomas Sherlock, white	David Stone
Lewis Belch	White		M	November 9, 1810	Bertie	Horse stealing	(Note: Executed for stealing a horse worth $30.)	David Stone
Anthony Wiggins	Black		M	November 9, 1810	Bertie	Murder	James Hayes, white	David Stone
Edward Tinker	White		M	September 27, 1811	Carteret	Murder	Mr. Edwards, white	Benjamin Smith
Brister	Black		M	February 28, 1812	Wake	Murder	Christopher Robertson, white (owner)	William Hawkins
Jim	Black		M	July 23, 1816	Person	Murder	Henry A. Jones, white (owner)	William Miller
Riley Fitzpatrick	White		M	September 10, 1816 (Note: Pardoned, but messenger failed to arrive before execution.)		Horse stealing		William Miller
William Neel	White		M	December 13, 1816	Mecklenburg (Note: Change of venue from Lincoln County.)	Murder		John Branch
Abram Hendricks	White		M	May 1, 1818	Rowan	Slave stealing and horse stealing		John Branch
Brayboy	Mixed		M	May 22, 1818	Cumberland	Murder	Male, mixed (Note: Both mulattoes.)	John Branch
Benjamin Gray	White		M	May 22, 1818	Cumberland	Burglary		John Branch
General Dawson	White		M	May 22, 1818	Washington (Note: Change of venue from Bertie County.)	Murder	Male, 8 or 9, white (son)	John Branch
Unknown	Black		M	May 29, 1818	Pasquotank	Murder	Male, white	John Branch
Unknown	Black		M	May 29, 1818	Franklin	Rape		John Branch
David Jernigan	White		M	April 23, 1819	Wayne	Slave stealing		John Branch

=== 1820s ===
Name	Race	Age	Sex	Date of execution	County	Crime	Victim(s)	Governor
William Sparrow	White	47	M	May 12, 1820	Orange	Murder	John Hunt, white	John Branch
Mason Scott	White	19	M	November 10, 1820	Wake	Murder	Caleb, black	John Branch
Jim Smith	Black		M	May 24, 1822	Craven			Gabriel Holmes
William Porter	White		M	May 31, 1822	New Hanover	Burglary		Gabriel Holmes
John Sampson	Black		M	June 14, 1822	Cumberland	Murder	Burwell Rouse, white	Gabriel Holmes
Darby	Black		M	July 16, 1822	Cabarrus	Rape	Female, 12 or 13, white	Gabriel Holmes
William Bowser	Black		M	November 16, 1822	Pasquotank	Burglary		Gabriel Holmes
Charles	Black		M	September 26, 1823	Tyrrell	Murder	Mary Wynne, white	Gabriel Holmes
Jack	Black		M	September 26, 1823	Tyrrell	Murder	Mary Wynne, white	Gabriel Holmes
Lavinia	Black		F	September 26, 1823	Tyrrell	Murder	Mary Wynne, white	Gabriel Holmes
John Skinner	White		M	April 23, 1824	Washington	Murder	Samuel Skinner, white (brother)	Gabriel Holmes
Lemuel Lewis	White		M	May 7, 1824	Wake	Murder	Hinton Pugh, white	Gabriel Holmes
George	Black		M	June 28, 1824	Perquimans	Murder	Jesse Hassell, elderly, white	Gabriel Holmes
Jim	Black		M	November 12, 1824	Gates	Murder	Elisha Cross, white	Gabriel Holmes
Jim	Black		M	November 27, 1824	Beaufort	Rape	Female, white	Gabriel Holmes
Oliver Lewis	White		M	June 25, 1825	Warren (Note: Change of venue.)	Murder	Hinton Pugh, white	Hutchins Gordon Burton
Manuel Antoine	White		M	May 12, 1826	Craven	Murder	William Johnson, white	Hutchins Gordon Burton
Daniel Rash	White	27	M	September 29, 1826	Surry	Murder	Male, white (uncle)	Hutchins Gordon Burton
Dick	Black		M	December 9, 1826	Sampson	Rape		Hutchins Gordon Burton
Ned	Black		M	April 13, 1827	Wake	Murder	Male, white (owner)	Hutchins Gordon Burton
Joseph Sollis	White		M	April 27, 1827	Duplin	Murder	Abraham Kornegay, white	Hutchins Gordon Burton
Mac	Black		M	May 4, 1827	Franklin	Murder	Unknown, black	Hutchins Gordon Burton
Scott	Black		M	May 19, 1827	Orange	Murder		Hutchins Gordon Burton
Nat	Black	23	M	November 2, 1827	Robeson	Arson	Mrs. Murchison, white (Note: Also murdered the victim.)	Hutchins Gordon Burton
J. W. Grant	White		M	December 7, 1827	Caswell	Murder	Mrs. Karborough and Mrs. Wilkinson, white (wives)	Hutchins Gordon Burton
James Selvyn	Black		M	May 23, 1828	Pasquotank	Burglary		James Iredell Jr.
Joe	Black		M	June 20, 1828	Cabarrus	Murder	Mrs. George Long, white	James Iredell Jr.
Molly	Black		F	June 20, 1828	Cabarrus	Murder	Mrs. George Long, white	James Iredell Jr.
Joseph Weir	White		M	June 20, 1828	Cabarrus	Slave stealing		James Iredell Jr.
March	Black		M	September 26, 1828	Tyrrell (Note: Change of venue from Currituck County.)	Murder	Joseph J. Lindsay, white	James Iredell Jr.
Jesse Upton	White		M	November 7, 1828	Guilford	Murder	Female, white (wife)	James Iredell Jr.
Absalom	Black		M	April 24, 1829	Chatham	Murder	Alexander Clark, white	John Owen
John Chittam	White		M	June 17, 1829	Currituck			John Owen
Sam	Black		M	July 3, 1829	Mecklenburg	Burglary		John Owen
James Mitchell	Black		M	December 4, 1829	Halifax	Murder	Female, 4, black (stepdaughter) (Note: Also confessed to murdering his wife, the girl's mother.)	John Owen

=== 1830s ===
Name	Race	Age	Sex	Date of execution	County	Crime	Victim(s)	Governor
David	Black		M	January 8, 1830	Montgomery	Murder	John Chisholm, white	John Owen
Elijah Kimbrough	White		M	November 5, 1830	Wake	Murder	John Davis, white	John Owen
Carey	Black		M	November 5, 1830	Wake	Burglary		John Owen
Henry	Black		M	June 3, 1831	Beaufort			Montfort Stokes
Jesse Eason	White		M	June 3, 1831	Camden	Murder	Frederick Gregory, white	Montfort Stokes
Bob	Black		M	June 17, 1831	Cumberland	Murder	Joshua Edwards, white (owner)	Montfort Stokes
Pompey	Black		M	September 8, 1831	Sampson	Slave revolt		Montfort Stokes
Pizzaro	Black		M	September 8, 1831	Sampson	Slave revolt		Montfort Stokes
Unknown	Black		M	September 8, 1831	Sampson	Rape	Female, 11 or 12, white	Montfort Stokes
Unknown	Black		M	September 19, 1831	New Hanover	Slave revolt		Montfort Stokes
Unknown	Black		M	September 19, 1831	New Hanover	Slave revolt		Montfort Stokes
Unknown	Black		M	September 19, 1831	New Hanover	Slave revolt		Montfort Stokes
Unknown	Black		M	September 19, 1831	New Hanover	Slave revolt		Montfort Stokes
Unknown	Black		M	September 23, 1831	Onslow	Slave revolt		Montfort Stokes
Unknown	Black		M	September 23, 1831	Onslow	Slave revolt		Montfort Stokes
Unknown	Black		M	September 23, 1831	Onslow	Slave revolt		Montfort Stokes
Unknown	Black		M	October 5, 1831	Richmond	Slave revolt		Montfort Stokes
Sam	Black		M	November 4, 1831	Rowan	Rape	Livinia Swink, white	Montfort Stokes
Adam	Black		M	November 12, 1831	New Hanover	Slave revolt		Montfort Stokes
Billy	Black		M	November 12, 1831	New Hanover	Slave revolt		Montfort Stokes
Billy Mitchell	Black		M	November 12, 1831	New Hanover	Slave revolt		Montfort Stokes
Caesar	Black		M	November 12, 1831	New Hanover	Slave revolt		Montfort Stokes
Gummer	Black		M	November 12, 1831	New Hanover	Slave revolt		Montfort Stokes
Juba	Black		M	November 12, 1831	New Hanover	Slave revolt		Montfort Stokes
Charles	Black		M	May 4, 1832	Rowan	Murder	Unknown, child, white	Montfort Stokes
Daniel	Black		M	May 6, 1832	Rowan	Arson	Moses D. Kilpatrick, white	Montfort Stokes
Amy	Black		F	July 28, 1832	Caswell	Murder	Male, infant, white	Montfort Stokes
Washington	Black		M	April 5, 1833	Granville	Murder	Charles Daniel, white	David Lowry Swain
Charles Stokes	White		M	May 17, 1833	Surry	Burglary	Sarah Lambert, white	David Lowry Swain
Frankie Silver	White	19	F	July 12, 1833	Burke	Murder	Charlie Silver, white (husband)	David Lowry Swain
Washington Taburn	White		M	April 9, 1834	Granville	Horse stealing	(Note: Capitally convicted of horse theft five times previously but avoided execution.)	David Lowry Swain
Elijah Hawkins	Black		M	May 23, 1834	Halifax	Murder	Green Mills, black	David Lowry Swain
Benjamin Seaborn	White	27	M	June 3, 1834	Cumberland (Note: Change of venue from Wake County.)	Arson	Richard Smith, white	David Lowry Swain
Absalom Clark	White		M	1835 (Note: Unspecified date prior to 1836.)	Hyde			David Lowry Swain
William Garner	White		M	May 15, 1835	Warren (Note: Change of venue from Northampton County.)	Murder	Martha Garner, white (wife)	David Lowry Swain
James Henry	White		M	May 29, 1835	Buncombe	Highway robbery	Berry Holcombe, white	David Lowry Swain
James Sneed	White		M	May 29, 1835	Buncombe	Highway robbery	Berry Holcombe, white	David Lowry Swain
William Mowbray	White		M	June 19, 1835	Iredell	Slave stealing		David Lowry Swain
James Adcock	White		M	May 28, 1836	Orange	Burglary	(Note: Stole "some articles of small value.")	Richard Dobbs Spaight Jr.
John Calhoon	White		M	May 28, 1836	Guilford	Murder	Female, white (wife)	Richard Dobbs Spaight Jr.
Henry Harris	Black		M	June 18, 1836	Caswell (Note: Change of venue from Orange County.)	Arson	N/A (Note: Burned the Orange County jail.)	Richard Dobbs Spaight Jr.
Levi Miller	White		M	November 11, 1836	Franklin	Murder	John Whittaker, white	Richard Dobbs Spaight Jr.
Lemuel Turner	White		M	January 6, 1837	Granville	Murder	Capt. Harwell, white	Edward Bishop Dudley
Prince	Black		M	March 17, 1837	Cabarrus	Murder	Male, white (owner)	Edward Bishop Dudley
Henry Swink	White		M	April 21, 1837	Rowan	Murder	Female, white (wife)	Edward Bishop Dudley
Willis Mills	Black		M	June 2, 1837	Halifax	Rape	Martha Melton, white	Edward Bishop Dudley
Juba	Black		M	April 13, 1838	Orange	Rape	Female, white	Edward Bishop Dudley
Jim	Black		M	April 20, 1838	Bertie	Rape	Female, white	Edward Bishop Dudley
Killis	Black		M	May 25, 1838	Beaufort	Murder	Benjamin Eborn, white	Edward Bishop Dudley
Dick	Black		M	June 1, 1838	Rockingham	Murder	William G. Comer, white	Edward Bishop Dudley
Moses	Black		M	June 1, 1838	Rockingham	Murder	William G. Comer, white	Edward Bishop Dudley
Henry	Black		M	June 1, 1838	Rockingham	Murder	William G. Comer, white	Edward Bishop Dudley
Wallace	Black		M	July 20, 1838	Beaufort	Murder	Benjamin Eborn, white	Edward Bishop Dudley
Jesse	Black	13	M	November 23, 1838	Craven	Attempted rape	B. Withrington, white	Edward Bishop Dudley
Pleasant Burnet	White		M	May 17, 1839	Warren	Murder		Edward Bishop Dudley

=== 1840s ===
Name	Race	Age	Sex	Date of execution	County	Crime	Victim(s)	Governor
Thomas Christmas	White		M	May 1, 1840	Warren	Murder	Richard Davis, race unknown	Edward Bishop Dudley
John Hoover	White	58	M	May 15, 1840	Iredell	Murder	Mira, black (slave)	Edward Bishop Dudley
Dick	Black		M	April 16, 1841	Orange	Murder	John Tapp, white (owner)	John Motley Morehead
James Johnson (Note: Cousin of future U.S. president Andrew Johnson.)	White	22	M	May 28, 1841	Wake	Murder	Henry Beasley, white	John Motley Morehead
William Waters	White		M	November 18, 1841	Bladen	Maiming (Note: Victim emasculated or castrated.)	Male, 8, white	John Motley Morehead
E. Phelps	White		M	November 26, 1841	Stokes	Murder	Casper Walser, white	John Motley Morehead
Edmund Butler	Black		M	April 8, 1842	Edgecombe	Burglary	Julia Gatlin, white (Note: Stole a bottle of whiskey.)	John Motley Morehead
William Watson	White	65	M	September 30, 1842	Martin	Murder	Fanny Garrett, white (Note: Serial killer, confessed to also murdering his two wives.)	John Motley Morehead
George	Black		M	May 19, 1843	Wake	Murder		John Motley Morehead
Harriet	Black		F	May 19, 1843	Wake	Murder		John Motley Morehead
James E. Stubbs	White		M	June 9, 1843	Beaufort	Murder	Female, white (wife)	John Motley Morehead
Hampton B. Tilley	White		M	November 3, 1843	Guilford (Note: Change of venue from Stokes County.)	Murder	William Martin, white	John Motley Morehead
Charles	Black	14	M	May 31, 1844	New Hanover	Murder	Adonis, 27, black (brother)	John Motley Morehead
Green	Black		M	April 26, 1844	Orange	Arson		John Motley Morehead
Dick	Black		M	April 26, 1844	Orange	Burglary-Attempted rape		John Motley Morehead
Harry Lane	White		M	October 4, 1844	Edgecombe	Murder	John Bedford, white	John Motley Morehead
Hardy Carroll	White		M	May 2, 1845	Franklin	Burglary	(Note: Stole a pair of suspenders. Previously thrice convicted of horse stealing but avoided execution.)	William Alexander Graham
Jacob Cotton	White		M	October 21, 1845	Davie	Murder	Mary West and Henry Swink, white	William Alexander Graham
Ned	Black		M	December 12, 1845	Rutherford	Murder	Male, white (owner)	William Alexander Graham
Jefferson	Black		M	September 25, 1846	Mecklenburg	Rape		William Alexander Graham
Benjamin Dunkin	White		M	October 9, 1846	Davie	Murder	William W. Pedden, white	William Alexander Graham
John Broughton	White		M	May 21, 1847	New Hanover	Murder-Robbery	Frank DeSilva, white	William Alexander Graham
Thomas Nash	White	24	M	October 8, 1847	Montgomery (Note: Change of venue from Anson County.)	Murder	Patsy Beasley, white	William Alexander Graham
David Valentine	Black		M	November 19, 1847	Guilford	Murder	Mrs. West and her grandson, white	William Alexander Graham
Spencer Reeves	White		M	May 5, 1848	Guilford	Murder		William Alexander Graham
John Barfield	White		M	October 6, 1848	Johnston (Note: Change of venue from unspecified county.)	Murder	Mr. Flowers, white	William Alexander Graham
John Hatch	Black		M	November 17, 1848	Craven	Murder	Ben, black	William Alexander Graham
Newton	Black		M	June 22, 1849	Mecklenburg	Rape		Charles Manly
Margarette	Black		F	May 25, 1849	Caswell	Murder		Charles Manly
Griffin Stewart	Black		M	October 19, 1849	Nash (Note: Change of venue from Edgecombe County.)	Murder	Penny Anderson, white	Charles Manly
Edmund	Black		M	October 26, 1849	Anson	Murder	May Buchanan, white (owner)	Charles Manly
Robert Hildreth	White		M	November 2, 1849	Richmond	Murder-Robbery	William Taylor, white	Charles Manly

=== 1850s ===
Name	Race	Age	Sex	Date of execution	County	Crime	Victim(s)	Governor
Jacob Dove	White		M	June 21, 1850	Rowan	Murder	George Linker, white	Charles Manly
George	Black		M	October 18, 1850	Orange	Rape	Female, white	Charles Manly
Damon	Black		M	June 6, 1851	Cumberland	Murder	Tilghman Hunt, white (owner)	David Settle Reid
John Tlighman	White		M	June 14, 1851	Craven	Murder	Joseph T. Tlighman, white (uncle)	David Settle Reid
David Mason	White		M	May 14, 1852	Buncombe	Murder	Female, white (wife)	David Settle Reid
Samuel Parker Perry	White		M	October 28, 1853	Wake	Murder	Female, white (wife)	David Settle Reid
George P. Lankford	White		M	November 25, 1853	Lincoln	Murder	Female, white (wife)	David Settle Reid
Sylvester Mayho	Black		M	June 5, 1854	Halifax	Murder	Bob Roberts, black	David Settle Reid
Bushrod Harris	White		M	June 9, 1854	Person	Murder	James W. Winfree, white	David Settle Reid
Jonathan Baker	White		M	December 30, 1854	Wayne	Murder	Mr. Edwards, white	Warren Winslow
Jacob Johnson	White		M	1855-1860	Cumberland			Bragg or Ellis
Willis Hester	White		M	May 5, 1855	Chatham	Slave stealing		Thomas Bragg
Alfred W. Noblett	White		M	December 14, 1855	Burke	Murder	John Davis, white	Thomas Bragg
Joseph Williams	White	23	M	January 25, 1856	Person	Murder	Francis Williams, white (father)	Thomas Bragg
Riddick Sewell	White		M	May 9, 1856	Perquimans	Murder-Rape	Female, black	Thomas Bragg
Sol Herring	Black		M	May 16, 1856	Wayne	Murder		Thomas Bragg
Peter Johnson	White		M	June 6, 1856	Guilford	Murder		Thomas Bragg
Reuben Samuels	White		M	June 16, 1856	Madison	Murder	Mr. Southern or Sunthorn, white	Thomas Bragg
Jacob Johnson	White		M	December 26, 1856	Harnett	Murder	Jacob Stewart, white	Thomas Bragg
Guilford	Black		M	March 27, 1857	Pitt	Murder	Mr. Haddock, white (overseer)	Thomas Bragg
Sandy	Black		M	March 27, 1857	Pitt	Murder	Mr. Haddock, white (overseer)	Thomas Bragg
Fanny	Black		F	March 27, 1857	Pitt	Murder	Abner F. Griffin, white (overseer)	Thomas Bragg
Guilford	Black		M	April 17, 1857	Wake	Murder	Mr. Peebles, white	Thomas Bragg
Joe	Black		M	May 8, 1857	Granville	Murder	Louis B. Norwood, white (owner)	Thomas Bragg
Massy	Black		F	May 8, 1857	Granville	Murder	Louis B. Norwood, white (owner)	Thomas Bragg
Daniel McDonald	White		M	June 26, 1857	Bladen	Murder	Neil Ferguson, white	Thomas Bragg
Joe	Black		M	April 30, 1858	Columbus	Murder (Note: Their death warrants were recalled after they were found to be mentally disabled, but Whiteville could not be reached in time due to lacking a telegraph.)	Mrs. David Nealey, white	Thomas Bragg
Unknown	Black		M	April 30, 1858	Columbus	Murder	Mrs. David Nealey, white	Thomas Bragg
Peter	Black		M	May 7, 1858	New Hanover	Murder	Mr. Nixon, white	Thomas Bragg
Scott	Black		M	May 7, 1858	New Hanover	Murder	Bob, black	Thomas Bragg
Bythell Mitchell	White	37	M	May 14, 1858	New Hanover	Murder	James Shaw, white	Thomas Bragg
Aaron	Black	35	M	May 21, 1858	Chowan			Thomas Bragg
Ganz	Black	25	M	May 21, 1858	Chowan			Thomas Bragg
McDaniel	White		M	June 4, 1858	Rockingham	Murder	Female, white	Thomas Bragg
John R. Gregory	White	20	M	December 6, 1858	Halifax	Murder	Patsy, elderly, black	Thomas Bragg
Jim	Black		M	February 11, 1859	Wilson	Murder	Male, white	John Willis Ellis
Unknown	Black		M	April 22, 1859	Duplin	Murder	Mrs. Boyett, white	John Willis Ellis
Unknown	Black		M	April 22, 1859	Duplin	Murder	Mrs. Boyett, white	John Willis Ellis
Samuel Simmons	White		M	May 27, 1859	New Hanover	Murder	Nathan Simmons, white (nephew)	John Willis Ellis
John Starling	White		M	November 4, 1859	Lenoir (Note: Change of venue from Wayne County.)	Murder	Sally Cotten, elderly, white	John Willis Ellis

=== 1860s ===
Executions by firing squad

Name	Race	Age	Sex	Date of execution	County	Crime	Victim(s)	Governor
Tim	Black		M	May 18, 1860	Lenoir	Rape		John Willis Ellis
Robert Williams	White		M	December 7, 1860	Rockingham	Murder	Peggy Alsley, white	John Willis Ellis
Unknown	Black		M	February 23, 1861	Northampton	Murder	Mr. Woodruff, white	John Willis Ellis
Unknown	Black		F	February 23, 1861	Northampton	Murder	Mr. Woodruff, white	John Willis Ellis
Hardy Barnes	White		M	June 21, 1861	Cumberland (Note: Change of venue from Robeson County.)	Murder	Abiah Rhodes, white	John Willis Ellis
Unknown	Black		M	July 18, 1862	Lenoir (Military)	Sedition	N/A	Henry Toole Clark
Unknown	Black		M	July 18, 1862	Lenoir (Military)	Sedition	N/A	Henry Toole Clark
Michael Bryant	White	26	M	January 23, 1863	Lenoir (Military)	Desertion	N/A	Zebulon Baird Vance
Lucien	Black		M	April 10, 1863	Orange	Murder	Isaac H. Strowd, white	Zebulon Baird Vance
Allen	Black		M	April 10, 1863	Orange	Murder	Isaac H. Strowd, white	Zebulon Baird Vance
America	Black		M	April 10, 1863	Orange	Murder	John Lockart, white	Zebulon Baird Vance
Daniel	Black		M	April 10, 1863	Orange	Murder	John Lockart, white	Zebulon Baird Vance
Ezekiel Grooms	White		M	April 16, 1863	Haywood	Murder	Male, white	Zebulon Baird Vance
Joseph Haskett	White		M	April 5, 1864	Lenoir (Military)	Desertion	N/A	Zebulon Baird Vance
David Jones	White		M	April 5, 1864	Lenoir (Military)	Desertion	N/A	Zebulon Baird Vance
Amos Armyett	White		M	April 12, 1864	Lenoir (Military)	Desertion	N/A	Zebulon Baird Vance
Lewis Bryan	White		M	April 12, 1864	Lenoir (Military)	Desertion	N/A	Zebulon Baird Vance
Mitchell Busick	White		M	April 12, 1864	Lenoir (Military)	Desertion	N/A	Zebulon Baird Vance
William Irving	White		M	April 12, 1864	Lenoir (Military)	Desertion	N/A	Zebulon Baird Vance
John Stanly	White		M	April 12, 1864	Lenoir (Military)	Desertion	N/A	Zebulon Baird Vance
A. Brittain	White		M	April 22, 1864	Lenoir (Military)	Desertion	N/A	Zebulon Baird Vance
John Brock	White		M	April 22, 1864	Lenoir (Military)	Desertion	N/A	Zebulon Baird Vance
Joseph Brock	White		M	April 22, 1864	Lenoir (Military)	Desertion	N/A	Zebulon Baird Vance
Charles Cuthrell	White		M	April 22, 1864	Lenoir (Military)	Desertion	N/A	Zebulon Baird Vance
W. Daughtry	White		M	April 22, 1864	Lenoir (Military)	Desertion	N/A	Zebulon Baird Vance
John Freeman	White		M	April 22, 1864	Lenoir (Military)	Desertion	N/A	Zebulon Baird Vance
Lewis Freeman	White		M	April 22, 1864	Lenoir (Military)	Desertion	N/A	Zebulon Baird Vance
William Haddock	White		M	April 22, 1864	Lenoir (Military)	Desertion	N/A	Zebulon Baird Vance
Calvin Huffman	White		M	April 22, 1864	Lenoir (Military)	Desertion	N/A	Zebulon Baird Vance
Stephen Jones	White		M	April 22, 1864	Lenoir (Military)	Desertion	N/A	Zebulon Baird Vance
William Jones	White		M	April 22, 1864	Lenoir (Military)	Desertion	N/A	Zebulon Baird Vance
Jesse Summerlin	White		M	April 22, 1864	Lenoir (Military)	Desertion	N/A	Zebulon Baird Vance
Lewis Taylor	White		M	April 22, 1864	Lenoir (Military)	Desertion	N/A	Zebulon Baird Vance
William Hill	White		M	April 22, 1864	Lenoir (Military)	Desertion	N/A	Zebulon Baird Vance
Elijah Kellum	White		M	April 22, 1864	Lenoir (Military)	Desertion	N/A	Zebulon Baird Vance
James Preble	White	22	M	March 31, 1865	Wayne (Military)	Rape	Letitia Craft, white (Note: Also attempted to rape Rebecca Drake and Louise Bedard.)	Zebulon Baird Vance
Alfred Catlett	Black		M	May 4, 1865	Buncombe (Military)	Rape		Zebulon Baird Vance
Alexander Colwell	Black		M	May 4, 1865	Buncombe (Military)	Rape		Zebulon Baird Vance
Charles Turner	Black		M	May 4, 1865	Buncombe (Military)	Rape		Zebulon Baird Vance
Washington Jackson	Black		M	May 4, 1865	Buncombe (Military)	Rape		Zebulon Baird Vance
Henry Anderson	White	22	M	May 13, 1865	Wayne (Military)	Murder-Robbery	A civilian	Zebulon Baird Vance
James Nixon	Black		M	June 1, 1866	Jones	Burglary	Jacob F. Scott, 45, white	Jonathan Worth
Donaldson Ruffin	Black		M	June 1, 1866	Jones	Burglary	Jacob F. Scott, 45, white	Jonathan Worth
Richard Williams	Black		M	June 1, 1866	Jones	Burglary	Jacob F. Scott, 45, white	Jonathan Worth
Charles Parks	Black		M	June 29, 1866	Mecklenburg	Murder	Female, black (wife)	Jonathan Worth
Henry Queary	Black		M	September 7, 1866	Cabarrus	Rape	Josephine Queary, 28, white	Jonathan Worth
Lewis Williams	Black		M	December 21, 1866	New Hanover	Highway robbery	John Loftin, black (Note: Also suspected of similarly robbing a white man, Benjamin Mills.)	Jonathan Worth
Augustus Williams	Black		M	December 21, 1866	New Hanover	Highway robbery	John Loftin, black	Jonathan Worth
William Johnson	Black		M	April 26, 1867	Chatham	Murder-Robbery	John A. Johnson, 77, white (former owner)	Jonathan Worth
Green Hodges	Black		M	June 14, 1867	Mecklenburg	Rape	Jane Spears, 41, white	Jonathan Worth
John Brinkley	White	30	M	July 12, 1867	Lenoir	Murder-Robbery	Jonathan A. Costin, white	Jonathan Worth
Lewis Albritton	Black		M	August 16, 1867	Craven	Highway robbery	Cicero Green, 39, white (Note: Also the prime suspect in the robbery and arson of the Wood & West Mercantile Company in Kinston.)	Jonathan Worth
Franklin Smith	White		M	August 30, 1867	New Hanover	Rape	Susan Smith, 8, white (foster daughter)	Jonathan Worth
Banvester Haywood	Black		M	September 20, 1867	Craven	Murder	Tellishia Keyes, black	Jonathan Worth
Anderson Marslettur	Black		M	November 29, 1867	Halifax	Murder	Female, black (wife)	Jonathan Worth
Squire Woods	Black		M	January 3, 1868	Rockingham	Murder	Dick Wright, black	Jonathan Worth
Willis Weatherly	Black	20	M	January 3, 1868	Rockingham	Murder	Dick Wright, black	Jonathan Worth
Washington Hicks	Black		M	February 14, 1868	Craven	Highway robbery	Cicero Green, 39, white	Jonathan Worth
Needham Evans	Black		M	February 14, 1868	Pitt	Murder-Burglary	Willis Briley, 56, white	Jonathan Worth
Richard Jackson	Black		M	February 14, 1868	Pitt	Murder-Burglary	Willis Briley, 56, white	Jonathan Worth
William Parker	White	17	M	February 28, 1868	New Hanover	Murder-Robbery	William Childress, white	Jonathan Worth
Jim Knight	Black	43	M	April 3, 1868	Edgecombe	Murder-Robbery	John H. Cutchen, 21, white	Jonathan Worth
John Taylor	Black	32	M	April 3, 1868	Edgecombe	Murder-Robbery	John H. Cutchen, 21, white	Jonathan Worth
Thomas Dula	White	36	M	May 1, 1868	Iredell (Note: Change of venue from Wilkes County.)	Murder	Laura Foster, 23, white	Jonathan Worth
Reuben Wright	White	63	M	May 19, 1868	Stokes	Murder	Silas Hairston, 42, black	Jonathan Worth
George Washington	Black	17	M	May 22, 1868	Lenoir	Arson		Jonathan Worth
Rufus Ludwig	White	21	M	June 27, 1868	Rowan	Murder	Milly Campbell Ludwig, 19, white (wife)	Jonathan Worth
Tom Ryan	Black		M	November 6, 1868	Martin	Murder	James R. Leggett, 33, white	William Woods Holden
Augustus Holmes	Black		M	January 1, 1869	Edgecombe	Murder	Matthew King, black	William Woods Holden
Augustus Baker	Black	26	M	June 4, 1869	Halifax	Murder	Wade Ditcher, black	William Woods Holden
James Thomas	Black		M	June 4, 1869	Halifax	Murder	Wade Ditcher, black	William Woods Holden
John Smith	Black		M	August 6, 1869	Chatham (Note: Change of venue from Orange County.)	Murder	Smith Green, black	William Woods Holden
Benjamin Douglass	Black		M	October 1, 1869	Moore	Murder	Dennis Thomas, black	William Woods Holden

=== 1870s ===
Name	Race	Age	Sex	Date of execution	County	Crime	Victim(s)	Governor
Lewis Hines	Black		M	January 14, 1870	Edgecombe	Rape	Sarah Johnson, 18, white	William Woods Holden
Bob Gunn	Black		M	April 1, 1870	Orange	Murder-Robbery	Reuben Blalock, 29, white	William Woods Holden
Tom Young	Black		M	April 1, 1870	Orange	Murder-Robbery	Reuben Blalock, 29, white	William Woods Holden
Andrew Tarpley	Black	14	M	August 26, 1870	Alamance	Rape	Bettie Loy, 11, white	William Woods Holden
William Stimson	Black		M	November 4, 1870	Wake	Rape-Burglary	Nancy Bunn, 66, white	William Woods Holden
Dumer Harget	Black	31	M	February 3, 1871	Carteret	Murder	Absalom Fisher, black	Tod Robinson Caldwell
Henderson Oxendine	Black	47	M	March 17, 1871	Robeson	Murder	Stephen Davis, 36, white (posse member) (Note: Participant in the Lowry War.)	Tod Robinson Caldwell
Madison Youngblood	Black		M	May 5, 1871	Johnston	Murder-Burglary	Miles Draughton, white	Tod Robinson Caldwell
Ned McLendon	Black		M	June 2, 1871	Richmond	Rape	Sallie L. Usher, 25, white	Tod Robinson Caldwell
Henderson Young	Black		M	July 14, 1871	Mecklenburg	Murder-Burglary	Edward Smith, 45, white	Tod Robinson Caldwell
Ned Myers	Black	54	M	July 21, 1871	Anson	Murder-Robbery	James W. Redfearn, 37, white	Tod Robinson Caldwell
Lewis Coppedge	Black	17	M	July 21, 1871	Anson	Murder-Robbery	James W. Redfearn, 37, white	Tod Robinson Caldwell
Alfred Mackey	Black		M	October 27, 1871	Columbus	Murder-Robbery	John Stancill, 44, white	Tod Robinson Caldwell
William B. Parker	White	50	M	October 27, 1871	Guilford	Murder	Thomas Price, 60, black	Tod Robinson Caldwell
Mack Swann	Black		M	November 3, 1871	Johnston	Rape	Keziah Peeden, 69, white	Tod Robinson Caldwell
Pompey Lyon	Black	31	M	December 15, 1871	Orange	Murder	Baker Tilley, black	Tod Robinson Caldwell
Govan Adair	White	25	M	July 12, 1872	Henderson (Note: Change of venue from Rutherford County.)	Murder	Four people, mixed (Note: Silas Weston (51, mulatto) and his children David (5), Theodosia (6), and William Herbert Steadman (10), an illegitimate child of his wife, a mulatta. The wife and 15-month-old Mary Weston survived the attack. The Adairs were Ku Klux Klan members.)	Tod Robinson Caldwell
Columbus Adair	White	27	M	July 12, 1872	Henderson	Murder	Four people, mixed	Tod Robinson Caldwell
N. V. Chandler	White	26	M	August 9, 1872	Mecklenburg (Note: Change of venue from Gaston County.)	Rape-Burglary	Ms. Bradshaw, 28, white	Tod Robinson Caldwell
Nathaniel Caldwell	Black	30	M	August 23, 1872	Mecklenburg	Murder	Dovey Davidson, <1, mixed (child) (Note: Dovey's mother was a mulatta.)	Tod Robinson Caldwell
York Lattimore	Black	42	M	November 8, 1872	Rutherford	Murder	Samuel Martin, 20, black	Tod Robinson Caldwell
Jerry Thompson	Black	24	M	November 8, 1872	Rutherford	Murder	Samuel Martin, 20, black	Tod Robinson Caldwell
Thomas Johnson	Black	21	M	December 13, 1872	Davidson	Rape	Susan Thompson, 62, white	Tod Robinson Caldwell
Orren Mercer	Black	35	M	January 16, 1873	Edgecombe	Murder	Male, 5 months, black (son)	Tod Robinson Caldwell
George Lea	Black	28	M	May 6, 1873	Caswell	Rape	Ann Kearsey, 74, white	Tod Robinson Caldwell
Bayless Henderson	White	26	M	June 6, 1873	Jackson	Murder-Robbery	Nimrod Simpson Jarrett, 72, white	Tod Robinson Caldwell
Aaron Stroud	Black	16	M	June 30, 1873	Orange	Rape	Martha E. Stroud, 3, white	Tod Robinson Caldwell
Hardy Jones	Black	63	M	August 8, 1873	Craven	Murder	Robert Miller, black (posse member)	Tod Robinson Caldwell
Joseph Baker	White	28	M	January 16, 1874	Mecklenburg	Murder	Newton Wilfong, black	Tod Robinson Caldwell
John Allen Ketchey	White	30	M	June 26, 1874	Rowan	Rape	Millie Bersherer, 17, white	Tod Robinson Caldwell
John Allen Blake	Black	23	M	July 24, 1874	Wake	Rape (Note: The victim "lost her mind" and became "a raving maniac.")	Lucy Haley, 18, white	Curtis Hooks Brogden
George Berry	Black	28	M	October 30, 1874	Columbus	Murder	Cain Cooper, 22, black	Curtis Hooks Brogden
Aaron Bonner	Black		M	March 5, 1875	Beaufort	Rape	Margaret Kipps, 25, white	Curtis Hooks Brogden
George Cunningham	White	19	M	May 27, 1875	Madison (Note: Change of venue from Buncombe County.)	Murder	Daniel Sternberg, white	Curtis Hooks Brogden
Cornelius Williamson	Black	39	M	August 27, 1875	Northampton	Murder-Robbery	Samuel Presson, white	Curtis Hooks Brogden
Lawyer Bryan	Black	17	M	September 3, 1875	Onslow	Murder	Michael T. Langley, 41, white	Curtis Hooks Brogden
William Hall	White		M	October 1, 1875	Buncombe	Murder	Andrew J. Gillespie, white (stepfather-in-law)	Curtis Hooks Brogden
Burwell Newsome	Black	18	M	May 23, 1876	Bertie	Rape	Ellen Outland, 28, white	Curtis Hooks Brogden
Isaac Berry	Black	45	M	June 1, 1876	Caldwell	Murder	Sophie Berry, black (wife)	Curtis Hooks Brogden
William Messimer	White	22	M	December 22, 1876	Iredell (Note: Change of venue from Rowan County.)	Murder	Sarah Heilig, 74, white (mother-in-law)	Curtis Hooks Brogden
Simon Ragland	Black		M	January 22, 1877	Martin	Rape	Cornelia Bidgood, 21, white	Zebulon Baird Vance
Hillman Morgan	Black		M	November 2, 1877	Franklin	Murder	John Crudup, black	Zebulon Baird Vance
Nathan Overton	White	36	M	November 2, 1877	Beaufort (Note: Change of venue from Edgecombe County.)	Murder-Robbery	William Grimes, 25, white	Zebulon Baird Vance
Noah Taylor	Black	34	M	November 2, 1877	Beaufort	Murder-Robbery	William Grimes, 25, white	Zebulon Baird Vance
Hilliard Morgan	Black	35	M	December 21, 1877	Wayne	Burglary	Thomas Yelverton, 65, white	Zebulon Baird Vance
Arden Nelson	Black	22	M	January 18, 1878	Washington	Murder-Burglary	Jehu Webb, 37, white	Zebulon Baird Vance
John Shallington	Black	28	M	April 12, 1878	Greene	Murder	Serena Thompson, 16, black	Zebulon Baird Vance
Henry Roberts	Black	30	M	May 24, 1878	Cleveland	Murder	Gus Ware, black	Zebulon Baird Vance
Harris Atkinson	Black	38	M	June 14, 1878	Wayne	Murder-Rape	James Patrick and Apsilla Jane Snipes Worley, white	Zebulon Baird Vance
Noah Cherry	Black	64	M	June 14, 1878	Wayne	Murder-Rape	James Patrick and Apsilla Jane Snipes Worley, white	Zebulon Baird Vance
Robert Thompson	Black	42	M	June 14, 1878	Wayne	Murder-Rape	James Patrick and Apsilla Jane Snipes Worley, white	Zebulon Baird Vance
James Laxton	Black	45	M	October 25, 1878	Iredell (Note: Change of venue from Caldwell County.)	Rape	Nancy L. Barlow, 17, white	Zebulon Baird Vance
William Rainey	Black		M	November 8, 1878	Warren	Murder-Robbery	James Taylor, 21, black	Zebulon Baird Vance
William Jefferson	Black	31	M	December 6, 1878	Warren	Rape	Amanda Myrick, 36, black (Note: Serial rapist, confessed to eight other rapes, including that of Melissa Darndell (16, black) that same day. Imprisoned at the Virginia State Penitentiary from 1866 to 1871 for an attack near Boydton and later murdered a black man who had begun living with his wife during that time, the murder of whom went undiscovered until his admission.)	Zebulon Baird Vance
John Edwards	White	65	M	February 14, 1879	Johnston	Murder	Kader J. Ballard, 46, white	Thomas Jordan Jarvis
Richard Lee	Black	30	M	May 9, 1879	Cumberland (Note: Change of venue from Bladen County.)	Burglary	John F. Currie, 43, white	Thomas Jordan Jarvis
Henry Andrews	White	29	M	May 16, 1879	Orange	Burglary	Margaret Lydia Johnston Herndon, 40, white (Note: Serial burglars, "terrorized the town for several months.")	Thomas Jordan Jarvis
Louis Carlton	Black	33	M	May 16, 1879	Orange	Burglary	Margaret Lydia Johnston Herndon, 40, white	Thomas Jordan Jarvis
Henry Davis	White	32	M	May 16, 1879	Orange	Burglary	Margaret Lydia Johnston Herndon, 40, white	Thomas Jordan Jarvis
Jesse Davis	Black	41	M	June 13, 1879	Johnston (Note: Change of venue from Franklin County.)	Rape	Margaret Champion, 29, white	Thomas Jordan Jarvis
Edward Foy	Black	20	M	June 20, 1879	Carteret	Rape	Adelia Hanners, 27, white	Thomas Jordan Jarvis
Robert Jones	Black	43	M	June 25, 1879	Edgecombe	Murder	Rudolph Eaton, white	Thomas Jordan Jarvis
John Davis	Black	29	M	July 11, 1879	Brunswick	Murder	Henry McDuffie, black	Thomas Jordan Jarvis
Robert McCorkle	Black	60	M	August 15, 1879	Alexander	Murder	John Wesley Wyckoff, 50, white	Thomas Jordan Jarvis
Thomas Bowman	White		M	August 20, 1879	Randolph	Murder	Thurza Ann Cannon Bowman, white (wife)	Thomas Jordan Jarvis
Robert Boswell	Black		M	October 31, 1879	Orange	Murder	Nancy Blackwell (common-law wife) (Note: Also murdered their two children after setting their house on fire and was involved in the previous poisoning of a black man, Ned Lyon.)	Thomas Jordan Jarvis

=== 1880s ===
Name	Race	Age	Sex	Date of execution	County	Crime	Victim(s)	Governor
Allen Mathis	Black	28	M	January 9, 1880	New Hanover (Note: Change of venue from Pender County.)	Murder	Reuben Herring, 48, black	Thomas Jordan Jarvis
Joe Gillespie	Black	23	M	January 30, 1880	Alexander (Note: Change of venue from Iredell County.)	Murder-Robbery	William G. Fowler, 38, white	Thomas Jordan Jarvis
Henry Horne	Black		M	May 7, 1880	Mecklenburg	Burglary	Daniel H. Byerly, 53, white (Note: Caught when burglarizing the home of Robert M. Oates (51, white) later that night.)	Thomas Jordan Jarvis
Robert Outerbridge	Black		M	June 11, 1880	Bertie	Murder	Peter Freeman, 28, black	Thomas Jordan Jarvis
Alexander Howard	Black	40	M	July 9, 1880	Wayne	Murder-Burglary	Batel Autry, 60, white	Thomas Jordan Jarvis
Stephen Richardson	Black	35	M	September 3, 1880	New Hanover	Murder	Lucy Phinney, 61, black (mother-in-law)	Thomas Jordan Jarvis
Peter Leach	Black	27	M	September 24, 1880	Robeson	Murder	Sam Townsend, black	Thomas Jordan Jarvis
Charles Pearson	Black	23	M	October 22, 1880	Catawba	Murder	Harrison Kinder, 24, black	Thomas Jordan Jarvis
Daniel Keith	White	32	M	December 17, 1880	Rutherford (Note: Change of venue from Cleveland County.)	Murder-Rape	Alice Ellis, 9, black	Thomas Jordan Jarvis
Marshal Baxter	Black	24	M	April 29, 1881	Mecklenburg	Murder	Robert Hennigan, 28, black	Thomas Jordan Jarvis
Allen Johnson	Black	25	M	October 28, 1881	Mecklenburg	Murder-Robbery	"Old Blind Crump", 60+, black	Thomas Jordan Jarvis
Henry Lovett	Black	22	M	November 4, 1881	Columbus	Murder	Argilus P. Williams, 60, black	Thomas Jordan Jarvis
Augustus Smith	Black	20	M	November 18, 1881	Johnston	Rape	Lillian Johnson, 7, white	Thomas Jordan Jarvis
Matilda Carter	Black	22	F	January 13, 1882	Rockingham	Murder	Nash Carter, 40, black (Matilda's husband)	Thomas Jordan Jarvis
Joe Hays	Black	25	M	January 13, 1882	Rockingham	Murder	Nash Carter, 40, black (Matilda's husband)	Thomas Jordan Jarvis
Eldridge Scales	Black	26	M	January 13, 1882	Rockingham	Murder	Nash Carter, 40, black (Matilda's husband)	Thomas Jordan Jarvis
John Morris	Black	28	M	January 27, 1882	Cleveland (Note: Change of venue from Lincoln County.)	Murder	Joseph Roark, black	Thomas Jordan Jarvis
Stephen Efler	White	25	M	May 19, 1882	McDowell	Murder	Margaret Grindstaff Efler, 22, white (wife)	Thomas Jordan Jarvis
Philip Faison	Black	35	M	July 11, 1882	Sampson	Murder	Henry Sillers, 62, black	Thomas Jordan Jarvis
Iverson Slade	Black	25	M	December 29, 1882	Caswell	Murder	Dora White, 20, black (sister-in-law)	Thomas Jordan Jarvis
Jerome Holt	Black	23	M	March 23, 1883	Alamance	Rape	Mrs. William Terrell, 47, white	Thomas Jordan Jarvis
Robert Henderson	Black	20	M	June 1, 1883	Granville	Murder	Frances Henderson, 18, black (wife) (Note: Pregnant when murdered.)	Thomas Jordan Jarvis
Henry Jones	Black	23	M	August 27, 1883	Wake	Murder	Alvis H. Blake, 22, white (sheriff's deputy)	Thomas Jordan Jarvis
Bert Ellis	Black	22	M	December 14, 1883	Cleveland	Murder-Burglary	Lizzie Logan, 53, white (Note: Her 63-year-old husband William was also attacked but survived.)	Thomas Jordan Jarvis
Guilford Soon	Black	40	M	December 20, 1883	Lenoir	Rape-Burglary	Eliza Jones, 48, white	Thomas Jordan Jarvis
Benjamin Gilliam	White	28	M	January 24, 1884	Pamlico	Murder	Henry Carter, 34, black	Thomas Jordan Jarvis
Enoch Brown	Black	38	M	May 2, 1884	Halifax	Murder	Lucy Brown, 40, black (wife)	Thomas Jordan Jarvis
Irving Lang	Black		M	February 23, 1885	Pitt	Murder	Moses Barrett, 41, black	Alfred Moore Scales
Eatons Wells	Black	46	M	July 17, 1885	Halifax	Murder-Robbery	John Henry Ponton, 34, black	Alfred Moore Scales
Joseph O. Howard	White	60+	M	August 7, 1885	Cumberland	Murder-Robbery	Cullen L. Blackman, 44, white	Alfred Moore Scales
Tom Gee	Black		M	August 7, 1885	Cumberland	Murder	Mary Hughes, 50, white	Alfred Moore Scales
Tom McNeil	Black	23	M	August 7, 1885	Cumberland	Murder	Simon McNeil, 33, black (brother)	Alfred Moore Scales
Isaiah Richardson	Black		M	December 7, 1885	Gates	Burglary	N/A (Note: Robbed the Willey & Eggleston store.)	Alfred Moore Scales
Edward Sauders	Black		M	December 7, 1885	Gates	Burglary	N/A	Alfred Moore Scales
John Swanner	Black		M	December 7, 1885	Gates	Burglary	N/A	Alfred Moore Scales
Anderson Davis	Black		M	December 9, 1885	Mecklenburg	Burglary	Samuel G. Strickland, 48, white	Alfred Moore Scales
Nelson Stewart	Black		M	December 9, 1885	Mecklenburg	Burglary	Samuel G. Strickland, 48, white	Alfred Moore Scales
Louis Kilgore	Black	40	M	May 21, 1886	Henderson	Murder	Mattie Henderson, white	Alfred Moore Scales
George McNair	Black	19	M	June 1, 1886	Onslow	Rape	Kizzie A. Edens, 9, white	Alfred Moore Scales
Frank Gaston	Black		M	July 2, 1886	Rowan	Rape	Jerome Shepard, 40, white	Alfred Moore Scales
Jackson Lambert	Mixed (Note: 1/8th Cherokee (remaining admixture unspecified).)	40	M	July 9, 1886	Mecklenburg	Murder	Richard Wilson, white	Alfred Moore Scales
George Moore	Black		M	July 29, 1886	Mecklenburg	Rape	Sarah Moore, black (daughter)	Alfred Moore Scales
Alliday Wren	Black	27	M	November 11, 1886	Chatham	Rape-Burglary	Ann and Ann Marie Welch, 78 and 54, white	Alfred Moore Scales
Henry Artis	Black	35	M	March 11, 1887	Wayne	Murder	Ida Louise Dickerson, 20, white	Alfred Moore Scales
Albert Tolbern	Black	26	M	June 18, 1887	Granville	Burglary-Attempted rape	Belle E. Booth, 27, white	Alfred Moore Scales
Archibald Martin	Black		M	July 11, 1887	Richmond	Murder	William Henry McNeil, black	Alfred Moore Scales
Stephen Freeman	Black		M	July 11, 1888	New Hanover	Rape	Ada Bogan Sellers, 23, white	Alfred Moore Scales
James Byers	White	40	M	July 13, 1888	Wilkes	Murder	Henry Edwards, white	Alfred Moore Scales
William Houston	Black		M	July 19, 1888	Forsyth	Murder	Kate Cosby, black	Alfred Moore Scales
John Yancey	Black	43	M	January 25, 1889	Caswell	Murder	Bob Oliver, 26, black	Daniel Gould Fowle
Amma Ellis	Black	31	M	January 29, 1889	Sampson	Murder	John Allen Ellis, 53, black (father)	Daniel Gould Fowle
Howard Anderson	White	27	M	February 27, 1889	Wayne	Murder	William H. Porter, 37, white	Daniel Gould Fowle
Eli Ward	Black	26	M	May 3, 1889	Northampton	Burglary-Attempted murder	William Henry Farmer, 58, white	Daniel Gould Fowle
Lee Carson	Black	33	M	May 13, 1889	Cleveland	Burglary	Angeline Dean, 50+, white (Note: Suspected accomplice in the murder of James Philbeck (65, white) with his brother John who was lynched.)	Daniel Gould Fowle
William Weddington	Black		M	July 11, 1889	Mecklenburg	Murder	John Pearce, 25, white (police officer)	Daniel Gould Fowle
Matthew Banks	Black	16	M	November 29, 1889	Pasquotank	Rape	Florence Swain, 15, white	Daniel Gould Fowle

=== 1890s ===
Name	Race	Age	Sex	Date of execution	County	Crime	Victim(s)	Governor
J. C. Parish	White	42	M	January 10, 1890	Wake	Rape	Esther Parish, 13, white (daughter)	Daniel Gould Fowle
Elijah Moore	Black	26	M	February 7, 1890	Guilford	Murder	Laura Hyatt, 23, black	Daniel Gould Fowle
Manly Pankey	Black	19	M	February 7, 1890	Montgomery	Murder	Chambers Leak, 19, black	Daniel Gould Fowle
John Wilson	White	39	M	February 7, 1890	Yancey	Murder	Thomas Edge, 44, white	Daniel Gould Fowle
James Davis	White	42	M	March 28, 1890	Chatham	Murder	John D. Horton, 32, white	Daniel Gould Fowle
Stephen Jacobs	Native American	45	M	October 10, 1890	Robeson	Murder	Candice Earp, 52, white	Daniel Gould Fowle
Henry Brabham	Black	21	M	July 2, 1891	Mecklenburg	Murder-Robbery	John B. Mocca, 45, white	Thomas Michael Holt
Ben Bostick	Black	20	M	September 29, 1891	Moore	Murder	Jerome C. Currie, 27, white	Thomas Michael Holt
James Johnson	Black		M	December 11, 1891	Bladen	Murder-Rape	Florence Sutton, 10, black	Thomas Michael Holt
Badger Lawson	Black	22	M	December 26, 1891	Person	Murder	William and Fannie Dixon, 58 and 38, white	Thomas Michael Holt
Caroline Shipp	Black	18	F	January 22, 1892	Gaston	Murder	Male, 11 months, black (child)	Thomas Michael Holt
John Cox	Black	21	M	May 13, 1892	Jones	Murder	William Sutton, black	Thomas Michael Holt
Charles Blackman	Black	25	M	July 14, 1892	Guilford	Murder	Mary Morehead Blackman, 23, black (wife)	Thomas Michael Holt
Judge Headen	Black		M	October 20, 1892	Guilford	Murder-Robbery	Salathiel Swaim, 87, white	Thomas Michael Holt
Charles Reynolds	White	25	M	October 20, 1892	Guilford	Murder-Robbery	Salathiel Swaim, 87, white	Thomas Michael Holt
John Hambright	Black		M	February 17, 1893	Cleveland	Murder	Jenks Macobson, black	Elias Carr
Sam Neely	Black	15	M	December 1, 1893	Gaston	Burglary (Note: Also attempted to murder Allen.)	William Allen, 41, white	Elias Carr
Dan Gilchrist	Black	19	M	January 5, 1894	Richmond	Murder	Frank McKay, 46, black (father-in-law)	Elias Carr
Peter DeGraff	White	24	M	February 9, 1894	Forsyth	Murder	Ellen Smith, 20, white (girlfriend)	Elias Carr
Tom Coley	White	27	M	July 13, 1894	Franklin	Murder-Robbery	Sam Tucker, white	Elias Carr
Calvin Coley	White	22	M	July 13, 1894	Franklin	Murder-Robbery	Sam Tucker, white	Elias Carr
Orange Page	Black	45	M	August 3, 1894	Wake	Murder-Burglary	Rosa Haywood, 100, black	Elias Carr
Bob Matkins	Black	19	M	August 10, 1894	Alamance	Rape	Mary Phillips, 19, white	Elias Carr
George Mills	White	29	M	May 3, 1895	Wake	Murder	Ianna E. Wimberly, 17, white (niece)	Elias Carr
Anderson Brown	Black	33	M	July 25, 1895	Rowan	Murder	Callie Roberts, 23, black	Elias Carr
White Ferrand	Black	34	M	July 25, 1895	Rowan	Murder	Henry C. Owen, 54, white (police officer)	Elias Carr
George Washington	Black	18	M	December 4, 1895	Edgecombe	Murder-Robbery	Charles Neville, 30, white	Elias Carr
Thomas Covington	White	26	M	February 13, 1896	Catawba	Murder-Burglary	James Brown, 55, white	Elias Carr
Edward Fairley	Black	19	M	June 19, 1896	Robeson	Rape	Susan J. McNair, 17, black	Elias Carr
Henry Dowden	Black		M	July 2, 1896	Halifax	Murder	Matthew M. Dodd, 37, white	Elias Carr
Monroe Johnson	Black	40	M	February 8, 1897	Mecklenburg	Burglary (Note: Cowan was seriously wounded during the crime.)	Cowan Alexander and Maggie Shields, 69 and 28, white	Daniel Lindsay Russell
George Brodie	Black	20	M	September 1, 1897	Vance	Rape	Nannie Catlett, 18, white	Daniel Lindsay Russell
Doc Black	Black	23	M	September 1, 1897	Greene	Rape	Janie Stepp, 52, white	Daniel Lindsay Russell
Sam Wright	Black		M	November 10, 1897	Wayne	Murder-Robbery	Alonzo Carr, 35, white	Daniel Lindsay Russell
Ed Purvis	Black		M	November 17, 1897	Harnett	Murder	James N. Blackwell, 27, white	Daniel Lindsay Russell
Robert Ryan	White	41	M	December 23, 1897	Guilford	Murder-Robbery	Eliza Jennings Ryan, 27, white (wife)	Daniel Lindsay Russell
John Evans	Black	21	M	April 1, 1898	Richmond	Rape	Lillie Cole, 24, white	Daniel Lindsay Russell
Hatton Perry	Black	17	M	May 12, 1898	Beaufort	Rape	Annie Smith, 16, white	Daniel Lindsay Russell
Mit Sadler	Black	20	M	May 27, 1898	Cleveland	Murder	Will Wells, white	Daniel Lindsay Russell
John Mayes	White	39	M	November 11, 1898	Surry	Murder-Burglary	Martha Thompson Higgins, 66, white	Daniel Lindsay Russell
John Brooks	Black	20	M	November 26, 1898	Brunswick	Rape	Mrs. M. A. Chaires, white	Daniel Lindsay Russell
James Booker	Black	22	M	January 18, 1899	Wake	Murder	Mahala White, 37, black (girlfriend)	Daniel Lindsay Russell
Joe Jackson	Black	50+	M	May 18, 1899	Mecklenburg	Rape	Minnie Brown, 16, white	Daniel Lindsay Russell
Jules Alexander	Black	49	M	August 24, 1899	Mecklenburg	Rape	Julia Mullis, 58, white	Daniel Lindsay Russell
Avery Kale	White	19	M	October 19, 1899	Catawba	Murder	George E. Travis, 27, white	Daniel Lindsay Russell
Elijah Joyner	Black	27	M	November 10, 1899	Pitt	Murder-Robbery	Robert Sheppard, 20, white	Daniel Lindsay Russell

=== 1900–1910 ===
Name	Race	Age	Sex	Date of execution	County	Crime	Victim(s)	Governor
William Truesdale	Black	24	M	February 8, 1900	Mecklenburg	Murder	Janie Brown, 20, black (Note: Possibly pregnant when murdered.)	Daniel Lindsay Russell
Reuben Ross	Black		M	February 9, 1900	Robeson	Rape	Bettie Ingram, 20, white	Daniel Lindsay Russell
John Taylor	Black	23	M	March 15, 1900	Nash	Murder-Robbery	Robert Hester, 57, white	Daniel Lindsay Russell
Robert Fortune	Black	21	M	March 15, 1900	Nash	Murder-Robbery	Robert Hester, 57, white	Daniel Lindsay Russell
Thomas Jones	Black	29	M	August 31, 1900	Wake	Murder	Ella and Ida Jones, 33 and 14, black (wife and daughter) (Note: Also killed their four other children: Jesse (6), Nancy (3), Cleveland (2), and their baby.)	Daniel Lindsay Russell
William Edwards	Black	27	M	September 3, 1900	Rowan	Murder	William J. Kerns, 25, white (police officer)	Daniel Lindsay Russell
Chauncey Davis	Black	27	M	September 28, 1900	Edgecombe	Arson	Lavinia Battle and Henry Bunn, 30 and 21, black (Note: Battle's home was burned, and Bunn was killed during rescue efforts.)	Daniel Lindsay Russell
Archie Kinsauls	White	35	M	September 28, 1900	Sampson	Murder	John C. Herring, 23, white	Daniel Lindsay Russell
John Ruffin	Black	17	M	February 1, 1901	Alamance	Rape	Gertrude Skeen, 9, black	Charles Brantley Aycock
William Monroe	Black	18	M	September 13, 1901	Mecklenburg	Rape	Lida Philmon Martin, 16, white	Charles Brantley Aycock
Louis Council	Black	28	M	November 2, 1901	Cumberland	Rape	Lonnie M. West, 17, white	Charles Brantley Aycock
John Rose	White	26	M	February 26, 1902	Wilson	Murder	Thomas Farmer, 38, white	Charles Brantley Aycock
Ben Foster	Black	23	M	February 26, 1902	Buncombe	Burglary	Samuel Alexander, 24, white (Emma postmaster)	Charles Brantley Aycock
Dudley Johnston	White	25	M	February 26, 1902	Buncombe	Burglary	Samuel Alexander, 24, white (Emma postmaster)	Charles Brantley Aycock
Frank Shaw	Black	36	M	April 14, 1902	Robeson	Murder	Mary Elizabeth Ferguson, 34, black (stepsister)	Charles Brantley Aycock
Dick Fleming	Black	35	M	July 8, 1902	Rowan	Rape	Belle Livengood, 36, white	Charles Brantley Aycock
Archie Conley	Black	23	M	July 8, 1902	Rowan	Murder	Gus Davis, black	Charles Brantley Aycock
Calvin Elliott	Black	20	M	November 25, 1902	Lincoln	Rape	Julia K. Brown, 37, white	Charles Brantley Aycock
John Broadnax	Black	16	M	May 22, 1903	Rockingham	Murder-Burglary	Arthur Sidney Blair, 57, white	Charles Brantley Aycock
Wilfred Roseboro	Black	22	M	September 10, 1903	Iredell	Murder-Rape-Robbery	Dovie C. Beaver, 46, white	Charles Brantley Aycock
Cyrus Dixon	White	23	M	December 1, 1903	Jones	Murder	Godfrey A. Webber, 35, white	Charles Brantley Aycock
Jabel Register	White	35	M	February 25, 1904	Columbus	Murder-Robbery	Jesse Soles and James Staley, 58 and 40, white and black	Charles Brantley Aycock
Will Boggan	Black		M	February 25, 1904	Anson	Murder	John A. Sullivan, 38, white	Charles Brantley Aycock
Alfred Daniels	Black	33	M	May 19, 1904	Jones	Murder	Furnifold G. Simmons, 77, white	Charles Brantley Aycock
Frank Davis	White	30	M	May 19, 1904	Lenoir	Murder	Charles F. Pate, 36, white	Charles Brantley Aycock
Adam Hunt	Black	26	M	June 15, 1904	Person	Murder-Robbery	Fleetwood Wilkins, 25, white	Charles Brantley Aycock
Jesse Allen	Black	20	M	September 9, 1904	Granville	Rape	Jennie Oakley, 9, white	Charles Brantley Aycock
Ben Clark	Black	25	M	October 28, 1904	Cleveland	Murder	Barnett Edgar Hamrick, 36, white (Shelby police chief)	Charles Brantley Aycock
Neill Sellers	Black	24	M	November 16, 1904	Bladen	Murder-Rape	Blanche Packer, 21, white	Charles Brantley Aycock
Dave Brown	Black	24	M	November 16, 1904	Bladen	Murder-Rape	Blanche Packer, 21, white	Charles Brantley Aycock
Reuben Johnson	Black	21	M	December 2, 1904	Washington	Murder	Maggie Webb Johnson, 22, black	Charles Brantley Aycock
Walter Partridge	Black	18	M	April 6, 1905	Cumberland	Rape	Lillie Ida Rogers Hales, 25, white	Robert Broadnax Glenn
Dan Teachey	White	33	M	July 20, 1905	Duplin	Murder	William Robert Rivenbark, 25, white	Robert Broadnax Glenn
Ashton Moore	Black	19	M	September 2, 1905	Sampson	Rape	Kanella Brewington, 11, black	Robert Broadnax Glenn
J. W. Hammond	White	49	M	September 2, 1905	Forsyth	Murder	Henrietta Conway Hammond, 28, white (wife)	Robert Broadnax Glenn
Will Adams	Black	30	M	September 14, 1905	Wake	Murder	Mollie and Lillie Bridgers, 30 and 5, white	Robert Broadnax Glenn
Peter Smith	White	63	M	October 2, 1905	Madison	Rape	Eva Suttles, 15, white (Note: Also suspected in the murder of Hannah Plemmons (16, white).)	Robert Broadnax Glenn
Preston Daniels	Black	23	M	December 16, 1905	Martin	Murder	William Eborn, 28, black	Robert Broadnax Glenn
Will Carter	Black	17	M	December 20, 1905	Duplin	Rape	Virginia James, 6, white	Robert Broadnax Glenn
Bob Mitchell	Black	56	M	March 1, 1906	Bertie	Murder	Susan R. Mitchell, 32, black (wife)	Robert Broadnax Glenn
Henry Scott	Black	25	M	July 6, 1906	New Hanover (Federal)	Murder	Five people, white and black (Note: Skipper Edward B. Rummill (45, white), 1st mate John T. Hall (white), engineer C. L. Smith (white), cook John Falbe (white), and crewman John S. Coakley (black).)	Robert Broadnax Glenn
Henry Bailey	Black		M	August 31, 1906	Craven	Murder	John Macon Lancaster, 34, white	Robert Broadnax Glenn
Ben Williams	Black		M	December 20, 1906	Wake	Murder	Alex Clark, 20, black	Robert Broadnax Glenn
Henry Walker	Black	30	M	January 8, 1907	Alamance	Burglary	Lynn Banks Holt, 64, white	Robert Broadnax Glenn
Sylvester Barrett	Black	29	M	January 15, 1907	Pitt	Murder	Walter J. Lovett, white (constable)	Robert Broadnax Glenn
John Hodges	White	50	M	February 8, 1907	Durham	Murder	Mattie High Hodges, 36, white (wife)	Robert Broadnax Glenn
Freeman Jones	Black	35	M	February 8, 1907	Durham	Burglary-Attempted rape	Mrs. John W. Barker, 58, white	Robert Broadnax Glenn
Frank Bohannon	Black	30	M	February 8, 1907	Guilford	Murder	R. E. Betchman, 35, white	Robert Broadnax Glenn
Tom Walker	Black	30	M	April 15, 1907	Cumberland	Murder	Jefferson A. Chason and Owen Lockamy, 46 and 30, white (Fayetteville police chief and police officer)	Robert Broadnax Glenn
Will Banks	Black		M	August 20, 1907	Ashe	Murder	Frank McMillan, 45, black (uncle)	Robert Broadnax Glenn
James Rucker	Black		M	August 20, 1907	Buncombe	Rape	Susie Rucker-Upshire, 6, black (stepdaughter)	Robert Broadnax Glenn
Sam Murchison	Black	38	M	April 16, 1908	Cumberland	Murder	James H. Benton, 54, white (Fayetteville police chief)	Robert Broadnax Glenn
David Bryant	Black	15	M	May 7, 1908	Jones	Rape	Nannie Basden, 13, white	Robert Broadnax Glenn
Lewis Fletcher	Black	23	M	November 20, 1908	Mecklenburg	Murder	George Boyd, black	Robert Broadnax Glenn
Henry A. Harvey	Black	22	M	December 17, 1908	Richmond	Murder	Hugh Price, 26, black	Robert Broadnax Glenn
Will Graham	Black	39	M	December 18, 1908	Cabarrus	Rape	Pearl Tucker, 16, white (Note: Serial rapist, previously a black girl but avoided persecution by bribing the girl's parents.)	Robert Broadnax Glenn
William Ward	Black		M	March 3, 1909	Sampson	Rape-Burglary	Mollie McLeod, white	William Walton Kitchin
Robert Robeson	Black		M	June 12, 1909	Martin	Murder	Charles H. Whichard, 31, white	William Walton Kitchin
Henry Spivey	Black		M	March 12, 1910	Bladen	Murder	Frank Shaw, black (father-in-law)	William Walton Kitchin

== Electrocution ==
In 1910, local hangings were officially replaced by centralized electrocution, with the state creating a single execution chamber at Central Prison in Raleigh.

Name	Race	Age	Sex	Date of execution	County	Crime	Victim(s)	Governor
Walter Morrison	Black	35	M	March 18, 1910	Robeson	Rape	Polly A. Rogers, 29, Native American (Note: Previously convicted of assault with intent to commit rape.)	William Walton Kitchin
Phillip Mills	Black	23	M	February 10, 1911	Transylvania	Murder	Martha Gaston Mills, 20, black (wife)	William Walton Kitchin
Nathan Montague	Black	28	M	February 15, 1911	Granville	Murder-Rape-Burglary	Three victims, white (Note: James Leyton Saunders (62), his daughter Mattie Saunders (19), and her daughter Irene Overton (3). Mattie was also raped.)	William Walton Kitchin
James Allison	White	51	M	February 24, 1911	Buncombe	Murder	Floyd McGhee, 37, white (Asheville policeman) (Note: Previously murdered a black man and a white man named Roberts; acquitted in both cases.)	William Walton Kitchin
Lewis West	Black	24	M	May 5, 1911	Wilson	Murder	George W. Mumford, 41, white (deputy sheriff)	William Walton Kitchin
Norman Lewis	Black	22	M	May 12, 1911	Nash	Murder	James M. Stalling, 46, white (Spring Hope police chief)	William Walton Kitchin
Norvell Marshall Jr.	Black	31	M	October 27, 1911	Warren	Rape	Lizzie Abbott Chaplin, 21, white	William Walton Kitchin
Ross French	Native American	21	M	November 24, 1911	Swain	Murder-Rape	Ethel Shuler, 15, white	William Walton Kitchin
Zachary Taylor Love	Black	28	M	December 1, 1911	Haywood	Murder	Fred Morehead, 29, black	William Walton Kitchin
L. M. Sandlin	White	42	M	December 29, 1911	New Hanover	Murder	Dova Sandlin, 53, white (wife)	William Walton Kitchin
Brad Bagley	Black	35	M	May 17, 1912	Martin	Murder	William R. White, 43, white (Williamston police chief)	William Walton Kitchin
Arthur B. Wilkins	Black	27	M	June 21, 1912	Nash	Murder	Ida Wilkins, 21, black (wife)	William Walton Kitchin
Redden W. Cobb	White	23	M	March 6, 1914	Halifax	Murder-Robbery	Thomas Shaw, 48, white	Locke Craig
Sidney Finger	Black	21	M	June 19, 1914	Rowan	Murder-Robbery	Preston Lyerly, 25, white	Locke Craig
Grady Lane	Black	20	M	August 21, 1914	Moore	Murder-Robbery	George McCain, black	Locke Craig
Jim Cameron	Black	25	M	August 28, 1914	Moore	Murder	John Archibald Blue, 33, white	Locke Craig
Harvey Gannaway	Black	30	M	October 16, 1914	Forsyth	Murder	Sallie Gannaway, 28, black (wife)	Locke Craig
Howard Craig	Black	22	M	December 4, 1914	Stanly	Rape	Vera Odessa Corgin, 13, white	Locke Craig
Willie Bell	Black	23	M	July 8, 1915	Durham	Murder-Robbery	Burkett N. Mann, 61, white	Locke Craig
Charles Trull	White	23	M	September 3, 1915	Mecklenburg	Murder-Robbery	Sidney Swain, 50, white	Locke Craig
Jeff Dorsett Jr.	Black	27	M	January 28, 1916	Guilford	Murder-Robbery	John M. Swain, 34, white	Locke Craig
Ed Walker	Black	26	M	January 28, 1916	Guilford	Murder-Robbery	John M. Swain, 34, white	Locke Craig
James Cooper	Black	26	M	February 11, 1916	Rowan	Murder	Lucinda Price, 19, black (mistress)	Locke Craig
Ernest Lowry	Black	24	M	February 25, 1916	Gaston	Murder-Robbery	Grant Davis, 45, black	Locke Craig
George Poston	Black	24	M	February 25, 1916	Gaston	Murder-Robbery	Grant Davis, 45, black	Locke Craig
Lawrence Swinson	Black	23	M	July 7, 1916	New Hanover	Burglary-Attempted murder (Note: Swinson had been implicated in several burglaries, at least one of which involved an attempted rape.)	Henry C. Mason, 33, white	Locke Craig
Willie Black	Black	14	M	July 21, 1916	Greene	Rape	Mattie Tyson, 6, white	Locke Craig
Arthur Smith	Black	26	M	August 1, 1916	Cumberland	Murder	Fannie Atkins Smith, 30, black (wife)	Locke Craig
John Savage	Black	51	M	August 4, 1916	Washington	Murder-Burglary	George H. Bowen, 78, white (Note: Also killed the man's daughter.)	Locke Craig
Bunke Maske	Black	24	M	May 25, 1917	Union	Murder	Edgar R. Williams, 39, white (Wingate police officer)	Thomas Walter Bickett
Charles Williams	Black	60	M	September 25, 1917	Iredell	Murder	John H. Miller, 36, white (deputy sheriff)	Thomas Walter Bickett
Lee Perkins	Black	23	M	October 10, 1917	Craven	Burglary-Attempted rape (Note: Attempted to rape Wilson's four daughters.)	Willis A. Wilson, 41, white	Thomas Walter Bickett
Jeremiah Terry	White	60	M	November 9, 1917	Guilford	Murder	John R. Stewart, 54, white	Thomas Walter Bickett
Earle Neville	Black	24	M	March 15, 1918	Wake	Rape-Burglary	Sybil Hawkins Celey, 31, white, white	Thomas Walter Bickett
Willie Williams	Black	20	M	April 26, 1918	Buncombe	Rape-Robbery	Bessie McDowell, 43, white	Thomas Walter Bickett
Frank Moore	Black	21	M	May 24, 1918	Duplin	Murder	Walter Heath, 31, white	Thomas Walter Bickett
Herbert Perry	Black	34	M	May 25, 1918	Granville	Rape	Katie May, 14, white	Thomas Walter Bickett
Lonnie Council	Black	38	M	June 7, 1918	Durham	Murder	Robert Jones, 41, black	Thomas Walter Bickett
Baxter Cain	Black	33	M	September 13, 1918	Rowan	Murder-Robbery	Abel Harris, 30, black	Thomas Walter Bickett
Napoleon Spencer	Black	16	M	December 20, 1918	Surry (Note: Change of venue from Forsyth County.)	Murder	Alvie Siewers Hester, 24, white (Note: Also murdered her husband, 27-year-old Harvey Hester.)	Thomas Walter Bickett
Jim Warren	Black	19	M	April 26, 1919	Greene	Murder	Joseph Denver Hughes, 43, white	Thomas Walter Bickett
Tom Gwynn	Black	23	M	June 27, 1919	Catawba	Rape	Ruth Hildebrand, 16, white	Thomas Walter Bickett
Aaron Dupree	Black	34	M	November 14, 1919	Hoke	Murder	McCormick Brown, 24, white	Thomas Walter Bickett
Churchill Godley	White	34	M	January 16, 1920	Johnston	Rape	Mamie Beasley, 9, white	Thomas Walter Bickett
Sanford Cain	White	41	M	March 5, 1920	Surry	Murder	Riley Easter, 57, white	Thomas Walter Bickett
Joseph Cain	White	38	M	March 5, 1920	Surry	Murder	Riley Easter, 57, white	Thomas Walter Bickett
Ralph Conner	Black	21	M	September 20, 1920	Iredell	Murder	Robert Lloyd Cloaninger, 34, white (deputy sheriff)	Thomas Walter Bickett
Andrew Jackson	Black	30	M	November 5, 1920	Lincoln	Rape	Bettie E. Keever, 38, white	Thomas Walter Bickett
Arthur McDowell	Black	30	M	December 3, 1920	Davidson	Rape	Minnie McCarn, 48, white (Note: Previously murdered Lizzie Hill (black) in Winston-Salem and committed this crime after fleeing the city.)	Thomas Walter Bickett
Tom Johnson	Mixed (Note: Mulatto.)	20	M	December 3, 1920	Guilford	Rape-Burglary	Mattie Andrews Artin, 19, white	Thomas Walter Bickett
William Hopkins	Black	21	M	March 21, 1921	Sampson	Murder-Robbery	Louis E. Ramey, 30, white	Cameron A. Morrison
Luke Fraizer	Black	33	M	May 27, 1921	Craven	Murder	John Mann, 36, black	Cameron A. Morrison
Frank Henderson	White	34	M	October 10, 1921	Madison	Murder	Ella Henderson, 29, white (wife)	Cameron A. Morrison
J. T. Harris	White	52	M	October 20, 1921	Buncombe	Murder	Fredric Wilhelm Monnish, 60, white	Cameron A. Morrison
Harry Caldwell	Black	33	M	October 31, 1921	Yancey	Murder-Robbery	Herman Jones, 39, white	Cameron A. Morrison
W. P. Westmoreland	White	38	M	November 21, 1921	Iredell	Murder-Robbery	James H. Nantz, 34, white	Cameron A. Morrison
Claude Morehead	Black	22	M	November 30, 1921	Guilford	Murder	Alma Mathis Morehead, 30, black (wife)	Cameron A. Morrison
Joseph Thomas	Black	20	M	September 15, 1922	Moore	Rape	Gertrude Ketchen, 22, white (Note: Also shot and disabled her 38-year-old husband.)	Cameron A. Morrison
Angus Murphy	Black	36	M	September 15, 1922	Moore	Rape	Gertrude Ketchen, 22, white	Cameron A. Morrison
McIver Burnett	Black	17	M	October 12, 1922	Wake	Rape-Burglary	Melissa McGhee, 19, white	Cameron A. Morrison
Robert Williams	Black	25	M	March 1, 1923	Columbus	Murder	Bradley Cribb, 42, white (special policeman)	Cameron A. Morrison
William Hardison	Black	16	M	April 27, 1923	Onslow	Murder-Robbery	Cyrus M. Jones, 38, white	Cameron A. Morrison
Wiley Perry	Black	29	M	May 9, 1923	Granville	Murder	Roy H. Aiken, 26, white (special deputy)	Cameron A. Morrison
D. M. Nobles	White	36	M	June 26, 1923	Columbus	Murder	Henry Bishop Nobles, 32, white (cousin)	Cameron A. Morrison
Ed Dill	Black	43	M	June 28, 1923	Beaufort	Rape	Mattie E. Williams, white	Cameron A. Morrison
Jim Miller	Black	38	M	October 5, 1923	Lenoir	Murder	John Sutton, 42, white	Cameron A. Morrison
John Goss	Black	44	M	December 7, 1923	Mitchell	Rape-Robbery	Margaret Alice Parker Thomas, 68, white (Note: Serving 15 years as a trusty on a road gang for a similar crime against a black woman in New Hanover County at time of crime.)	Cameron A. Morrison
Lee Washington	Black	20	M	December 28, 1923	Nash	Rape	Mrs. A. J. Herring, white	Cameron A. Morrison
Vance Morgan	Black	23	M	November 28, 1924	Union	Murder-Robbery	A. Butler Funderburk, 54, white	Cameron A. Morrison
Kenneth Hale	Black	17	M	January 5, 1925	Davidson	Murder-Robbery	Charles Garwood, 30, white	Cameron A. Morrison
John Leake	Black	18	M	January 5, 1925	Davidson	Murder-Robbery	Charles Garwood, 30, white	Cameron A. Morrison
David Jones	Black	21	M	February 18, 1925	Chowan	Murder-Robbery	Samuel Humphrey Small, 53, white	Angus Wilton McLean
Elmer Stewart	White	23	M	April 17, 1925	Brunswick	Murder	Samuel Lilly (U. S. Deputy Marshal) and Leon George (Wilmington city prohibition officer), 46 and 51, white	Angus Wilton McLean
Charles Stewart	White	51	M	April 17, 1925	Brunswick	Murder	Samuel Lilly (U. S. Deputy Marshal) and Leon George (Wilmington city prohibition officer), 46 and 51, white	Angus Wilton McLean
Len Walton	Black	27	M	April 21, 1925	Hoke	Murder	Jeneral Dewey Castleberry, 25, white	Angus Wilton McLean
William Singleton	Black	17	M	May 8, 1925	Craven	Murder	Henry N. Banks, 45, white	Angus Wilton McLean
Jim Collins	Black	19	M	June 5, 1925	Anson	Murder	Adam Chalmers Sedberry, 37, white	Angus Wilton McLean
Will Williams	Black	25	M	June 12, 1925	Scotland	Murder	Frank Green, 44, black	Angus Wilton McLean
George Love	Black	33	M	June 19, 1925	Henderson (Note: Second trial. First trial held in Haywood County.)	Murder	William Brock, 40, white	Angus Wilton McLean
Thomas Robinson	Black	26	M	October 2, 1925	New Hanover	Rape	Female, 19, white	Angus Wilton McLean
John McMillan	Black	18	M	October 2, 1925	Moore	Rape	Willie Idell Sides, 24, white	Angus Wilton McLean
John Dawkins	Black	20	M	January 8, 1926	Forsyth	Murder-Robbery	Joseph Henry Vaughn, 52, white	Angus Wilton McLean
Arthur Montague	Black	22	M	January 22, 1926	Burke	Rape-Burglary	Female, 13, white	Angus Wilton McLean
Fred Jones	Black	24	M	June 11, 1926	Forsyth	Murder-Robbery	Joseph Monroe King, 41, white	Angus Wilton McLean
John Williams	Black	30	M	September 21, 1926	Halifax	Murder	Alex Bradley, 66, black	Angus Wilton McLean
Robert Lumpkin	Black	27	M	March 11, 1927	Robeson	Murder	Marion Boyd Rogers, 32, white (Rowland police chief)	Angus Wilton McLean
Ernest Walker	Mixed (Note: Mix of white, black, and Native Croatoan ancestry.)	39	M	April 22, 1927	Durham	Murder-Burglary	Joseph Cassidy, 39, black (Note: Also raped his wife, Louise Cassidy.)	Angus Wilton McLean
Pearl Mitchell	Black	29	M	June 10, 1927	Chatham	Murder-Burglary	William Larkin Fogleman, 58, white	Angus Wilton McLean
George Bazemore	Black	26	M	September 23, 1927	Greene	Murder-Robbery	Gordon Yelverton, 16, white	Angus Wilton McLean
Hector Graham	Black	41	M	December 9, 1927	Hoke	Murder	Paul W. Johnson, 30, white	Angus Wilton McLean
David Devlin	Black	22	M	February 17, 1928	Rowan	Murder	Linzy T. Yarbrough, 48, white (deputy sheriff) (Note: Same crime as John Clyburn.)	Angus Wilton McLean
Clarence Thomas	Black	25	M	April 27, 1928	Forsyth	Murder	Barnett Branson Graham, 69, white (night watchman) (Note: Also indicted for the murder of police sergeant Leland Glenn Teague (32, white).)	Angus Wilton McLean
John Clyburn	Black	22	M	May 25, 1928	Mecklenburg	Murder-Robbery	Cyrus M. Fink, 37, white (Note: Same crime as David Devlin.)	Angus Wilton McLean
Larry Newsome	Black	22	M	September 28, 1928	Wayne	Murder-Rape	Beulah Tedder, 15, white	Angus Wilton McLean
Leo McCurrie	Black	28	M	April 26, 1929	Gaston	Murder	John Neal Dixon, 67, white	Oliver Max Gardner
Freddie Willey	Black	16	M	June 28, 1929	Randolph	Rape	Estelle McKinnon, 34, white	Oliver Max Gardner
Willis Buckner	White	28	M	September 12, 1929	Craven	Rape	Beatrice Eubanks, 10, white	Oliver Max Gardner
Ernest Fox	Black	19	M	November 22, 1929	Edgecombe	Murder-Robbery	Jesse Harvey Taylor, 19, white	Oliver Max Gardner
Ray Evans	Black	21	M	March 14, 1930	Richmond	Murder	William David Smith, 51, white (constable)	Oliver Max Gardner
John Macon	Black	34	M	April 4, 1930	Warren	Murder	Samuel William Pinnell, 35, white (deputy) (Note: Also wanted for a murder committed in Franklin County in 1912.)	Oliver Max Gardner
Robert Magnum	Black	22	M	April 17, 1930	Franklin	Rape	Leugeney Pearce, 46, white (Note: Also stabbed James Pearce (69), who died within 10 days from the wound to his neck.)	Oliver Max Gardner
James Brumfield	Black	23	M	May 9, 1930	Union	Burglary	Marcus D. and Velma Preslar, 57 and 18, white (Note: Attempted to kidnap Velma.)	Oliver Max Gardner
James Spivey	White	25	M	May 23, 1930	Lee	Murder-Rape	Bettie Spivey, 19, white (cousin)	Oliver Max Gardner
Berry Richardson	Black	20	M	September 26, 1930	Wilson	Murder-Burglary	Calvin Columbus Williford, 70, white	Oliver Max Gardner
Aaron Sharp	Black	22	M	September 26, 1930	Wilson	Murder-Burglary	Calvin Columbus Williford, 70, white	Oliver Max Gardner
Harvey Lawrence	Black	17	M	October 10, 1930	Hertford	Burglary-Attempted rape	Frank T. and Mary Bryant Railey, 75 and 35, white	Oliver Max Gardner
Willie Massey	Black	25	M	November 7, 1930	Durham	Murder	Floyd and Dora Moore, 37 and 34, black	Oliver Max Gardner
Will Sloan	Black	28	M	November 7, 1930	Person	Murder-Rape	Phoebe Yancey and Mary Ann Gillis, 79 and 20, white (Note: Phoebe murdered, Mary Ann raped. Also murdered Elsa Marshall (24, white) in Greenburgh, New York.)	Oliver Max Gardner
Sidney Gattis	Black	49	M	January 23, 1931	Durham	Murder	Etta Gaston Petty, 32, black	Oliver Max Gardner
Thomas Bardon	Black	29	M	February 13, 1931	Vance	Burglary	Matthews family, white (Note: 26-year-old Jesse Mathews was seriously injured during the crime.)	Oliver Max Gardner
Dave McRae	Black	25	M	February 13, 1931	Scotland	Murder-Robbery	Alfred Ellyson, 81, white	Oliver Max Gardner
Wilson Autry	Black	19	M	August 10, 1931	Union	Rape	Essie Brooks Keziah, 20, white	Oliver Max Gardner
Ben Goldston	Black	36	M	August 21, 1931	Chatham	Murder	John Headen, 24, black	Oliver Max Gardner
Bernice Matthews	Black	20	M	December 11, 1931	Rowan	Murder-Robbery	Albert Franklin Stewart, 44, white	Oliver Max Gardner
J. W. Ballard	Black	17	M	December 11, 1931	Rowan	Murder-Robbery	Albert Franklin Stewart, 44, white	Oliver Max Gardner
Chevis Herring	Black	23	M	December 18, 1931	Sampson	Murder-Robbery	Frederick F. Newton, 70, white (Kerr postmaster)	Oliver Max Gardner
Asbury Respus	Black	46	M	January 8, 1932	Guilford	Murder-Rape	Vera DeWitt Leonard, 8, white (Note: Serial killer, also murdered at least seven other people.)	Oliver Max Gardner
John Myers	Black	30	M	March 25, 1932	Pitt	Murder-Robbery	Robert Hagan Hodges, 48, white	Oliver Max Gardner
Dudley Moore	Black	19	M	April 29, 1932	Davidson	Murder-Rape	Victoria Tussey Berrier, 59, white (foster mother)	Oliver Max Gardner
Plato Edney	White	34	M	July 15, 1932	Henderson	Murder	Marjorie Alexine Hill Edney, 35, white (wife)	Oliver Max Gardner
Noel Donnell	Black	24	M	August 26, 1932	Guilford	Murder-Robbery	Robert Boston Andrew, 63, white (Sedalia postmaster)	Oliver Max Gardner
Leroy Lee	Black	24	M	October 14, 1932	Guilford	Murder-Robbery	Robert Boston Andrew, 63, white (Sedalia postmaster)	Oliver Max Gardner
Harvey Wallace	Black	32	M	December 16, 1932	Lee	Murder-Robbery	Norton H. Perry, 61, white (Note: Also murdered Thomas Beal (66, white) during the same crime.)	Oliver Max Gardner
Alec Grier	Black	22	M	December 16, 1932	Gaston	Murder-Robbery	Harold Carter, 18, white	Oliver Max Gardner
Hezzie Avant	White	30	M	January 27, 1933	Scotland	Murder	Smithie Evans Calder, 19, white (Note: Avant, who claimed to have fathered three of Calder's children, was sentenced to one day in jail for a federal white slavery charge after Calder told authorities Avant forced her to live "under a gun"; he murdered her ten days after his release.)	John C. B. Ehringhaus
David McNair	Black	23	M	May 19, 1933	Guilford	Murder-Robbery	Mary McCown, 35, white	John C. B. Ehringhaus
Clay Foglemann	White	30	M	August 4, 1933	Rockingham	Murder-Robbery	William J. Carter, 61, white	John C. B. Ehringhaus
Bryant Stone	White	44	M	September 8, 1933	Wilkes	Murder	Wayne W. Norman, 40, white (son-in-law)	John C. B. Ehringhaus
Johnny Lee	Black	21	M	September 15, 1933	Harnett	Murder	Jacob Handy Hill, 44, black	John C. B. Ehringhaus
James Johnson	Black	26	M	March 16, 1934	Hoke	Murder	Virginia Leach, 19, black (girlfriend)	John C. B. Ehringhaus
Jesse Brooks	Black	46	M	March 16, 1934	Durham	Murder-Robbery	Roland Anderson Gill, 36, white (detective)	John C. B. Ehringhaus
Walter Thaxton	Black	30	M	March 23, 1934	Person	Murder	Marion Butler Gentry, 37, white	John C. B. Ehringhaus
Theodore Cooper	Black	29	M	April 27, 1934	Durham	Murder	John Nevious Lassiter, 42, white	John C. B. Ehringhaus
James Sheffield	White	47	M	May 18, 1934	Haywood	Murder	James Miller, 31, white	John C. B. Ehringhaus
Mike Stefanoff	White	45	M	May 18, 1934	Alexander	Murder-Robbery	Thomas Chauncey Barnes, 45, white	John C. B. Ehringhaus
Ossie Smith	Black	20	M	June 15, 1934	Northampton	Murder-Robbery	J. Edward Hedspeth, white	John C. B. Ehringhaus
Joe Dalton	White	31	M	June 22, 1934	Henderson	Murder	Mabel Zula Brown Dalton, 29, white (wife)	John C. B. Ehringhaus
Clyde Ferrell	White	25	M	July 6, 1934	Durham	Murder-Robbery	Thaddeus Tilley, 26, white	John C. B. Ehringhaus
John Edwards	Black	17	M	July 6, 1934	Mecklenburg	Murder-Robbery	John W. Brown, 62, white	John C. B. Ehringhaus
George Keaton	Black	28	M	September 21, 1934	Forsyth	Murder	Annie Lee Thigpen, 18, black (girlfriend)	John C. B. Ehringhaus
Emanuel Bitting	Black	42	M	September 28, 1934	Person	Murder	Theophilus Moore Clayton, 62, white	John C. B. Ehringhaus
Willie Crockett	Black	22	M	September 28, 1934	Forsyth	Murder	Patsy Hilton Crockett, 18, black (wife)	John C. B. Ehringhaus
Preston Howard	Black	18	M	November 16, 1934	Sampson	Murder-Robbery	Howard Jernigan, 23, white	John C. B. Ehringhaus
Johnny Hart	Black	22	M	November 16, 1934	Sampson	Murder-Robbery	Howard Jernigan, 23, white	John C. B. Ehringhaus
Tom Johnson	Black	22	M	November 16, 1934	Sampson	Murder-Robbery	Howard Jernigan, 23, white	John C. B. Ehringhaus
R. E. Black	White	25	M	December 7, 1934	Alexander	Murder-Robbery	Thomas Chauncey Barnes, 45, white	John C. B. Ehringhaus
Lester Green	White	25	M	December 7, 1934	Alexander	Murder-Robbery	Thomas Chauncey Barnes, 45, white	John C. B. Ehringhaus
Bascom Green	White	48	M	December 7, 1934	Alexander	Murder-Robbery	Thomas Chauncey Barnes, 45, white	John C. B. Ehringhaus
Rufus Satterfield	White	44	M	December 13, 1934	Wayne	Murder	Herbert Grice, 32, white	John C. B. Ehringhaus
Sidney Etheridge	White	44	M	March 15, 1935	Onslow	Murder-Burglary	Mamie Dickerson Moore, 69, white	John C. B. Ehringhaus
Louis Sentelle	White	39	M	July 12, 1935	Cleveland	Murder	Florence Elizabeth Jones Drake, 23, white	John C. B. Ehringhaus
George Whitfield	Black	21	M	July 12, 1935	Guilford	Rape-Burglary	Mrs. R. Bill Douglass, white	John C. B. Ehringhaus
Dortch Waller	Black	43	M	August 2, 1935	Granville	Murder-Robbery	John H. Harris, 51, white	John C. B. Ehringhaus
William T. Williams	Black	25	M	August 2, 1935	Columbus	Murder	Blanche Bennett Williams, 22, black (wife)	John C. B. Ehringhaus
Houston McMillan	Black	19	M	August 9, 1935	Cumberland	Murder-Robbery	Robert Williams, 62, white	John C. B. Ehringhaus
Vander Glover	Black	39	M	August 9, 1935	Cumberland	Murder-Robbery	Robert Williams, 62, white	John C. B. Ehringhaus
Caesar Miller	Black	18	M	September 6, 1935	Craven	Murder	Jefferson Davis Gwaltney, 72, white	John C. B. Ehringhaus
Robert Thomas	White	23	M	October 4, 1935	Madison	Murder-Robbery	William Thomas, 70, white (Thomas and Gunter's granduncle)	John C. B. Ehringhaus
Otis Gunter	White	20	M	October 4, 1935	Madison	Murder-Robbery	William Thomas, 70, white (Thomas and Gunter's granduncle)	John C. B. Ehringhaus
Arthur Gosnell	White	18	M	October 4, 1935	Madison	Murder-Robbery	William Thomas, 70, white (Thomas and Gunter's granduncle)	John C. B. Ehringhaus

== Gas asphyxiation ==
In November 1935, North Carolina officially added gas asphyxiation as a method of execution alongside electrocution. The state completed building its new execution chamber that December, which was arranged so that it could be used for both gas asphyxiations and electrocutions; prison officials could choose which method to use and switch between them "in a second," as some existing cases required electrocution. The state's existing electric chair was moved to the new execution chamber but had its electrodes and wires removed for gas asphyxiations. The state eventually fully transitioned to gas asphyxiations in 1938, despite continued support for the restoration of electrocution by state and prison officials.
Executions by electrocution

Name	Race	Age	Sex	Date of execution	County	Crime	Victim(s)	Governor
Robert Dunlap	Black	26	M	January 17, 1936	Buncombe	Murder	Three people, black (Note: His 26-year-old girlfriend Ola Pauline McMillan, her mother, and a young girl.)	John C. B. Ehringhaus
Allen Foster	Black	20	M	January 24, 1936	Hoke	Rape-Burglary	Lillie Capps, 20, white	John C. B. Ehringhaus
Ed Jenkins	White	40	M	January 31, 1936	Gaston	Murder	Paul Hoke Collins, 35, white	John C. B. Ehringhaus
J. T. Sanford	Black	30	M	February 7, 1936	Durham	Murder-Robbery	Nathaniel Malone, 43, black	John C. B. Ehringhaus
Thomas Watson	Black	32	M	February 7, 1936	Durham	Murder-Robbery	Nathaniel Malone, 43, black	John C. B. Ehringhaus
William Long	Black	19	M	February 7, 1936	Alamance	Murder-Robbery	Sam Minor, 65, black	John C. B. Ehringhaus
Jake Johnson	Black	36	M	March 19, 1936	Rockingham	Rape-Burglary	Annie Grogan, 68, white (Note: Suspected of being a serial rapist, previously served 10 years for other sex crimes.)	John C. B. Ehringhaus
Ed Hester	White	19	M	March 20, 1936	Wake	Murder	Paul Hunnicutt, 20, white (Note: Serving a 25- to 30-year sentence with hard labor for the murder of his 28-year-old brother-in-law John C. Abernathy at time of crime.)	John C. B. Ehringhaus
Bright Buffkin	White	43	M	March 27, 1936	Columbus	Murder	Daniel Paul Barefoot, 24, white	John C. B. Ehringhaus
Germie Williams	Black	23	M	May 8, 1936	Forsyth	Murder-Robbery	John W. Gant, 60, black	John C. B. Ehringhaus
Lawrence Dingle	Black	32	M	May 8, 1936	Forsyth	Murder-Robbery	John W. Gant, 60, black	John C. B. Ehringhaus
Marvin Batten	White	29	M	May 29, 1936	Johnston	Murder	Lyda Coffe Daughtry, 30, white	John C. B. Ehringhaus
John Horne	White	37	M	June 19, 1936	Chowan	Murder	Nellie Bennett Horne, 31, white (wife)	John C. B. Ehringhaus
Henry Grier	Black	43	M	July 10, 1936	Forsyth	Murder	Annie Giles, 27, black (common-law wife)	John C. B. Ehringhaus
William Hodgin	Black	36	M	July 17, 1936	Forsyth	Murder (Note: Described as a "homosexual killing".)	James Herbert Searcy, 70, black	John C. B. Ehringhaus
Willie Galman	Black	21	M	August 21, 1936	Forsyth	Murder	John Gaston, 43, black	John C. B. Ehringhaus
John Kinyon	Black	73	M	August 21, 1936	Granville	Rape	Geraldine Peed, 12, white	John C. B. Ehringhaus
J. B. Carden	White	42	M	September 4, 1936	Durham	Murder	Vera Wagoner Carden, 33, white (wife)	John C. B. Ehringhaus
George Alston	Black	21	M	September 4, 1936	Orange	Murder	Helen Massey, 16, black (girlfriend)	John C. B. Ehringhaus
John Pressley	Black	43	M	November 13, 1936	Gaston	Murder	Sylvester Glover, 25, black	John C. B. Ehringhaus
Evans Macklin	Black	20	M	November 20, 1936	Halifax	Murder-Robbery	Andrew P. Moore, 47, white (police chief)	John C. B. Ehringhaus
Willie Tate	Black	29	M	November 20, 1936	Pitt	Murder	Alexander Warren, 22, white	John C. B. Ehringhaus
Martin Moore	Black	23	M	December 11, 1936	Buncombe	Murder-Burglary	Helen Clevenger, 18, white	John C. B. Ehringhaus
Robert Brown	Black	19	M	July 9, 1937	Craven	Murder-Robbery	Joseph B. Peacock, 64, white	Clyde R. Hoey
Sam Jones	Black	21	M	July 16, 1937	Mecklenburg	Murder-Robbery	Thomas Clifford Fowler, 21, white	Clyde R. Hoey
Fred Steele	Black	22	M	July 16, 1937	Mecklenburg	Murder-Robbery	Thomas Clifford Fowler, 21, white	Clyde R. Hoey
Hunter Winchester	Black	24	M	July 23, 1937	Guilford	Murder	Mabel Teele Winchester, 24, black (wife)	Clyde R. Hoey
Fred Grey	Black	26	M	July 23, 1937	Onslow	Murder	Lettuce Hayes Grey, 27, black (wife)	Clyde R. Hoey
A. W. Watson	White	20	M	July 30, 1937	Martin	Murder-Robbery	Thomas S. Holliday, 24, white	Clyde R. Hoey
Thomas Perry	Black	23	M	July 30, 1937	Wake	Rape	Pearl Thomas, 40, black (Note: Serial rapist, previously convicted of assaulting two black women was and served two terms on a chain gang.)	Clyde R. Hoey
George Exum	Black	23	M	August 6, 1937	Wayne	Murder-Robbery	Obelia Fort Exum, 64, black (aunt)	Clyde R. Hoey
Larry McNeill	Black	17	M	August 13, 1937	Robeson	Murder	Bernice Cox, 24, white (Note: Non-fatally poisoned three others during the same crime.)	Clyde R. Hoey
James McNeill	Black	21	M	August 13, 1937	Harnett	Murder	Suelie Eason, 20, black	Clyde R. Hoey
Walter Caldwell	Black	37	M	December 10, 1937	Iredell	Rape-Burglary	Macie Smith, 28, white	Clyde R. Hoey
William Perry	Black	18	M	December 10, 1937	Chatham	Murder-Rape	Margaret Petty Hammett, 46, white	Clyde R. Hoey
James Sermons	Black	29	M	January 21, 1938	Forsyth	Murder	Carlyle Jesse Miller, 30, white (Note: Attempted to rape Miller's female companion and also confessed to armed robbery, burglary, carjacking, and another attempted rape.)	Clyde R. Hoey
James Marshall	Black	30	M	February 4, 1938	Wayne	Burglary (Note: Burglary was part of a larger crime spree involving multiple burglaries, robberies, and kidnappings.)	Robert Smith, 40, white	Clyde R. Hoey
Milford Exum	White	40	M	February 18, 1938	Wayne	Murder-Burglary	Jim Williams, 60, black	Clyde R. Hoey
Edgar Smoak	White	40	M	February 18, 1938	New Hanover	Murder	Annie Thelma Smoak, 15, white (daughter) (Note: Possible serial killer, also suspected of poisoning his two wives George Mae Jones Smoak (25) and Alice Mason Smoak (32).)	Clyde R. Hoey
Waddell Hadley	Black	22	M	April 29, 1938	Sampson	Rape	Mittie Sessoms, 53, white	Clyde R. Hoey
Sylvester Outlaw	Black	32	M	April 29, 1938	Duplin	Rape	Clara Coe, 18, white (Note: Same crime as Lonnie Gardner and Apsom Outlaw, his brother-in-law and brother respectively.)	Clyde R. Hoey
Empire Baldwin	Black	25	M	June 10, 1938	Columbus	Rape-Kidnap	Kathleen Polley, 29, white	Clyde R. Hoey
Lonnie Gardner	Black	27	M	June 17, 1938	Duplin	Rape	Clara Coe, 18, white (Note: Same crime as Sylvester Outlaw, Apsom's brother.)	Clyde R. Hoey
Apsom Outlaw	Black	29	M	June 17, 1938	Duplin	Rape	Clara Coe, 18, white	Clyde R. Hoey
Wash Turner	White	36	M	July 1, 1938	Buncombe	Murder	George Cabell Penn, 22, white (patrolman)	Clyde R. Hoey
Bill Payne	White	41	M	July 1, 1938	Buncombe	Murder	George Cabell Penn, 22, white (patrolman)	Clyde R. Hoey
Wiley Brice	Black	35	M	July 1, 1938	Alamance	Murder-Robbery	Shellie Lee, 37, black	Clyde R. Hoey
L. J. Jefferson	Black	17	M	September 23, 1938	Forsyth	Murder-Robbery	Herman Walter Fogleman, 25, white	Clyde R. Hoey
Tom Linney	Black	32	M	September 23, 1938	Forsyth	Murder-Robbery	Herman Walter Fogleman, 25, white	Clyde R. Hoey
George Ford	Black	20	M	September 30, 1938	Scotland	Murder-Robbery	Eunice R. Munn, 44, white	Clyde R. Hoey
Clyde Bowser Jr.	Black	22	M	October 28, 1938	Halifax	Murder	Lizzie Bowser, 20, black (girlfriend)	Clyde R. Hoey
Ed Robinson	Black	33	M	November 18, 1938	Iredell	Rape	Mary Emma Litaker Overcash, 22, white	Clyde R. Hoey
John Howie	Black	29	M	December 2, 1938	Forsyth	Rape-Kidnap	Female, 26, white (Note: Also charged with raping a black woman a month prior.)	Clyde R. Hoey
Baxter Parnell	White	33	M	December 9, 1938	Cabarrus	Murder	Martha Jane Fink, 19, white (sister-in-law)	Clyde R. Hoey
King S. Stovall	Black	26	M	January 20, 1939	Granville	Murder-Robbery	Raleigh T. Moore, 65, white	Clyde R. Hoey
Clarence Bracy	Black	24	M	April 7, 1939	Vance	Murder-Robbery	William Hammit Williamson, 65, white	Clyde R. Hoey
Bat DeJournette	Black	43	M	April 7, 1939	Guilford	Murder	Garland Mangum, 22, white	Clyde R. Hoey
James Dixon	Black	38	M	May 5, 1939	Cabarrus	Murder	Daisy Garland Dixon, 24, black (wife)	Clyde R. Hoey
Edward Mattocks	Black	21	M	May 26, 1939	Onslow	Murder-Robbery	Zion Franklin Matthews, 65, white	Clyde R. Hoey
Dave Burney	Black	47	M	June 9, 1939	Jones	Murder	Maudie Kinsey, 40, black	Clyde R. Hoey
Ed Alston	Black	29	M	June 16, 1939	Durham	Murder-Burglary	Janie Wilkerson, 102, black	Clyde R. Hoey
Bricey Hammonds	Native American	24	M	July 7, 1939	Robeson	Murder	Lacy Brumbles, 36, white (guard)	Clyde R. Hoey
Alfred Caper	Black	23	M	July 7, 1939	Robeson	Murder	John C. McNeill, 27, black	Clyde R. Hoey
James Henderson	Black	21	M	July 7, 1939	New Hanover	Murder-Rape	Stella Cauble Hobbs, 42, white	Clyde R. Hoey
Arthur Morris	Black	25	M	September 1, 1939	Wake	Burglary (Note: Nicknamed the "Grey Mouse" and the "Slippery Eel", Morris was responsible for committing roughly 50 burglaries after escaping from prison, where he was serving a sentence of 30 to 80 years after being convicted of two counts of second degree burglary in 1938. After reviewing the case, Governor Clyde Hoey declined to grant clemency after concluding that at least two of the burglaries to which Morris had admitted his guilt involved attempted rape.)	Dr. William Banks DeWar, 40, white	Clyde R. Hoey
James Godwin	White	20	M	September 22, 1939	Guilford	Murder-Robbery	Donald James Moss, 30, white	Clyde R. Hoey
Charles Fain	Black	26	M	October 6, 1939	Cherokee	Rape-Robbery	Female, 45, white (Note: Raped the 45-year-old woman, a nurse, and stole $90 and two rings from her patient, Mrs. Frank Kilpatrick. Previously convicted of attempting to rape a black woman in Murphy and breaking into the home of a white woman in Blue Ridge.)	Clyde R. Hoey
Willie Richardson	Black	19	M	October 27, 1939	Nash	Burglary (Note: Severely beat and dragged Mrs. Butler out of the residence.)	Frank Edwards and Alice Lindsey Butler, 33 and 28, white (Note: Stole a pocket book and a pack of Chesterfield cigarettes.)	Clyde R. Hoey
Raymond Williams	Black	20	M	November 24, 1939	Sampson	Murder-Robbery	Nathan Reif, 53, white	Clyde R. Hoey
Clarence Rogers	Black	26	M	January 19, 1940	Durham	Murder-Robbery	Howard Moore, 17, white (Note: Also confessed to being involved with the murder of a death row guard.)	Clyde R. Hoey
Glenn Maxwell	Black	50	M	January 19, 1940	Alleghany	Murder	Charlie Burgess Shepherd, 37, white	Clyde R. Hoey
William Young	Black	23	M	February 16, 1940	Hoke	Murder-Burglary	Thomas R. Moore, 33, white	Clyde R. Hoey
Nathaniel Bryant	Black	18	M	February 16, 1940	Hoke	Murder-Burglary	Thomas R. Moore, 33, white	Clyde R. Hoey
Robert Williams	Black	19	M	March 15, 1940	Cumberland	Rape	Lela Bullard, 53, white	Clyde R. Hoey
Zeb Page	Black	29	M	April 5, 1940	Johnston	Rape	Elizabeth Phillingame Stancil, 40, white	Clyde R. Hoey
Simon Gibson	Black	23	M	May 24, 1940	New Hanover	Rape	Gladys Barnes, 49, white	Clyde R. Hoey
Charlie Hopkins	Black	63	M	June 14, 1940	Rutherford	Murder	Roy Eugene Watkins, 29, white (police officer)	Clyde R. Hoey
Lee Flynn	White	44	M	June 28, 1940	McDowell	Murder	Mae Davis Flynn, 37, white (wife)	Clyde R. Hoey
Zedekiel Smith	Black	29	M	December 6, 1940	Sampson	Murder-Burglary	William R. Daniel, 62, white	Clyde R. Hoey
Dollie Hudson	Black	27	M	April 18, 1941	Northampton	Murder	Hampton Wilfred Elliott, 50, white	J. Melville Broughton
Sylvester Woodard	Black	30	M	May 2, 1941	Wayne	Murder	Lillie O. Townsend, 24, black (girlfriend)	J. Melville Broughton
James Shaw	Black	21	M	May 23, 1941	Columbus	Murder	James Oliver Freeman, 28, black	J. Melville Broughton
Fleet Wall	Black	33	M	June 6, 1941	Anson	Murder	Laura Mae Ingram Wall, 27, black (wife)	J. Melville Broughton
Noah Cureton	Black	51	M	June 13, 1941	Mecklenburg	Murder	John William Henniken, 30, black	J. Melville Broughton
Hubert Cash	White	40	M	August 22, 1941	Durham	Murder	Mary Ruth Copley Cash, 30, white (wife)	J. Melville Broughton
Tom Melvin	Black	42	M	September 5, 1941	Wayne	Murder	Gilbert Irby Holmes, 42, white	J. Melville Broughton
George Peele	Black	20	M	October 10, 1941	Bertie	Murder-Robbery	Edward Watson Gray, 77, white	J. Melville Broughton
Luther Morrow	Black	26	M	December 12, 1941	Union	Murder	Lottie Belle Morrow, 27, black (wife)	J. Melville Broughton
Roland Wescott	White	21	M	January 9, 1942	New Hanover	Murder	Mildred Frances Lee, 17, white (fiancée)	J. Melville Broughton
Roy Sturdivant	Black	29	M	February 13, 1942	Bladen	Murder	Ollie Mae Sturdivant, 26, black (wife)	J. Melville Broughton
Arthur Gibson	Black	32	M	August 7, 1942	Buncombe	Rape	Jean Ann Robinson, 6, black (Note: Serial rapist, believed to have similarly attacked "a number of small black girls" in Asheville.)	J. Melville Broughton
Walter Smith	White	63	M	August 21, 1942	Wayne	Murder	Alfonzo P. Price, 47, white	J. Melville Broughton
Herman Allen	White	35	M	October 30, 1942	Johnston	Murder	Three people, white (Note: William Raynor (35), Grady Lee (28, brother-in-law), and Ruth Mae Lee Allen (26, wife). Previously convicted of second degree murder for murdering Rev. Henry Minson Hodges, 50, after he caught Hodges sleeping with his first wife.)	J. Melville Broughton
Otis Harris	Black	17	M	October 30, 1942	Bertie	Rape	Arlene Warren, 26, white	J. Melville Broughton
William Long	Black	31	M	November 31, 1942	Pitt	Murder	Nannie Pearl Long and Nannie Powell, 25 and 44, black (wife and her aunt)	J. Melville Broughton
Rosanna Phillips	Black	25	F	January 1, 1943	Durham	Murder-Robbery	Harry F. Watkins, 64, white	J. Melville Broughton
Daniel Phillips	Black	29	M	January 1, 1943	Durham	Murder-Robbery	Harry F. Watkins, 64, white	J. Melville Broughton
Sam Hairston	Black	22	M	January 29, 1943	Forsyth	Rape-Burglary	Female, 52, white	J. Melville Broughton
Palmer Meares	White	35	M	February 19, 1943	Robeson	Murder	George E. Allen, 63, white (uncle-in-law)	J. Melville Broughton
John Lee	Black	20	M	April 16, 1943	Camden	Rape-Burglary	Doris Turner McPherson, 20, white	J. Melville Broughton
Lewis Moody	Black	29	M	May 21, 1943	Northampton	Murder	John Arthur Kee, 30, black	J. Melville Broughton
Bill Bryant	White	39	M	June 4, 1943	McDowell	Murder-Robbery	Joseph Reid McNeeley, 75, white	J. Melville Broughton
Harvey Hunt	Native American	21	M	June 4, 1943	Robeson	Rape-Kidnap	Eldora Hinson Eason, 27, white	J. Melville Broughton
Purcell Smith	Native American	22	M	June 4, 1943	Robeson	Rape-Kidnap	Eldora Hinson Eason, 27, white	J. Melville Broughton
James Utley	Black	24	M	June 18, 1943	Montgomery	Murder	J. T. Collins and Carrie Lee Collins Utley, 22 and 24, black (brother-in-law and wife)	J. Melville Broughton
William Poole	Black	29	M	October 8, 1943	Pasquotank	Murder	Andrew Jackson Sawyer, 19, white	J. Melville Broughton
Willie Smith	Black	47	M	October 29, 1943	Warren	Murder-Robbery	Spencer Vernon Powell, 50, white	J. Melville Broughton
John Redfern	Black	40	M	November 26, 1943	Wake	Murder	Zedrick Sturdivant, 28, black	J. Melville Broughton
Clyde Grass	White	31	M	December 10, 1943	Cabarrus	Murder	Annie Lee Godwin Stafford and William Alexander Godwin, 18 and 52, white (sister- and father-in-law)	J. Melville Broughton
Alex Harris	White	48	M	January 28, 1944	Hoke	Murder	Nellie Thrower Bill, 52, white (Note: Also murdered her son, 24-year-old Eugene Bill, and daughter, 35-year-old Estelle Bill Watson.)	J. Melville Broughton
Andrew Farrell	White	25	M	February 18, 1944	Durham	Rape (Note: Statutory rape.)	Female, 8, white (stepdaughter)	J. Melville Broughton
Waymon Grainger	Black	31	M	February 25, 1944	Columbus	Murder	Harry Vance Fipps, 26, white	J. Melville Broughton
James Taylor	Black	48	M	November 3, 1944	Wake	Murder	John Leco Taylor, 58, white (police officer)	J. Melville Broughton
Charles Alexander	Black	24	M	November 17, 1944	Halifax	Rape (Note: Statutory rape.)	Female, 9, black	J. Melville Broughton
George Brooks	Black	20	M	November 24, 1944	Mecklenburg	Rape-Burglary-Kidnap	Female, 33, white	J. Melville Broughton
James Buchanan	Black	19	M	November 24, 1944	Mecklenburg	Rape-Burglary-Kidnap	Female, 33, white	J. Melville Broughton
Bessie Williams	Black	20	F	December 29, 1944	Mecklenburg	Murder-Robbery	Mack Minyard, 42, white	J. Melville Broughton
Ralph Thompson	Black	18	M	December 29, 1944	Mecklenburg	Murder-Robbery	Mack Minyard, 42, white	J. Melville Broughton
Melvin Wade	Black	24	M	December 29, 1944	Scotland	Rape	Annie Mae Terry, 9, black	J. Melville Broughton
Elmer Biggs	White	20	M	March 9, 1945	Guilford	Murder-Robbery	Ernest J. Swanson, 67, white	R. Gregg Cherry
John Messer	White	20	M	March 9, 1945	Guilford	Murder-Robbery	Ernest J. Swanson, 67, white	R. Gregg Cherry
William Biggs	White	20	M	March 9, 1945	Guilford	Murder-Robbery	Ernest J. Swanson, 67, white	R. Gregg Cherry
Horris Hill	Black	23	M	May 25, 1945	Jones	Murder	Lillie Mae Horton (lover) and Lula Horton Wilson, 19 and 42, black	R. Gregg Cherry
Lacy McDaniel	Black	34	M	June 8, 1945	Guilford	Rape	Beatrice Collins Harris, 26, white	R. Gregg Cherry
William Jones	Black	53	M	June 22, 1945	Wake	Murder	Annabelle Banks Jones, 40, black (wife)	R. Gregg Cherry
Henry French	Black	35	M	June 22, 1945	Montgomery	Murder	Odessa Ingram LeGrand, 55, black (Note: Also murdered her 42-year-old husband Nathaniel LeGrand.)	R. Gregg Cherry
Burnett Williams	Black	24	M	October 26, 1945	Lee	Rape-Robbery	Kathleen Hall, 20, white	R. Gregg Cherry
Edward Mays	Black	55	M	November 2, 1945	Lee	Murder-Rape	Mattie L. Salmon, 75, white	R. Gregg Cherry
Walter Hightower	Black	32	M	February 15, 1946	Wilkes	Murder (Note: Described as a "homosexual killing.")	Willie Bunker, 20, black (inmate)	R. Gregg Cherry
Thomas Hart	Black	23	M	April 5, 1946	Halifax	Murder	Marjorie Blackman, 24, black (Note: Also convicted of second degree murder for the murder of Algernon Preston Blackman (19, black), Marjorie's brother, during the same incident. Marjorie was pregnant when murdered.)	R. Gregg Cherry
Alligood King	Black	32	M	April 24, 1946	Lenoir	Murder-Rape-Burglary	Jemmie Margarot Hardy, 32, white	R. Gregg Cherry
Gurney Herring	Black	25	M	May 24, 1946	Wayne	Rape-Burglary-Kidnap	Clarinette Brock, 44, black	R. Gregg Cherry
George Walker	Black	23	M	June 21, 1946	Harnett	Rape	Geraldine Butler, 13, white	R. Gregg Cherry
Fab Stewart	Black	42	M	June 28, 1946	Wake	Murder	Sgt. Ernest Jones Jr., 22, black	R. Gregg Cherry
Fred Deaton	White	39	M	June 28, 1946	Gaston	Murder	Walter A. Clark, 40, white	R. Gregg Cherry
Edward W. Floyd	White	39	M	October 25, 1946	Northampton	Murder	Wade A. and Rosa Lee Cook, 61 and 29, white (father- and sister-in-law)	R. Gregg Cherry
Robert Nash	White	44	M	November 1, 1946	Wake	Murder	Margie L. Parker, 22, white	R. Gregg Cherry
Charles Primus Jr.	Black	26	M	November 22, 1946	Wake	Rape-Robbery	Virginia Lipscomb, 23, white	R. Gregg Cherry
Wilbert Johnson	Black	24	M	November 22, 1946	Wake	Rape-Robbery	Virginia Lipscomb, 23, white	R. Gregg Cherry
Herman Matthews	Black	19	M	December 13, 1946	Sampson	Murder-Robbery	John Allison, 53, black	R. Gregg Cherry
Calvin Williams	Black	18	M	December 13, 1946	Sampson	Murder-Robbery	John Allison, 53, black	R. Gregg Cherry
Otis Ragland	Black	30	M	March 14, 1947	Martin	Rape	Florence Williams Moore, 41, white	R. Gregg Cherry
Bennie Montgomery	Black	23	M	March 28, 1947	Union	Murder-Robbery	William Marvin Mangum, 60, white	R. Gregg Cherry
Richard Horton	Black	24	M	April 4, 1947	Wilkes	Murder-Robbery	Francis M. Baker, 26, white	R. Gregg Cherry
Eunice Martin	Black	30	M	April 11, 1947	Forsyth	Murder	Bernice Patterson Martin, 26, black (estranged wife)	R. Gregg Cherry
Ben McLeod	Black	27	M	May 23, 1947	Scotland	Murder	William Kenneth Lowry, 1, Native American (Note: Also killed William's parents, Henry Thomas and Fannie Revels Lowry (39 and 34), and 17-year-old Edward Clifton Koonce, a white friend of the family and overnight guest, before setting their house on fire.)	R. Gregg Cherry
James Farmer	Black	20	M	June 6, 1947	Johnston	Murder-Robbery	Robert Thomas Mitchell, 26, white	R. Gregg Cherry
Albert Sanders	Black	21	M	June 6, 1947	Johnston	Murder-Robbery	Robert Thomas Mitchell, 26, white	R. Gregg Cherry
Roy Kirksey	Black	25	M	June 27, 1947	Columbus	Murder	Agnes Eloise Walker Kirksey, 25, black (wife)	R. Gregg Cherry
Woodrow Brown	Black	26	M	June 27, 1947	Wake	Rape	Stella Edwards, 59, white	R. Gregg Cherry
Moses Artis	Black	42	M	June 27, 1947	Duplin	Murder	George Graham Houston, 46, white	R. Gregg Cherry
Willie Cherry	Black	25	M	October 3, 1947	Northampton	Rape-Burglary	Rachel Edwards Tarrant, 39, white	R. Gregg Cherry
Earl O'Dear	White	24	M	October 3, 1947	Jackson	Murder-Robbery	Jack W. and Margie Lee Maples Hall, 39 and 20, white	R. Gregg Cherry
Robert Messer	White	21	M	October 3, 1947	Jackson	Murder-Robbery	Jack W. and Margie Lee Maples Hall, 39 and 20, white	R. Gregg Cherry
Jethro Lampkins	Black	20	M	October 3, 1947	Mecklenburg	Murder-Robbery	Thomas Franklin McClure, 67, white	R. Gregg Cherry
Richard McCain	Black	21	M	October 3, 1947	Mecklenburg	Murder-Robbery	Thomas Franklin McClure, 67, white	R. Gregg Cherry
Oscar Douglas	Black	40	M	October 10, 1947	Davie	Rape	Hazel Swicegood Foster, 19, white	R. Gregg Cherry
Lester Stanley	Black	27	M	October 31, 1947	Edgecombe	Murder	Shirley Ruffin Stanley, 26, black (wife)	R. Gregg Cherry
Grady Brown	Black	27	M	October 31, 1947	Henderson	Murder	George S. Bowman, 53, white (guard)	R. Gregg Cherry
Thurman Mann	Black	27	M	October 31, 1947	Henderson	Murder	George S. Bowman, 53, white (guard)	R. Gregg Cherry
J. C. Brooks	Black	29	M	October 31, 1947	Henderson	Murder	George S. Bowman, 53, white (guard)	R. Gregg Cherry
Marvin Bell	White	33	M	November 14, 1947	Wilkes	Rape-Kidnap	Peggy Ruth Shore, 15, white	R. Gregg Cherry
Ralph Litteral	White	35	M	November 14, 1947	Wilkes	Rape-Kidnap	Peggy Ruth Shore, 15, white	R. Gregg Cherry
William Little	Black	43	M	November 14, 1947	Wake	Rape	Nannie Rook, 52, white	R. Gregg Cherry
Frank Black	Black	20	M	January 2, 1948	Lenoir	Murder-Robbery	William Lester Corey, 37, white	R. Gregg Cherry
John Breeze	Black	32	M	January 16, 1948	Orange	Murder-Burglary	Agnes Wilkerson, 73, white	R. Gregg Cherry
Buster Hooks	Black	28	M	April 23, 1948	Randolph	Rape	Ora Belle Hughes Bouldin, 38, white	R. Gregg Cherry
Booker Anderson	Black	29	M	April 23, 1948	Pitt	Murder-Arson	Three people, black (Note: His girlfriend Willie Belle Moore Cratch (23) and her two children, Bobbie Jean (6) and Jessie Juanita (11 months). Was on parole for his brother's murder at time of crime.)	R. Gregg Cherry
James Jackson	Black	50	M	May 7, 1948	Burke	Murder-Burglary	David L. Francum, 59, white	R. Gregg Cherry
Henderson Wilson	Black	27	M	June 4, 1948	Davidson	Murder-Robbery	Robert B. Hayes, 66, black	R. Gregg Cherry
George Hammonds	Black	30	M	June 4, 1948	Davidson	Murder-Robbery	Robert B. Hayes, 66, black	R. Gregg Cherry
James West	Black	20	M	November 19, 1948	Duplin	Murder-Robbery	Walter J. Johnson, 63, white	R. Gregg Cherry
James Creech	White	37	M	January 28, 1949	Johnston	Murder	Mattie Woodall Creech, 28, white (wife)	W. Kerr Scott
Emmett Garner	White	42	M	March 18, 1949	Harnett	Murder	Dessie Woodall Garner, 33, white (wife)	W. Kerr Scott
Roy Cockrell	White	42	M	March 25, 1949	Nash	Murder	Geneva Batts Cockrell, 40, white (wife)	W. Kerr Scott
James Lewis	Black	26	M	June 17, 1949	Robeson	Murder	Jadie McMillan Lewis, 31, black (wife)	W. Kerr Scott
Monroe Medlin	Black	23	M	December 9, 1949	Mecklenburg	Murder-Burglary	Virginia Shober Anderson, 68, white	W. Kerr Scott
Audie Brown	Black	27	M	December 9, 1949	Randolph	Murder-Robbery-Kidnap	Edgar Melvin Cain, 37, white	W. Kerr Scott
Allen T. Reid	Black	29	M	December 9, 1949	Wilson	Burglary-Attempted rape	Mr. and Mrs. James Barnes, 67 and 63, white	W. Kerr Scott
Uzelle Jones	Black	35	M	December 16, 1949	Hoke	Murder	Flora Belle Smith Anderson, 30, black	W. Kerr Scott
Leander Jacobs	Native American	29	M	December 30, 1949	Robeson	Murder-Robbery	Martin L. Blackwell, 79, white	W. Kerr Scott
Hector Chavis	Native American	28	M	December 30, 1949	Robeson	Murder-Robbery	Martin L. Blackwell, 79, white	W. Kerr Scott
Lee Heller	Black	47	M	January 6, 1950	Catawba	Murder	Nettie Simmons Heller, 43, black (wife) (Note: Previously served five years for manslaughter after fatally stabbing another black man, Robert Hall, and was suspected in the murders of two other men.)	W. Kerr Scott
Jack Bridges	White	22	M	May 19, 1950	Wake	Murder	Kreston Norris Privett, 21, white	W. Kerr Scott
Claude Shackleford	White	34	M	July 21, 1950	Guilford	Rape	Shirley Ann Hunt, 10, white (Note: On federal parole for shooting a French man while on military duty in Europe when crime was committed.)	W. Kerr Scott
Covey Lamm	White	48	M	November 10, 1950	Wilson	Murder	Mettie Eatman Lamm, 41, white (wife)	W. Kerr Scott
Ernest Lyles	Black	33	M	November 24, 1950	Franklin	Rape	Daisy Etheridge, 63, white	W. Kerr Scott
Curtis Shedd	White	29	M	March 23, 1951	Macon	Murder-Rape	Jo Ann and Johnnie Mae Boyter, 8 and 14, white (Note: Murdered their father, 38-year-old John Boyter, across the state border in Rabun County, Georgia shortly before raping and murdering the two girls.)	W. Kerr Scott
James Hall	White	36	M	March 29, 1951	Jackson	Murder-Rape	Laura Ellen Taylor, 32, white (sister-in-law)	W. Kerr Scott
John Rogers	Black	24	M	April 27, 1951	Sampson	Murder-Rape-Robbery	Eunice S. Kornegay, 48, white	W. Kerr Scott
John Roman	Black	28	M	June 6, 1952	Davidson	Murder-Rape-Burglary	Beulah Miller Hinshaw, 65, white	W. Kerr Scott
Lafayette Miller	Black	22	M	May 1, 1953	Beaufort	Murder	Harvey C. Boyd, 21, white	William B. Umstead
Clyde Brown	Black	22	M	May 29, 1953	Forsyth	Rape	Betty Jane Clifton, 17, white	William B. Umstead
Raleigh Speller	Black	51	M	May 29, 1953	Bertie	Rape	Bessie Holoman Davis, 52, white	William B. Umstead
Bennie Daniels	Black	22	M	November 6, 1953	Pitt	Murder-Robbery	William Benjamin O'Neal Jr., 28, white	William B. Umstead
Lloyd Daniels	Black	22	M	November 6, 1953	Pitt	Murder-Robbery	William Benjamin O'Neal Jr., 28, white	William B. Umstead
Richard Scales	Black	29	M	July 15, 1955	Guilford	Murder-Rape	Bertha and Betty Marie Cook, 30 and 6, white (Note: Bertha raped, Betty Marie murdered.)	Luther H. Hodges
Robert Conner	Black	31	M	July 13, 1956	Forsyth	Murder-Robbery	Langston B. Roberts, 44, black	Luther H. Hodges
Ross McAfee	Black	42	M	November 22, 1957	Alexander	Burglary-Attempted rape (Note: Also attempted to murder the victim. Last execution in the United States for burglary.)	Mr. and Mrs. Walter Glenn Waugh, 24 and 17, white (Note: Also confessed to the murder of Willie M. Milam (76, white) in Georgia in 1956.)	Luther H. Hodges
Julius Bunton	Black	21	M	February 28, 1958	Guilford	Murder-Robbery	Clifford Whitt Phillips, 26, white	Luther H. Hodges
Matthew Bass	Black	43	M	December 5, 1958	Wake	Rape	Sarah K. Mahler, 35, white	Luther H. Hodges
Theodore Boykin	Black	32	M	October 27, 1961	Duplin	Murder-Rape-Burglary	Lena T. Barnes, 57, white	Terry Sanford

== See also ==
- Capital punishment in North Carolina
- Crime in North Carolina
