= Herman Allen =

Executed American serial killer

- Born: David Herman Allen; November 18, 1905; Benson, North Carolina, U.S.
- Died: October 30, 1942 (aged 36); Central Prison, Raleigh, North Carolina, U.S.
- Cause of death: Execution by gas chamber
- Convictions: First degree murder Second degree murder
- Penalty: 20 years imprisonment (1930); Death (1942)

Details
- Victims: 4
- Span of crimes: 1930–1942
- Country: United States
- State: North Carolina
- Date apprehended: January 14, 1942

David Herman Allen (November 18, 1905 – October 30, 1942) was an American serial killer who was convicted for the 1942 triple murder of his family members, a few years after having been released from prison for a prior murder conviction. He was sentenced to death for the later crimes and subsequently executed for them later that same year.

== First murder ==
At the time of the first murder, Allen lived in his hometown of Benson, North Carolina, together with his wife and young child and worked at a local lumberyard. Sometime circa 1929, the family took in a 50-year-old lodger named Handy Minson Hodges, who worked at a local grocery store. The relationship between the Allen family and Hodges was initially cordial, with him spending a lot of time with Mrs. Allen under the pretext of teaching her about the Bible and how to use a typewriter.

On August 6, 1930, Herman was awakened at midnight by the crying of his baby when he noticed that his wife was not in bed. Concerned about her safety, he began to search for her in the backyard until he peered through the window of Hodges' room, where he saw the pair in bed. Distraught by the discovery, he later confronted his wife about her infidelity, and after initially denying it, she admitted to the affair. According to his own account, Allen pondered about the situation until the early morning, when he decided to go to a neighbor's house and borrow a double-barreled shotgun. He then went to Hodges' room and confronted him about it, with Hodges eventually admitting to the affair as well. Upon hearing this, Allen started firing at him, eventually wounding him and causing him to fall down. In spite of pleas to spare his life, Allen shot Hodges in the chest, ultimately killing him.

After the shooting, he traveled to the office of his workplace and told the employees present to send a doctor to his house. Allen then went to the home of a deputy sheriff, where he confessed to the crime and peacefully surrendered. Following his transportation to the county jail, he was interviewed by the sheriffs about the reason for the crime, explaining that he had shot Hodges after learning that he had been sleeping with his wife. As a result, he was brought to trial, found guilty on all counts and sentenced to 20 years imprisonment. However, Allen served only four before being released and returning to his home in Benson.

== Triple murder ==
Upon his return to Benson, Allen remarried to 26-year-old Ruth Mae Lee. For the next several years, the family lived on an undisturbed existence, with Herman and Ruth spending a lot of time tending to their respective parents. However, Allen eventually became suspicious of his wife, believing that she was cheating on him with a neighbor named Cap Raynor. In the early morning of January 15, 1942, he got a 16-gauge shotgun and went to Raynor's house, where he called him to step out on the porch. Upon doing so, Raynor was shot once and fell to the ground, allowing time for Allen to reload and shoot him once more, this time fatally.

He then went to his mother-in-law's house and began firing through the windows, striking his 26-year-old brother-in-law, Grady Lee. Allen then went inside and dragged his wife out by the hair to a barn not far from the house, where he shot her in the back of the head. By that time, neighbors had already alerted authorities to the shootings, who subsequently arrested Allen while he was collecting clothes from his house. While Allen was lodged in a jail in another county, the mortally-wounded Grady was driven to the Johnston County Hospital, where he died two days later.

== Trial, imprisonment and execution ==
Soon after the murders, Allen was arraigned on three counts of first degree murder, with his attorneys announcing that they would plead temporary insanity. Despite his claims that he was drunk and unable to remember what had happened on the night of the murders, Allen was found guilty of the killing Grady Lee and sentenced to death. Allen unsuccessfully attempted to appeal his death sentence, but it was upheld by the North Carolina Supreme Court.

On October 30, 1942, Allen was executed inside the gas chamber in Central Prison, followed shortly after by Otis Harris, a 17-year-old Black teenager convicted of rape. Shortly before being put to death, he continued to claim he was drunk at the time and that the victims had wronged him. His final words were the following: "I am ready to go. I do not dread it. There is a better world for me. I have had a sad life, but that is over now. I have experienced God in my soul. I am glad to leave this world of sin."

== See also ==
- Capital punishment in North Carolina
- List of people executed in North Carolina (pre-1972)
- List of people executed in the United States in 1942
- List of serial killers in the United States
