= List of members of the United States Congress who owned slaves =

This is a list of members of the United States Congress who enslaved Black and Indigenous peoples. Slavery was legal in the United States from its beginning as a nation, having been practiced in North America from early colonial days. More than 1,700 members of Congress have been documented as owning slaves.

== Synopsis ==
At least 1,700 members of Congress enslaved Black and Indigenous peoples at some point in their lives, including 374 senators, at least 1,477 representatives, at least 23 territorial delegates to the U.S. House, at least 6 members of the Congress of the Confederation, and at least 2 members of the Continental Congress.

Slaveowners, whether enslaving Black and Indigenous peoples in office or previously as adults, represented 37 states in either house of Congress, from 1789 to 1923:

- Alabama
- Arkansas
- California
- Connecticut
- Delaware
- Florida
- Georgia
- Illinois
- Indiana
- Iowa
- Kentucky
- Louisiana
- Maine
- Maryland
- Massachusetts
- Michigan
- Mississippi
- Missouri
- New Hampshire
- New Jersey
- New York
- North Carolina
- Ohio
- Oregon
- Pennsylvania
- Rhode Island
- South Carolina
- Tennessee
- Texas
- Virginia
- West Virginia
- Wisconsin

In addition, the following territories and insular areas were represented by contemporary or former slaveowners who were elected as delegates:

- Arkansas Territory
- Florida Territory
- Illinois Territory
- Indiana Territory
- Louisiana Territory
- Michigan Territory
- Mississippi Territory
- Missouri Territory
- New Mexico Territory
- Northwest Territory
- Oregon Territory
- Utah Territory
- Washington Territory
- Wisconsin Territory

Numerous slaveowners, contemporary and former, served in the Continental Congress and the Congress of the Confederation, and slaveowning men constituted at least half of the membership of Congress from 1789 to 1819. The Thirteenth Amendment to the United States Constitution formally abolished slavery in 1865, immediately after the end of the American Civil War. During Reconstruction, the number of former slaveowners declined, but then rose following the end of Reconstruction, followed by a gradual decline in the number of former slaveowners.

William Richardson of Alabama was the last of the continuous line of former slaveholders to serve in Congress, having died in office in 1914. The 64th Congress of 1915–1917 was the first full session to not have any contemporary or former slaveholders in its roster. The last slaveholder to ever hold office in Congress was Rebecca Latimer Felton, who was appointed to represent Georgia in the United States Senate for one day during the 67th Congress. In addition to being the first woman to serve in the Senate, she was the only female slaveowner to ever hold office in Congress.

On January 10, 2022, The Washington Post launched the first known database of documented contemporary or former slaveowners who held office in Congress and its preceding legislatures.

== Senate ==
Senator	Party	State	Term start	Term end	Approximate number of slaves held	While in office?	Notes
John Adair	Democratic-Republican	Kentucky	November 7, 1805	March 1, 1833			
Stephen Adams	Democratic	Mississippi	March 3, 1845	March 2, 1857			
James Lusk Alcorn	Whig, Republican	Mississippi	December 3, 1871	March 2, 1877			
Alexander Outlaw Anderson	Democratic	Tennessee	January 26, 1840	March 2, 1841			
William S. Archer	Democratic-Republican	Virginia	January 17, 1820	March 2, 1847			
John Armstrong Jr.	Democratic-Republican	New York	November 5, 1800	June 29, 1804			
Chester Ashley	Democratic	Arkansas	December 7, 1844	April 28, 1848			
David Rice Atchison	Democratic	Missouri	October 14, 1843	March 3, 1855			
George Edmund Badger	Whig	North Carolina	November 24, 1846	March 2, 1855			
Arthur P. Bagby	Democratic	Alabama	November 23, 1841	June 15, 1848			
Theodorus Bailey	Anti-Administration, Democratic-Republican	New York	December 1, 1793 March 4, 1803	January 15, 1804			
James E. Bailey	Democratic	Tennessee	November 23, 1841	June 15, 1848			
James Barbour	Democratic-Republican (Before 1825), National Republican (1825–1834), Whig (1834–1842)	Virginia	January 1, 1815	March 26, 1825			
John S. Barbour Jr.	Democratic	Virginia	March 3, 1881	May 13, 1892			
Robert Woodward Barnwell	Democratic	South Carolina	June 4, 1850	December 8, 1850	128+	Yes	
Alexander Barrow	Whig	Louisiana	March 3, 1841	December 28, 1846			
William Taylor Barry	Democratic-Republican (Before 1825); Democratic (1828–1835)	Kentucky	March 21, 1809	April 30, 1816			
Richard Bassett	Federalist	Delaware	March 3, 1789	March 2, 1793			
William Brimage Bate	Democratic	Tennessee	March 3, 1887	March 8, 1905			
Martin Waltham Bates	Federalist; Democratic	Delaware	January 13, 1857	March 2, 1859			
James A. Bayard Sr.	Federalist	Delaware	May 14, 1804	March 2, 1813			
James Burnie Beck	Democratic	Kentucky	March 3, 1867	May 2, 1890			
John Bell	Democratic-Republican (1817–1825); Jacksonian (1825–1835); Whig (1835–1854); American (1854–1860); Constitutional Union (1860–1861)	Tennessee	December 2, 1827	March 2, 1859			
Judah P. Benjamin	Whig (before 1856); Democratic (from 1856)	Louisiana	March 3, 1853	February 3, 1861			
Thomas Hart Benton	Democratic-Republican, Jacksonian, Democratic	Missouri	August 9, 1821	March 2, 1855			
John M. Berrien	Democratic (before 1834); Whig (1834–1856)	Georgia	March 3, 1825	May 27, 1852			
George Mortimer Bibb	Democratic	Kentucky	March 3, 1811	March 2, 1835			
William Wyatt Bibb	Democratic-Republican	Georgia	December 1, 1805	November 8, 1816			
Asa Biggs	Democratic	North Carolina	March 3, 1845	May 4, 1858			
John Black	Whig	Mississippi	November 11, 1832	January 21, 1838			
Francis Preston Blair Jr.	Democratic (before 1848, 1866–1875); Free Soil (1848–1854); Republican (1854–1866)	Missouri	March 3, 1857	March 2, 1873			
Jesse Bledsoe	Democratic-Republican	Kentucky	March 3, 1813	January 13, 1815			
Timothy Bloodworth	Democratic-Republican	North Carolina	March 3, 1789	March 2, 1801			
William Blount	Democratic-Republican	Tennessee	August 1, 1796	July 7, 1797			
Elijah Boardman	Democratic-Republican	Connecticut	March 3, 1821	August 17, 1823			
Lewis Vital Bogy	Democratic	Missouri	March 3, 1873	September 19, 1877			
Solon Borland	Democratic	Arkansas	March 29, 1848	April 2, 1853			
Charles Dominique Joseph Bouligny	Democratic-Republican (Before 1828); National Republican (1828–1833)	Louisiana	November 18, 1824	March 2, 1829			
Lemuel Jackson Bowden	Union	Virginia	March 3, 1863	January 1, 1864			
William Bradford	Federalist; Pro-Administration	Rhode Island	March 3, 1793	March 2, 1799			
Thomas Bragg	Democratic	North Carolina	March 3, 1859	July 10, 1861			
John Branch	Democratic-Republican (before 1825); Jacksonian (1825–1837); Democratic (1837–1863)	North Carolina	March 3, 1823	March 1, 1833			
John Breckinridge	Democratic-Republican	Kentucky	March 3, 1801	August 6, 1805			
John Cabell Breckinridge	Democratic	Kentucky	March 3, 1851	December 3, 1861	>5		Later became vice president. Breckinridge defended states' rights in regards to slavery and defended the Fugitive Slave Act of 1850. He also supported manumission and African colonization. He joined the Confederacy as a general and was expelled from Congress.
Richard Brent	Democratic-Republican	Virginia	December 6, 1795	December 29, 1814			
Jesse David Bright	Democratic	Indiana	March 3, 1845	February 4, 1862			
Walker Brooke	Democratic	Mississippi	February 18, 1852	March 3, 1853			
Albert Gallatin Brown	Democratic	Mississippi	March 3, 1839	January 13, 1861			
Bedford Brown	Democratic	North Carolina	December 8, 1829	November 10, 1840			
James Brown	Democratic-Republican	Louisiana	February 4, 1813	December 9, 1823			
John Brown	Democratic-Republican	Virginia, Kentucky	March 3, 1789	March 2, 1805			Also served in the House
Joseph Emerson Brown	Whig, Democratic, Republican	Georgia	May 25, 1880	March 2, 1891			
William Gannaway Brownlow	Whig; American; Republican	Tennessee	March 3, 1869	March 2, 1875			
Alexander Buckner	Jacksonian	Missouri	March 3, 1831	June 5, 1833			
William Bellinger Bulloch	Democratic-Republican	Georgia	April 7, 1813	December 5, 1813			
Aaron Burr	Democratic-Republican	New York	March 3, 1791	March 2, 1797	6+	?	Later became vice president. Burr was born into a slaveholding family. He became a slaveholder himself upon his marriage to Theodosia Bartow Prevost, who held slaves from her prior marriage to Jacques Marcus Prevost, and bought a servant named Carlos. Burr personally opposed to slavery, proposing a 1785 bill for immediate emancipation which failed in the New York State Assembly in favor of another bill which required gradual emancipation and was never passed; a later bill for immediate emancipation was passed after Burr returned to the State Assembly in 1799. His son John Pierre Burr became an abolitionist and civil rights activist.
Andrew Pickens Butler	Democratic	South Carolina	December 3, 1846	May 24, 1857			
Pierce Butler	Federalist, Democratic-Republican	South Carolina	March 3, 1789	November 20, 1804			
Donelson Caffery	Democratic	Louisiana	December 30, 1892	March 2, 1901			
John C. Calhoun	Democratic-Republican (before 1828); Democratic (1828, 1839–1850); Nullifier (1828–1839)	South Carolina	November 3, 1811	March 30, 1850			Later became vice president.
Wilkinson Call	Democratic	Florida	March 3, 1879	March 2, 1897			
Johnson Newlon Camden	Democratic	West Virginia	March 3, 1881	March 2, 1895			
Allen Taylor Caperton	Democratic	West Virginia	March 3, 1875	July 25, 1876			
John Snyder Carlile	Union	Virginia	March 3, 1855	March 2, 1865			
Charles Carroll of Carrollton	Federalist	Maryland	March 3, 1789	Nov 29, 1792			
Lewis Cass	Democratic	Michigan	Mar 3, 1845	Mar 3, 1845			
Joseph Williams Chalmers	Democratic	Mississippi	Mar 3, 1845	Mar 2, 1847			
Ezekiel Forman Chambers	National Republican	Maryland	Jan 23, 1826	Mar 2, 1835			
Christopher Grant Champlin	Federalist	Rhode Island	May 14, 1797	Oct 1, 1811			
Robert Milledge Charlton	Democratic	Georgia	May 30, 1852	Mar 2, 1853			
James Chesnut Jr.	Democratic, Conservative Party	South Carolina	Dec 2, 1858	Jul 10, 1861			
William Charles Cole Claiborne	Democratic-Republican	Tennessee, Louisiana	May 14, 1797	Nov 22, 1817			
Clement Claiborne Clay Jr.	Democratic	Alabama	Mar 3, 1853	Jan 20, 1861			
Clement Comer Clay	Democratic	Alabama	Dec 6, 1829	Nov 14, 1841			
Henry Clay	Democratic-Republican (1797–1825); National Republican (1825–1833); Whig (1833–1852)	Kentucky	Dec 28, 1806	Jun 28, 1852			
John Middleton Clayton	Federalist Party (Before 1824) National Republican (Before 1834) Whig (1824–1854) American (1854–1856)	Delaware	Mar 3, 1829	Nov 8, 1856			
Thomas Clayton	Federalist, Whig	Delaware	Dec 3, 1815	Mar 2, 1847			
De Witt Clinton	Democratic-Republican	New York	Feb 8, 1802	Nov 3, 1803			
Thomas Willis Cobb	Democratic-Republican	Georgia	Nov 30, 1817	Mar 2, 1829			
William Cocke	Democratic-Republican	Tennessee	Aug 1, 1796	Mar 2, 1805			
Francis Marion Cockrell	Democratic	Missouri	Mar 3, 1875	Mar 2, 1905			
Richard Coke	Democratic	Texas	Mar 3, 1877	Mar 2, 1895			
John Ewing Colhoun	Democratic-Republican	South Carolina	Mar 3, 1801	Oct 25, 1802			
Alfred Holt Colquitt	Democratic	Georgia	Mar 3, 1853	Mar 25, 1894			
Walter Terry Colquitt	Democratic	Georgia	Mar 3, 1839	Mar 2, 1849			
John Condit	Democratic-Republican	New Jersey	Dec 1, 1799	Nov 3, 1819			
Charles Magill Conrad	Whig	Louisiana	Apr 13, 1842	Aug 16, 1850			
William Harris Crawford	Democratic-Republican (1803–1828) Democratic (1828–1834)	Georgia	Nov 6, 1807	Mar 22, 1813			
John Jordan Crittenden	Democratic-Republican (before 1825); National Republican (1825–1830); Whig (1830–1856); American (1856–1859); Constitutional Union (1859–1861); Union Democratic (1861–1863)	Kentucky	Mar 3, 1817	Mar 2, 1863			
Alfred Cuthbert	Democratic	Georgia	May 23, 1813	Mar 2, 1843			
Tristram Dalton	Pro-Administration	Massachusetts	Mar. 3, 1789	Mar. 2, 1791			
Garrett Davis	Whig, Union Democratic, Democrat	Kentucky	Mar. 3, 1839	Sep. 21, 1872			
Henry Gassaway Davis	Democratic	West Virginia	Mar. 3, 1871	Mar. 2, 1883			
Jefferson Davis	Democratic	Mississippi	Mar. 3, 1845	Jan. 20, 1861			
William Crosby Dawson	States' Rights Party, Whig	Georgia	Dec. 6, 1835	Mar. 2, 1855			
George Robertson Dennis	Democratic	Maryland	Mar. 3, 1873	Mar. 2, 1879			
William Ford De Saussure	Democratic	South Carolina	May. 9, 1852	Mar. 2, 1853			
Jean Noel Destréhan	Democratic-Republican	Louisiana	Sep. 2, 1812	Sep. 30, 1812			
James De Wolf	Democratic-Republican	Rhode Island	Mar. 3, 1821	Oct. 30, 1825			
Archibald Dixon	Whig	Kentucky	Aug. 31, 1852	Mar. 2, 1855			
Henry Dodge	Democratic	Wisconsin	Mar. 3, 1841	Mar. 2, 1857			
Stephen Arnold Douglas	Democratic	Illinois	Mar. 3, 1843	Jun. 2, 1861			
Solomon Weathersbee Downs	Democratic	Louisiana	Mar. 3, 1847	Mar. 2, 1853			
Charles Daniel Drake	Republican	Missouri	Mar. 3, 1867	Dec. 18, 1870			
John Henry Eaton	Democratic-Republican (Before 1828), Democratic (1828–1840), Whig (1840–1856)	Tennessee	Sep. 4, 1818	Mar. 8, 1829			
John Edwards	Anti-Administration	Kentucky	Jun. 17, 1792	Mar. 2, 1795			
Ninian Edwards	Democratic-Republican	Illinois	Dec. 2, 1818	Mar. 3, 1824			
John Elliott	Democratic-Republican	Georgia	Mar. 3, 1819	Mar. 2, 1825			
Franklin Harper Elmore	Democratic	South Carolina	Dec. 9, 1836	May. 28, 1850			
John Wayles Eppes	Democratic-Republican	Virginia	Oct. 16, 1803	Dec. 3, 1819			
George Evans	National Republican, Whig	Maine	Dec. 6, 1829	Mar. 2, 1847			
Josiah James Evans	Democratic	South Carolina	Mar. 3, 1853	May. 5, 1858			
William Lee Davidson Ewing	Democratic	Illinois	Dec. 29, 1835	Mar. 2, 1837			
Rebecca Latimer Felton	Democratic	Georgia	Oct. 2, 1922	Nov. 20, 1922			First woman in the Senate, last slaveholder in the Senate
William Findlay	Democratic-Republican	Pennsylvania	Dec. 9, 1821	Mar. 2, 1827			
Benjamin Fitzpatrick	Democratic	Alabama	Nov. 24, 1848	Jan. 20, 1861			
James Winright Flanagan	Republican	Texas	Mar. 30, 1870	Mar. 2, 1875			
Henry Stuart Foote	Democratic	Mississippi	Mar. 3, 1847	Jan. 7, 1852			
John Forsyth	Democratic-Republican (before 1825) Democratic (1825–1841)	Georgia	May. 23, 1813	Jun. 26, 1834			
Ephraim Hubbard Foster	Whig	Tennessee	Sep. 16, 1838	Mar. 2, 1845			
Jesse Franklin	Democratic-Republican	North Carolina	Dec. 6, 1795	Mar. 2, 1813			
Frederick Frelinghuysen	Federalist	New Jersey	Mar. 3, 1793	Nov. 11, 1796			
Eligius Fromentin	Democratic-Republican	Louisiana	Mar. 3, 1813	Mar. 2, 1819			
William Savin Fulton	Jacksonian, Democratic	Arkansas	Sep. 17, 1836	Aug. 14, 1844			
John Gaillard	Democratic-Republican	South Carolina	Dec. 5, 1804	Feb. 25, 1826			
Augustus Hill Garland	Whig (before 1855) American (1855–1859) Constitutional Union (1859–1860) Democratic (1860–1899)	Arkansas	Mar. 3, 1877	Mar. 5, 1885			
James Zachariah George	Democratic	Mississippi	Mar. 3, 1881	Aug. 13, 1897			
Henry Sheffie Geyer	Whig, Opposition	Missouri	Mar. 3, 1851	Mar. 2, 1857			
Randall Lee Gibson	Democratic	Louisiana	Mar. 4, 1875	Dec. 14, 1892			
William Branch Giles	Democratic-Republican	Virginia	Mar. 3, 1789	Mar. 2, 1815			
Robert Henry Goldsborough	Federalist; Whig	Maryland	May. 20, 1813	Oct. 4, 1836			
George Goldthwaite	Democratic	Alabama	Mar. 3, 1871	Mar. 2, 1877			
James Gordon	Democratic	Mississippi	Dec. 26, 1909	Feb. 21, 1910			
John Brown Gordon	Democratic	Georgia	Mar. 3, 1873	Mar. 2, 1897			
William Alexander Graham	Whig (before 1860) Constitutional Union (1860–1861) Democratic (1861–1865, 1868–1875) National Union (1865–1868)	North Carolina	Nov. 24, 1840	Mar. 2, 1843			
William Grayson	Anti-Administration	Virginia	Mar. 3, 1789	Mar. 11, 1790			
James Stephen Green	Democratic	Missouri	January 12, 1857	Mar. 2, 1861			
Felix Grundy	Democratic-Republican (Before 1825) Democratic (1825–1840)	Tennessee	Nov. 3, 1811	Dec. 18, 1840			
James Guthrie	Democratic	Kentucky	Mar. 3, 1865	Feb. 6, 1868			
William McKendree Gwin	Democratic	Mississippi, California	Mar. 3, 1841	Mar. 2, 1861			
James Henry Hammond	Nullifier (Before 1839) Democratic (1842–1864)	South Carolina	Mar. 3, 1835	Nov. 10, 1860	>300	Yes	Coined "mudsill theory" and popularized the phrase "Cotton is King". Owned several plantations and sexually abused enslaved children.
Wade Hampton III	Democratic	South Carolina	Mar. 3, 1879	Mar. 2, 1891			
Alexander Contee Hanson	Federalist	Maryland	May. 23, 1813	Apr. 22, 1819			
Martin D. Hardin	Democratic-Republican	Kentucky	Nov. 12, 1816	Mar. 2, 1817			
Robert Goodloe Harper	Federalist	South Carolina, Maryland	Dec. 1, 1793	Dec. 5, 1816			
William Harper	Jacksonian	South Carolina	Mar. 7, 1826	Nov. 28, 1826			
Isham Green Harris	Democratic	Tennessee	Mar. 3, 1849	Jul. 7, 1897			
William Henry Harrison	Democratic-Republican (before 1828); Whig (1836–1841)	Ohio	Mar. 3, 1799	May. 19, 1828	11	No (1841)	Harrison inherited several slaves. As the first governor of the Indiana Territory, he unsuccessfully lobbied Congress to legalize slavery in Indiana.
Henry Peter Haun	Democratic	California	Nov. 2, 1859	Mar. 3, 1860			
Benjamin Hawkins	Pro-Administration (1789–1791), Anti-Administration (1791–1795)	North Carolina	Dec. 7, 1789	Mar. 2, 1795			
Arthur Peronneau Hayne	Democratic	South Carolina	May. 10, 1858	Dec. 1, 1858			
Robert Young Hayne	Democratic	South Carolina	Mar. 3, 1823	Dec. 12, 1832			
William Henry Haywood Jr.	Democratic	North Carolina	Mar. 3, 1843	Jul. 24, 1846			
John Hemphill	Democratic	Texas	Mar. 3, 1859	Jul. 10, 1861			
James Pinckney Henderson	Democratic	Texas	Nov. 8, 1857	Jun. 3, 1858			
John Henderson	Whig	Mississippi	Mar. 3, 1839	Mar. 2, 1845			
John Brooks Henderson	Democrat, Union, Republican	Missouri	Jan. 16, 1862	Mar. 2, 1869			
Thomas Holliday Hicks	Democratic (1830–1835) Whig (1835–1854) American (1854–1860) Constitutional Union (1860–1862) Unconditional Union (1862–1865)	Maryland	Dec. 28, 1862	Feb. 13, 1865			
Benjamin Harvey Hill	Democratic, Whig (Before 1855), American (1855–1859), Constitutional Union (1859–1861)	Georgia	Mar. 4, 1875	Aug. 15, 1882			
Joshua Hill	American Party, Republican	Georgia	Mar. 3, 1857	Mar. 2, 1873			
James Hillhouse	Federalist	Connecticut	Oct. 23, 1791	Jun. 9, 1810			
William Hindman	Federalist	Maryland	Oct. 23, 1791	Nov. 18, 1801			
David Holmes	Jacksonian, Democratic-Republican	Virginia, Mississippi	May. 14, 1797	Sep. 24, 1825			
Outerbridge Horsey	Federalist	Delaware	Jan. 11, 1810	Mar. 2, 1821			
George Smith Houston	Democratic	Alabama	Mar. 3, 1841	Dec. 30, 1879			
Samuel Houston	Democratic-Republican (before 1830); Democratic (1846–1854); Know Nothing (1855–1856); Independent (after 1856)	Tennessee, Texas	Nov. 30, 1823	Mar. 2, 1859			
John Eager Howard	Federalist	Maryland	Nov. 20, 1796	Mar. 2, 1803			
Daniel Elliott Huger	Democratic	South Carolina	Mar. 3, 1843	Mar. 2, 1845			
Robert Mercer Taliaferro Hunter	Whig (Before 1844) Democratic (1844–1887)	Virginia	Mar. 3, 1837	Jul. 10, 1861			
William Hunter	Federalist	Rhode Island	Oct. 27, 1811	Mar. 2, 1821			
Eppa Hunton	Democratic	Virginia	Mar. 3, 1873	Mar. 2, 1895			
James Iredell	Democratic	North Carolina	Dec. 14, 1828	Mar. 2, 1831			
Alfred Iverson Sr.	Democratic	Georgia	Mar. 3, 1847	Jan. 27, 1861			
Ralph Izard	Pro-Administration	South Carolina	Mar. 3, 1789	Mar. 2, 1795			
Andrew Jackson	Democratic-Republican (before 1825); Jacksonian (1825–1828); Democratic (1828–1845)	Tennessee	Oct. 6, 1796	Oct. 13, 1825	200	Yes (1829–1837)	Later elected president. Jackson owned many slaves. One controversy during his presidency was his reaction to anti-slavery tracts. During his campaign for the presidency, he faced criticism for being a slave trader. He did not free his slaves in his will.
Spencer Jarnagin	Whig	Tennessee	Oct. 16, 1843	Mar. 2, 1847			
Andrew Johnson	Democratic (c. 1839–1864, 1868–1875); National Union (1864–1868)	Tennessee	Mar. 3, 1843	Jul. 30, 1875	9	No (1865–1869)	Later became vice president and president. Johnson owned a few slaves and was supportive of James K. Polk's slavery policies. As military governor of Tennessee, he convinced Abraham Lincoln to exempt that area from the Emancipation Proclamation. Johnson went on to free all his personal slaves on August 8, 1863. On October 24, 1864, Johnson officially freed all slaves in Tennessee.
Henry Johnson	Democratic-Republican, National Republican, Whig	Louisiana	Jan. 11, 1818	Mar. 2, 1849			
Herschel Vespasian Johnson	Democratic	Georgia	Feb. 3, 1848	Mar. 2, 1849			
Reverdy Johnson	Whig (before 1860); Democratic (1860–1872)	Maryland	Mar. 3, 1845	Jul. 9, 1868			
Richard Mentor Johnson	Democratic-Republican (before 1828); Democratic (after 1828)	Kentucky	Mar. 3, 1807	Mar. 2, 1837			Later became vice president.
Robert Ward Johnson	Democratic	Arkansas	Mar. 3, 1847	Mar. 2, 1861			
Waldo Porter Johnson	Democratic	Missouri	Mar. 16, 1861	Jan. 9, 1862			
William Samuel Johnson	Pro-Administration	Connecticut	Mar. 3, 1789	Mar. 3, 1791			
Josiah Stoddard Johnston	Democratic-Republican	Louisiana	Dec. 2, 1821	May. 18, 1833			
Samuel Johnston	Federalist	North Carolina	Nov. 25, 1789	Mar. 2, 1793			
George Jones	Democratic-Republican	Georgia	Aug. 26, 1807	Nov. 6, 1807			
George Wallace Jones	Democratic, Jacksonian	Michigan, Iowa, Wisconsin	Mar. 3, 1835	Mar. 2, 1859			
James Chamberlain Jones	Whig (until 1854), Democrat (1854–1859)	Tennessee	Mar. 3, 1851	Mar. 2, 1857			
Elias Kent Kane	Jacksonian	Illinois	Mar. 3, 1825	Dec. 11, 1835	5+		
William Kelly	Democratic-Republican	Alabama	Dec. 11, 1822	Mar. 2, 1825			
Anthony Kennedy	Whig, Know Nothing	Maryland	Mar. 3, 1857	Mar. 2, 1863			
Joseph Kent	Whig	Maryland	Nov. 3, 1811	Nov. 23, 1837			
John Leeds Kerr	Whig	Maryland	Dec. 4, 1825	Mar. 2, 1843			
John Pendleton King	Jacksonian	Georgia	Nov. 20, 1833	Oct. 31, 1837			
Rufus King	Federalist	New York	Jul. 15, 1789	Mar. 2, 1825			
William Rufus de Vane King	Democratic-Republican (before 1828), Democratic	Alabama	Mar. 3, 1811	Dec. 19, 1852	~500	Yes	Later became vice president. King developed a large cotton plantation based on slave labor, calling the property "Chestnut Hill". Moving from North Carolina, King and his relatives formed one of Alabama's largest slaveholding families, collectively owning as many as 500 people. King staked a pro-slavery position in Congress.
Lucius Quintus Cincinnatus Lamar	Democratic	Mississippi	Mar. 3, 1857	Mar. 5, 1885			
Joseph Lane	Democratic	Oregon	Mar. 3, 1851	Mar. 2, 1861			
Walter Leake	Democratic-Republican	Mississippi	Dec. 9, 1817	May. 14, 1820			
Richard Henry Lee	Anti-Administration	Virginia	Mar. 3, 1789	Oct. 7, 1792			
Benjamin Watkins Leigh	National Republican	Virginia	Feb. 25, 1834	Jul. 3, 1836			
Dixon Hall Lewis	Democratic	Alabama	Dec. 6, 1829	Oct. 24, 1848			
John Francis Lewis	Republican	Virginia	Jan. 26, 1870	Mar. 2, 1875			
Lewis Fields Linn	Democratic	Missouri	Oct. 24, 1833	Oct. 2, 1843			
Edward Livingston	Democratic-Republican (before 1825) Jacksonian (1825–1836)	New York, Louisiana	Dec. 6, 1795	May. 23, 1831			
Edward Lloyd	Democratic-Republican, Jacksonian	Maryland	Dec. 1, 1805	Jan. 13, 1826	468	Yes	Among those held on this plantation was future abolitionist and diplomat Frederick Douglass.
James Lloyd	Federalist	Maryland	Dec. 7, 1797	Nov. 30, 1800			
Francis Locke Jr.	Democratic-Republican	North Carolina	May. 23, 1813	Dec. 4, 1815			
William Logan	Democratic-Republican	Kentucky	Mar. 3, 1819	May. 27, 1820			
Wilson Lumpkin	Democratic	Georgia	Dec. 3, 1815	Mar. 2, 1841			
Willis Benson Machen	Democratic	Kentucky	Sep. 26, 1872	Mar. 2, 1873			
Samuel Maclay	Democratic-Republican	Pennsylvania	Dec. 6, 1795	Jan. 3, 1809			
Nathaniel Macon	Anti-Administration (Before 1792) Democratic-Republican (1792–1828)	North Carolina	Oct. 23, 1791	Nov. 13, 1828			
William Mahone	Readjuster in alliance with Republicans	Virginia	Mar. 3, 1881	Mar. 2, 1887			
Francis Malbone	Federalist	Rhode Island	Dec. 1, 1793	Jun. 3, 1809			
Stephen Russell Mallory	Democratic	Florida	Mar. 3, 1851	Jan. 20, 1861			
Willie Person Mangum	Democratic (before 1834); Whig (1834–1852); American (1856–1861)	North Carolina	Nov. 30, 1823	Mar. 2, 1853			
Humphrey Marshall	Federalist	Kentucky	Mar. 3, 1795	Mar. 2, 1801			
Alexander Martin	Anti-Administration Party	North Carolina	Mar. 3, 1793	Mar. 2, 1799			
Armistead Thomson Mason	Democratic-Republican	Virginia	Jan. 2, 1816	Mar. 2, 1817			
James Murray Mason	Democratic	Virginia	Mar. 3, 1837	Jul. 10, 1861			
Stevens Thomson Mason	Democratic	Virginia	Nov. 17, 1794	May. 9, 1803			
Samuel Bell Maxey	Democratic	Texas	Mar. 3, 1875	Mar. 2, 1887			
James Bennett McCreary	Democratic	Kentucky	Mar. 3, 1885	Mar. 2, 1909			
Thomas Clay McCreery	Democratic	Kentucky	Feb. 18, 1868	Mar. 2, 1879			
George McDuffie	Democratic	South Carolina	Dec. 2, 1821	Aug. 16, 1846			
John McKinley	Democratic-Republican (Before 1825) Democratic (1828–1852)	Alabama	Nov. 26, 1826	Apr. 21, 1837			
Louis McLane	Federalist (before 1825); Jacksonian (1825–1837); Democratic (1837–1857)	Delaware	Nov. 30, 1817	Apr. 15, 1829			
John Jones McRae	Democratic	Mississippi	Nov. 30, 1851	Jan. 11, 1861			
David Meriwether	Democratic	Kentucky	Jul. 5, 1852	Aug. 31, 1852			
William Duhurst Merrick	Whig	Maryland	Jan. 3, 1838	Mar. 2, 1845			
Augustus Summerfield Merrimon	Democratic	North Carolina	Mar. 3, 1873	Mar. 2, 1879			
Thomas Metcalfe	National Republican, Whig	Kentucky	Dec. 5, 1819	Mar. 2, 1849			
John Milledge	Democratic-Republican	Georgia	Oct. 23, 1791	Nov. 13, 1809			
Homer Virgil Milton Miller	Democratic	Georgia	Feb. 23, 1871	Mar. 2, 1871			
Stephen Decatur Miller	Nullifier	South Carolina	Dec. 3, 1815	Mar. 1, 1833			
Roger Quarles Mills	Democratic	Texas	Mar. 3, 1873	Mar. 2, 1899			
Charles Burton Mitchel	Democratic	Arkansas	Mar. 3, 1861	Jul. 10, 1861			
Stephen Mix Mitchell	Pro-Administration	Connecticut	Dec. 1, 1793	Mar. 2, 1795			
Samuel Latham Mitchill	Democratic-Republican	New York	Dec. 6, 1801	Mar. 2, 1813			
James Monroe	Democratic-Republican	Virginia	Nov. 8, 1790	May. 26, 1794	75	Yes (1817–1825)	Later elected president. Like Thomas Jefferson, Monroe condemned the institution of slavery as evil and advocated its gradual end, but still owned many slaves throughout his entire adult life, freeing only one of them in his final days. As President, he oversaw the Missouri Compromise, which admitted Missouri to the Union as a slave state in exchange for admitting Maine as a free state and banning slavery above the parallel 36°30′ north. Monroe supported sending freed slaves to the new country of Liberia; its capital, Monrovia, is named after him. See James Monroe for more details.
Andrew Moore	Democratic-Republican	Virginia	Mar. 3, 1789	Mar. 2, 1809			
Gabriel Moore	Democratic-Republican, Jacksonian, National Republican	Alabama	Dec. 2, 1821	Mar. 2, 1837			
James Turner Morehead	National Republican, Whig	Kentucky	Mar. 3, 1841	Mar. 2, 1847			
John Tyler Morgan	Democratic	Alabama	Mar. 3, 1877	Jun. 10, 1907			
Robert Morris	Federalist	Pennsylvania	Mar. 3, 1789	Mar. 2, 1795			
Jackson Morton	Whig	Florida	Mar. 3, 1849	Mar. 2, 1855			
Alexandre Mouton	Democratic	Louisiana	Jan. 11, 1837	Feb. 28, 1842			
John Peter Gabriel Muhlenberg	Democratic-Republican	Pennsylvania	Mar. 3, 1789	Jun. 29, 1801			
Arnold Naudain	Whig	Delaware	Jan. 6, 1830	Jun. 15, 1836			
Robert Carter Nicholas	Democratic	Louisiana	Jan. 12, 1836	Mar. 2, 1841			
Wilson Cary Nicholas	Democratic-Republican	Virginia	Dec. 4, 1799	Nov. 26, 1809			
Alfred Osborn Pope Nicholson	Democratic	Tennessee	Dec. 24, 1840	Jul. 10, 1861			
William North	Federalist	New York	May. 4, 1798	Aug. 16, 1798			
Thomas Manson Norwood	Democratic	Georgia	Nov. 13, 1871	Mar. 3, 1889			
Aaron Ogden	Federalist	New Jersey	Feb. 27, 1801	Mar. 2, 1803			
Richard Elliott Parker	Democratic	Virginia	Dec. 11, 1836	Mar. 12, 1837			
David Trotter Patterson	Democratic	Tennessee	Jul. 27, 1866	Mar. 2, 1869			
James Alfred Pearce	Whig, Democrat	Maryland	Dec. 6, 1835	Dec. 19, 1862			
Isaac Samuels Pennybacker	Democratic	Virginia	Mar. 3, 1837	Jan. 11, 1847			
Edmund Winston Pettus	Democratic	Alabama	Mar. 3, 1897	Jul. 26, 1907			
Israel Pickens	Democratic	North Carolina, Alabama	Nov. 3, 1811	Nov. 26, 1826			
Charles Pinckney	Federalist, Democratic-Republican	South Carolina	Dec. 5, 1798	Mar. 2, 1821			
William Pinkney	Democratic-Republican	Maryland	Oct. 23, 1791	Feb. 24, 1822			
James Pleasants	Democratic-Republican	Virginia	Nov. 3, 1811	Dec. 14, 1822			
George Poindexter	Democratic-Republican (before 1825); Jacksonian (1825–1832); National Republican (1832–1834); Democratic (1834–1853)	Mississippi	Oct. 25, 1807	Mar. 2, 1835			
Trusten Polk	Democratic	Missouri	Mar. 3, 1857	Jan. 9, 1862			
John Pool	Republican	North Carolina	Jul. 16, 1868	Mar. 2, 1873			
John Pope	Democratic-Republican (as Senator); Democratic (as Governor); Whig/Independent (as Representative)	Kentucky	Mar. 3, 1807	Mar. 2, 1843			
Alexander Porter	National Republican, Whig	Louisiana	Dec. 18, 1833	Jan. 4, 1837			
Thomas Posey	Democratic-Republican	Louisiana	Oct. 7, 1812	Feb. 3, 1813			
Samuel John Potter	Democratic-Republican	Rhode Island	Mar. 3, 1803	Oct. 13, 1804			
Richard Potts	Pro-Administration	Maryland	Jan. 9, 1793	Oct. 23, 1796			
Lazarus Whitehead Powell	Democratic	Kentucky	Mar. 3, 1859	Mar. 2, 1865			
Thomas George Pratt	Whig, Democrat	Maryland	Jan. 11, 1850	Mar. 2, 1857			
William Campbell Preston	Nullifier, Whig	South Carolina	Nov. 25, 1833	Nov. 28, 1842			
Samuel Price	Democratic	West Virginia	Aug. 25, 1876	Jan. 25, 1877			
Luke Pryor	Democratic	Alabama	Jan. 6, 1880	Mar. 3, 1885			
James Lawrence Pugh	Democratic	Alabama	Mar. 3, 1859	Mar. 2, 1897			
John Randolph	Democratic-Republican	Virginia	Dec. 1, 1799	May. 23, 1833			
Matt Whitaker Ransom	Democratic	North Carolina	Jan. 29, 1872	Mar. 2, 1895			
George Read	Federalist	Delaware	Mar. 3, 1789	Sep. 17, 1793			
Jacob Read	Federalist	South Carolina	Mar. 3, 1795	Mar. 2, 1801			
John Henninger Reagan	Democratic	Texas	Mar. 3, 1857	Jun. 9, 1891			
Philip Reed	Democratic-Republican	Maryland	Nov. 24, 1806	Mar. 2, 1823			
Thomas Buck Reed	Jacksonian	Mississippi	Jan. 27, 1826	Nov. 25, 1829			
David Settle Reid	Democratic	North Carolina	Mar. 3, 1843	Mar. 2, 1859			
Robert Barnwell Rhett	Democratic	South Carolina	Mar. 3, 1837	May. 6, 1852			
George Read Riddle	Democratic	Delaware	Mar. 3, 1851	Mar. 28, 1867			
Henry Moore Ridgely	Federalist Party, Jacksonian	Delaware	Nov. 3, 1811	Mar. 2, 1829			
William Cabell Rives	Democratic, Whig	Virginia	Nov. 30, 1823	Mar. 2, 1845			
William Henry Roane	Democratic-Republican, Democratic	Virginia	Dec. 3, 1815	Mar. 2, 1841			
Thomas James Robertson	Republican	South Carolina	Jul. 21, 1868	Mar. 2, 1877			
Daniel Rodney	Federalist	Delaware	Dec. 1, 1822	Jan. 11, 1827			
John Rowan	Democratic-Republican, Jacksonian	Kentucky	Oct. 25, 1807	Mar. 2, 1831			
Thomas Jefferson Rusk	Democratic	Texas	Feb. 20, 1846	Jul. 28, 1857			
John Rutherfurd	Federalist	New Jersey	Mar. 3, 1791	Nov. 25, 1798			
Willard Saulsbury Sr.	Democratic	Delaware	Mar. 3, 1859	Mar. 2, 1871			
James Schureman	Federalist	New Jersey	Mar. 3, 1789	Mar. 2, 1815			
Philip John Schuyler	Pro-Administration, Federalist	New York	Mar. 3, 1789	Jan. 2, 1798			
William King Sebastian	Democratic	Arkansas	May. 11, 1848	Jul. 10, 1861			
Theodore Sedgwick	Federalist (1795–1813) Pro-Administration (before 1795)	Massachusetts	Mar. 3, 1789	Mar. 2, 1801			
James Semple	Democratic	Illinois	Aug. 15, 1843	Mar. 2, 1847			
Ambrose Hundley Sevier	Democratic	Arkansas	Feb. 12, 1828	Mar. 14, 1848			
James Sheafe	Federalist	New Hampshire	Dec. 6, 1799	Jun. 13, 1802			
Daniel Smith	Democratic-Republican	Tennessee	Oct. 5, 1798	Mar. 30, 1809			
John Smith	Democratic-Republican	Ohio	Mar. 31, 1803	Apr. 24, 1808			
William Smith	Democratic-Republican (Before 1825) Democratic (1828–1840)	South Carolina	Dec. 3, 1816	Mar. 2, 1831			
Pierre Soulé	Democratic	Louisiana	Jan. 20, 1847	Apr. 10, 1853			
Samuel Lewis Southard	Democratic-Republican (Before 1825) National Republican (1825–1834) Whig (1834–1842)	New Jersey	Jan. 25, 1821	Jun. 25, 1842			
Jesse Speight	Democratic	North Carolina, Mississippi	Dec. 6, 1829	Apr. 30, 1847			
John Selby Spence	Whig	Maryland	Nov. 30, 1823	Oct. 23, 1840			
Presley Spruance	Whig	Delaware	Mar. 3, 1847	Mar. 2, 1853			
John White Stevenson	Democratic	Kentucky	Mar. 3, 1857	Mar. 2, 1877			
David Stewart	Whig	Maryland	Dec. 5, 1849	Jan. 11, 1850			
Richard Stockton	Federalist	New Jersey	Nov. 11, 1796	Mar. 2, 1815			
Robert Field Stockton	Democratic	New Jersey	Mar. 3, 1851	Jan. 9, 1853			
Montfort Stokes	Democratic-RepublicanDemocratic	North Carolina	Dec. 3, 1816	Mar. 2, 1823			
David Stone	Democratic-Republican	North Carolina	Dec. 1, 1799	Dec. 23, 1814			
Robert Strange	Democratic	North Carolina	Dec. 4, 1836	Nov. 15, 1840			
Thomas Sumter	Democratic-Republican	South Carolina	Mar. 3, 1789	Dec. 15, 1810			
Charles Tait	Democratic-Republican	Georgia	Nov. 26, 1809	Mar. 2, 1819			
Isham Talbot	Democratic-Republican	Kentucky	Feb. 1, 1815	Mar. 2, 1825			
John Taylor	Democratic-Republican	South Carolina	Oct. 25, 1807	Mar. 2, 1817			
John Taylor of Caroline	Democratic-Republican	Virginia	Oct. 17, 1792	Aug. 20, 1824			
Henry Tazewell	Anti-Administration	Virginia	Nov. 17, 1794	Jan. 23, 1799			
Littleton Waller Tazewell	Anti-Administration (before 1792); Democratic-Republican (1792–1825); Jacksonian (1825–1828); Democratic (1828–1860)	Virginia	Dec. 1, 1799	Jul. 15, 1832			
Jesse Burgess Thomas	National Republican, Democratic-Republican	Indiana, Illinois	Oct. 25, 1807	Mar. 2, 1829			
John Burton Thompson	Whig, Know Nothing	Kentucky	Dec. 6, 1840	Mar. 2, 1859			
Buckner Thruston	Democratic-Republican	Kentucky	Mar. 3, 1805	Dec. 17, 1809			
Edward Tiffin	Democratic-Republican	Ohio	Mar. 3, 1807	Mar. 2, 1809			
Gideon Tomlinson	Toleration (1817–1827); Democratic-Republican (1827–1828); National Republican (1828–1834); Whig (1834–1854)	Connecticut	Dec. 5, 1819	Mar. 2, 1837			
Robert Augustus Toombs	Whig (before 1851); Constitutional Union (1851–1853); Democratic (1853–1885)	Georgia	Mar. 3, 1845	Jan. 12, 1861			
James Fisher Trotter	Democratic	Mississippi	Jan. 21, 1838	Jul. 9, 1838			
George Michael Troup	Democratic-Republican, Democratic	Georgia	Oct. 25, 1807	Mar. 2, 1835			
James Turner	Democratic-Republican	North Carolina	Mar. 3, 1805	Nov. 20, 1816			
Hopkins Lacy Turney	Democratic	Tennessee	Sep. 2, 1837	Mar. 2, 1851			
John Tyler	Democratic-Republican (1811–1828); Democratic (1828–1834); Whig (1834–1841); New Democratic-Republican (1844); Independent (1841–1844, 1844–1862)	Virginia	Oct. 31, 1816	Feb. 28, 1836	29	Yes (1841–1845)	Later elected president. Tyler never freed any of his slaves and consistently supported the slaveholder's rights and the expansion of slavery during his time in political office.
Joseph Rogers Underwood	Whig	Kentucky	Dec. 6, 1835	Mar. 2, 1853			
Martin Van Buren	Democratic-Republican (1799–1825); Free Soil (1848–1852); Democratic (1825–1848, 1852–1862)	New York	Mar. 3, 1821	Dec. 19, 1828	1	No (1837–1841)	Later elected vice president and then president. Van Buren's father owned six slaves. The only slave he personally owned, Tom, escaped in 1814. When Tom was found in Massachusetts, Van Buren tentatively agreed to sell him to the finder, but terms were not agreed and Tom remained free. Later in life, Van Buren belonged to the Free Soil Party, which opposed the expansion of slavery into the Western territories without advocating immediate abolition.
Zebulon Baird Vance	Whig/American (pre-Civil War); Conservative Party of NC (c. 1862–1872); Democratic (1872–1894)	North Carolina	Dec. 6, 1858	Apr. 13, 1894			
Nicholas Van Dyke	Federalist	Delaware	Oct. 25, 1807	May. 20, 1826			
Abraham Bedford Venable	Democratic-Republican, Anti-Administration	Virginia	Oct. 23, 1791	Jun. 6, 1804			
George Graham Vest	Democratic	Missouri	Mar. 3, 1879	Mar. 2, 1903			
George Vickers	Democratic	Maryland	Mar. 6, 1868	Mar. 2, 1873			
John Vining	Federalist	Delaware	Mar. 3, 1789	Jan. 18, 1798			
George Augustus Waggaman	Anti-Jacksonian	Louisiana	Nov. 14, 1831	Mar. 2, 1835			
Freeman Walker	Democratic-Republican	Georgia	Nov. 5, 1819	Aug. 7, 1821			
George Walker	Democratic-Republican	Kentucky	Aug. 29, 1814	Jan. 31, 1815			
James David Walker	Democratic	Arkansas	Mar. 3, 1879	Mar. 2, 1885			
John Williams Walker	Democratic-Republican	Alabama	Dec. 13, 1819	Dec. 11, 1822			
Robert John Walker	Democratic	Mississippi	Mar. 3, 1835	Mar. 4, 1845			
Edward Cary Walthall	Democratic	Mississippi	Mar. 8, 1885	Apr. 20, 1898			
Matthias Ward	Democratic	Texas	Sep. 26, 1858	Dec. 4, 1859			
Nicholas Ware	Democratic-Republican	Georgia	Nov. 9, 1821	Sep. 6, 1824			
James Watson	Federalist	New York	Aug. 16, 1798	Mar. 18, 1800			
William Hill Wells	Federalist	Delaware	Jan. 16, 1799	Mar. 2, 1817			
James Diament Westcott Jr.	Democratic	Florida	Jun. 30, 1845	Mar. 2, 1849			
Jesse Wharton	Democratic-Republican	Tennessee	Oct. 25, 1807	Oct. 9, 1815			
Hugh Lawson White	Democratic-Republican (Before 1825) Democratic (1825–1836) Whig (1836–1840)	Tennessee	Oct. 27, 1825	Jan. 12, 1840			
Jenkin Whiteside	Democratic-Republican	Tennessee	Apr. 10, 1809	Oct. 7, 1811			
Washington Curran Whitthorne	Democratic	Tennessee	Mar. 3, 1871	Mar. 2, 1891			
Louis Trezevant Wigfall	Democratic	Texas	Dec. 4, 1859	Jul. 10, 1861			
Waitman Thomas Willey	Whig (1840–1860) Union (1860–1865) Republican (1865–1900)	Virginia, West Virginia	Jul. 8, 1861	Mar. 2, 1871			
John Williams	Democratic-Republican	Tennessee	Oct. 9, 1815	Mar. 2, 1823			
John Stuart Williams	Democratic	Kentucky	Mar. 3, 1879	Mar. 2, 1885			
Thomas Hickman Williams	Democratic	Mississippi	Nov. 11, 1838	Mar. 2, 1839			
Ephraim King Wilson	Democratic	Maryland	Mar. 3, 1873	Feb. 23, 1891			
Robert Wilson	Union	Missouri	Jan. 16, 1862	Nov. 12, 1863			
Thomas Worthington	Democratic-Republican	Ohio	Mar. 31, 1803	Nov. 30, 1814			
Robert Wright	Democratic-Republican	Maryland	Nov. 18, 1801	Mar. 2, 1823			
Richard Montgomery Young	Democratic	Illinois	Mar. 3, 1837	Mar. 2, 1843			
David Levy Yulee	Democratic	Florida	Mar. 3, 1841	Jan. 20, 1861			

== House ==
=== Representatives ===
Representative	Party	State	Term start	Term end	Approximate number of slaves held	While in office?	Notes
James Abercrombie	Whig	Alabama's 2nd district	Mar. 3, 1851	Mar. 2, 1855			
George Madison Adams	Democratic	Kentucky's 8th district, 9th district	Mar. 3, 1867	Mar. 2, 1875			
Green Adams	Whig	Kentucky's 6th district	Mar. 3, 1847	Mar. 2, 1861			
David Wyatt Aiken	Democratic	S.C.	Mar. 4, 1877	Mar. 2, 1887	~ 40		Aiken was a slave owner, and owned the Smith family slave plantation after marrying Miss Smith of Abbeville, which held about 40 slaves.
William Aiken	Democratic	South Carolina's 6th district, 2nd district	Mar. 3, 1851	Mar. 2, 1857	700+		Aiken owned one of the largest rice plantation in the state—Jehossee Island—with over 700 enslaved Blacks on 1,500 acres under cultivation
Thomas Peter Akers	Know Nothing	Missouri's 5th district	Aug. 17, 1856	Mar. 2, 1857			
Nathaniel Albertson	Democratic	Indiana's 1st district	Mar. 3, 1849	Mar. 2, 1851			
Adam Rankin Alexander	Jacksonian Republican	Tennessee's 9th district	Nov. 30, 1823	Mar. 2, 1827			
Armstead Milton Alexander	Democratic	Missouri's 2nd district	Dec. 2, 1883	Mar. 3, 1885			
Evan Shelby Alexander	Democratic-Republican	North Carolina's 10th district	Dec. 1, 1805	Mar. 2, 1809			
Mark Alexander	Democratic-Republican (before 1825), Jacksonian (after 1825)	Virginia's 18th district (1819–1823), 4th district (1823–1833)	Dec. 5, 1819	Mar. 1, 1833			
Nathaniel Alexander	Democratic-Republican	North Carolina's 10th district	Nov. 16, 1803	Oct. 31, 1805			
Julius Caesar Alford	National Republican, Whig	Georgia's at-large district	Jan. 30, 1837	Sep. 30, 1841			
Chilton Allan	Whig	Kentucky's 3rd district (1831–1833), 10th district (1833–1837)	Dec. 4, 1831	Mar. 2, 1837			
John James Allen	National Republican	Virginia's 20th district	Dec. 1, 1833	Mar. 2, 1835			
Robert Allen	Democratic-Republican	Tennessee's 4th district, 5th district	Dec. 5, 1819	Mar. 2, 1827			
Robert Allen	Democratic-Republican	Virginia's 17th district	Dec. 2, 1827	Mar. 1, 1833			
Thomas Allen	Democratic	Missouri's 2nd district	Mar. 3, 1881	Mar. 2, 1883			
Lemuel James Alston	Democratic-Republican	South Carolina's 8th district	Oct. 25, 1807	Mar. 2, 1811			
William Jeffreys Alston	Whig, Democratic	Alabama's 1st district	Mar. 3, 1849	Mar. 2, 1851			
Willis Alston	Federalist, Democratic-Republican, Jacksonian	North Carolina's 2nd district	Dec. 1, 1799	Mar. 2, 1831			
George Washington Anderson	Republican	Missouri's 9th district	Mar. 3, 1865	Mar. 2, 1869			
Josiah McNair Anderson	Whig	Tennessee's 3rd district	Mar. 3, 1849	Mar. 2, 1851			
Lucien Anderson	Whig, Unconditional Union, Republican	Kentucky's 1st district	Mar. 3, 1863	Mar. 3, 1865			While in Congress, Anderson advocated for the emancipation of all slaves and voted for the 13th Amendment to the US Constitution, despite having been a slave-owner, possibly even at the time of his voting for the Amendment.
Richard Clough Anderson Jr.	Democratic-Republican	Kentucky's 8th District	Nov. 30, 1817	Mar. 2, 1821			
Simeon H. Anderson	Whig	Kentucky's 5th district	Mar. 3, 1839	Aug. 10, 1840			
Thomas Lilbourne Anderson	American Party, Independent Democrat, Whig Party	Missouri's 2nd district	Mar. 3, 1857	Mar. 2, 1861			
William Clayton Anderson	American Party, Opposition Party, Union	Kentucky's 4th district	Mar. 3, 1859	Mar. 2, 1861			
Landaff Watson Andrews	Whig	Kentucky's 11th district	Mar. 3, 1839	Mar. 2, 1843			
John Archer	Democratic-Republican	Maryland's 6th district	Dec. 6, 1801	Mar. 2, 1807			
Stevenson Archer	Democratic-Republican	Maryland's 6th district, 7th district	Nov. 3, 1811	Mar. 2, 1821			
Stevenson Archer	Whig; Democratic	Maryland's 2nd district	Mar. 3, 1867	Mar. 2, 1875			
James Armstrong	Pro-Administration	Pennsylvania's at-large district	Dec. 1, 1793	Mar. 2, 1795			
William Armstrong	Democratic-Republican, National Republican, Whig	Virginia's 16th district	Dec. 4, 1825	Mar. 1, 1833			
Samuel Mayes Arnell	Unconditional Union, Republican	Tennessee's 6th district	Jul. 23, 1866	Mar. 2, 1871			
Thomas Dickens Arnold	Whig	Tennessee's 2nd district (1831–1833), 1st district (1841–1843)	Dec. 4, 1831	Mar. 2, 1843			
Archibald Hunter Arrington	Democrat	North Carolina's 6th district, 8th district	Mar. 3, 1841	Mar. 2, 1845			
John Baptista Ashe	Anti-Administration	North Carolina's 3rd district	Mar. 3, 1789	Mar. 1, 1793			
John Baptista Ashe	Whig	Tennessee's 10th district	Mar. 3, 1843	Mar. 2, 1845			
Thomas Samuel Ashe	Democrat	North Carolina's 6th district	Mar. 3, 1873	Mar. 3, 1877			
William Shepperd Ashe	Democratic	North Carolina's 7th district, 3rd district	Mar. 3, 1849	Mar. 2, 1855			
William Henry Ashley	Democratic-Republican	Missouri's at-large district	Dec. 4, 1831	Mar. 2, 1837			
John Durant Ashmore	Democratic	South Carolina's 5th district	Mar. 3, 1859	Dec. 20, 1860			
John DeWitt Clinton Atkins	Democratic	Tennessee's 9th district, 7th district, 8th district	Mar. 3, 1857	Mar. 2, 1883			
Archibald Atkinson	Democratic	Virginia's 1st district	Mar. 3, 1843	Mar. 2, 1849			
Archibald Austin	Democratic-Republican	Virginia's 16th district	Nov. 30, 1817	Mar. 2, 1819			
Thomas Hamlet Averett	Democratic	Virginia's 3rd district	Mar. 3, 1849	Mar. 2, 1853			
William Tecumsah Avery	Democratic	Tennessee's 10th district	Mar. 3, 1857	Mar. 2, 1861			
George Baer Jr.	Federalist	Maryland's 4th district	May. 14, 1797	Mar. 2, 1817			
David Jackson Bailey	Democratic	Georgia's 3rd district	Mar. 3, 1851	Mar. 2, 1855			
William Lee Ball	Democratic-Republican	Virginia's 9th district, 13th district	Nov. 30, 1817	Feb. 28, 1824			
John Goff Ballentine	Democratic	Tennessee's 7th district	Dec. 2, 1883	Mar. 2, 1887			
Linn Banks	Democratic	Virginia's 13th district	Apr. 27, 1838	Dec. 5, 1841	>40	Yes	Banks owned 45 slaves in Madison County in 1820, and more than 40 slaves in 1840
John Strode Barbour	Jacksonian Democrat	Virginia's 15th district	Nov. 30, 1823	Mar. 1, 1833			
Philip Pendleton Barbour	Democratic-Republican (Before 1825) Democratic (1828–1841)	Virginia's 11th district	May. 23, 1813	Oct. 14, 1830	54	Yes	
Ethelbert Barksdale	Democratic	Mississippi's 7th district	Dec. 2, 1883	Mar. 2, 1887			
William Barksdale	Democratic	Mississippi's at-large district, 3rd district	Mar. 3, 1853	Jan. 11, 1861			
William Barnett	Democratic-Republican	Georgia's at large district	Nov. 3, 1811	Mar. 2, 1815			
John Barney	National Republican	Maryland's 5th district	Dec. 4, 1825	Mar. 2, 1829			
Robert Barnwell	Pro-Administration	South Carolina's 2nd district	Oct. 23, 1791	Mar. 1, 1793			
John Richard Barret	Democratic	Missouri's 1st district	Mar. 3, 1859	Mar. 2, 1861			
Daniel Laurens Barringer	National Republican, Whig, Jacksonian Democrat	North Carolina's 8th district	Dec. 3, 1826	Mar. 2, 1835			
Daniel Moreau Barringer	Whig; Democratic	North Carolina's 2nd district (1843–1847) 3rd district (1847–1849)	Mar. 3, 1843	Mar. 2, 1849			
Washington Barrow	Whig	Tennessee's 8th district	Mar. 3, 1847	Mar. 2, 1849			
William Taylor Sullivan Barry	Democratic	Mississippi's 2nd district	Mar. 3, 1853	Mar. 2, 1855			
Richard Walker Barton	Whig	Virginia's 15th district	Mar. 3, 1841	Mar. 2, 1843			
Burwell Bassett	Democratic-Republican, Jacksonian Democrat	Virginia's 12th district, 13th district	Dec. 1, 1805	Mar. 2, 1829	127	Yes	In the 1830 federal census, Bassett owned 109 enslaved men and women in New Kent County, and 18 in James City County.
Edward Bates	Democratic-Republican (Before 1825) National Republican (1825–1834) Whig (1834–1854) American (1854–1860) Republican (1860–1869)	Missouri's at-large district	Dec. 2, 1827	Mar. 2, 1829		Yes	While Bates is considered by some modern scholars as "generally unsympathetic to the cause of African American freedom," he emancipated all of his slaves and had paid for his last former slave's passage to Liberia by 1851.
Robert Emmett Bledsoe Baylor	Jacksonian	Alabama's 2nd district	Dec. 6, 1829	Mar. 2, 1831	33	Yes	
Thomas Bayly	Federalist	Maryland's 8th district	Nov. 30, 1817	Mar. 2, 1823			
Thomas Henry Bayly	Democratic	Virginia's 7th district, 1st district	May. 5, 1844	Jun. 22, 1856	31	Yes	
Thomas Monteagle Bayly	Federalist	Virginia's 13th district	May. 23, 1813	Mar. 2, 1815			
James Madison Hite Beale	Jacksonian	Virginia's 16th district, 14th district	Dec. 1, 1833	Mar. 2, 1853			
Richard Lee Turberville Beale	Democratic	Virginia's 8th district, 1st district	Mar. 3, 1847	Mar. 2, 1881	38	Yes	
John Beatty	Pro-Administration	New Jersey's at-large district	Mar. 3, 1793	Mar. 2, 1795			
Martin Beaty	National Republican	Kentucky's 4th district	Dec. 1, 1833	Mar. 2, 1835			
Erasmus Williams Beck	Democratic	Georgia's 4th district	Mar. 3, 1871	Mar. 2, 1873			
George Michael Bedinger	Democratic-Republican	Kentucky's 6th district	Oct. 16, 1803	Mar. 2, 1807			While Bedinger inherited several slaves from his brother, he freed the slaves he owned personally when they reached the age of 30, and reportedly offered to pay for their passage to Liberia, though only one accepted. While serving in the Kentucky state senate, he opposed Kentucky becoming a slave state, but was unsuccessful in this effort.
Henry Bedinger	Democratic	Virginia's 10th district	Mar. 3, 1845	Mar. 2, 1849			
Joseph Henry Beeman	Democratic	Mississippi's 4th district	Mar. 3, 1891	Mar. 3, 1893			
Andrew Beirne	Democratic	Virginia's 19th district	Mar. 3, 1837	Mar. 2, 1841			
Hiram Parks Bell	Democratic	Georgia's 9th district	Mar. 3, 1873	Mar. 2, 1879	>2	Yes	According to his autobiographical memoirs, "Men and Things," he owned at least two slaves.
Joshua Fry Bell	Whig	Kentucky's 4th district	Mar. 3, 1845	Mar. 2, 1847	>14	Yes	Bell owned four slaves as of the 1850 census, and 14 as of the 1860 census.
Peter Hansbrough Bell	Democratic	Texas's 2nd district	Mar. 3, 1853	Mar. 2, 1857	>500	Yes	Having grown wealthy and living "in lordly style" from his ownership of over 500 slaves, he was "impoverished" when the Union freed them after the Civil War.
Joseph Bellinger	Democratic-Republican	South Carolina's 4th district	Nov. 30, 1817	Mar. 2, 1819			He owned the "Aeolian Lawn" slave plantation.
James Edwin Belser	Democratic	Alabama's 2nd district	Mar. 3, 1843	Mar. 2, 1845	10->50		
Benjamin Bennet	Democratic-Republican	New Jersey's at-large district	Dec. 3, 1815	Mar. 2, 1819			
Hendley Stone Bennett	Democratic	Mississippi's 2nd district	Mar. 3, 1855	Mar. 2, 1857			
Egbert Benson	Federalist	New York's 3rd district, 2nd district	Mar. 3, 1789	Aug. 1, 1813	2		
Lemuel Benton	Anti-Administration (until 1795), Democratic-Republican (1795 onward)	South Carolina's 3rd district	Dec. 1, 1793	Mar. 2, 1799			
John Teunis Bergen	Jacksonian	New York's 2nd district	Dec. 4, 1831	Mar. 1, 1833			
Lauchlin Bethune	Jacksonian	North Carolina's 7th district	Dec. 4, 1831	Mar. 1, 1833	>38		
Marion Bethune	Republican	Georgia's 3rd district	Dec. 21, 1870	Mar. 2, 1871			
Samuel Rossiter Betts	Democratic-Republican	New York's 7th district	Dec. 3, 1815	Mar. 2, 1817			
John Summerfield Bigby	Republican	Georgia's 3rd district	Mar. 3, 1871	Mar. 2, 1873			
Benjamin Thomas Biggs	Democratic	Delaware's at-large district	Mar. 3, 1869	Mar. 2, 1873			
Marion Biggs	Democratic	California's 2nd district	Mar. 3, 1887	Mar. 2, 1891			
John Bird	Federalist	New York's 6th district	Dec. 1, 1799	Jul. 24, 1801			
Edward Junius Black	Whig, Democratic	Georgia's at-large district	Mar. 3, 1839	Mar. 2, 1845	30–40		
George Robison Black	Democratic	Georgia's 1st district	Mar. 3, 1881	Mar. 2, 1883			
James Augustus Black	Democratic	South Carolina's 1st district	Mar. 3, 1843	Apr. 2, 1848			
William Blackledge	Democratic-Republican	North Carolina's 4th district	Nov. 16, 1803	Mar. 2, 1813	>6		
William Salter Blackledge	Democratic-Republican	North Carolina's 4th district	Dec. 5, 1819	Mar. 2, 1823			
James Gorrall Blair	Liberal Republican, Democratic	Missouri's 8th district	Mar. 3, 1871	Mar. 2, 1873			
John Blair	Jacksonian Republican	Tennessee's 1st district	Nov. 30, 1823	Mar. 2, 1835			
John Blake Jr.	Democratic-Republican	New York's 5th district	Dec. 1, 1805	Mar. 2, 1809			
John Blanchard	Whig	Pennsylvania's 17th district	Mar. 3, 1845	Mar. 2, 1849			
Theodorick Bland		Virginia's 8th district	Mar. 3, 1789	May. 31, 1790			
James Henderson Blount	Democratic	Georgia's 6th district	Mar. 3, 1873	Mar. 3, 1893			
Thomas Blount	Democratic-Republican	North Carolina's 9th district	Dec. 1, 1793	Feb. 6, 1812			
William Grainger Blount	Democratic-Republican	Tennessee's 2nd district	Dec. 3, 1815	Mar. 2, 1819			
Henry Taylor Blow	Union Emancipation, Republican	Missouri's 2nd district	Mar. 3, 1863	Mar. 2, 1867			Despite being raised in a slaveholding household, Taylor Blow funded the freedom suit of Dred Scott, who was previously owned by Taylor Blow's parents, in Dred Scott v. Sandford.
Thomas Stanley Bocock	Democratic	Virginia's 5th district, 4th district	Mar. 3, 1847	Mar. 2, 1861			
Milledge Luke Bonham	Democratic	South Carolina's 4th district	Mar. 3, 1857	Dec. 20, 1860			
George William Booker	Republican, Conservative	Virginia's 4th district	Mar. 3, 1869	Mar. 2, 1871			
Andrew Rechmond Boone	Democratic	Kentucky's 1st district	Mar. 4, 1875	Mar. 2, 1879			
Charles Borland Jr.	Democratic	New York's 6th district	Dec. 1, 1821	Mar. 2, 1823			
Pierre Jean Baptiste Evariste Bossier	Democratic	Louisiana's 4th district	Mar. 3, 1843	Apr. 23, 1844			
Alexander Robinson Boteler	Opposition	Virginia's 8th district	Mar. 3, 1859	Mar. 2, 1861	15		
John Minor Botts	Whig	Virginia's 6th district, 11th district	Mar. 3, 1839	Mar. 2, 1849			
Joseph Bouck	Jacksonian	New York's 12th district	Dec. 4, 1831	Mar. 1, 1833			
James Wood Bouldin	Democratic-Republican	Virginia's 5th district	Mar. 27, 1834	Mar. 2, 1839			
Thomas Tyler Bouldin	Jacksonian	Virginia's 5th district	Dec. 6, 1829	Mar. 2, 1835			
John Henry Bowen	Democratic-Republican	Tennessee's 4th district	May. 23, 1813	Mar. 2, 1815			
Rees Tate Bowen	Democratic	Virginia's 9th district	Mar. 3, 1873	Mar. 2, 1875			
Gustavus Miller Bower	Democratic	Missouri's at-large district	Mar. 3, 1843	Mar. 2, 1845			
Richard Johns Bowie	Whig	Maryland's 1st district	Mar. 3, 1849	Mar. 2, 1853			
Thomas Fielder Bowie	Democratic	Maryland's 6th district	Mar. 3, 1855	Mar. 2, 1859			
Walter Bowie	Democratic-Republican	Maryland's 2nd district	Dec. 6, 1801	Mar. 2, 1805			
James Butler Bowlin	Democratic	Missouri's at-large district, 1st district	Mar. 3, 1843	Mar. 2, 1851			
William Waters Boyce	Democratic	South Carolina's 6th district	Mar. 3, 1853	Dec. 20, 1860			
Adam Boyd	Democratic-Republican	New Jersey's at-large district	Oct. 16, 1803	Mar. 2, 1813			
Alexander Boyd	Federalist	New York's 13th district	May. 23, 1813	Mar. 2, 1815			
Linn Boyd	Jacksonian, Democratic	Kentucky's 1st district	Dec. 6, 1835	Mar. 2, 1855			
Nathaniel Boyden	Whig, Democratic	North Carolina's 2nd district, 6th district	Mar. 3, 1847	Mar. 2, 1869			
John Boyle	Democratic-Republican	Kentucky's 2nd district	Oct. 16, 1803	Mar. 2, 1809			
Reese Bowen Brabson	Whig; Know Nothing (1856) Opposition (1859–1861)	Tennessee's 3rd district	Mar. 3, 1859	Mar. 2, 1861			
Taul Bradford	Democratic	Alabama's 3rd district	Mar. 4, 1875	Mar. 3, 1877			
John Bragg	Democratic	Alabama's 1st district	Mar. 3, 1851	Mar. 2, 1853			
Lawrence O’Bryan Branch	Democratic	North Carolina's 4th district	Mar. 3, 1855	Mar. 2, 1861			
John Bratton	Democratic	South Carolina's 4th district	Dec. 2, 1883	Mar. 3, 1885			
Elliott Muse Braxton	Democratic	Virginia's 7th district	Mar. 3, 1871	Mar. 2, 1873			
Daniel Breck	Whig	Kentucky's 6th district	Mar. 3, 1849	Mar. 2, 1851			
James Breckinridge	Federalist	Virginia's 5th district	May. 21, 1809	Mar. 2, 1817			
James Douglas Breckinridge	Democratic-Republican	Kentucky's 8th district	Dec. 2, 1821	Mar. 2, 1823			
William Campbell Preston Breckinridge	Democratic	Kentucky's 7th district	Mar. 3, 1885	Mar. 3, 1895			
William Leigh Brent	Whig, Democratic-Republican, National Republican	Louisiana's 3rd district	Nov. 30, 1823	Mar. 2, 1829			
Joseph Brevard	Democratic-Republican	South Carolina's 9th district	Dec. 5, 1819	Mar. 2, 1821			
George Washington Bridges	Democratic	Tennessee's 3rd district	Feb. 24, 1863	Mar. 2, 1863			
John Morgan Bright	Democratic	Tennessee's 4th district, 5th district	Mar. 3, 1871	Mar. 2, 1881			
Henry Roelif Brinkerhoff	Democratic	Ohio's 21st district	Mar. 3, 1843	Apr. 29, 1844			
Francis Marion Bristow	Opposition, Whig	Kentucky's 3rd district	Dec. 3, 1854	Mar. 2, 1861			
James Overton Broadhead	Democratic	Missouri's 9th district	Dec. 2, 1883	Mar. 3, 1885			
John Curtis Brodhead	Jacksonian, Democrat	New York's 7th district	Dec. 4, 1831	Mar. 2, 1839			
Isaac Hopkins Bronson	Democratic	New York's 18th district	Mar. 3, 1837	Mar. 2, 1839			
David Brooks	Federalist	New York's 5th district	May. 14, 1797	Mar. 2, 1799			
Preston Smith Brooks	Democratic	South Carolina's 4th district	Mar. 3, 1853	Jan. 26, 1857			
Aaron Venable Brown	Democratic	Tennessee's 10th district, 6th district	Mar. 3, 1839	Mar. 2, 1845			
Elias Brown	Jacksonian, Whig	Maryland's 5th district	Dec. 6, 1829	Mar. 2, 1831			
John Brown	Federalist	Rhode Island's at-large district	Dec. 1, 1799	Mar. 2, 1801			
Milton Brown	Whig	Tennessee's 12th district, 11th district	Mar. 3, 1841	Mar. 2, 1847			
William Brown	Democratic-Republican	Kentucky's 3rd district	Dec. 5, 1819	Mar. 2, 1821			
William Gay Brown	Democratic, Union	Virginia's 15th district and 10th district; West Virginia's 2nd district	Mar. 3, 1845	Mar. 3, 1865			
Guy Morrison Bryan	Democratic	Texas's 2nd district	Mar. 3, 1857	Mar. 2, 1859			
Henry Hunter Bryan	Democratic-Republican	Tennessee's 6th district	Dec. 5, 1819	Mar. 2, 1823			
John Heritage Bryan	National Republican	North Carolina's 4th district	Dec. 4, 1825	Mar. 2, 1829			
Joseph Bryan	Democratic-Republican	Georgia's at-large district	Oct. 16, 1803	Dec. 31, 1805			
Joseph Hunter Bryan	Democratic-Republican	North Carolina's 2nd district	Dec. 3, 1815	Mar. 2, 1819			
Nathan Bryan	Democratic-Republican	North Carolina's 10th district	Dec. 6, 1795	Jun. 3, 1798			
Hugh Buchanan	Democratic	Georgia's 4th district	Mar. 3, 1881	Mar. 3, 1885			
Aylett Hawes Buckner	Democratic	Missouri's 13th district, 7th district	Mar. 3, 1873	Mar. 3, 1885			
Aylette Buckner	Whig	Kentucky's 4th district	Mar. 3, 1847	Mar. 2, 1849			
Richard Aylett Buckner	Adams-Clay Republican, Adams Party	Kentucky's 8th district	Nov. 30, 1823	Mar. 2, 1829			
Robert Malone Bugg	Whig	Tennessee's 7th district	Mar. 3, 1853	Mar. 2, 1855			
John Bull	National Republican	Missouri's at-large district	Dec. 1, 1833	Mar. 2, 1835			
Henry Adams Bullard	National Republican (3rd Dist.) Whig (2nd Dist.)	Louisiana's 3rd district, 2nd district	Dec. 4, 1831	Mar. 2, 1851			
Wingfield Bullock	Democratic-Republican	Kentucky's 8th district	Dec. 2, 1821	Oct. 12, 1821			
Samuel Bunch	Whig	Tennessee's 2nd district	Dec. 1, 1833	Mar. 2, 1837			
Dempsey Burgess	Democratic-Republican	North Carolina's 8th district	Dec. 6, 1795	Mar. 2, 1799			
Aedanus Burke	Anti-Administration	South Carolina's 2nd district	Mar. 3, 1789	Mar. 2, 1791			
James Nelson Burnes	Democratic	Missouri's 4th district	Dec. 2, 1883	Jan. 22, 1889			
Henry Cornelius Burnett	Democratic	Kentucky's 1st district	Mar. 3, 1855	Dec. 2, 1861	>10		
Armistead Burt	Democratic	South Carolina's 5th district	Mar. 3, 1843	Mar. 2, 1853			
Hutchins Gordon Burton	Democratic-Republican	North Carolina's 2nd district	Dec. 2, 1812	Mar. 22, 1824			
William Armisted Burwell	Democratic-Republican	Virginia's 13th & 14th district	Dec. 1, 1805	Feb. 15, 1821	>71		
Roderick Randum Butler	Whig (before Civil War) Republican (after Civil War)	Tennessee's 1st district	Mar. 3, 1867	Mar. 3, 1889			
Sampson Hale Butler	Democratic	South Carolina's 4th district	Mar. 3, 1839	Sep. 26, 1842			
Thomas Butler	Democratic-Republican, Whig, American	Louisiana's at-large district	Nov. 30, 1817	Mar. 2, 1821			
William Butler	Democratic-Republican	South Carolina's 5th district, 2nd district	Dec. 6, 1801	Mar. 2, 1813			
William Butler	Whig	South Carolina's 6th district	Mar. 3, 1841	Mar. 2, 1843			
William Orlando Butler	Democratic	Kentucky's 13th district	Mar. 3, 1839	Mar. 2, 1843			
Jesse Atherton Bynum	Jacksonian, Democratic	North Carolina's 2nd district	Dec. 1, 1833	Mar. 2, 1841			
Edward Carrington Cabell	Whig	Florida's at-large district	Oct. 5, 1845	Mar. 2, 1853			
George Craighead Cabell	Democratic	Virginia's 5th district	Mar. 4, 1875	Mar. 2, 1887			
Samuel Jordan Cabell	Democratic-Republican	Virginia's 14th district	Dec. 6, 1795	Mar. 2, 1803			
Lambert Cadwalader	Federalist	New Jersey's at-large district	Mar. 3, 1789	Mar. 2, 1795			
Daniel Cady	Federalist	New York's 14th district	Dec. 3, 1815	Mar. 2, 1817			
Harry Cage	Jacksonian	Mississippi's at-large district	Dec. 1, 1833	Mar. 2, 1835			
Greene Washington Caldwell	Democratic	North Carolina's 11th district	Mar. 3, 1841	Mar. 2, 1843			
Joseph Pearson Caldwell	Whig	North Carolina's 2nd district	Mar. 3, 1849	Mar. 2, 1853			
Patrick Calhoun Caldwell	Democratic	South Carolina's 9th district	Mar. 3, 1841	Mar. 2, 1843			
William Parker Caldwell	Democratic	Tennessee's 9th district	Mar. 4, 1875	Mar. 2, 1879			
Joseph Calhoun	Democratic-Republican	South Carolina's 6th district	Oct. 25, 1807	Mar. 2, 1811			
Charles Benedict Calvert		Md.	Mar. 3, 1861	Mar. 2, 1863			
Brookins Campbell		Tenn.	Mar. 3, 1853	Dec. 24, 1853			
John Campbell		S.C.	Dec. 6, 1829	Mar. 2, 1845			
John Campbell		Md.	Dec. 6, 1801	Mar. 2, 1811			
John Pierce Campbell Jr.		Ky.	Mar. 3, 1855	Mar. 2, 1857			
Robert Blair Campbell		S.C.	Nov. 30, 1823	Mar. 2, 1837			
Thomas Jefferson Campbell		Tenn.	Mar. 3, 1841	Mar. 2, 1843			
William Bowen Campbell		Tenn.	Mar. 3, 1837	Mar. 2, 1867			
Milton Anthony Candler		Ga.	Mar. 4, 1875	Mar. 2, 1879			
Newton Cannon		Tenn.	May. 23, 1813	Mar. 2, 1823			
Hugh Caperton		Va.	May. 23, 1813	Mar. 2, 1815			
Richard Bennett Carmichael		Md.	Dec. 1, 1833	Mar. 2, 1835			
Thomas Petters Carnes		Ga.	Dec. 1, 1793	Mar. 2, 1795			
Daniel Carroll		Md.	Mar. 3, 1789	Mar. 2, 1791			
James Carroll		Md.	Mar. 3, 1839	Mar. 2, 1841			
Samuel Price Carson		N.C.	Dec. 4, 1825	Mar. 1, 1833			
John Carter		S.C.	Dec. 10, 1822	Mar. 2, 1829			
William Blount Carter	Whig	Tennessee's 1st district	Mar. 3, 1835	Mar. 2, 1841			
Robert Looney Caruthers		Tenn.	Mar. 3, 1841	Mar. 2, 1843			
Samuel Caruthers		Mo.	Mar. 3, 1853	Mar. 2, 1859			
George Cary		Ga.	Nov. 30, 1823	Mar. 2, 1827			
George Booth Cary		Va.	Mar. 3, 1841	Mar. 2, 1843			
Walter Case		N.Y.	Dec. 5, 1819	Mar. 2, 1821			
Levi Casey		S.C.	Oct. 16, 1803	Feb. 2, 1807			
Samuel Lewis Casey		Ky.	Mar. 9, 1862	Mar. 2, 1863			
John Samuels Caskie		Va.	Mar. 3, 1851	Mar. 2, 1859			
James Ronald Chalmers		Miss.	Mar. 4, 1877	Mar. 3, 1885			
John Chambers		Ky.	Nov. 30, 1828	Mar. 2, 1839			
Augustus Alexandria Chapman		Va.	Mar. 3, 1843	Mar. 2, 1847			
John Grant Chapman		Md.	Mar. 3, 1845	Mar. 2, 1849			
Reuben Chapman		Ala.	Dec. 6, 1835	Mar. 2, 1847			
Absalom Harris Chappell		Ga.	Oct. 1, 1843	Mar. 2, 1845			
John Joel Chappell		S.C.	May. 23, 1813	Mar. 2, 1817			
Elijah Webb Chastain		Ga.	Mar. 3, 1851	Mar. 2, 1855			
Richard Cheatham		Tenn.	Mar. 3, 1837	Mar. 2, 1839			
Langdon Cheves		S.C.	May. 21, 1809	Mar. 2, 1815			
Samuel Chilton		Va.	Mar. 3, 1843	Mar. 2, 1845			
Thomas Chilton		Ky.	Jan. 10, 1828	Mar. 2, 1835			
Joseph William Chinn		Va.	Dec. 4, 1831	Mar. 2, 1835			
Thomas Withers Chinn		La.	Feb. 3, 1839	Mar. 2, 1841			
James Stone Chrisman		Ky.	Mar. 3, 1853	Mar. 2, 1855			
Gabriel Christie		Md.	Dec. 1, 1793	Mar. 2, 1801			
William Montgomery Churchwell		Tenn.	Mar. 3, 1851	Mar. 2, 1855			
John Francis Hamtramck Claiborne		Miss.	Dec. 6, 1835	Feb. 4, 1838			
Nathaniel Herbert Claiborne		Va.	Dec. 4, 1825	Mar. 2, 1837			
Thomas Claiborne		Va.	Dec. 1, 1793	Mar. 2, 1805			
Thomas Claiborne		Tenn.	Nov. 30, 1817	Mar. 2, 1819			
John Daniel Clardy		Ky.	Dec. 1, 1895	Mar. 3, 1899			
Abraham Clark		N.J.	Oct. 23, 1791	Sep. 14, 1794			
Christopher Henderson Clark		Va.	Oct. 16, 1803	Jun. 30, 1806			
Henry Selby Clark		N.C.	Mar. 3, 1845	Mar. 2, 1847			
James Clark		Ky.	May. 23, 1813	Mar. 2, 1831			
James West Clark		N.C.	Dec. 3, 1815	Mar. 2, 1817			
John Bullock Clark		Mo.	Dec. 6, 1857	Jul. 12, 1861			
John Bullock Clark Jr.		Mo.	Mar. 3, 1873	Mar. 2, 1883			
Lincoln Clark		Iowa	Mar. 3, 1851	Mar. 2, 1853			
Beverly Leonidas Clarke		Ky.	Mar. 3, 1847	Mar. 2, 1849			
Brutus Junius Clay		Ky.	Mar. 3, 1863	Mar. 3, 1865			
James Brown Clay		Ky.	Mar. 3, 1857	Mar. 2, 1859			
Matthew Clay		Va.	May. 14, 1797	May. 26, 1815			
Augustin Smith Clayton		Ga.	Jan. 20, 1832	Mar. 2, 1835			
Sherrard Clemens		Va.	Dec. 5, 1852	Mar. 2, 1861			
Newton Nash Clements		Ala.	Mar. 17, 1879	Mar. 2, 1881			
David Clendenin		Ohio	May. 23, 1813	Mar. 2, 1817			
Duncan Lamont Clinch		Ga.	Feb. 14, 1844	Mar. 2, 1845			
George Clinton		N.Y.	Oct. 16, 1803	Mar. 2, 1809			
David Clopton		Ala.	Mar. 3, 1859	Jan. 20, 1861			
John Clopton		Va.	Dec. 6, 1795	Sep. 10, 1816			
William Kennedy Clowney		S.C.	Dec. 1, 1833	Mar. 2, 1839			
Howell Cobb		Ga.	Oct. 25, 1807	Jul. 31, 1812			
Howell Cobb	Democratic	Georgia's 6th District	Mar. 3, 1843	Mar. 2, 1857	20	Yes	1850 Census of Slave Inhabitants; 1860 census of Slave Inhabitants
Williamson Robert Winfield Cobb		Ala.	Mar. 3, 1847	Jan. 29, 1861			
James Cochran		N.C.	May. 21, 1809	Mar. 2, 1813			
John Cocke		Tenn.	Dec. 5, 1819	Mar. 2, 1827			
William Michael Cocke	Whig	Tennessee's 2nd district	Mar. 3, 1845	Mar. 2, 1849			
Jeremiah Vardaman Cockrell	Democratic	Texas's 13th district	Mar. 3, 1893	Mar. 2, 1897			
John Coffee	Jacksonian	Georgia's at-large district	Dec. 1, 1833	Mar. 2, 1837			
Richard Coke Jr.	Jacksonian	Virginia's 8th district	Dec. 6, 1829	Mar. 1, 1833			
William Ferguson Colcock		S.C.	Mar. 3, 1849	Mar. 2, 1853			
Cadwallader David Colden		N.Y.	Dec. 11, 1821	Mar. 2, 1823			
Nicholas Daniel Coleman		Ky.	Dec. 6, 1829	Mar. 2, 1831			
Isaac Coles		Va.	Mar. 3, 1789	Mar. 2, 1797			
Walter Coles		Va.	Mar. 3, 1835	Mar. 2, 1845			
Stephen Alfestus Corker		Ga.	Dec. 21, 1870	Mar. 2, 1871			
Jeremiah Cosden		Md.	Dec. 2, 1821	Mar. 18, 1822			
James Sproull Cothran		S.C.	Mar. 3, 1887	Mar. 2, 1891			
Joseph Stewart Cottman		Md.	Mar. 3, 1851	Mar. 2, 1853			
James La Fayette Cottrell		Ala.	Dec. 6, 1846	Mar. 2, 1847			
Leonard Covington		Md.	Dec. 1, 1805	Mar. 2, 1807			
Leander Martin Cox		Ky.	Mar. 3, 1853	Mar. 2, 1857			
William Ruffin Cox		N.C.	Mar. 3, 1881	Mar. 2, 1887			
George Whitfield Crabb		Ala.	Sep. 3, 1838	Mar. 2, 1841			
Jeremiah Crabb		Md.	Dec. 6, 1795	Dec. 31, 1795			
Hector Craig		N.Y.	Nov. 30, 1823	Jul. 11, 1830			
James Craig		Mo.	Mar. 3, 1857	Mar. 2, 1861			
Robert Craig		Va.	Dec. 6, 1829	Mar. 2, 1841			
Francis Burton Craige		N.C.	Mar. 3, 1853	Mar. 2, 1861			
William Craik		Md.	Dec. 6, 1795	Mar. 2, 1801			
Jordan Edgar Cravens		Ark.	Mar. 4, 1877	Mar. 2, 1883			
George Walker Crawford		Ga.	Jan. 6, 1843	Mar. 2, 1843			
Joel Crawford		Ga.	Nov. 30, 1817	Mar. 2, 1821			
Martin Jenkins Crawford		Ga.	Mar. 3, 1855	Jan. 22, 1861			
William Crawford		Pa.	May. 21, 1809	Mar. 2, 1817			
John Woodland Crisfield		Md.	Mar. 3, 1847	Mar. 2, 1863			
Henry Crist		Ky.	May. 21, 1809	Mar. 2, 1811			
John Critcher		Va.	Mar. 3, 1871	Mar. 2, 1873			
Thomas Theodore Crittenden		Mo.	Mar. 3, 1873	Mar. 2, 1879			
Jacob Crocheron		N.Y.	Dec. 6, 1829	Mar. 2, 1831			
David Crockett		Tenn.	Dec. 2, 1827	Mar. 2, 1835			
Edward Cross		Ark.	Mar. 3, 1839	Mar. 2, 1845			
Edward Crossland		Ky.	Mar. 3, 1871	Mar. 2, 1875			
Edward Crouch		Pa.	May. 23, 1813	Mar. 2, 1815			
John Crowell		Ala.	Nov. 15, 1818	Mar. 2, 1821			
Thomas Croxton		Va.	Mar. 3, 1885	Mar. 2, 1887			
John Hervey Crozier		Tenn.	Mar. 3, 1845	Mar. 2, 1849			
Josiah Crudup		N.C.	Dec. 2, 1821	Mar. 2, 1823			
Daniel Cruger		N.Y.	Nov. 30, 1817	Mar. 2, 1819			
William Crutchfield		Tenn.	Mar. 3, 1873	Mar. 2, 1875			
William Constantine Culbertson		Pa.	Mar. 3, 1889	Mar. 2, 1891			
Thomas Culbreth		Md.	Nov. 30, 1817	Mar. 2, 1821			
Elisha Dickerson Cullen	American	Delaware's at-large district	Mar. 3, 1855	Mar. 2, 1857			
Alvan Cullom	Democratic	Tennessee's 4th district	Mar. 3, 1843	Mar. 2, 1847			
William Cullom	Whig	Tennessee's 8th district, 4th district	Mar. 3, 1851	Mar. 2, 1855			
John Culpepper	National Republican	North Carolina's 7th district	Oct. 25, 1807	Mar. 2, 1829			
Jabez Lamar Monroe Curry	Democratic	Alabama's 7th district	Mar. 3, 1857	Jan. 20, 1861			
John Alfred Cuthbert	Democratic-Republican	Georgia's at-large district	Dec. 5, 1819	Mar. 2, 1821			
Henry Daniel		Ky.	Dec. 2, 1827	Mar. 1, 1833			
John Reeves Jones Daniel		N.C.	Mar. 3, 1841	Mar. 2, 1853			
Ezra Darby		N.J.	Dec. 1, 1805	Dec. 27, 1808			
John Fletcher Darby		Mo.	Mar. 3, 1851	Mar. 2, 1853			
Edmund Strother Dargan		Ala.	Mar. 3, 1845	Mar. 2, 1847			
Thomas Davenport		Va.	Dec. 4, 1825	Mar. 2, 1835			
Alexander Caldwell Davidson		Ala.	Mar. 3, 1885	Mar. 3, 1889			
Robert Hamilton McWhorta Davidson		Fla.	Mar. 4, 1877	Mar. 2, 1891			
Thomas Green Davidson		La.	Mar. 3, 1855	Mar. 2, 1861			
William Davidson		N.C.	Nov. 30, 1817	Mar. 2, 1821			
Amos Davis		Ky.	Dec. 1, 1833	Mar. 2, 1835			
Henry Winter Davis		Md.	Mar. 3, 1855	Mar. 3, 1865			
Jacob Cunningham Davis		Ill.	Nov. 3, 1856	Mar. 2, 1857			
Joseph Jonathan Davis		N.C.	Mar. 4, 1875	Mar. 2, 1881			
Reuben Davis		Miss.	Mar. 3, 1857	Jan. 11, 1861			
Timothy Davis		Iowa	Mar. 3, 1857	Mar. 2, 1859			
Warren Ransom Davis		S.C.	Dec. 9, 1827	Jan. 28, 1835			
John Bennett Dawson		La.	Mar. 3, 1841	Mar. 2, 1845			
William Johnson Dawson		N.C.	Dec. 1, 1793	Mar. 2, 1795			
Edmund Deberry		N.C.	Dec. 6, 1829	Mar. 2, 1851			
Daniel Coleman De Jarnette		Va.	Mar. 3, 1859	Mar. 2, 1861			
James Dellet		Ala.	Mar. 3, 1839	Mar. 2, 1845			
William Denning		N.Y.	May. 21, 1809	Mar. 2, 1811			
John Dennis		Md.	May. 14, 1797	Mar. 2, 1805			
John Dennis		Md.	Mar. 3, 1837	Mar. 2, 1841			
Littleton Purnell Dennis		Md.	Dec. 1, 1833	Apr. 13, 1834			
Peter Denoyelles		N.Y.	May. 23, 1813	Mar. 2, 1815			
George Dent		Md.	Dec. 1, 1793	Mar. 2, 1801			
William Barton Wade Dent		Ga.	Mar. 3, 1853	Mar. 2, 1855			
Joseph Desha		Ky.	Oct. 25, 1807	Mar. 2, 1819			
Robert Desha		Tenn.	Dec. 2, 1827	Mar. 2, 1831			
Jacob Hasbrouck De Witt		N.Y.	Dec. 5, 1819	Mar. 2, 1821			
George Gibbs Dibrell		Tenn.	Mar. 4, 1875	Mar. 3, 1885			
Samuel Dickens		N.C.	Dec. 3, 1815	Mar. 2, 1817			
David W. Dickinson		Tenn.	Dec. 1, 1833	Mar. 2, 1845			
John Dean Dickinson		N.Y.	Dec. 5, 1819	Mar. 2, 1831			
David Dickson		Miss.	Dec. 30, 1835	Dec. 31, 1835			
Joseph Dickson		N.C.	Dec. 1, 1799	Mar. 2, 1801			
William Dietz		N.Y.	Dec. 4, 1825	Mar. 2, 1827			
Joseph Dixon		N.C.	Dec. 4, 1870	Mar. 2, 1871			
James Cochrane Dobbin		N.C.	Mar. 3, 1845	Mar. 2, 1847			
Alfred Dockery		N.C.	Mar. 3, 1845	Mar. 2, 1853			
Oliver Hart Dockery		N.C.	Jul. 12, 1868	Mar. 2, 1871			
Philip Doddridge		Va.	Jan. 27, 1830	Nov. 18, 1832			
Richard Spaight Donnell		N.C.	Mar. 3, 1847	Mar. 2, 1849			
Clement Dorsey		Md.	Dec. 4, 1825	Mar. 2, 1831			
Beverly Browne Douglas		Va.	Mar. 4, 1875	Mar. 2, 1879			
James Ferguson Dowdell		Ala.	Mar. 3, 1853	Mar. 2, 1859			
William Drayton		S.C.	Dec. 4, 1825	Mar. 1, 1833			
George Coke Dromgoole		Va.	Mar. 3, 1835	Apr. 26, 1847			
Dudley McIver Du Bose		Ga.	Mar. 3, 1871	Mar. 2, 1873			
Edward Bishop Dudley		N.C.	Dec. 13, 1829	Mar. 2, 1831			
Richard Thomas Walker Duke		Va.	Mar. 3, 1869	Mar. 2, 1873			
William Dunbar		La.	Mar. 3, 1853	Mar. 2, 1855			
William Garnett Duncan		Ky.	Mar. 3, 1847	Mar. 2, 1849			
George Washington Dunlap		Ky.	Mar. 3, 1861	Mar. 2, 1863			
William Claiborne Dunlap		Tenn.	Dec. 1, 1833	Mar. 2, 1837			
Poindexter Dunn		Ark.	Mar. 17, 1879	Mar. 3, 1889			
Milton Jameson Durham		Ky.	Mar. 3, 1873	Mar. 2, 1879			
William Pope Duval		Ky.	May. 23, 1813	Mar. 2, 1815			
Gabriel Duvall		Md.	Dec. 1, 1793	Mar. 27, 1796			
Elias Earle		S.C.	Dec. 1, 1805	Mar. 2, 1821			
John Baylis Earle		S.C.	Oct. 16, 1803	Mar. 2, 1805			
Samuel Earle		S.C.	Dec. 6, 1795	Mar. 2, 1797			
Peter Early		Ga.	Dec. 6, 1801	Mar. 2, 1807			
Paul Carrington Edmunds		Va.	Mar. 3, 1889	Mar. 3, 1895			
Henry Alonzo Edmundson		Va.	Mar. 3, 1849	Mar. 2, 1861			
Benjamin Edwards		Md.	Dec. 1, 1793	Mar. 2, 1795			
John Edwards		N.Y.	Mar. 3, 1837	Mar. 2, 1839			
John Cummins Edwards		Mo.	Mar. 3, 1841	Mar. 2, 1843			
Weldon Nathaniel Edwards		N.C.	Dec. 3, 1815	Mar. 2, 1827			
George Ege		Pa.	Dec. 6, 1795	Sep. 30, 1797			
Joseph Eggleston		Va.	May. 14, 1797	Mar. 2, 1801			
Joseph Barton Elam		La.	Mar. 4, 1877	Mar. 2, 1881			
Henry Thomas Ellett		Miss.	Jan. 25, 1847	Mar. 2, 1847			
John Milton Elliott		Ky.	Mar. 3, 1853	Mar. 2, 1859			
William Elliott		S.C.	Mar. 3, 1887	Mar. 2, 1903			
Lucas Conrad Elmendorf		N.Y.	May. 14, 1797	Mar. 2, 1803			
John Ely		N.Y.	Mar. 3, 1839	Mar. 2, 1841			
James Ervin		S.C.	Nov. 30, 1817	Mar. 2, 1821			
Benjamin Estil		Va.	Dec. 4, 1825	Mar. 2, 1827			
Emerson Etheridge		Tenn.	Mar. 3, 1853	Mar. 2, 1861			
David Reid Evans		S.C.	May. 23, 1813	Mar. 2, 1815			
Andrew Ewing		Tenn.	Mar. 3, 1849	Mar. 2, 1851			
Edwin Hickman Ewing		Tenn.	Mar. 3, 1845	Mar. 2, 1847			
Isaac Gray Farlee		N.J.	Mar. 3, 1843	Mar. 2, 1845			
Samuel Farrow		S.C.	May. 23, 1813	Mar. 2, 1815			
Charles James Faulkner		Va., W.Va.	Mar. 3, 1851	Mar. 3, 1877			
Winfield Scott Featherston		Miss.	Mar. 3, 1847	Mar. 2, 1851			
John Myers Felder		S.C.	Dec. 4, 1831	Mar. 2, 1835			
William Harrell Felton		Ga.	Mar. 4, 1875	Mar. 2, 1881			
William Findley		Pa.	Oct. 23, 1791	Mar. 2, 1817			
Jesse Johnson Finley		Fla.	Mar. 4, 1875	Mar. 2, 1883			
Charles Fisher		N.C.	Nov. 30, 1817	Mar. 2, 1841			
George Purnell Fisher		Del.	Mar. 3, 1861	Mar. 2, 1863			
Jonathan Fisk		N.Y.	May. 21, 1809	Mar. 2, 1815			
Samuel McClary Fite		Tenn.	Mar. 4, 1875	Mar. 3, 1877			
William Fitzgerald		Tenn.	Dec. 4, 1831	Mar. 1, 1833			
Thomas Fitzsimons		Pa.	Mar. 3, 1789	Mar. 2, 1795			
William Bennett Fleming		Ga.	Mar. 4, 1877	Mar. 2, 1879			
Thomas Fletcher		Ky.	Dec. 3, 1815	Mar. 2, 1817			
Thomas Stanhope Flournoy		Va.	Mar. 3, 1847	Mar. 2, 1849			
John Floyd		Ga.	Dec. 2, 1827	Mar. 2, 1829			
John Floyd		Va.	Nov. 30, 1817	Mar. 2, 1829			
William Floyd		N.Y.	Mar. 3, 1789	Mar. 2, 1791			
Daniel Munroe Forney		N.C.	Dec. 3, 1815	Dec. 31, 1817			
Peter Forney		N.C.	May. 23, 1813	Mar. 2, 1815			
William Henry Forney		Ala.	Mar. 4, 1875	Mar. 3, 1893			
Uriah Forrest		Md.	Dec. 1, 1793	Nov. 7, 1794			
Tomlinson Fort		Ga.	Dec. 2, 1827	Mar. 2, 1829			
Nathaniel Greene Foster		Ga.	Mar. 3, 1855	Mar. 2, 1857			
John Fowler		Ky.	May. 14, 1797	Mar. 2, 1807			
John Rankin Franklin		Md.	Mar. 3, 1853	Mar. 2, 1855			
Meshack Franklin		N.C.	Oct. 25, 1807	Mar. 2, 1815			
James Crawford Freeman		Ga.	Mar. 3, 1873	Mar. 2, 1875			
John D. Freeman		Miss.	Mar. 3, 1851	Mar. 2, 1853			
Richard French		Ky.	Dec. 6, 1835	Mar. 2, 1849			
David Fullerton		Pa.	Dec. 5, 1819	May. 14, 1820			
Andrew Steele Fulton		Va.	Mar. 3, 1847	Mar. 2, 1849			
John Pollard Gaines		Ky.	Mar. 3, 1847	Mar. 2, 1849			
Nathan Gaither		Ky.	Dec. 6, 1829	Mar. 1, 1833			
George Gale		Md.	Mar. 3, 1789	Mar. 2, 1791			
Levin Gale		Md.	Dec. 2, 1827	Mar. 2, 1829			
Roger Lawson Gamble		Ga.	Dec. 1, 1833	Mar. 2, 1843			
David Shepherd Garland		Va.	May. 21, 1809	Mar. 2, 1811			
James Garland		Va.	Mar. 3, 1835	Mar. 2, 1841			
Rice Garland		La.	Apr. 27, 1834	Jul. 20, 1840			
James Mercer Garnett		Va.	Dec. 1, 1805	Mar. 2, 1809			
Muscoe Russell Hunter Garnett		Va.	Nov. 30, 1856	Mar. 2, 1861			
Robert Selden Garnett		Va.	Nov. 30, 1817	Mar. 2, 1827			
Daniel Greene Garnsey		N.Y.	Dec. 4, 1825	Mar. 2, 1829			
George Tankard Garrison		Va.	Mar. 3, 1881	Mar. 3, 1885			
Nathaniel Garrow		N.Y.	Dec. 2, 1827	Mar. 2, 1829			
William Willis Garth		Ala.	Mar. 4, 1877	Mar. 2, 1879			
Lucius Jeremiah Gartrell		Ga.	Mar. 3, 1857	Jan. 22, 1861			
William Gaston		N.C.	May. 23, 1813	Mar. 2, 1817			
Alfred Moore Gatlin		N.C.	Nov. 30, 1823	Mar. 2, 1825			
Edward James Gay		La.	Mar. 3, 1885	May. 29, 1889			
John Gayle		Ala.	Mar. 3, 1847	Mar. 2, 1849			
James Herbert Gholson		Va.	Dec. 1, 1833	Mar. 2, 1835			
Samuel Jameson Gholson		Miss.	Jan. 6, 1837	Feb. 4, 1838			
Thomas Gholson Jr.		Va.	Oct. 25, 1807	Jul. 3, 1816			
James King Gibson		Va.	Mar. 3, 1869	Mar. 2, 1871			
Ezekiel Gilbert		N.Y.	Dec. 1, 1793	Mar. 2, 1797			
Sylvester Gilbert		Conn.	Nov. 30, 1817	Mar. 2, 1819			
William Fell Giles		Md.	Mar. 3, 1845	Mar. 2, 1847			
James Gillespie	Anti-Administration (1793–1795); Democratic-Republican (1795–1805)	N.C.	Dec. 1, 1793	Jan. 10, 1805	≥30		
Alexander Gillon		S.C.	Dec. 1, 1793	Oct. 5, 1794			
George Rockingham Gilmer		Ga.	Dec. 2, 1821	Mar. 2, 1835			
John Adams Gilmer		N.C.	Mar. 3, 1857	Mar. 2, 1861			
Thomas Walker Gilmer		Va.	Mar. 3, 1841	Feb. 15, 1844			
Joseph Gist		S.C.	Dec. 2, 1821	Mar. 2, 1827			
Thomas Glascock		Ga.	Dec. 6, 1835	Mar. 2, 1839			
Presley Thornton Glass		Tenn.	Mar. 3, 1885	Mar. 3, 1889			
Henry Glen		N.Y.	Dec. 1, 1793	Mar. 2, 1801			
William Leftwich Goggin		Va.	Mar. 3, 1839	Mar. 2, 1849			
Thomas Ruggles Gold		N.Y.	May. 21, 1809	Mar. 2, 1817			
Charles Goldsborough		Md.	Dec. 1, 1805	Mar. 2, 1817			
Jacob Shall Golladay		Ky.	Dec. 4, 1867	Feb. 27, 1870			
John Goode Jr.		Va.	Mar. 4, 1875	Mar. 2, 1881			
Samuel Goode		Va.	Dec. 1, 1799	Mar. 2, 1801			
William Osborne Goode		Va.	Mar. 3, 1841	Jul. 2, 1859			
Elizur Goodrich		Conn.	Dec. 1, 1799	Mar. 2, 1801			
George Washington Gordon		Tenn.	Mar. 3, 1907	Aug. 8, 1911			
James Gordon		N.Y.	Oct. 23, 1791	Mar. 2, 1795			
William Fitzhugh Gordon		Va.	Jan. 24, 1830	Mar. 2, 1835			
James Hamilton Goss		S.C.	Jul. 17, 1868	Mar. 2, 1869			
Theodore Gourdin		S.C.	May. 23, 1813	Mar. 2, 1815			
Andrew Robison Govan		S.C.	Dec. 3, 1822	Mar. 2, 1827			
Samuel Francis Gove		Ga.	Jun. 24, 1868	Mar. 2, 1869			
Amos Phelps Granger		N.Y.	Mar. 3, 1855	Mar. 2, 1859			
Seaton Grantland		Ga.	Dec. 6, 1835	Mar. 2, 1839			
William Jordan Graves		Ky.	Dec. 13, 1835	Mar. 2, 1841			
Edwin Gray		Va.	Dec. 1, 1799	Mar. 2, 1813			
John Cowper Gray		Va.	Nov. 12, 1820	Mar. 2, 1821			
William John Grayson		S.C.	Dec. 1, 1833	Mar. 2, 1837			
Wharton Jackson Green		N.C.	Dec. 2, 1883	Mar. 2, 1887			
Willis Green		Ky.	Mar. 3, 1839	Mar. 2, 1845			
Christopher Greenup		Ky.	Oct. 23, 1791	Mar. 2, 1797			
Alfred Burton Greenwood		Ark.	Mar. 3, 1853	Mar. 2, 1859			
John Greig		N.Y.	May. 20, 1841	Sep. 24, 1841			
Henry Grider		Ky.	Mar. 3, 1843	Sep. 6, 1866			
John King Griffin		S.C.	Dec. 4, 1831	Mar. 2, 1841			
Thomas Griffin		Va.	Oct. 16, 1803	Mar. 2, 1805			
William Barry Grove		N.C.	Oct. 23, 1791	Mar. 2, 1803			
Asa Porter Grover		Ky.	Mar. 3, 1867	Mar. 2, 1869			
Henry Hosford Gurley		La.	Dec. 17, 1823	Mar. 2, 1831			
James Guyon Jr.		N.Y.	Jan. 13, 1820	Mar. 2, 1821			
Richard Wylly Habersham	Whig	Ga.	Mar. 3, 1839	Dec. 1, 1842			
Aaron Hackley Jr.		N.Y.	Dec. 5, 1819	Mar. 2, 1821			
William Haile		Miss.	Dec. 3, 1826	Sep. 11, 1828			
Bolling Hall		Ga.	Nov. 3, 1811	Mar. 2, 1817			
Obed Hall		N.H.	Nov. 3, 1811	Mar. 2, 1813			
Thomas H. Hall		N.C.	Nov. 30, 1817	Mar. 2, 1835			
Willard Preble Hall		Mo.	Mar. 3, 1847	Mar. 2, 1853			
William Hall		Tenn.	Dec. 4, 1831	Mar. 1, 1833			
William Augustus Hall		Mo.	Jan. 19, 1862	Mar. 3, 1865			
John Edward Halsell		Ky.	Dec. 2, 1883	Mar. 2, 1887			
Silas Halsey	Democratic-Republican	N.Y.	Dec. 1, 1805	Mar. 2, 1807			
Samuel Hambleton	Democratic	Md.	Mar. 3, 1869	Mar. 2, 1873			
Andrew Jackson Hamilton		Tex.	Mar. 3, 1859	Mar. 2, 1861			
James Hamilton Jr.		S.C.	Jan. 5, 1823	Mar. 2, 1829			
William Henry Hammett		Miss.	Mar. 3, 1843	Mar. 2, 1845			
Edward Hammond		Md.	Mar. 3, 1849	Mar. 2, 1853			
Samuel Hammond		Ga.	Oct. 16, 1803	Feb. 1, 1805			
Wade Hampton		S.C.	Dec. 6, 1795	Mar. 2, 1805			
George Hancock		Va.	Dec. 1, 1793	Mar. 2, 1797			
John Hancock		Tex.	Mar. 3, 1871	Mar. 3, 1885			
William Anderson Handley		Ala.	Mar. 3, 1871	Mar. 2, 1873			
James Millander Hanks		Ark.	Mar. 3, 1871	Mar. 2, 1873			
John Andre Hanna		Pa.	May. 14, 1797	Jul. 22, 1805			
Hugh Anderson Haralson		Ga.	Mar. 3, 1843	Mar. 2, 1851			
Thomas Hardeman Jr.		Ga.	Mar. 3, 1859	Mar. 3, 1885			
Benjamin Hardin		Ky.	Dec. 3, 1815	Mar. 2, 1837			
Aaron Harding		Ky.	Mar. 3, 1861	Mar. 2, 1867			
James Harlan		Ky.	Dec. 6, 1835	Mar. 2, 1839			
John Henry Harmanson		La.	Mar. 3, 1845	Oct. 24, 1850			
James Clarence Harper		N.C.	Mar. 3, 1871	Mar. 2, 1873			
Benjamin Gwinn Harris		Md.	Mar. 3, 1863	Mar. 2, 1867			
Henry Richard Harris		Ga.	Mar. 3, 1873	Mar. 2, 1887			
James Morrison Harris		Md.	Mar. 3, 1855	Mar. 2, 1861			
John Thomas Harris		Va.	Mar. 3, 1859	Mar. 2, 1881			
Robert Harris		Pa.	Nov. 30, 1823	Mar. 2, 1827			
Sampson Willis Harris		Ala.	Mar. 3, 1847	Mar. 2, 1857			
Wiley Pope Harris		Miss.	Mar. 3, 1853	Mar. 2, 1855			
William Alexander Harris		Va.	Mar. 3, 1841	Mar. 2, 1843			
Albert Galliton Harrison		Mo.	Dec. 6, 1835	Sep. 6, 1839			
Carter Henry Harrison		Ill.	Mar. 4, 1875	Mar. 2, 1879			
Horace Harrison Harrison		Tenn.	Mar. 3, 1873	Mar. 2, 1875			
Thomas Hartley		Pa.	Mar. 3, 1789	Dec. 20, 1800			
Julian Hartridge		Ga.	Mar. 4, 1875	Mar. 2, 1879			
Abraham Bruyn Hasbrouck		N.Y.	Dec. 4, 1825	Mar. 2, 1827			
Abraham Joseph Hasbrouck		N.Y.	May. 23, 1813	Mar. 2, 1815			
Josiah Hasbrouck		N.Y.	Oct. 16, 1803	Mar. 2, 1819			
William T. Haskell		Tenn.	Mar. 3, 1847	Mar. 2, 1849			
Robert Anthony Hatcher		Mo.	Mar. 3, 1873	Mar. 2, 1879			
John Hathorn		N.Y.	Mar. 3, 1789	Mar. 2, 1797			
Robert Hopkins Hatton		Tenn.	Mar. 3, 1859	Mar. 2, 1861			
Thomas Haughey		Ala.	Jul. 20, 1868	Mar. 2, 1869			
Nathaniel Appleton Haven		N.H.	May. 21, 1809	Mar. 2, 1811			
Jonathan Nicoll Havens		N.Y.	Dec. 6, 1795	Oct. 24, 1799			
Albert Gallatin Hawes		Ky.	Dec. 4, 1831	Mar. 2, 1837			
Aylett Hawes		Va.	Nov. 3, 1811	Mar. 2, 1817			
Richard Hawes		Ky.	Mar. 3, 1837	Mar. 2, 1841			
George Sydney Hawkins		Fla.	Mar. 3, 1857	Jan. 20, 1861			
Isaac Roberts Hawkins		Tenn.	Jul. 23, 1866	Mar. 2, 1871			
Micajah Thomas Hawkins		N.C.	Jan. 5, 1832	Mar. 2, 1841			
Thomas Sherwood Haymond		Va.	Nov. 7, 1849	Mar. 2, 1851			
Charles Eaton Haynes		Ga.	Dec. 4, 1825	Mar. 2, 1839			
Charles Hays		Ala.	Mar. 3, 1869	Mar. 3, 1877			
Samuel Lewis Hays		Va.	Mar. 4, 1841	Mar. 2, 1843			
William Hayward Jr.		Md.	Nov. 30, 1823	Mar. 2, 1825			
James P. Heath		Md.	Dec. 1, 1833	Mar. 2, 1835			
John Heath		Va.	Dec. 1, 1793	Mar. 2, 1797			
Robert Stell Heflin		Ala.	Mar. 3, 1869	Mar. 2, 1871			
Archibald Henderson		N.C.	Dec. 1, 1799	Mar. 2, 1803			
Bennett H. Henderson		Tenn.	Dec. 3, 1815	Mar. 2, 1817			
Thomas Henderson		N.J.	Dec. 6, 1795	Mar. 2, 1797			
Eli Jones Henkle		Md.	Mar. 4, 1875	Mar. 2, 1881			
Daniel Maynadier Henry		Md.	Mar. 4, 1877	Mar. 2, 1881			
John Flournoy Henry		Ky.	Dec. 10, 1826	Mar. 2, 1827			
Robert Pryor Henry		Ky.	Nov. 30, 1823	Aug. 24, 1826			
Hilary Abner Herbert		Ala.	Mar. 4, 1877	Mar. 3, 1893			
John Carlyle Herbert		Md.	Dec. 3, 1815	Mar. 2, 1819			
Thomas Hord Herndon		Ala.	Mar. 17, 1879	Mar. 3, 1885			
Goldsmith Whitehouse Hewitt		Ala.	Mar. 4, 1875	Mar. 3, 1885			
Daniel Hiester		Pa., Md.	Mar. 3, 1789	Mar. 6, 1804			
Joseph Hiester		Pa.	May. 14, 1797	Nov. 30, 1820			
Clement Sidney Hill		Ky.	Mar. 3, 1853	Mar. 2, 1855			
Hugh Lawson White Hill		Tenn.	Mar. 3, 1847	Mar. 2, 1849			
John Hill		N.C.	Mar. 3, 1839	Mar. 2, 1841			
John Hill		Va.	Mar. 3, 1839	Mar. 2, 1841			
William Henry Hill		N.C.	Dec. 1, 1799	Mar. 2, 1803			
Solomon Hillen Jr.		Md.	Mar. 3, 1839	Mar. 2, 1841			
Henry Washington Hilliard		Ala.	Mar. 3, 1845	Mar. 2, 1851			
Junius Hillyer		Ga.	Mar. 3, 1851	Mar. 2, 1855			
Thomas Carmichael Hindman		Ark.	Mar. 3, 1859	Mar. 2, 1861			
Thomas Hinds		Miss.	Dec. 7, 1828	Mar. 2, 1831			
Richard Hines		N.C.	Dec. 4, 1825	Mar. 2, 1827			
Elijah Hise		Ky.	Dec. 2, 1866	May. 7, 1867			
Asa Hodges		Ark.	Mar. 3, 1873	Mar. 2, 1875			
John Henry Hoffecker		Del.	Mar. 3, 1899	Jun. 15, 1900			
John Hoge		Pa.	Oct. 16, 1803	Mar. 2, 1805			
John Blair Hoge		W.Va.	Mar. 3, 1881	Mar. 2, 1883			
James Lawrence Hogeboom		N.Y.	Nov. 30, 1823	Mar. 2, 1825			
Samuel Hogg		Tenn.	Nov. 30, 1817	Mar. 2, 1819			
Alexander Richmond Holladay		Va.	Mar. 3, 1849	Mar. 2, 1853			
James Holland		N.C.	Dec. 6, 1795	Mar. 2, 1811			
Joel Holleman		Va.	Mar. 3, 1839	Dec. 31, 1839			
Gabriel Holmes		N.C.	Dec. 4, 1825	Sep. 25, 1829			
Isaac Edward Holmes		S.C.	Mar. 3, 1839	Mar. 2, 1851			
Hopkins Holsey		Ga.	Dec. 6, 1835	Mar. 2, 1839			
Hines Holt		Ga.	Jan. 31, 1841	Mar. 2, 1841			
Charles Edward Hooker		Miss.	Mar. 4, 1875	Mar. 2, 1903			
Charles Hooks		N.C.	Dec. 3, 1815	Mar. 2, 1825			
George Washington Hopkins		Va.	Mar. 3, 1835	Mar. 2, 1859			
Samuel Hopkins		Ky.	May. 23, 1813	Mar. 2, 1815			
Joseph Hopkinson		Pa.	Dec. 3, 1815	Mar. 2, 1819			
John Ford House		Tenn.	Mar. 4, 1875	Mar. 2, 1883			
John Wallace Houston		Del.	Mar. 3, 1845	Mar. 2, 1851			
Benjamin Chew Howard		Md.	Dec. 4, 1829	Mar. 2, 1839			
Volney Erskine Howard		Tex.	Mar. 3, 1849	Mar. 2, 1853			
Edmund Wilcox Hubard		Va.	Mar. 3, 1841	Mar. 2, 1847			
David Hubbard		Ala.	Mar. 3, 1839	Mar. 2, 1851			
Benjamin Huger		S.C.	Dec. 1, 1799	Mar. 2, 1817			
Daniel Huger		S.C.	Mar. 3, 1789	Mar. 1, 1793			
George Wurtz Hughes		Md.	Mar. 3, 1859	Mar. 2, 1861			
James Madison Hughes		Mo.	Mar. 3, 1843	Mar. 2, 1845			
Parry Wayne Humphreys		Tenn.	May. 23, 1813	Mar. 2, 1815			
John Pratt Hungerford		Va.	Nov. 3, 1811	Mar. 2, 1817			
Theodore Gaillard Hunt		La.	Mar. 3, 1853	Mar. 2, 1855			
Adam Huntsman		Tenn.	Mar. 3, 1835	Mar. 2, 1837			
James Henderson Imlay		N.J.	May. 14, 1797	Mar. 2, 1801			
Samuel Williams Inge		Ala.	Mar. 3, 1847	Mar. 2, 1851			
William Marshall Inge		Tenn.	Dec. 1, 1833	Mar. 2, 1835			
Alfred Briggs Irion		La.	Mar. 3, 1885	Mar. 2, 1887			
William Irvine		Pa.	Dec. 1, 1793	Mar. 2, 1795			
William Irving		N.Y.	May. 23, 1813	Mar. 2, 1819			
James Ferdinand Izlar		S.C.	Apr. 14, 1894	Mar. 3, 1895			
Jabez Young Jackson		Ga.	Dec. 6, 1835	Mar. 2, 1839			
James Jackson		Ga.	Mar. 3, 1857	Jan. 22, 1861			
James Streshly Jackson		Ky.	Mar. 3, 1861	Dec. 12, 1861			
John George Jackson		Va.	Oct. 16, 1803	Mar. 2, 1817			
Joseph Webber Jackson		Ga.	Mar. 3, 1850	Mar. 2, 1853			
John Jameson		Mo.	Dec. 11, 1839	Mar. 2, 1849			
Daniel Jenifer		Md.	Dec. 4, 1831	Mar. 2, 1841			
Albert Gallatin Jenkins		Va.	Mar. 3, 1857	Mar. 2, 1861			
Joshua Husband Jewett		Ky.	Mar. 3, 1855	Mar. 2, 1859			
Kensey Johns Jr.		Del.	Dec. 2, 1827	Mar. 2, 1831			
Cave Johnson		Tenn.	Dec. 6, 1829	Mar. 2, 1845			
Charles Johnson		N.C.	Dec. 6, 1801	Jul. 22, 1802			
Francis Johnson		Ky.	Nov. 12, 1820	Mar. 2, 1827			
James Johnson		Va.	May. 23, 1813	Jan. 31, 1820			
James Johnson		Ga.	Mar. 3, 1851	Mar. 2, 1853			
James Leeper Johnson		Ky.	Mar. 3, 1849	Mar. 2, 1851			
John Telemachus Johnson		Ky.	Dec. 2, 1821	Mar. 2, 1825			
Joseph Johnson		Va.	Nov. 30, 1823	Mar. 2, 1847			
William Cost Johnson		Md.	Dec. 1, 1833	Mar. 2, 1843			
George Washington Jones		Tenn.	Mar. 3, 1843	Mar. 2, 1859			
George Washington Jones		Tex.	Mar. 17, 1879	Mar. 2, 1883			
Isaac Dashiell Jones		Md.	Mar. 3, 1841	Mar. 2, 1843			
James Jones		Va.	Dec. 5, 1819	Mar. 2, 1823			
James Henry Jones		Tex.	Dec. 2, 1883	Mar. 2, 1887			
James Taylor Jones		Ala.	Mar. 4, 1877	Mar. 3, 1889			
John James Jones		Ga.	Mar. 3, 1859	Jan. 22, 1861			
John William Jones		Ga.	Mar. 3, 1847	Mar. 2, 1849			
John Winston Jones		Va.	Mar. 3, 1835	Mar. 2, 1845			
Roland Jones		La.	Mar. 3, 1853	Mar. 2, 1855			
Seaborn Jones		Ga.	Dec. 1, 1833	Mar. 2, 1847			
Walter Jones		Va.	May. 14, 1797	Mar. 2, 1811			
Andrew Thompson Judson		Conn.	Dec. 6, 1835	Jul. 3, 1836			
Laurence Massillon Keitt		S.C.	Mar. 3, 1853	Dec. 9, 1860			
Thomas Kenan		N.C.	Dec. 1, 1805	Mar. 2, 1811			
William Kennedy		N.C.	Oct. 16, 1803	Mar. 2, 1815			
Luther Martin Kennett		Mo.	Mar. 3, 1855	Mar. 2, 1857			
John Kerr		Va.	May. 23, 1813	Mar. 2, 1817			
John Kerr Jr.		N.C.	Mar. 3, 1853	Mar. 2, 1855			
John Kershaw		S.C.	May. 23, 1813	Mar. 2, 1815			
Philip Key		Md.	Oct. 23, 1791	Mar. 1, 1793			
Philip Barton Key		Md.	Oct. 25, 1807	Mar. 2, 1813			
John Kincaid		Ky.	Dec. 6, 1829	Mar. 2, 1831			
Andrew King		Mo.	Mar. 3, 1871	Mar. 2, 1873			
Austin Augustus King		Mo.	Mar. 3, 1863	Mar. 3, 1865			
John King		N.Y.	Dec. 4, 1831	Mar. 1, 1833			
Thomas Butler King		Ga.	Mar. 3, 1839	Dec. 31, 1849			
Dorrance Kirtland		N.Y.	Nov. 30, 1817	Mar. 2, 1819			
Herman Knickerbocker		N.Y.	May. 21, 1809	Mar. 2, 1811			
Nehemiah Knight		R.I.	Dec. 1, 1805	Jun. 12, 1808			
Jacob Michael Kunkel		Md.	Mar. 3, 1857	Mar. 2, 1861			
Alcée Louis La Branche		La.	Mar. 3, 1843	Mar. 2, 1845			
Emile La Sére		La.	Jan. 28, 1846	Mar. 2, 1851			
William Augustus Lake		Miss.	Mar. 3, 1855	Mar. 2, 1857			
Henry Graybill Lamar		Ga.	Dec. 6, 1829	Mar. 1, 1833			
John Basil Lamar		Ga.	Mar. 3, 1843	Jul. 28, 1843			
Alfred William Lamb		Mo.	Mar. 3, 1853	Mar. 2, 1855			
John Morgan Landrum		La.	Mar. 3, 1859	Mar. 2, 1861			
Joseph Aristide Landry		La.	Mar. 3, 1851	Mar. 2, 1853			
Israel George Lash		N.C.	Jul. 19, 1868	Mar. 2, 1871			
Effingham Lawrence		La.	Mar. 3, 1873	Mar. 2, 1875			
Samuel Lawrence		N.Y.	Nov. 30, 1823	Mar. 2, 1825			
John William Lawson		Va.	Mar. 3, 1891	Mar. 3, 1893			
Thomas Lawyer		N.Y.	Nov. 30, 1817	Mar. 2, 1819			
Alfred Morrison Lay		Mo.	Mar. 17, 1879	Mar. 2, 1881			
Luke Lea		Tenn.	Dec. 1, 1833	Mar. 2, 1837			
Pryor Lea		Tenn.	Dec. 2, 1827	Mar. 2, 1831			
James Madison Leach		N.C.	Mar. 3, 1859	Mar. 2, 1875			
Shelton Farrar Leake		Va.	Mar. 3, 1845	Mar. 2, 1861			
Amasa Learned		Conn.	Oct. 23, 1791	Mar. 2, 1795			
Joseph Lecompte		Ky.	Dec. 4, 1825	Mar. 1, 1833			
Henry Lee		Va.	Dec. 1, 1799	Mar. 2, 1801			
John Lee		Md.	Nov. 30, 1823	Mar. 2, 1825			
Richard Bland Lee		Va.	Mar. 3, 1789	Mar. 2, 1795			
William Henry Fitzhugh Lee		Va.	Mar. 3, 1887	Oct. 14, 1891			
John Lefferts		N.Y.	May. 23, 1813	Mar. 2, 1815			
Isaac Leffler		Va.	Dec. 2, 1827	Mar. 2, 1829			
Jabez Leftwich		Va.	Dec. 2, 1821	Mar. 2, 1825			
Hugh Swinton Legaré		S.C.	Mar. 3, 1837	Mar. 2, 1839			
James Lent		N.Y.	Dec. 6, 1829	Mar. 1, 1833			
Rufus Ezekiel Lester		Ga.	Mar. 3, 1889	Jun. 15, 1906			
John Letcher		Va.	Mar. 3, 1851	Mar. 2, 1859			
Robert Perkins Letcher		Ky.	Nov. 30, 1823	Mar. 2, 1835			
Burwell Boykin Lewis		Ala.	Mar. 4, 1875	Mar. 2, 1881			
Charles Swearinger Lewis		Va.	Dec. 3, 1854	Mar. 2, 1855			
Joseph Horace Lewis		Ky.	May. 9, 1870	Mar. 2, 1873			
Joseph Lewis Jr.		Va.	Oct. 16, 1803	Mar. 2, 1817			
William J. Lewis		Va.	Nov. 30, 1817	Mar. 2, 1819			
Robert Fulwood Ligon		Ala.	Mar. 4, 1877	Mar. 2, 1879			
Thomas Watkins Ligon		Md.	Mar. 3, 1845	Mar. 2, 1849			
James Linn		N.J.	Dec. 1, 1799	Mar. 2, 1801			
Henry Walter Livingston		N.Y.	Oct. 16, 1803	Mar. 2, 1807			
Robert Le Roy Livingston		N.Y.	May. 21, 1809	May. 5, 1812			
Matthew Locke		N.C.	Dec. 1, 1793	Mar. 2, 1799			
James Rush Lofland		Del.	Mar. 3, 1873	Mar. 2, 1875			
Edward Henry Carroll Long		Md.	Mar. 3, 1845	Mar. 2, 1847			
John Long		N.C.	Dec. 2, 1821	Mar. 2, 1829			
Peter Early Love		Ga.	Mar. 3, 1859	Jan. 22, 1861			
John Lovett		N.Y.	May. 23, 1813	Mar. 2, 1817			
Christian Lower		Pa.	Dec. 1, 1805	Dec. 18, 1806			
Thomas Lowndes		S.C.	Dec. 6, 1801	Mar. 2, 1805			
William Lowndes		S.C.	Nov. 3, 1811	May. 7, 1822			
George Loyall		Va.	Mar. 8, 1830	Mar. 2, 1837			
Edward Lucas		Va.	Dec. 1, 1833	Mar. 2, 1837			
John Baptiste Charles Lucas		Pa.	Oct. 16, 1803	Mar. 2, 1805			
William Lucas		Va.	Mar. 3, 1839	Mar. 2, 1845			
John Henry Lumpkin		Ga.	Mar. 3, 1843	Mar. 2, 1857			
Chittenden Lyon		Ky.	Dec. 2, 1827	Mar. 2, 1835			
Francis Strother Lyon		Ala.	Dec. 6, 1835	Mar. 2, 1839			
Matthew Lyon		Vt., Ky.	May. 14, 1797	Mar. 2, 1811			
James Machir		Va.	May. 14, 1797	Mar. 2, 1799			
Archibald Thompson MacIntyre		Ga.	Mar. 3, 1871	Mar. 2, 1873			
James Madison	Democratic-Republican	Virginia's 5th district (1789–1793), 15th district (1793–1797)	Mar. 3, 1789	Mar. 2, 1797	100+	Yes (1809–1817)	Later elected president. Madison occasionally condemned the institution of slavery and opposed the international slave trade, but he also vehemently opposed any attempts to restrict its domestic expansion. Madison did not free his slaves during his lifetime or in his will. Paul Jennings, one of Madison's slaves, served him during his presidency and later published the first memoir of life in the White House.
Patrick Magruder		Md.	Dec. 1, 1805	Mar. 2, 1807			
Francis Mallory		Va.	Mar. 3, 1837	Mar. 2, 1843			
Robert Mallory		Ky.	Mar. 3, 1859	Mar. 3, 1865			
John Manning Jr.		N.C.	Mar. 3, 1869	Mar. 2, 1871			
Richard Irvine Manning		S.C.	Dec. 7, 1834	Apr. 30, 1836			
Vannoy Hartrog Manning		Miss.	Mar. 4, 1877	Mar. 2, 1883			
John Hartwell Marable		Tenn.	Dec. 4, 1825	Mar. 2, 1829			
Samuel Wright Mardis		Ala.	Dec. 4, 1831	Mar. 2, 1835			
Robert Marion		S.C.	Dec. 1, 1805	Dec. 3, 1810			
George Washington Lent Marr		Tenn.	Nov. 30, 1817	Mar. 2, 1819			
Alexander Keith Marshall		Ky.	Mar. 3, 1855	Mar. 2, 1857			
Humphrey Marshall		Ky.	Mar. 3, 1849	Mar. 2, 1859			
John Marshall		Va.	Dec. 1, 1799	Jun. 6, 1800			
Thomas Alexander Marshall		Ky.	Dec. 4, 1831	Mar. 2, 1835			
Thomas Francis Marshall		Ky.	Mar. 3, 1841	Mar. 2, 1843			
Barclay Martin		Tenn.	Mar. 3, 1845	Mar. 2, 1847			
John Mason Martin		Ala.	Mar. 3, 1885	Mar. 2, 1887			
John Preston Martin		Ky.	Mar. 3, 1845	Mar. 2, 1847			
Joshua Lanier Martin		Ala.	Dec. 6, 1835	Mar. 2, 1839			
William Dickinson Martin		S.C.	Dec. 2, 1827	Mar. 2, 1831			
John Calvin Mason		Ky.	Mar. 3, 1849	Mar. 2, 1859			
John Thomson Mason		Md.	Mar. 3, 1841	Mar. 2, 1843			
John Young Mason		Va.	Dec. 4, 1831	Jan. 10, 1837			
Vincent Mathews		N.Y.	May. 21, 1809	Mar. 2, 1811			
James Matlack		N.J.	Dec. 2, 1821	Mar. 2, 1825			
Abram Poindexter Maury		Tenn.	Mar. 3, 1835	Mar. 2, 1839			
Augustus Emmett Maxwell		Fla.	Mar. 3, 1853	Mar. 2, 1857			
George Clifford Maxwell		N.J.	Nov. 3, 1811	Mar. 2, 1813			
Lewis Maxwell		Va.	Dec. 2, 1827	Mar. 1, 1833			
William L. May		Ill.	Nov. 30, 1834	Mar. 2, 1839			
Horace Maynard		Tenn.	Mar. 3, 1857	Mar. 2, 1875			
Robert Murphy Mayo		Va.	Dec. 2, 1883	Mar. 3, 1885			
William Mayrant		S.C.	Dec. 3, 1815	Oct. 20, 1816			
Archibald McBryde		N.C.	May. 21, 1809	Mar. 2, 1813			
Abraham McClellan		Tenn.	Mar. 3, 1837	Mar. 2, 1843			
Joseph Washington McClurg		Mo.	Mar. 3, 1863	Jun. 30, 1868			
William McComas		Va.	Dec. 1, 1833	Mar. 2, 1837			
Felix Grundy McConnell		Ala.	Mar. 3, 1843	Sep. 9, 1846			
Andrew McCord		N.Y.	Oct. 16, 1803	Mar. 2, 1805			
James Robinson McCormick		Mo.	Dec. 16, 1867	Mar. 2, 1873			
John McCreary		S.C.	Dec. 5, 1819	Mar. 2, 1821			
William McCreery		Md.	Oct. 16, 1803	Mar. 2, 1809			
Hiram McCullough		Md.	Mar. 3, 1865	Mar. 2, 1869			
William McDaniel		Mo.	Dec. 6, 1846	Mar. 2, 1847			
James McDowell		Va.	Mar. 5, 1846	Mar. 2, 1851			
Joseph McDowell		N.C.	Mar. 3, 1797	Mar. 2, 1799			
William McFarland		Tenn.	Mar. 4, 1875	Mar. 3, 1877			
Robert Lytle McHatton		Ky.	Dec. 6, 1826	Mar. 2, 1829			
Henry Davis McHenry		Ky.	Mar. 3, 1871	Mar. 2, 1873			
John Hardin McHenry		Ky.	Mar. 3, 1845	Mar. 2, 1847			
James Iver McKay		N.C.	Feb. 19, 1832	Mar. 2, 1849			
John McKee		Ala.	Nov. 30, 1823	Mar. 2, 1829			
Samuel McKee		Ky.	May. 21, 1809	Mar. 2, 1817			
Lewis McKenzie		Va.	Feb. 15, 1863	Mar. 2, 1871			
Alexander McKim		Md.	May. 21, 1809	Mar. 2, 1815			
William McKinley		Va.	May. 22, 1809	Mar. 2, 1811			
Thomas McKissock		N.Y.	Mar. 3, 1849	Mar. 2, 1851			
Alney McLean		Ky.	Dec. 3, 1815	Mar. 2, 1821			
Finis Ewing McLean		Ky.	Mar. 3, 1849	Mar. 2, 1851			
John McLean		Ohio	May. 23, 1813	Dec. 31, 1815			
Fayette McMullen		Va.	Mar. 3, 1849	Mar. 2, 1857			
Archibald McNeill		N.C.	Dec. 2, 1821	Mar. 2, 1827			
John McQueen		S.C.	Feb. 11, 1849	Dec. 20, 1860			
James McSherry		Pa.	Dec. 2, 1821	Mar. 2, 1823			
William McWillie		Miss.	Mar. 3, 1849	Mar. 2, 1851			
Cowles Mead		Ga.	Dec. 1, 1805	Dec. 23, 1805			
Richard Kidder Meade		Va.	Aug. 4, 1847	Mar. 2, 1853			
John William Menzies		Ky.	Mar. 3, 1861	Mar. 2, 1863			
Charles Fenton Mercer		Va.	Nov. 30, 1817	Dec. 25, 1839			
John Francis Mercer		Md.	Oct. 23, 1791	Apr. 12, 1794			
James Meriwether		Ga.	Dec. 4, 1825	Mar. 2, 1827			
James A. Meriwether		Ga.	Mar. 3, 1841	Mar. 2, 1843			
Henry Middleton		S.C.	Dec. 3, 1815	Mar. 2, 1819			
John Millen		Ga.	Mar. 3, 1843	Oct. 14, 1843			
John Gaines Miller		Mo.	Mar. 3, 1851	May. 10, 1856			
Morris Smith Miller		N.Y.	May. 23, 1813	Mar. 2, 1815			
Pleasant Moorman Miller		Tenn.	May. 21, 1809	Mar. 2, 1811			
John Singleton Millson		Va.	Mar. 3, 1849	Mar. 2, 1861			
William Milnor		Pa.	Oct. 25, 1807	May. 7, 1822			
Charles Miner		Pa.	Dec. 4, 1825	Mar. 2, 1829			
Anderson Mitchell		N.C.	Apr. 26, 1842	Mar. 2, 1843			
George Edward Mitchell		Md.	Nov. 30, 1823	Jun. 27, 1832			
James Coffield Mitchell		Tenn.	Mar. 3, 1825	Mar. 2, 1829			
Thomas Rothmaler Mitchell		S.C.	Dec. 2, 1821	Mar. 1, 1833			
Robert Monell		N.Y.	Dec. 5, 1819	Feb. 20, 1831			
John Montgomery		Md.	Oct. 25, 1807	Apr. 28, 1811			
Thomas Montgomery		Ky.	May. 23, 1813	Mar. 2, 1823			
John Moore		La.	Dec. 16, 1840	Mar. 2, 1853			
Laban Theodore Moore		Ky.	Mar. 3, 1859	Mar. 2, 1861			
Littleton Wilde Moore		Tex.	Mar. 3, 1887	Mar. 3, 1893			
Sydenham Moore		Ala.	Mar. 3, 1857	Jan. 20, 1861			
Thomas Moore		S.C.	Dec. 6, 1801	Mar. 2, 1817			
Thomas Love Moore		Va.	Nov. 12, 1820	Mar. 2, 1823			
Thomas Patrick Moore		Ky.	Nov. 30, 1823	Mar. 2, 1829			
Charles Slaughter Morehead		Ky.	Mar. 3, 1847	Mar. 2, 1851			
James Turner Morehead		N.C.	Mar. 3, 1851	Mar. 2, 1853			
Daniel Morgan		Va.	May. 14, 1797	Mar. 2, 1799			
James Bright Morgan		Miss.	Mar. 3, 1885	Mar. 2, 1891			
Thomas Morris		N.Y.	Dec. 6, 1801	Mar. 2, 1803			
Isaac Edward Morse		La.	Dec. 1, 1844	Mar. 2, 1851			
Jeremiah Morton		Va.	Mar. 3, 1849	Mar. 2, 1851			
Jonathan Ogden Moseley		Conn.	Dec. 1, 1805	Mar. 2, 1821			
James Mott		N.J.	Dec. 6, 1801	Mar. 2, 1805			
James Mullins		Tenn.	Mar. 3, 1867	Mar. 2, 1869			
Gurdon Saltonstall Mumford		N.Y.	Dec. 1, 1805	Mar. 2, 1811			
Charles Murphey		Ga.	Mar. 3, 1851	Mar. 2, 1853			
John Murphy		Ala.	Dec. 1, 1833	Mar. 2, 1835			
John L. Murray		Ky.	Mar. 3, 1837	Mar. 2, 1839			
Benjamin Duke Nabers		Miss.	Mar. 3, 1851	Mar. 2, 1853			
Raphael Neale		Md.	Dec. 5, 1819	Mar. 2, 1825			
Hugh Nelson		Va.	Nov. 3, 1811	Jan. 13, 1823			
John Nelson		Md.	Dec. 2, 1821	Mar. 2, 1823			
Roger Nelson		Md.	Oct. 16, 1803	May. 13, 1810			
Thomas Amos Rogers Nelson		Tenn.	Mar. 3, 1859	Mar. 2, 1863			
Thomas Maduit Nelson		Va.	Dec. 3, 1815	Mar. 2, 1819			
Wilson Nesbitt		S.C.	Nov. 30, 1817	Mar. 2, 1819			
Joseph Neville		Va.	Dec. 1, 1793	Mar. 2, 1795			
Anthony New		Va., Ky.	Dec. 1, 1793	Mar. 2, 1823			
Alexander Newman		Va.	Mar. 3, 1849	Sep. 7, 1849			
Daniel Newnan		Ga.	Dec. 4, 1831	Mar. 1, 1833			
Thomas Willoughby Newton		Ark.	Feb. 5, 1847	Mar. 2, 1847			
Willoughby Newton		Va.	Mar. 3, 1843	Mar. 2, 1845			
Silas Leslie Niblack		Fla.	Mar. 3, 1871	Mar. 2, 1873			
John Nicholas		Va.	Dec. 1, 1793	Mar. 2, 1801			
John Calhoun Nicholls		Ga.	Mar. 17, 1879	Mar. 3, 1885			
John Nicholson		N.Y.	May. 21, 1809	Mar. 2, 1811			
John Anthony Nicholson		Del.	Mar. 3, 1865	Mar. 2, 1869			
Joseph Hopper Nicholson		Md.	Dec. 1, 1799	Feb. 28, 1806			
Jason Niles		Miss.	Mar. 3, 1873	Mar. 2, 1875			
Eugenius Aristides Nisbet		Ga.	Mar. 3, 1839	Oct. 11, 1841			
John William Noell		Mo.	Mar. 3, 1859	Mar. 13, 1863			
Elijah Hise Norton		Mo.	Mar. 3, 1861	Mar. 2, 1863			
Abraham Nott		S.C.	Dec. 1, 1799	Mar. 2, 1801			
William Thompson Nuckolls		S.C.	Dec. 2, 1827	Mar. 1, 1833			
David Alexander Nunn		Tenn.	Mar. 3, 1867	Mar. 2, 1875			
Michael Patrick O’Connor		S.C.	Mar. 17, 1879	Mar. 2, 1883			
Alexander Ogle		Pa.	Nov. 30, 1817	Mar. 2, 1819			
Stephen Ormsby		Ky.	Nov. 3, 1811	Mar. 2, 1817			
Alexander Dalrymple Orr		Ky.	Oct. 23, 1791	Mar. 2, 1797			
James Lawrence Orr		S.C.	Mar. 3, 1849	Mar. 2, 1859			
David Outlaw		N.C.	Mar. 3, 1847	Mar. 2, 1853			
George Outlaw		N.C.	Dec. 5, 1824	Mar. 2, 1825			
James Overstreet		S.C.	Dec. 5, 1819	May. 23, 1822			
Walter Hampden Overton		La.	Dec. 6, 1829	Mar. 2, 1831			
Allen Ferdinand Owen	Whig	Ga.	Mar. 3, 1849	Mar. 2, 1851	8		1850 Census of Slave Inhabitants; 1860 census of Slave Inhabitants
George Washington Owen		Ala.	Dec. 2, 1823	Mar. 2, 1829			
James Owen		N.C.	Nov. 30, 1817	Mar. 2, 1819			
George Welshman Owens		Ga.	Dec. 6, 1835	Mar. 2, 1839			
Bryan Young Owsley		Ky.	Mar. 3, 1841	Mar. 2, 1843			
John Page		Va.	Mar. 3, 1789	Mar. 2, 1797			
Robert Page		Va.	Dec. 1, 1799	Mar. 2, 1801			
Robert Treat Paine		N.C.	Mar. 3, 1855	Mar. 2, 1857			
Beriah Palmer		N.Y.	Oct. 16, 1803	Mar. 2, 1805			
James Parker		N.J.	Dec. 1, 1833	Mar. 2, 1837			
Josiah Parker		Va.	Mar. 3, 1789	Mar. 2, 1801			
Richard Parker		Va.	Mar. 3, 1849	Mar. 2, 1851			
Severn Eyre Parker		Va.	Dec. 5, 1819	Mar. 2, 1821			
Josiah Patterson		Tenn.	Mar. 3, 1891	Mar. 2, 1897			
Walter Patterson		N.Y.	Dec. 2, 1821	Mar. 2, 1823			
John Mercer Patton		Va.	Dec. 5, 1830	Apr. 6, 1838			
Levi Pawling		Pa.	Nov. 30, 1817	Mar. 2, 1819			
William Winter Payne		Ala.	Mar. 3, 1841	Mar. 2, 1847			
Joseph Pearson		N.C.	May. 21, 1809	Mar. 2, 1815			
John Pegram		Va.	Nov. 30, 1817	Mar. 2, 1819			
Charles Pelham		Ala.	Mar. 3, 1873	Mar. 2, 1875			
John Strother Pendleton		Va.	Mar. 3, 1845	Mar. 2, 1849			
Alexander Gordon Penn		La.	Dec. 29, 1850	Mar. 2, 1853			
John Perkins Jr.		La.	Mar. 3, 1853	Mar. 2, 1855			
Thomas Johns Perry		Md.	Mar. 3, 1845	Mar. 2, 1847			
Henry Persons		Ga.	Mar. 17, 1879	Mar. 2, 1881			
George Peter		Md.	Dec. 3, 1815	Mar. 2, 1827			
Ebenezer Pettigrew		N.C.	Mar. 3, 1835	Mar. 2, 1837			
Balie Peyton		Tenn.	Dec. 1, 1833	Mar. 2, 1837			
Samuel Oldham Peyton		Ky.	Mar. 3, 1847	Mar. 2, 1861			
John Smith Phelps		Mo.	Mar. 3, 1845	Mar. 2, 1863			
Oliver Phelps		N.Y.	Oct. 16, 1803	Mar. 2, 1805			
John Finis Philips		Mo.	Mar. 4, 1875	Mar. 2, 1881			
Elijah Conner Phister		Ky.	Mar. 17, 1879	Mar. 2, 1883			
Andrew Pickens		S.C.	Dec. 1, 1793	Mar. 2, 1795			
Francis Wilkinson Pickens		S.C.	Dec. 7, 1834	Mar. 2, 1843			
Isaac Pierson		N.J.	Dec. 2, 1827	Mar. 2, 1831			
Jeremiah Halsey Pierson		N.Y.	Dec. 2, 1821	Mar. 2, 1823			
Timothy Pilsbury		Tex.	Mar. 29, 1846	Mar. 2, 1849			
Henry Laurens Pinckney		S.C.	Dec. 1, 1833	Mar. 2, 1837			
Thomas Pinckney		S.C.	May. 14, 1797	Mar. 2, 1801			
James Pindall		Va.	Nov. 30, 1817	Jul. 25, 1820			
Thomas Plater		Md.	Dec. 6, 1801	Mar. 2, 1805			
Jonas Platt		N.Y.	Dec. 1, 1799	Mar. 2, 1801			
Franklin E. Plummer		Miss.	Dec. 4, 1831	Mar. 2, 1835			
Joel Roberts Poinsett		S.C.	Dec. 2, 1821	Mar. 6, 1825			
James K. Polk	Democratic	Tennessee's 6th district (1833–1839), 9th district (1825–1833)	Mar. 3, 1825	Mar. 2, 1839	56	Yes (1845–1849)	Later elected president. Polk became the Democratic nominee for president in 1844 partially because of his tolerance of slavery, in contrast to Van Buren. As president, he generally supported the rights of slave owners. His will provided for the freeing of his slaves after the death of his wife, though the Emancipation Proclamation and the Thirteenth Amendment to the United States Constitution ended up freeing them long before her death in 1891.
William Hawkins Polk		Tenn.	Mar. 3, 1851	Mar. 2, 1853			
Daniel Haymond Polsley		W.Va.	Mar. 3, 1867	Mar. 2, 1869			
Patrick Hamilton Pope		Ky.	Dec. 1, 1833	Mar. 2, 1835			
Gilchrist Porter		Mo.	Mar. 3, 1851	Mar. 2, 1857			
Peter Buell Porter		N.Y.	May. 21, 1809	Jan. 22, 1816			
Elisha Reynolds Potter		R.I.	Dec. 6, 1795	Mar. 2, 1815			
Alfred H. Powell		Va.	Dec. 4, 1825	Mar. 2, 1827			
Cuthbert Powell		Va.	Mar. 3, 1841	Mar. 2, 1843			
Leven Powell		Va.	Dec. 1, 1799	Mar. 2, 1801			
Samuel Powell		Tenn.	Dec. 3, 1815	Mar. 2, 1817			
Francis Preston		Va.	Dec. 1, 1793	Mar. 2, 1797			
Jacob Alexander Preston		Md.	Mar. 3, 1843	Mar. 2, 1845			
William Preston		Ky.	Dec. 5, 1852	Mar. 2, 1855			
William Ballard Preston		Va.	Mar. 3, 1847	Mar. 2, 1849			
Sterling Price		Mo.	Mar. 3, 1845	Aug. 11, 1846			
Thomas Lawson Price		Mo.	Jan. 20, 1862	Mar. 2, 1863			
Richard Clauselle Puryear		N.C.	Mar. 3, 1853	Mar. 2, 1857			
James Minor Quarles		Tenn.	Mar. 3, 1859	Mar. 2, 1861			
Tunstall Quarles		Ky.	Nov. 30, 1817	Jun. 14, 1820			
John Anthony Quitman		Miss.	Mar. 3, 1855	Jul. 16, 1858			
William Ramsey		Pa.	Dec. 2, 1827	Sep. 28, 1831			
Alexander Randall		Md.	Mar. 3, 1841	Mar. 2, 1843			
William Harrison Randall		Ky.	Mar. 3, 1863	Mar. 2, 1867			
Thomas Mann Randolph		Va.	Oct. 16, 1803	Mar. 2, 1807			
Morgan Rawls		Ga.	Mar. 3, 1873	Mar. 2, 1875			
Kenneth Rayner		N.C.	Mar. 3, 1839	Mar. 2, 1845			
William Brown Read		Ky.	Mar. 3, 1871	Mar. 2, 1875			
Edwin Godwin Reade		N.C.	Mar. 3, 1855	Mar. 2, 1857			
Charles Ready		Tenn.	Mar. 3, 1853	Mar. 2, 1859			
David Addison Reese		Ga.	Mar. 3, 1853	Mar. 2, 1855			
John William Reid		Mo.	Mar. 3, 1861	Aug. 2, 1861			
Robert Raymond Reid		Ga.	Nov. 30, 1817	Mar. 2, 1823			
James Hugh Relfe		Mo.	Mar. 3, 1843	Mar. 2, 1847			
Abraham Rencher		N.C.	Dec. 20, 1830	Mar. 2, 1843			
James B. Reynolds		Tenn.	Dec. 3, 1815	Mar. 2, 1825			
John Reynolds		Ill.	Dec. 1, 1833	Mar. 2, 1843			
John Rhea		Tenn.	Oct. 16, 1803	Mar. 2, 1823			
James Barroll Ricaud		Md.	Mar. 3, 1855	Mar. 2, 1859			
John McConnell Rice		Ky.	Mar. 3, 1869	Mar. 2, 1873			
John Richards		Pa.	Dec. 6, 1795	Mar. 2, 1797			
John Peter Richardson		S.C.	Dec. 18, 1836	Mar. 2, 1839			
John Smythe Richardson		S.C.	Mar. 17, 1879	Mar. 2, 1883			
William Richardson		Ala.	Mar. 3, 1899	Mar. 30, 1914			
Haywood Yancey Riddle		Tenn.	Mar. 4, 1875	Mar. 2, 1879			
Robert Ridgway		Va.	Mar. 3, 1869	Mar. 2, 1871			
Samuel Riker		N.Y.	Nov. 4, 1804	Mar. 2, 1809			
Samuel Ringgold		Md.	May. 21, 1809	Mar. 2, 1821			
Eleazar Wheelock Ripley		La.	Dec. 15, 1835	Mar. 1, 1839			
Burwell Clark Ritter		Ky.	Mar. 3, 1865	Mar. 2, 1867			
Thomas Rivers		Tenn.	Mar. 3, 1855	Mar. 2, 1857			
Francis Everod Rives		Va.	Mar. 3, 1837	Mar. 2, 1841			
John Roane		Va.	May. 21, 1809	Mar. 2, 1837			
John Jones Roane		Va.	Dec. 4, 1831	Mar. 1, 1833			
Robert Whyte Roberts		Miss.	Mar. 3, 1843	Mar. 2, 1847			
Edward White Robertson		La.	Mar. 4, 1877	Aug. 1, 1887			
George Robertson		Ky.	Nov. 30, 1817	Mar. 2, 1821			
John Robertson		Va.	Dec. 7, 1834	Mar. 2, 1839			
Thomas Bolling Robertson		La.	Nov. 3, 1811	Apr. 19, 1818			
Thomas Robinson Jr.		Del.	Mar. 3, 1839	Mar. 2, 1841			
William Rodman		Pa.	Nov. 3, 1811	Mar. 2, 1813			
Anthony Astley Cooper Rogers		Ark.	Mar. 3, 1869	Mar. 2, 1871			
James Rogers		S.C.	Mar. 3, 1835	Mar. 2, 1843			
Sion Hart Rogers		N.C.	Mar. 3, 1853	Mar. 2, 1873			
James Sidney Rollins		Mo.	Mar. 3, 1861	Mar. 3, 1865			
James Dixon Roman		Md.	Mar. 3, 1847	Mar. 2, 1849			
Robert Selden Rose		N.Y.	Nov. 30, 1823	Mar. 2, 1831			
Lovell Harrison Rousseau		Ky.	Mar. 3, 1865	Mar. 2, 1867			
Thomas Ruffin		N.C.	Mar. 3, 1853	Mar. 2, 1861			
Edward Rumsey		Ky.	Mar. 3, 1837	Mar. 2, 1839			
David Abel Russell		N.Y.	Mar. 3, 1835	Mar. 2, 1841			
Albert Rust		Ark.	Mar. 3, 1855	Mar. 2, 1861			
Robert Rutherford		Va.	Dec. 1, 1793	Mar. 2, 1797			
John Rutledge Jr.		S.C.	May. 14, 1797	Mar. 2, 1803			
Peter Sailly		N.Y.	Dec. 1, 1805	Mar. 2, 1807			
Thomas Sammons		N.Y.	Oct. 16, 1803	Mar. 2, 1813			
Green Berry Samuels		Va.	Mar. 3, 1839	Mar. 2, 1841			
James T. Sandford		Tenn.	Nov. 30, 1823	Mar. 2, 1825			
Thomas Sandford		Ky.	Oct. 16, 1803	Mar. 2, 1807			
John Milton Sandidge		La.	Mar. 3, 1855	Mar. 2, 1859			
Joshua Sands		N.Y.	Oct. 16, 1803	Mar. 2, 1827			
John W.A. Sanford		Ga.	Dec. 6, 1835	Jul. 1, 1835			
Romulus Mitchell Saunders		N.C.	Dec. 2, 1821	Mar. 2, 1845			
John Savage		N.Y.	Dec. 3, 1815	Mar. 2, 1819			
Lemuel Sawyer		N.C.	Oct. 25, 1807	Mar. 2, 1829			
Samuel Locke Sawyer		Mo.	Mar. 17, 1879	Mar. 2, 1881			
Samuel Tredwell Sawyer		N.C.	Mar. 3, 1837	Mar. 2, 1839			
Alfred Moore Scales		N.C.	Mar. 3, 1857	Mar. 3, 1885			
Abraham Henry Schenck		N.Y.	Dec. 3, 1815	Mar. 2, 1817			
Gustave Schleicher		Tex.	Mar. 4, 1875	Mar. 2, 1879			
William Schley		Ga.	Dec. 1, 1833	Jun. 30, 1835			
Cornelius Corneliusen Schoonmaker		N.Y.	Oct. 23, 1791	Mar. 1, 1793			
Martin Gerretsen Schuneman		N.Y.	Dec. 1, 1805	Mar. 2, 1807			
Philip Jeremiah Schuyler		N.Y.	Nov. 30, 1817	Mar. 2, 1819			
John Scott		Mo.	Dec. 3, 1815	Mar. 2, 1827			
Tredwell Scudder		N.Y.	Nov. 30, 1817	Mar. 2, 1819			
James Alexander Seddon		Va.	Mar. 3, 1845	Mar. 2, 1851			
Joseph Eggleston Segar		Va.	Mar. 14, 1862	Mar. 2, 1863			
Benedict Joseph Semmes		Md.	Dec. 6, 1829	Mar. 1, 1833			
William Tandy Senter		Tenn.	Mar. 3, 1843	Mar. 2, 1845			
Thomas Settle		N.C.	Nov. 30, 1817	Mar. 2, 1821			
John Sevier		N.C., Tenn.	Mar. 3, 1789	Sep. 23, 1815			
James Lindsay Seward		Ga.	Mar. 3, 1853	Mar. 2, 1859			
George Sea Shanklin		Ky.	Mar. 3, 1865	Mar. 2, 1867			
Solomon P. Sharp		Ky.	May. 23, 1813	Mar. 2, 1817			
Henry Marchmore Shaw		N.C.	Mar. 3, 1853	Mar. 2, 1859			
Daniel Sheffey		Va.	May. 21, 1809	Mar. 2, 1817			
Charles Miller Shelley		Ala.	Mar. 4, 1877	Mar. 3, 1885			
Charles Biddle Shepard		N.C.	Mar. 3, 1837	Mar. 2, 1841			
William Biddle Shepard		N.C.	Dec. 6, 1829	Mar. 2, 1837			
Augustine Henry Shepperd		N.C.	Dec. 2, 1827	Mar. 2, 1851			
Upton Sheredine		Md.	Oct. 23, 1791	Mar. 1, 1793			
William Crawford Sherrod		Ala.	Mar. 3, 1869	Mar. 2, 1871			
Samuel Sherwood		N.Y.	May. 23, 1813	Mar. 2, 1815			
Samuel Burr Sherwood		Conn.	Nov. 30, 1817	Mar. 2, 1819			
Benjamin Glover Shields		Ala.	Mar. 3, 1841	Mar. 2, 1843			
Zebulon Rudd Shipherd		N.Y.	May. 23, 1813	Mar. 2, 1815			
Francis Edwin Shober		N.C.	Mar. 3, 1869	Mar. 2, 1873			
Eli Sims Shorter		Ala.	Mar. 3, 1855	Mar. 2, 1859			
Jacob Shower		Md.	Mar. 3, 1853	Mar. 2, 1855			
Peter Silvester		N.Y.	Mar. 3, 1789	Mar. 1, 1793			
Eldred Simkins		S.C.	Nov. 30, 1817	Mar. 2, 1821			
William Emmett Simms		Ky.	Mar. 3, 1859	Mar. 2, 1861			
Richard Franklin Simpson		S.C.	Mar. 3, 1843	Mar. 2, 1849			
Alexander Dromgoole Sims		S.C.	Mar. 3, 1845	Nov. 15, 1848			
Leonard Henly Sims		Mo.	Mar. 3, 1845	Mar. 2, 1847			
Otho Robards Singleton		Miss.	Mar. 3, 1853	Mar. 2, 1887			
Charles Slade		Ill.	Dec. 1, 1833	Mar. 2, 1835			
Amos Slaymaker		Pa.	May. 23, 1813	Mar. 2, 1815			
William Ferguson Slemons		Ark.	Mar. 4, 1875	Mar. 2, 1881			
Jesse Slocumb		N.C.	Nov. 30, 1817	Dec. 19, 1820			
Arthur Smith		Va.	Dec. 2, 1821	Mar. 2, 1825			
Ballard Smith		Va.	Dec. 3, 1815	Mar. 2, 1821			
Bernard Smith		N.J.	Dec. 5, 1819	Mar. 2, 1821			
James Strudwick Smith		N.C.	Nov. 30, 1817	Mar. 2, 1821			
John Speed Smith		Ky.	Dec. 2, 1821	Mar. 2, 1823			
O’Brien Smith		S.C.	Dec. 1, 1805	Mar. 2, 1807			
William Smith		Md.	Mar. 3, 1789	Mar. 2, 1791			
William Smith		Va.	Dec. 2, 1821	Mar. 2, 1827			
William Smith		Va.	Mar. 3, 1841	Mar. 2, 1861			
William Ephraim Smith		Ga.	Mar. 4, 1875	Mar. 2, 1881			
William Jay Smith		Tenn.	Mar. 3, 1869	Mar. 2, 1871			
William Loughton Smith		S.C.	Mar. 3, 1789	Mar. 2, 1799			
William Nathan Harrell Smith		N.C.	Mar. 3, 1859	Mar. 2, 1861			
William Russell Smith		Ala.	Mar. 3, 1851	Mar. 2, 1857			
George Washington Smyth		Tex.	Mar. 3, 1853	Mar. 2, 1855			
William Henry Sneed		Tenn.	Mar. 3, 1855	Mar. 2, 1857			
John Fryall Snodgrass		Va.	Mar. 3, 1853	Jun. 4, 1854			
Augustus Rhodes Sollers		Md.	Mar. 3, 1841	Mar. 2, 1855			
Henry Southard		N.J.	Dec. 6, 1801	Mar. 2, 1821			
Isaac Southard		N.J.	Dec. 4, 1831	Mar. 1, 1833			
William Wright Southgate		Ky.	Mar. 3, 1837	Mar. 2, 1839			
Richard Dobbs Spaight		N.C.	May. 14, 1797	Mar. 2, 1801			
Richard Dobbs Spaight Jr.		N.C.	Nov. 30, 1823	Mar. 2, 1825			
Thomas Spalding		Ga.	Dec. 1, 1805	Dec. 31, 1805			
Thomas Speed		Ky.	Nov. 30, 1817	Mar. 2, 1819			
Thomas Ara Spence		Md.	Mar. 3, 1843	Mar. 2, 1845			
Ambrose Spencer		N.Y.	Dec. 6, 1829	Mar. 2, 1831			
John Canfield Spencer		N.Y.	Nov. 30, 1817	Mar. 2, 1819			
Richard Spencer		Md.	Dec. 6, 1829	Mar. 2, 1831			
William Brainerd Spencer		La.	Mar. 4, 1875	Mar. 3, 1877			
Michael Cresap Sprigg		Md.	Dec. 2, 1827	Mar. 2, 1831			
Richard Sprigg Jr.		Md.	Dec. 6, 1795	Mar. 2, 1803			
Thomas Sprigg		Md.	Dec. 1, 1793	Mar. 2, 1797			
Eli Thomas Stackhouse		S.C.	Mar. 3, 1891	Jun. 13, 1892			
James Adams Stallworth		Ala.	Mar. 3, 1857	Jan. 20, 1861			
Elisha David Standiford		Ky.	Mar. 3, 1873	Mar. 2, 1875			
Richard Stanford		N.C.	May. 14, 1797	Apr. 8, 1816			
Edward Stanly		N.C.	Mar. 3, 1837	Mar. 2, 1853			
John Stanly		N.C.	Dec. 6, 1801	Mar. 2, 1811			
Frederick Perry Stanton		Tenn.	Mar. 3, 1845	Mar. 2, 1855			
Richard Henry Stanton		Ky.	Mar. 3, 1849	Mar. 2, 1855			
John Steele		N.C.	Mar. 3, 1789	Mar. 1, 1793			
John Nevett Steele		Md.	Jun. 8, 1834	Mar. 2, 1837			
Walter Leak Steele		N.C.	Mar. 4, 1877	Mar. 2, 1881			
Lewis Steenrod		Va.	Mar. 3, 1839	Mar. 2, 1845			
Alexander Hamilton Stephens		Ga.	Oct. 1, 1843	Mar. 2, 1883			
James Stephenson		Va.	Oct. 16, 1803	Mar. 2, 1825			
Samuel Sterett		Md.	Oct. 23, 1791	Mar. 1, 1793			
Andrew Stevenson		Va.	Dec. 2, 1821	Jun. 1, 1834			
Charles Stewart		Tex.	Dec. 2, 1883	Mar. 3, 1893			
James Stewart		N.C.	Nov. 30, 1817	Mar. 2, 1819			
James Augustus Stewart		Md.	Mar. 3, 1855	Mar. 2, 1861			
John David Stewart		Ga.	Mar. 3, 1887	Mar. 2, 1891			
William Henry Stiles		Ga.	Mar. 3, 1843	Mar. 2, 1845			
John Truman Stoddert		Md.	Dec. 1, 1833	Mar. 2, 1835			
William Brickly Stokes		Tenn.	Mar. 3, 1859	Mar. 2, 1871			
Frederick Stone		Md.	Mar. 3, 1867	Mar. 2, 1871			
James W. Stone		Ky.	Mar. 3, 1843	Mar. 2, 1853			
Michael Jenifer Stone		Md.	Mar. 3, 1789	Mar. 2, 1791			
William Stone		Tenn.	Sep. 13, 1837	Mar. 2, 1839			
Randall S. Street		N.Y.	Dec. 5, 1819	Mar. 2, 1821			
George French Strother		Va.	Nov. 30, 1817	Feb. 9, 1820			
James French Strother		Va.	Mar. 3, 1851	Mar. 2, 1853			
William Francis Strudwick		N.C.	Dec. 6, 1795	Mar. 2, 1797			
Alexander Hugh Holmes Stuart		Va.	Mar. 3, 1841	Mar. 2, 1843			
Archibald Stuart		Va.	Mar. 3, 1837	Mar. 2, 1839			
Philip Stuart		Md.	Nov. 3, 1811	Mar. 2, 1819			
Jonathan Sturges		Conn.	Mar. 3, 1789	Mar. 1, 1793			
George William Summers		Va.	Mar. 3, 1841	Mar. 2, 1845			
Thomas De Lage Sumter		S.C.	Mar. 3, 1839	Mar. 2, 1843			
Thomas Swann		Md.	Mar. 3, 1869	Mar. 2, 1879			
John Swanwick		Pa.	Dec. 6, 1795	Jul. 31, 1798			
Peter Swart		N.Y.	Oct. 26, 1807	Mar. 2, 1809			
Jacob Swoope		Va.	May. 21, 1809	Mar. 2, 1811			
Samuel Franklin Swope		Ky.	Mar. 3, 1855	Mar. 2, 1857			
Silas Talbot		N.Y.	Dec. 1, 1793	Mar. 2, 1795			
Albert Gallatin Talbott		Ky.	Mar. 3, 1855	Mar. 2, 1859			
Benjamin Taliaferro		Ga.	Dec. 1, 1799	Dec. 31, 1801			
John Taliaferro		Va.	Dec. 6, 1801	Mar. 2, 1843			
Benjamin Tallmadge		Conn.	Dec. 6, 1801	Mar. 2, 1817			
Magnus Tate		Va.	Dec. 3, 1815	Mar. 2, 1817			
Absalom Tatom		N.C.	Dec. 6, 1795	May. 31, 1796			
Edward Fenwick Tattnall		Ga.	Dec. 2, 1821	Mar. 2, 1827			
Micah Taul		Ky.	Dec. 3, 1815	Mar. 2, 1817			
John W. Taylor		N.Y.	May. 23, 1813	Mar. 1, 1833			
Miles Taylor		La.	Mar. 3, 1855	Feb. 4, 1861			
Nathaniel Green Taylor		Tenn.	Mar. 29, 1854	Mar. 2, 1867			
Robert Taylor		Va.	Dec. 4, 1825	Mar. 2, 1827			
William Taylor		Va.	Mar. 3, 1843	Jan. 16, 1846			
William Penn Taylor		Va.	Dec. 1, 1833	Mar. 2, 1835			
Thomas Telfair		Ga.	May. 23, 1813	Mar. 2, 1817			
William Temple		Del.	Mar. 3, 1863	May. 27, 1863			
James C. Terrell		Ga.	Dec. 6, 1835	Jul. 7, 1835			
William Terrell		Ga.	Nov. 30, 1817	Mar. 2, 1821			
William Terry		Va.	Mar. 3, 1871	Mar. 3, 1877			
Bannon Goforth Thibodeaux		La.	Mar. 3, 1845	Mar. 2, 1849			
Christopher Yancy Thomas		Va.	Mar. 3, 1873	Mar. 2, 1875			
David Thomas		N.Y.	Dec. 6, 1801	Apr. 30, 1808			
Francis Thomas		Md.	Dec. 4, 1831	Mar. 2, 1869			
Isaac Thomas		Tenn.	Dec. 3, 1815	Mar. 2, 1817			
James Houston Thomas		Tenn.	Mar. 3, 1847	Mar. 2, 1861			
John Chew Thomas		Md.	Dec. 1, 1799	Mar. 2, 1801			
Philemon Thomas		La.	Dec. 4, 1831	Mar. 2, 1835			
Phillip Francis Thomas		Md.	Mar. 3, 1839	Mar. 3, 1877			
William Poindexter Thomasson		Ky.	Mar. 3, 1843	Mar. 2, 1847			
Jacob Thompson		Miss.	Mar. 3, 1839	Mar. 2, 1851			
John Thompson		N.Y.	Dec. 1, 1799	Mar. 2, 1811			
Philip Thompson		Ky.	Nov. 30, 1823	Mar. 2, 1825			
Philip Rootes Thompson		Va.	Dec. 6, 1801	Mar. 2, 1807			
Robert Augustine Thompson		Va.	Mar. 3, 1847	Mar. 2, 1849			
Waddy Thompson Jr.		S.C.	Sep. 9, 1835	Mar. 2, 1841			
Wiley Thompson		Ga.	Dec. 2, 1821	Mar. 1, 1833			
James Webb Throckmorton		Tex.	Mar. 4, 1875	Mar. 2, 1887			
John Wooleston Tibbatts		Ky.	Mar. 3, 1843	Mar. 2, 1847			
Nelson Tift		Ga.	Jul. 24, 1868	Mar. 2, 1869			
George Dionysius Tillman		S.C.	Mar. 17, 1879	Mar. 3, 1893			
Lewis Tillman		Tenn.	Mar. 3, 1869	Mar. 2, 1871			
Caleb Tompkins		N.Y.	Mar. 3, 1817	Mar. 2, 1821			
Christopher Tompkins		Ky.	Dec. 4, 1831	Mar. 2, 1835			
George Washington Bonaparte Towns		Ga.	Dec. 6, 1835	Mar. 2, 1847			
George Townsend		N.Y.	Dec. 3, 1815	Mar. 2, 1819			
William Marshall Tredway		Va.	Mar. 3, 1845	Mar. 2, 1847			
Thomas Tredwell		N.Y.	Oct. 23, 1791	Mar. 2, 1795			
James Trezvant		Va.	Dec. 6, 1825	Mar. 2, 1831			
Abram Trigg		Va.	May. 14, 1797	Mar. 2, 1809			
John Johns Trigg		Va.	May. 14, 1797	Mar. 2, 1805			
David Trimble		Ky.	Nov. 30, 1817	Mar. 2, 1827			
John Trimble		Tenn.	Mar. 3, 1867	Mar. 2, 1869			
Lawrence Strother Trimble		Ky.	Mar. 3, 1865	Mar. 2, 1871			
Philip Triplett		Ky.	Mar. 3, 1839	Mar. 2, 1843			
Robert Pleasant Trippe		Ga.	Mar. 3, 1855	Mar. 2, 1859			
Samuel Wilds Trotti		S.C.	Dec. 16, 1842	Mar. 2, 1843			
Andrew Alkire Trumbo		Ky.	Mar. 3, 1845	Mar. 2, 1847			
George Tucker		Va.	Dec. 5, 1819	Mar. 2, 1825			
Henry St. George Tucker		Va.	Dec. 3, 1815	Mar. 2, 1819			
John Randolph Tucker		Va.	Mar. 4, 1875	Mar. 2, 1887			
Starling Tucker		S.C.	Nov. 30, 1817	Mar. 2, 1831			
Thomas Tudor Tucker		S.C.	Mar. 3, 1789	Mar. 1, 1793			
Tilghman Mayfield Tucker		Miss.	Mar. 3, 1843	Mar. 2, 1845			
Daniel Turner		N.C.	Dec. 2, 1827	Mar. 2, 1829			
Oscar Turner		Ky.	Mar. 17, 1879	Mar. 3, 1885			
Thomas Turner		Ky.	Mar. 4, 1877	Mar. 2, 1881			
Selah Tuthill		N.Y.	Dec. 2, 1821	Sep. 6, 1821			
Jacob Tyson		N.Y.	Nov. 30, 1823	Mar. 2, 1825			
Daniel Udree		Pa.	May. 23, 1813	Mar. 2, 1825			
John William Henderson Underwood		Ga.	Mar. 3, 1859	Jan. 22, 1861			
Charles Horace Upton		Va.	May. 22, 1861	Feb. 26, 1862			
James Isaac Van Alen		N.Y.	Oct. 25, 1807	Mar. 2, 1809			
John Evert Van Alen		N.Y.	Dec. 1, 1793	Mar. 2, 1799			
Robert Brank Vance		N.C.	Nov. 30, 1823	Mar. 2, 1825			
Robert Brank Vance		N.C.	Mar. 3, 1873	Mar. 3, 1885			
Philip Van Cortlandt		N.Y.	Dec. 1, 1793	Mar. 2, 1809			
Pierre Van Cortlandt Jr.		N.Y.	Nov. 3, 1811	Mar. 2, 1813			
Peter Van Gaasbeck		N.Y.	Dec. 1, 1793	Mar. 2, 1795			
Archibald Van Horne		Md.	Oct. 25, 1807	Mar. 2, 1811			
John Peter Van Ness		N.Y.	Dec. 6, 1801	Mar. 2, 1803			
Jeremiah Van Rensselaer		N.Y.	Mar. 3, 1789	Mar. 2, 1791			
Killian Killian Van Rensselaer		N.Y.	Dec. 1, 1801	Mar. 2, 1811			
Solomon Van Vechten Van Rensselaer		N.Y.	Dec. 5, 1819	Jan. 13, 1822			
Stephen Van Rensselaer		N.Y.	Mar. 11, 1822	Mar. 2, 1829			
Thomas Van Swearingen		Va.	Dec. 5, 1819	Aug. 18, 1822			
William William Van Wyck		N.Y.	Dec. 2, 1821	Mar. 2, 1825			
Abraham Watkins Venable		N.C.	Mar. 3, 1847	Mar. 2, 1853			
Daniel Crommelin Verplanck		N.Y.	Oct. 16, 1803	Mar. 2, 1809			
Jeremiah Wadsworth		Conn.	Mar. 3, 1789	Mar. 2, 1795			
William Henry Wadsworth		Ky.	Mar. 3, 1861	Mar. 2, 1887			
Benjamin Walker		N.Y.	Dec. 1, 1801	Mar. 2, 1803			
David Walker		Ky.	Nov. 30, 1817	Mar. 2, 1821			
Felix Walker		N.C.	Nov. 30, 1817	Mar. 2, 1823			
Francis Walker		Va.	Dec. 1, 1793	Mar. 2, 1795			
James Alexander Walker		Va.	Mar. 3, 1895	Mar. 3, 1899			
Percy Walker		Ala.	Mar. 3, 1855	Mar. 2, 1857			
Alexander Stuart Wallace		S.C.	Mar. 3, 1869	Mar. 3, 1877			
Daniel Wallace		S.C.	Jun. 11, 1848	Mar. 2, 1853			
Andrew Harrison Ward		Ky.	Dec. 2, 1866	Mar. 2, 1867			
Jonathan Ward		N.Y.	Dec. 3, 1815	Mar. 2, 1817			
William Thomas Ward		Ky.	Mar. 3, 1851	Mar. 2, 1853			
Henry Ridgely Warfield		Md.	Dec. 5, 1819	Mar. 2, 1825			
Hiram Warner		Ga.	Mar. 3, 1855	Mar. 2, 1857			
Richard Warner		Tenn.	Mar. 3, 1881	Mar. 3, 1885			
Edward Allen Warren		Ark.	Mar. 3, 1853	Mar. 2, 1859			
Lott Warren		Ga.	Mar. 3, 1839	Mar. 2, 1843			
George Corbin Washington		Md.	Dec. 2, 1827	Mar. 2, 1837			
William Henry Washington		N.C.	Mar. 3, 1841	Mar. 2, 1843			
Albert Galiton Watkins		Tenn.	Mar. 3, 1849	Mar. 2, 1859			
Anthony Wayne		Ga.	Oct. 23, 1791	Mar. 20, 1792			
Isaac Wayne		Pa.	Nov. 30, 1823	Mar. 2, 1825			
James Moore Wayne		Ga.	Dec. 6, 1829	Jan. 12, 1835			
Robert Weakley		Tenn.	May. 21, 1809	Mar. 2, 1811			
John Crompton Weems		Md.	Dec. 4, 1825	Mar. 2, 1829			
Rensselaer Westerlo		N.Y.	Nov. 30, 1817	Mar. 2, 1819			
Alexander White		Va.	Mar. 3, 1789	Mar. 1, 1793			
Alexander White		Ala.	Mar. 3, 1851	Mar. 2, 1875			
Bartow White		N.Y.	Dec. 4, 1825	Mar. 2, 1827			
David White		Ky.	Nov. 30, 1823	Mar. 2, 1825			
Edward Douglass White		La.	Dec. 6, 1829	Mar. 2, 1843			
Francis White		Va.	May. 23, 1813	Mar. 2, 1815			
John White		Ky.	Dec. 6, 1835	Mar. 2, 1845			
Thomas Whitehead		Va.	Mar. 3, 1873	Mar. 2, 1875			
John Whitehill		Pa.	Oct. 16, 1803	Mar. 2, 1807			
Robert Whitehill		Pa.	Dec. 1, 1805	Apr. 7, 1813			
Richard Henry Whiteley		Ga.	Dec. 21, 1870	Mar. 2, 1875			
George Washington Whitmore		Tex.	Mar. 3, 1869	Mar. 2, 1871			
Eliphalet Wickes		N.Y.	Dec. 1, 1805	Mar. 2, 1807			
Charles Anderson Wickliffe		Ky.	Nov. 30, 1823	Mar. 2, 1863			
Richard Henry Wilde		Ga.	Dec. 3, 1815	Mar. 2, 1835			
James Whitney Wilkin		N.Y.	Dec. 3, 1815	Mar. 2, 1819			
Benjamin Williams		N.C.	Dec. 1, 1793	Mar. 2, 1795			
Christopher Harris Williams		Tenn.	Mar. 3, 1837	Mar. 2, 1853			
David Rogerson Williams		S.C.	Dec. 1, 1805	Mar. 2, 1813			
James Wray Williams		Md.	Mar. 3, 1841	Dec. 1, 1842			
Jared Williams		Va.	Dec. 5, 1819	Mar. 2, 1825			
John Williams		N.Y.	Dec. 6, 1795	Mar. 2, 1799			
Marmaduke Williams		N.C.	Nov. 16, 1803	Mar. 2, 1809			
Robert Williams		N.C.	May. 14, 1797	Mar. 2, 1803			
Asa Hoxie Willie		Tex.	Mar. 3, 1873	Mar. 2, 1875			
Francis Willis		Ga.	Oct. 23, 1791	Mar. 1, 1793			
Edgar Campbell Wilson		Va.	Dec. 1, 1833	Mar. 2, 1835			
Ephraim King Wilson		Md.	Dec. 2, 1827	Mar. 2, 1831			
John Wilson		S.C.	Dec. 2, 1821	Mar. 2, 1827			
Nathan Wilson		N.Y.	Oct. 25, 1807	Mar. 2, 1809			
Thomas Wilson		Pa.	May. 23, 1813	Mar. 2, 1817			
Boyd Winchester		Ky.	Mar. 3, 1869	Mar. 2, 1873			
Richard Winn		S.C.	Dec. 1, 1793	Mar. 2, 1813			
Warren Winslow		N.C.	Mar. 3, 1855	Mar. 2, 1861			
Joseph Winston		N.C.	Dec. 1, 1793	Mar. 2, 1807			
Elisha I. Winter		N.Y.	May. 23, 1813	Mar. 2, 1815			
George Douglas Wise		Va.	Mar. 3, 1881	Mar. 3, 1895			
Henry Alexander Wise		Va.	Dec. 8, 1833	Feb. 11, 1844			
Robert Witherspoon		S.C.	May. 21, 1809	Mar. 2, 1811			
John Jacob Wood		N.Y.	Dec. 2, 1827	Mar. 2, 1829			
Henry Woods		Pa.	Dec. 1, 1799	Mar. 2, 1803			
Samuel Hughes Woodson		Mo.	Mar. 3, 1857	Mar. 2, 1861			
Samuel Hughes Woodson		Ky.	Dec. 2, 1821	Mar. 2, 1823			
Joseph Addison Woodward		S.C.	Mar. 3, 1843	Mar. 2, 1853			
Thomas Jefferson Word		Miss.	May. 29, 1838	Mar. 2, 1839			
John Tolley Hood Worthington		Md.	Dec. 4, 1831	Mar. 2, 1841	29+ people		
Thomas Contee Worthington		Md.	Dec. 4, 1825	Mar. 2, 1827			
Augustus Romaldus Wright		Ga.	Mar. 3, 1857	Mar. 2, 1859			
Daniel Boone Wright		Miss.	Mar. 3, 1853	Mar. 2, 1857			
John Vines Wright		Tenn.	Mar. 3, 1855	Mar. 2, 1861			
Henry Wynkoop		Pa.	Mar. 3, 1789	Mar. 2, 1791			
Thomas Wynns		N.C.	Dec. 6, 1801	Mar. 2, 1807			
Bartlett Yancey		N.C.	May. 23, 1813	Mar. 2, 1817			
Joel Yancey		Ky.	Dec. 2, 1827	Mar. 2, 1831			
William Lowndes Yancey		Ala.	Dec. 1, 1844	Aug. 31, 1846			
John Barentse Yates		N.Y.	Dec. 3, 1815	Mar. 2, 1817			
George Helm Yeaman		Ky.	Nov. 30, 1862	Mar. 3, 1865			
Archibald Yell		Ark.	Jul. 31, 1836	Jun. 30, 1846			
Bryan Rust Young		Ky.	Mar. 3, 1845	Mar. 2, 1847			
John Duncan Young		Ky.	Mar. 3, 1873	Mar. 2, 1875			
John Smith Young		La.	Mar. 4, 1877	Mar. 2, 1879			
Pierce Manning Butler Young		Ga.	Jul. 24, 1868	Mar. 2, 1875			
William Singleton Young		Ky.	Dec. 4, 1825	Sep. 19, 1827			
Felix Kirk Zollicoffer		Tenn.	Mar. 3, 1853	Mar. 2, 1859			
Thomas Day Singleton		S.C.	Dec. 1, 1833	Mar. 2, 1835			
John Adair	Democratic-Republican	Kentucky's 7th district	November 7, 1805	March 1, 1833			
Stephen Adams	Democratic	Mississippi's at-large district	March 3, 1845	March 2, 1857			
William S. Archer	Democratic-Republican	Virginia's 17th district, Virginia's 3rd district	January 17, 1820	March 2, 1847			
Robert Woodward Barnwell	Democratic	South Carolina's 2nd district	June 4, 1850	December 8, 1850	128+	Yes	
Theodorus Bailey	Anti-Administration, Democratic-Republican	New York's 5th district	March 4, 1793	March 3, 1803			
John S. Barbour Jr.	Democratic	Virginia's 8th district	March 3, 1881	March 3, 1887			
William Taylor Barry	Democratic-Republican (Before 1825) Democratic (1828–1835)	Kentucky's 5th district	March 21, 1809	March 3, 1811			
James Asheton Bayard Sr.	Federalist	Delaware's at-large district	March 4, 1797	March 3, 1803			
James Burnie Beck	Democratic	Kentucky's 7th district	March 3, 1867	March 3, 1875			
John Bell	Democratic-Republican (1817–1825) Jacksonian (1825–1835) Whig (1835–1854) American (1854–1860) Constitutional Union (1860–1861)	Tennessee's 7th district	December 2, 1827	1841			
Thomas Hart Benton	Democratic-Republican, Jacksonian, Democratic	Missouri	August 9, 1821	March 2, 1855			
William Wyatt Bibb	Democratic-Republican	Georgia	December 1, 1805	November 8, 1816			
Asa Biggs	Democratic	North Carolina	March 3, 1845	May 4, 1858			
Francis Preston Blair Jr.	Democratic (before 1848, 1866–1875) Free Soil (1848–1854) Republican (1854–1866)	Missouri's 1st district	March 3, 1857	March 2, 1873			
Timothy Bloodworth	Democratic-Republican	North Carolina's 3rd district	March 3, 1789	March 2, 1801			
John Branch	Democratic-Republican (before 1825) Jacksonian (1825–1837) Democratic (1837–1863)	North Carolina's 2nd district	March 3, 1823	March 1, 1833			
John Cabell Breckinridge	Democratic	Kentucky's 8th district	March 3, 1851	December 3, 1861			
Richard Brent	Democratic-Republican	Virginia's 17th district	December 6, 1795	December 29, 1814			
Albert Gallatin Brown	Democratic	Mississippi's 4th district	March 3, 1839	January 13, 1861			
John Brown	Democratic-Republican	Virginia's 2nd district	March 3, 1789	March 2, 1805			Also served in the Senate
John C. Calhoun	Democratic-Republican (before 1828) Democratic (1828, 1839–1850) Nullifier (1828–1839)	South Carolina's 6th district	November 3, 1811	March 30, 1850			Later became vice president.
John Snyder Carlile	Union	Virginia's 11th district	March 3, 1855	March 2, 1865			
Christopher Grant Champlin	Federalist	Rhode Island's at-large district	May 14, 1797	Oct 1, 1811			
William Charles Cole Claiborne	Democratic-Republican	Tennessee's at-large district	May 14, 1797	March 3, 1801			
Henry Clay	Democratic-Republican (1797–1825) National Republican (1825–1833) Whig (1833–1852)	Kentucky's 5th district, 2nd district, 3rd district	Dec 28, 1806	March 6, 1825			
Thomas Clayton	FederalistWhig	Delaware's first at-large district	Dec 3, 1815	March 4, 1817			
Thomas Willis Cobb	Democratic-Republican	Georgia's at-large district	Nov 30, 1817	March 3, 1821			
Alfred Holt Colquitt	Democratic	Georgia's 2nd district	Mar 3, 1853	March 3, 1855			
Walter Terry Colquitt	Democratic	Georgia's at-large district	Mar 3, 1839	March 3, 1843			
John Condit	Democratic-Republican	New Jersey's at-large district	Dec 1, 1799	Nov 3, 1819			
John Jordan Crittenden	Democratic-Republican (before 1825); National Republican (1825–1830); Whig (1830–1856); American (1856–1859) Constitutional Union (1859–1861) Union Democratic (1861–1863)	Kentucky's 8th district	March 4, 1861	Mar 2, 1863			
Alfred Cuthbert	Democratic	Georgia's at-large district	May 23, 1813	March 3, 1827			
Garrett Davis	Whig, Union Democratic, Democrat	Kentucky's 12th district	Mar. 3, 1839	March 3, 1843			
Jefferson Davis	Democratic	Mississippi's at-large district (Seat D)	Mar. 3, 1845	October 28, 1846			
William Crosby Dawson	States' Rights Party, Whig	Georgia's at-large district	Dec. 6, 1835	November 13, 1841			
Stephen Arnold Douglas	Democratic	Illinois's 5th district	Mar. 3, 1843	March 3, 1847			
Franklin Harper Elmore	Democratic	South Carolina's 4th district	Dec. 9, 1836	March 3, 1839			
John Wayles Eppes	Democratic-Republican	Virginia's 14th district	Oct. 16, 1803	Dec. 3, 1819			
George Evans	National Republican, Whig	Maine's 4th district	Dec. 6, 1829	Mar. 2, 1847			
John Forsyth	Democratic-Republican (before 1825) Democratic (1825–1841)	Georgia's 2nd district	March 4, 1827	November 7, 1827			
Jesse Franklin	Democratic-Republican	North Carolina's 3rd district	March 4, 1795	March 3, 1797			
Randall Lee Gibson	Democratic	Louisiana's 1st district	Mar. 4, 1875	March 3, 1883			
William Branch Giles	Democratic-Republican	Virginia's 9th district	Mar. 3, 1789	Mar. 2, 1815			
James Stephen Green	Democratic	Missouri's 3rd district	Mar. 3, 1847	March 3, 1851			
Felix Grundy	Democratic-Republican (Before 1825) Democratic (1825–1840)	Tennessee's 3rd district, Tennessee's 5th district	Nov. 3, 1811	July 19, 1814			
William McKendree Gwin	Democratic	Mississippi's at-large district	Mar. 3, 1841	March 3, 1843			
James Henry Hammond	Nullifier (Before 1839) Democratic (1842–1864)	South Carolina's 4th district	Mar. 3, 1835	February 26, 1836	>300	Yes	Coined "mudsill theory" and popularized the phrase "Cotton is King". Owned several plantations and sexually abused enslaved children. Later became Senator.
Alexander Contee Hanson	Federalist	Maryland's 3rd district	May. 23, 1813	December 20, 1816			
William Henry Harrison	Democratic-Republican (before 1828); Whig (1836–1841)	Ohio's 1st district	October 8, 1816	March 3, 1819	11	No (1841)	Harrison inherited several slaves. As the first governor of the Indiana Territory, he unsuccessfully lobbied Congress to legalize slavery in Indiana.
Robert Goodloe Harper	Federalist	South Carolina's 5th district	February 9, 1795	March 3, 1801			
Isham Green Harris	Democratic	Tennessee's 9th district	Mar. 4, 1849	March 3, 1853			
Benjamin Harvey Hill	Democratic, Whig (Before 1855), American (1855–1859), Constitutional Union (1859–1861)	Georgia's 9th district	Mar. 4, 1875	March 4, 1877			
Joshua Hill	American Party, Republican	Georgia's 7th district	Mar. 3, 1857	January 23, 1861			
James Hillhouse	Federalist	Connecticut's at-large district	March 4, 1791	December 5, 1796			
William Hindman	Federalist	Maryland's 2nd district, Maryland's 7th district	January 30, 1793	March 3, 1799			
David Holmes	Jacksonian, Democratic-Republican	Virginia's 2nd district, Virginia's 4th district	March 4, 1797	March 3, 1809			
George Smith Houston	Democratic	Alabama's at-large district, Alabama's 5th district	Mar. 3, 1841	January 21, 1861			
Samuel Houston	Democratic-Republican (before 1830); Democratic (1846–1854); Know Nothing (1855–1856); Independent (after 1856)	Tennessee's 7th district	Nov. 30, 1823	March 3, 1827			
Robert Mercer Taliaferro Hunter	Whig (Before 1844) Democratic (1844–1887)	Virginia's 9th district, Virginia's 8th district	Mar. 3, 1837	March 3, 1847			
Eppa Hunton	Democratic	Virginia's 8th district	Mar. 3, 1873	March 4, 1881			
Alfred Iverson Sr.	Democratic	Georgia's 2nd district	Mar. 3, 1847	March 3, 1849			
Andrew Jackson	Democratic-Republican (before 1825); Jacksonian (1825–1828); Democratic (1828–1845)	Tennessee's at-large district	Oct. 6, 1796	September 26, 1797	200	Yes (1829–1837)	Later elected president. Jackson owned many slaves. One controversy during his presidency was his reaction to anti-slavery tracts. During his campaign for the presidency, he faced criticism for being a slave trader. He did not free his slaves in his will.
Andrew Johnson	Democratic (c. 1839–1864, 1868–1875); National Union (1864–1868)	Tennessee's 1st district	Mar. 3, 1843	March 3, 1853	9	No (1865–1869)	Later became vice president and president. Johnson owned a few slaves and was supportive of James K. Polk's slavery policies. As military governor of Tennessee, he convinced Abraham Lincoln to exempt that area from the Emancipation Proclamation. Johnson went on to free all his personal slaves on August 8, 1863. On October 24, 1864, Johnson officially freed all slaves in Tennessee.
Henry Johnson	Democratic-Republican, National Republican, Whig	Louisiana's 1st district	December 1, 1834	March 3, 1839			
Richard Mentor Johnson	Democratic-Republican (before 1828) Democratic (after 1828)	Kentucky's 4th district, 3rd district, 5th district, 13th district	Mar. 3, 1807	Mar. 2, 1837			Later became vice president.
Robert Ward Johnson	Democratic	Arkansas's at-large district	Mar. 3, 1847	March 3, 1853			
Josiah Stoddard Johnston	Democratic-Republican	Louisiana's at-large district	Dec. 2, 1821	March 3, 1823			
Joseph Kent	Whig	Maryland's 2nd district	Nov. 3, 1811	Nov. 23, 1837			
John Leeds Kerr	Whig	Maryland's 7th district	Dec. 4, 1825	March 3, 1833			
William Rufus de Vane King	Democratic-Republican (before 1828), Democratic	North Carolina's 5th district	Mar. 3, 1811	November 4, 1816	~500	Yes	Later became vice president. King developed a large cotton plantation based on slave labor, calling the property "Chestnut Hill". Moving from North Carolina, King and his relatives formed one of Alabama's largest slaveholding families, collectively owning as many as 500 people. King staked a pro-slavery position in Congress.
Lucius Quintus Cincinnatus Lamar	Democratic	Mississippi's 1st district	Mar. 3, 1857	March 3, 1877			
Dixon Hall Lewis	Democratic	Alabama's 3rd district, Alabama's 4th district, Alabama's at-large district	Dec. 6, 1829	April 22, 1844			
Edward Livingston	Democratic-Republican (before 1825) Jacksonian (1825–1836)	New York's 2nd district	Dec. 6, 1795	March 3, 1801			
Edward Livingston	Democratic-Republican (before 1825) Jacksonian (1825–1836)	Louisiana's 1st district	March 4, 1823	March 3, 1829			
Edward Lloyd	Democratic-Republican, Jacksonian	Maryland's 7th district	December 3, 1806	March 3, 1809			
Wilson Lumpkin	Democratic	Georgia's at-large district	March 4, 1815	March 3, 1817			
Samuel Maclay	Democratic-Republican	Pennsylvania's 6th district	Dec. 6, 1795	Jan. 3, 1809			
Nathaniel Macon	Anti-Administration (Before 1792) Democratic-Republican (1792–1828)	North Carolina's 2nd, 5th, and 6th districts	Oct. 23, 1791	Nov. 13, 1828			
Francis Malbone	Federalist	Rhode Island's at-large district	Dec. 1, 1793	Jun. 3, 1809			
Willie Person Mangum	Democratic (before 1834); Whig (1834–1852); American (1856–1861)	North Carolina's 8th district	Nov. 30, 1823	March 18, 1826			
James Murray Mason	Democratic	Virginia's 15th district	Mar. 3, 1837	Jul. 10, 1861			
James Bennett McCreary	Democratic	Kentucky's 8th district	Mar. 3, 1885	Mar. 2, 1909			
George McDuffie	Democratic	South Carolina's 6th district, South Carolina's 5th district	Dec. 2, 1821	1834			
John McKinley	Democratic-Republican (before 1825); Democratic (1828–1852)	Alabama's 2nd district	Nov. 26, 1826	March 3, 1835			
Louis McLane	Federalist (before 1825); Jacksonian (1825–1837); Democratic (1837–1857)	Delaware's at-large district	Nov. 30, 1817	Apr. 15, 1829			
John Jones McRae	Democratic	Mississippi's 5th district	December 7, 1858	Jan. 11, 1861			
Thomas Metcalfe	National RepublicanWhig	Kentucky's 2nd district and 4th district	Dec. 5, 1819	June 1, 1828			
John Milledge	Democratic-Republican	Georgia's 1st district, at-large district	Oct. 23, 1791	May 1802			
Stephen Decatur Miller	Nullifier	South Carolina's 9th district	Dec. 3, 1815	March 3, 1819			
Roger Quarles Mills	Democratic	Texas: at-large (1873–1875) 4th district (1875–1883) 9th district (1883–1892)	Mar. 3, 1873	March 29, 1892			
Samuel Latham Mitchill	Democratic-Republican	New York's 2nd district, 3rd district	Dec. 6, 1801	Mar. 2, 1813			
Andrew Moore	Democratic-Republican	Virginia's 3rd district, 2nd district, 5th district	Mar. 3, 1789	Mar. 2, 1809			
Gabriel Moore	Democratic-Republican, Jacksonian, National Republican	Alabama's at-large district, 1st district	Dec. 2, 1821	Mar. 2, 1837			
John Peter Gabriel Muhlenberg	Democratic-Republican	Pennsylvania's at-large district, 4th district	Mar. 3, 1789	Jun. 29, 1801			
Wilson Cary Nicholas	Democratic-Republican	Virginia's 21st district	Dec. 4, 1799	Nov. 26, 1809			
Thomas Manson Norwood	Democratic	Georgia's 1st district	Nov. 13, 1871	Mar. 3, 1889			
James Alfred Pearce	Whig, Democrat	Maryland's 2nd district	Dec. 6, 1835	Dec. 19, 1862			
Isaac Samuels Pennybacker	Democratic	Virginia's 16th district	Mar. 3, 1837	Jan. 11, 1847			
Israel Pickens	Democratic	North Carolina's 11th district, 12th district	Nov. 3, 1811	Nov. 26, 1826			
Charles Pinckney	Federalist, Democratic-Republican	South Carolina's 1st district	Dec. 5, 1798	Mar. 2, 1821			
William Pinkney	Democratic-Republican	Maryland's 3rd district, 5th district	Oct. 23, 1791	April 18, 1816			
James Pleasants	Democratic-Republican	Virginia's 16th district, 17th district	Nov. 3, 1811	Dec. 14, 1822			
George Poindexter	Democratic-Republican (before 1825); Jacksonian (1825–1832); National Republican (1832–1834); Democratic (1834–1853)	Mississippi's at-large district	Oct. 25, 1807	Mar. 2, 1835			
John Pope	Democratic-Republican (as Senator); Democratic (as Governor); Whig/Independent (as Representative)	Kentucky's 7th district	March 4, 1837	March 3, 1843			
Luke Pryor	Democratic	Alabama's 8th district	Jan. 6, 1880	Mar. 3, 1885			
James Lawrence Pugh	Democratic	Alabama's 2nd district	Mar. 3, 1859	January 21, 1861			
John Randolph	Democratic-Republican	Virginia's 5th district, 16th district, 7th district, 15th district	Dec. 1, 1799	March 3, 1813			
John Henninger Reagan	Democratic	Texas's 1st district, 2nd district	Mar. 3, 1857	March 3, 1887			
Philip Reed	Democratic-Republican	Maryland	March 4, 1817	Mar. 2, 1823			
David Settle Reid	Democratic	North Carolina's 3rd district	Mar. 3, 1843	March 4, 1847			
Robert Barnwell Rhett	Democratic	South Carolina's 2nd district (1837–43), 7th district (1843–49)	Mar. 3, 1837	March 3, 1849			
George Read Riddle	Democratic	Delaware's first at-large district	Mar. 3, 1851	March 4, 1855			
Henry Moore Ridgely	Federalist Party, Jacksonian	Delaware's first at-large district	Nov. 3, 1811	March 4, 1815			
William Henry Roane	Democratic-Republican, Democratic	Virginia's 12th district	Dec. 3, 1815	March 3, 1817			
Daniel Rodney	Federalist	Delaware's second at-large district	Dec. 1, 1822	Jan. 11, 1827			
John Rowan	Democratic-Republican, Jacksonian	Kentucky's 3rd district	Oct. 25, 1807	March 3, 1809			
James Schureman	Federalist	New Jersey's at-large district	Mar. 3, 1789	Mar. 2, 1815			
Theodore Sedgwick	Federalist (1795–1813) Pro-Administration (before 1795)	Massachusetts's 4th district (1789–1793), 2nd district (1793–1795), 1st district (1795–96)	Mar. 3, 1789	Mar. 2, 1801			
James Sheafe	Federalist	New Hampshire's at-large district (Seat 1)	Dec. 6, 1799	March 3, 1801			
Jesse Speight	Democratic	North Carolina's 4th district	Dec. 6, 1829	March 3, 1837			
John Selby Spence	Whig	Maryland's 8th district	Nov. 30, 1823	March 3, 1833			
John White Stevenson	Democratic	Kentucky's 10th district	Mar. 3, 1857	March 4, 1861			
Richard Stockton	Federalist	New Jersey's 2nd district	March 4, 1813	Mar. 2, 1815			
David Stone	Democratic-Republican	North Carolina's 8th district	Dec. 1, 1799	March 3, 1801			
Thomas Sumter	Democratic-Republican	South Carolina's 4th district	Mar. 3, 1789	December 15, 1801			
John Taylor	Democratic-Republican	South Carolina's 4th district	Oct. 25, 1807	December 30, 1810			
Littleton Waller Tazewell	Anti-Administration (before 1792); Democratic-Republican (1792–1825); Jacksonian (1825–1828); Democratic (1828–1860)	Virginia's 13th district	Dec. 1, 1799	March 3, 1801			
John Burton Thompson	Whig, Know Nothing	Kentucky's 5th district	Dec. 6, 1840	March 3, 1851			
Gideon Tomlinson	Toleration (1817–1827) Democratic-Republican (1827–1828) National Republican (1828–1834) Whig (1834–1854)	Connecticut's at-large district	Dec. 5, 1819	March 3, 1827			
Robert Augustus Toombs	Whig (before 1851); Constitutional Union (1851–1853); Democratic (1853–1885)	Georgia's 8th district	Mar. 3, 1845	March 3, 1853			
George Michael Troup	Democratic-Republican, Democratic	Georgia's at-large district	Oct. 25, 1807	March 3, 1815			
Hopkins Lacy Turney	Democratic	Tennessee's 5th district	Sep. 2, 1837	March 3, 1843			
John Tyler	Democratic-Republican (1811–1828); Democratic (1828–1834); Whig (1834–1841); New Democratic-Republican (1844); Independent (1841–1844, 1844–1862)	Virginia's 23rd district	Oct. 31, 1816	March 3, 1821	29	Yes (1841–1845)	Later elected president. Tyler never freed any of his slaves and consistently supported the slaveholder's rights and the expansion of slavery during his time in political office.
Joseph Rogers Underwood	Whig	Kentucky's 3rd district	Dec. 6, 1835	March 3, 1843			
Zebulon Baird Vance	Whig/American (pre-Civil War) Conservative Party of NC (c. 1862–1872) Democratic (1872–1894)	North Carolina's 8th district	Dec. 6, 1858	March 3, 1861			
Nicholas Van Dyke	Federalist	Delaware's at-large district	Oct. 25, 1807	March 4, 1811			
Abraham Bedford Venable	Democratic-Republican, Anti-Administration	Virginia's 6th district, 7th district	Oct. 23, 1791	Jun. 6, 1804			
John Vining	Federalist	Delaware's at-large district	Mar. 3, 1789	March 3, 1793			
Jesse Wharton	Democratic-Republican	Tennessee's 3rd district	Oct. 25, 1807	March 3, 1809			
Washington Curran Whitthorne	Democratic	Tennessee's 6th district, 7th district	Mar. 3, 1871	Mar. 2, 1891			
Ephraim King Wilson II	Democratic	Maryland's 1st district	Mar. 3, 1873	March 3, 1875			

=== Delegates ===
Delelgate	Party	Territory	Term start	Term end	Approximate number of slaves held	While in office?	Notes
James Patton Anderson	Democratic	Washington Territory	Mar. 3, 1855	Mar. 2, 1857			
James Woodson Bates		Arkansas Territory	Dec. 5, 1819	Mar. 2, 1821			
Shadrack Bond	Democratic-Republican	Illinois Territory	Nov. 3, 1811	Aug. 1, 1813			
Richard Keith Call	Whig	Florida Territory	Dec. 4, 1823	Mar. 2, 1825			
José Francisco Chaves	Republican	New Mexico Territory	Mar. 3, 1865	Mar. 2, 1871			
Daniel Clark		Louisiana Territory	Dec. 1, 1805	Mar. 2, 1809			
Rufus Easton		Missouri Territory	May. 23, 1813	Mar. 2, 1817			
Thomas Marston Greene	Democratic-Republican	Mississippi Territory	Dec. 6, 1801	Mar. 2, 1803			
Joseph Marion Hernández		Florida Territory	Dec. 2, 1821	Mar. 2, 1823			
William Henry Hooper	Democratic	Utah Territory	Mar. 3, 1859	Mar. 2, 1873			
William Lattimore	Democratic-Republican	Mississippi Territory	Oct. 16, 1803	Mar. 2, 1817			
Stephen Friel Nuckolls	Democratic	Wyoming Territory	Mar. 3, 1869	Mar. 2, 1871			
Nathaniel Pope	Democratic-Republican	Illinois Territory	Dec. 3, 1815	Mar. 2, 1819			
Julien de Lallande Poydras		Louisiana Territory	May. 21, 1809	Mar. 2, 1811			
Benjamin Stephenson	Democratic Republican	Illinois Territory	May. 23, 1813	Mar. 2, 1817			
Joseph M. White		Florida Territory	Dec. 4, 1825	Mar. 2, 1837			
Henry Dodge	Democratic	Wisconsin Territory	March 4, 1841	March 3, 1845			
William Henry Harrison	Democratic-Republican (before 1828); Whig (1836–1841)	Northwest Territory	Mar. 3, 1799	May 14, 1800	11	No (1841)	Later elected president. Harrison inherited several slaves. As the first governor of the Indiana Territory, he unsuccessfully lobbied Congress to legalize slavery in Indiana.
George Wallace Jones	Democratic, Jacksonian	Michigan Territory	Mar. 3, 1835	June 15, 1836 (disputed)			
George Wallace Jones	Democratic, Jacksonian	Wisconsin Territory	December 5, 1836	January 3, 1839			
Joseph Lane	Democratic	Oregon Territory	Mar. 3, 1851	February 14, 1859			
George Poindexter	Democratic-Republican (before 1825); Jacksonian (1825–1832); National Republican (1832–1834); Democratic (1834–1853)	Mississippi Territory	Oct. 25, 1807	Mar. 2, 1835			
Jesse Burgess Thomas	National RepublicanDemocratic-Republican	Indiana Territory	Oct. 25, 1807	March 3, 1809			
David Levy Yulee	Democratic	Florida Territory	Mar. 3, 1841	March 3, 1845			

== Other national legislators ==
Delegate	Party	Office	State	Term start	Term end	Approximate number of slaves held	While in office?	Notes
William Blount	Democratic-Republican	Delegate to the Continental Congress	North Carolina	1782	1783			
Pierce Butler	Federalist, Democratic-Republican	Delegate to the Congress of the Confederation	South Carolina	May 25, 1787	September 17, 1787			
Benjamin Hawkins	Pro-Administration (1789–1791), Anti-Administration (1791–1795)	Delegate to the Congress of the Confederation	North Carolina	1781	1787			
Ralph Izard	Pro-Administration	Delegate to the Congress of the Confederation	South Carolina	November 4, 1782	November 1, 1783			
Richard Henry Lee	Anti-Administration	Delegate to the Congress of the Confederation	Virginia	November 1, 1784	October 30, 1787			
James Monroe	Democratic-Republican	Delegate to the Congress of the Confederation	Virginia	November 3, 1783	November 7, 1786	75	Yes (1817–1825)	Later elected president. Like Thomas Jefferson, Monroe condemned the institution of slavery as evil and advocated its gradual end, but still owned many slaves throughout his entire adult life, freeing only one of them in his final days. As President, he oversaw the Missouri Compromise, which admitted Missouri to the Union as a slave state in exchange for admitting Maine as a free state and banning slavery above the parallel 36°30′ north. Monroe supported sending freed slaves to the new country of Liberia; its capital, Monrovia, is named after him. See James Monroe for more details.
Robert Morris	Federalist	Delegate to the Second Continental Congress	Pennsylvania	Mar. 3, 1789	Mar. 2, 1795			
Charles Pinckney	Federalist, Democratic-Republican	Delegate to the Congress of the Confederation	South Carolina	November 1, 1784	October 30, 1787			
George Read	Federalist	Delegate to the Continental Congress	Delaware	August 2, 1774	December 17, 1777			
James Madison	Democratic-Republican	Delegate to the Congress of the Confederation	Virginia	Mar. 3, 1789	Mar. 2, 1797	100+	Yes (1809–1817)	Later elected president. Madison occasionally condemned the institution of slavery and opposed the international slave trade, but he also vehemently opposed any attempts to restrict its domestic expansion. Madison did not free his slaves during his lifetime or in his will. Paul Jennings, one of Madison's slaves, served him during his presidency and later published the first memoir of life in the White House.
Thomas Jefferson	Democratic-Republican	Delegate to the Continental Congress	Virginia	June 20, 1775	September 26, 1776	600+	Yes (1801–1809)	Most historians believe Jefferson fathered multiple slave children with the enslaved woman Sally Hemings, the likely half-sister of his late wife Martha Wayles Skelton. Despite being a lifelong slave owner, Jefferson routinely condemned the institution of slavery, attempted to restrict its expansion, and advocated gradual emancipation. As President, he oversaw the abolition of the international slave trade. See Thomas Jefferson and slavery for more details.
Thomas Jefferson	Democratic-Republican	Delegate to the Congress of the Confederation	Virginia	November 3, 1783	May 7, 1784	600+	Yes (1801–1809)	Most historians believe Jefferson fathered multiple slave children with the enslaved woman Sally Hemings, the likely half-sister of his late wife Martha Wayles Skelton. Despite being a lifelong slave owner, Jefferson routinely condemned the institution of slavery, attempted to restrict its expansion, and advocated gradual emancipation. As President, he oversaw the abolition of the international slave trade. See Thomas Jefferson and slavery for more details.
Robert Barnwell	Pro-Administration	Delegate to the Congress of the Confederation	South Carolina	November 3, 1788	March 2, 1789			
Theodorick Bland		Delegate to the Congress of the Confederation	Virginia	Mar. 3, 1789	May. 31, 1790			

== See also ==
- Lists of United States public officials who owned slaves
