= North Carolina General Assembly of 1836–1837 =

Legislative term in US state of North Carolina

61st North Carolina General Assembly (1836–1837)
| ← | 1835 | 1838–1839 | → |

Overview
- Legislative body: North Carolina General Assembly
- Jurisdiction: North Carolina, United States
- Meeting place: Raleigh
- Term: 1836

Senate
- Members: 50 Senators authorized
- Speaker: Hugh Waddell
- Clerk: Thomas J. Stone

House of Commons
- Members: 120 Delegates
- Speaker: William H. Haywood, Jr
- Clerk: Charles Manley

Sessions
- 1st: November 21, 1835 – January 23, 1836

The North Carolina General Assembly of 1836–1837 met in the Government House in Raleigh from November 21, 1836 to January 23, 1837. The assembly consisted of the 120 members of the North Carolina House of Commons and 50 senators of North Carolina Senate elected by the voters in August 1836. During the 1836 session, the legislature created Davie County, but it was not until 1842 that Davie County began sending delegates to the General Assembly. William H. Haywood, Jr was elected speaker of the House of Commons and Charles Manley was elected clerk. Hugh Waddell was elected President of the Senate and Thomas G. Stone was elected Clerk. Richard Dobbs Spaight, Jr. was the Governor in 1835 and 1836. He was elected by the previous legislature. In 1837, the Governor of North Carolina, Edward Bishop Dudley (Whig Party) from New Hanover County, was elected, for the first time, by the people vice the legislature. The Whigs would control North Carolina politics until 1850. While in power, their notable achievements included funding railroads and roads, public education, and State chartered banks.

== Qualifications for office and voting ==
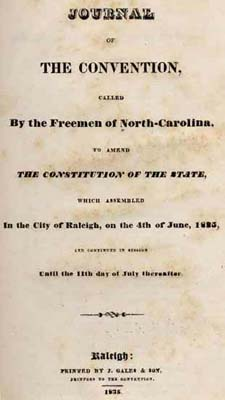
North Carolina State Constitutional Convention of 1835

Voters and office holders were required by the North Carolina constitution of 1776 to own property. The amendments to the constitution in 1835 also disqualified free blacks from voting. Free blacks were qualified to vote in the original 1776 constitution.

The specific wording in the amended constitution, Article 1, Section 3, is as follows:

- "1. Each member of the Senate shall have usually resided in the district for which he is chosen for one year immediately preceding his election, and for the same time shall have possessed and continue to possess in the district which he represents, not less than three hundred acres of land in fee."
- "2. All free men of the age of twenty-one years, (except as is hereinafter declared) who have been inhabitants of any one district within the State twelve months immediately preceding the day of any election, and possessed of a freehold within the same district of fifty acres of land, for six months next before and at the day of election, shall be entitled to vote for a member of the Senate."
- "3. No free negro, free mulatto, or free person of mixed blood, descended from negro ancestors to the fourth generation inclusive, (though one ancestor of each generation may have been a white person,) shall vote for members of the Senate or House of Commons."

The religious qualifications for office were expanded to include the following statement:

- "The Thirty-second Section of the Constitution shall be amended to read as follows: No person who shall deny the being of God, or the truth of the Christian Religion, or the divine authority of the Old or New Testament, or who shall hold Religious principles incompatible with the freedom or safety of the State, shall be capable of holding any office or place of trust or profit in the Civil department within this State."

Members of the House of Commons and Senate were elected every two years, starting with an election in 1835 for the 1836–1837 session of the general assembly.

== Laws passed by the general assembly ==
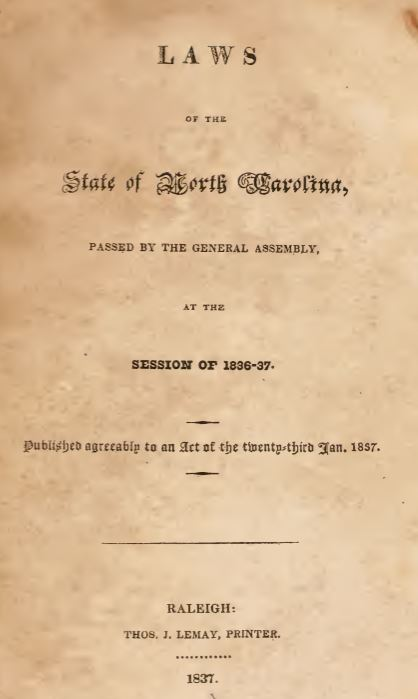
Laws of the State of North Carolina enacted by the General Assembly in 1836-1837

The State treasure had a balance of $55,113.06 on deposit on January 19, 1837, including $25,192.04 in the literary fund. In 1836, the federal government gave North Carolina $1.5 M from sale of western lands. The following laws, acts, and resolutions were passed by the general assembly:

- A law regulating chartered banks
- Created Davie County from Rowan County
- Authorized incorporating unsurveyed lands acquired from treaties with the Cherokees in 1817 and 1819 into Haywood and Macon Counties
- Limited corporations chartered by the State to terms of no more than 30 years
- Encouraged the manufacture of silk and sugar through financial incentives
- An act to make administration of justice more uniform and convenient in the Superior and County courts
- A law defining the qualifications and duties of the North Carolina justice of the peace
- An act consolidating the pilots and commissioners of navigation
- An act that enrolled all free white males between the ages of 18 and 45 in the State Militia. Exceptions were given for certain public officials and other occupations. Free black males could only be enrolled as musicians in the militia. The division, brigade, and regiment structure of the militia was prescribed and included each county.
- An act giving the North Carolina Secretary of State the duties of contracting for the publishing of laws of the legislature
- An act increasing the stock of the Halifax and Weldon Rail Road Company
- An act amending the charter of the Portsmouth and Roanoke Rail Road Company; the charter of the Cape Fear, Yadkin and Pedee Rail Road Company; and the charter of the Louisville, Cincinnati and Charleston Rail Road Company
- Acts to incorporate the Norfolk and Edenton Rail Road Company; and the North Carolina Central Rail Road Company; and the Raleigh and Columbia Rail Road Company
- An Act to lay off and construct a State Road from the town of Franklin, in Macon county, across the Nantahala mountain, to Valley River, and thence to the Georgia line.
- An Act to provide for the collection and management of revenue for the State.
- Acts concerning the Treasurer of the State and the Comptroller of the State
- Acts to incorporate the Caldwell Institute, in the town of Greensborough, North Carolina; the Cane Creek Farmers' and Mechanics' Cotton Manufacturing Company of Orange and Chatham; the General Mining and Manufacturing Association; the town of Greensborough, North Carolina in the county of Guilford; the Milton Manufacturing Corporation; the Mutual Insurance Company of Fayetteville; the Rockfish Manufacturing Company of Fayetteville; the town of Rolesville, North Carolina; and the Salem Manufacturing Company
- An Act to emancipate Henry, Fanny and John, the slaves and children of Miles Howard: Miles Howard (1799–1857) was a freed slave in Halifax, North Carolina. He was a barber and musician and owned land in Halifax.
- An Act to emancipate Isaac, a slave.
- An Act to authorize William L. Blount and his associates to erect a Bridge across Great Contentena Creek, near Washington Ferry, on said Creek
- An Act to authorize Ebenezer Pettigrew, of the county of Tyrrel, to build bridge across Scuppernong River, in the county of Washington
- An Act for the relief of John Timson, a native Cherokee Indian, and his family.
- Resolved, by the General Assembly, That the President and Directors of the Literary Fund of North Carolina, be instructed to digest a plan for common schools, suited to the condition and resources of this State, and report the same to the next General Assembly.

== General Assembly selected offices ==
The General Assembly elected the following Councilors of State on December 28, 1836:

- James Watt, Rockingham County
- George Williamson, Caswell County
- Allen Rogers, Wake County (President)
- Christopher C. Battle (Secretary of the Council)
- Archibald H. Davis, Franklin County
- Allen Goodwin, Chatham County
- Charles, E. Johnson, Chowan County (selected on January 3, 1837)
- Francis L. Dancy, Edgecombe County (selected on January 3, 1837)

William Hill, elected in 1811, continued to serve as Secretary of State. Samuel F. Patterson, elected in 1835, continued to serve as North Carolina State Treasurer. John Reeves Jones Daniel, elected in 1835, continued to serve as North Carolina Attorney General.

== Members of the legislature ==
=== House of Commons ===
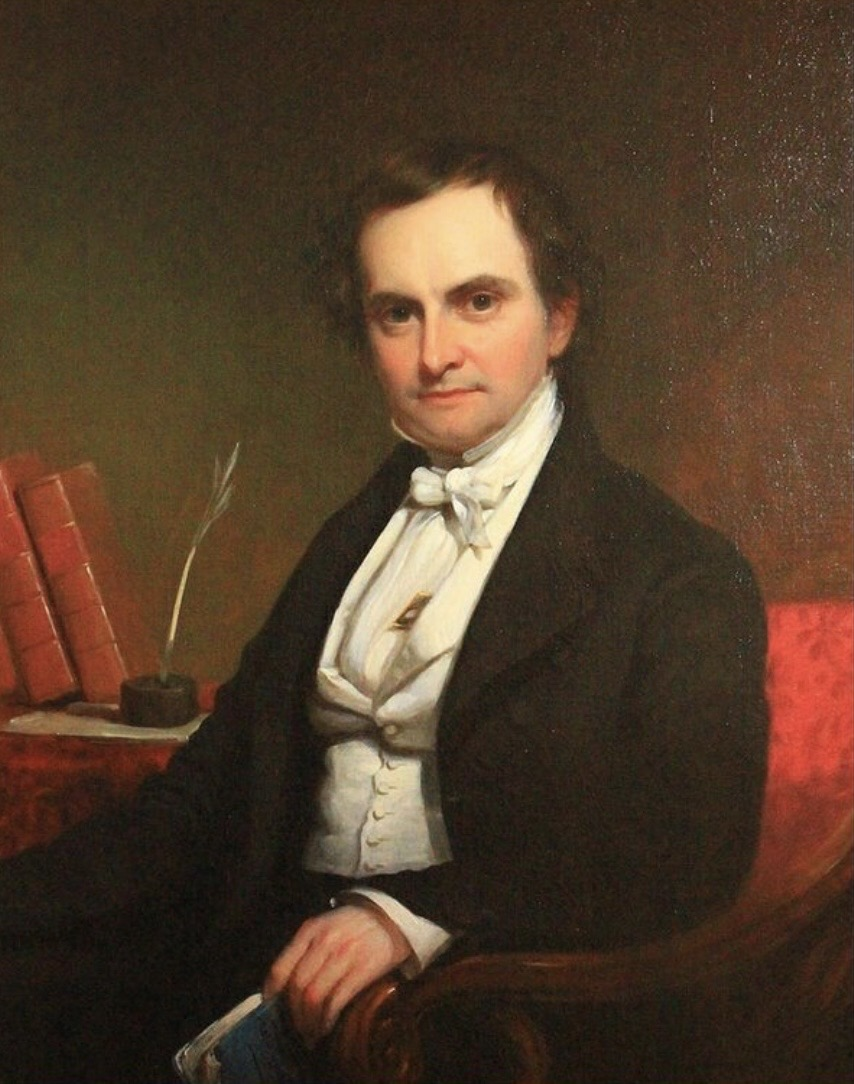
Speaker of the House of Commons William Henry Haywood, Jr

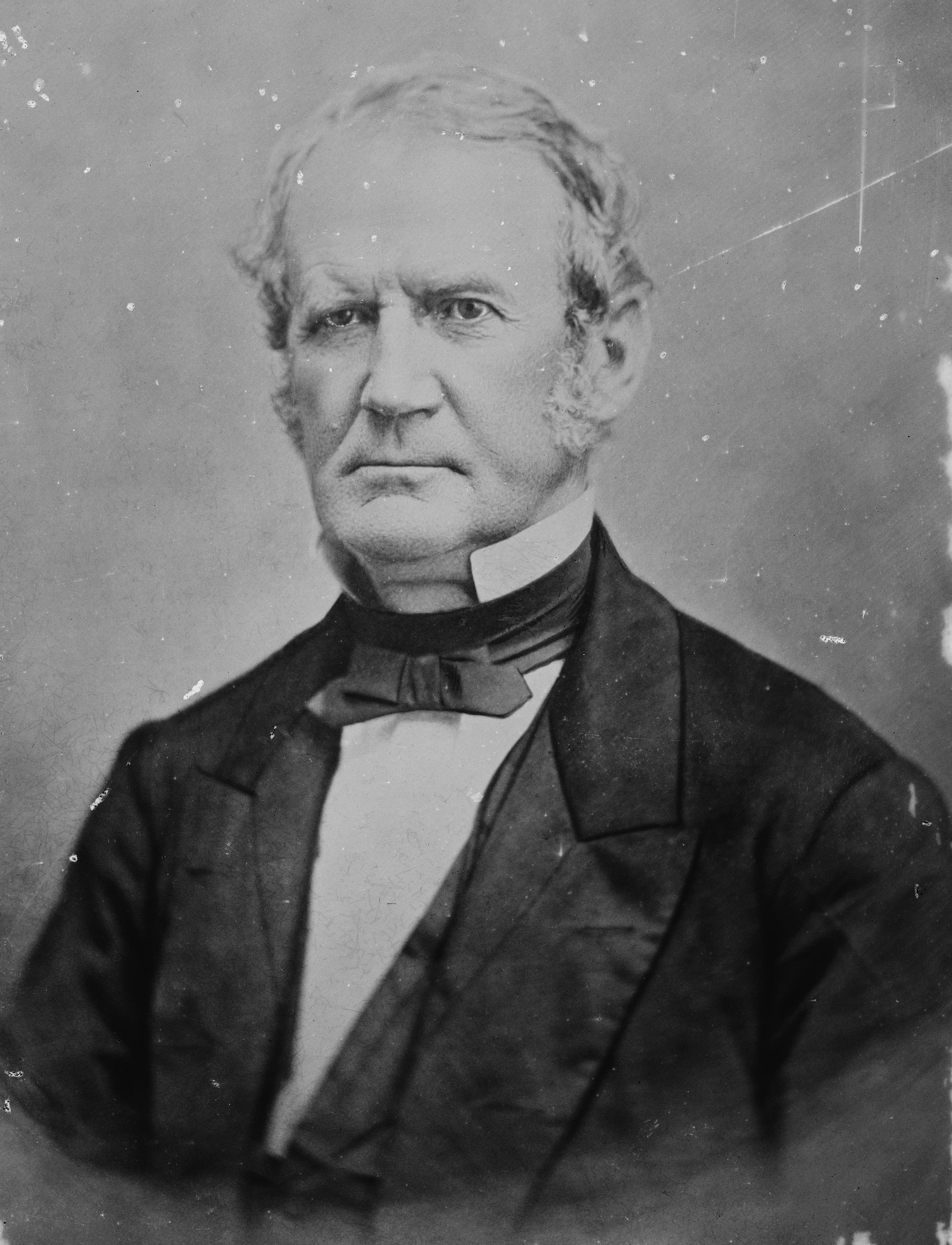
Rep. William Alexander Graham

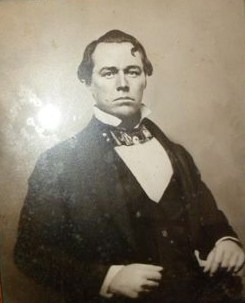
Rep. Owen Rand Kenan

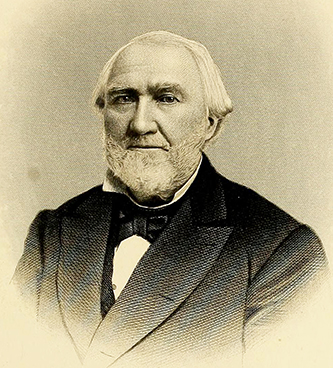
Rep. Bartholomew Figures Moore

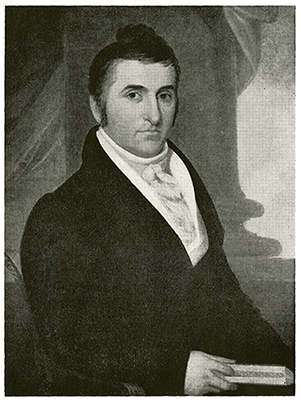
Rep. Joseph John Daniel

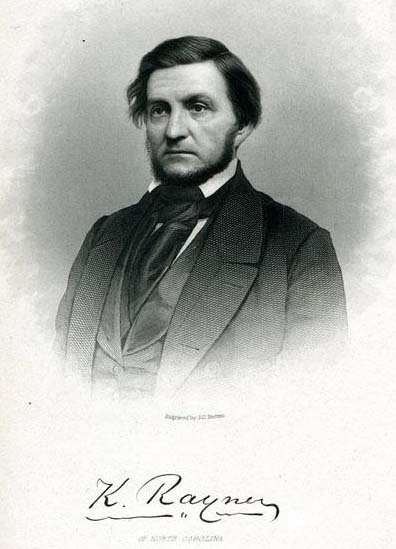
Rep. Kenneth Rayner

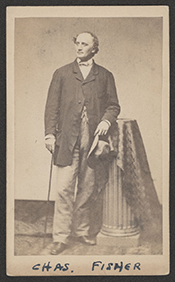
Rep. Charles Fisher

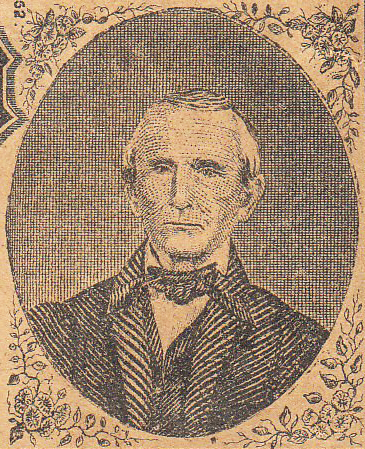
Rep. Daniel William Courts

Per the 1835 Constitution of North Carolina Convention, the House of Commons was authorized a total of one hundred-twenty delegates. Each county was authorized a minimum of one delegate, while the most populous counties were authorized four delegates. Members no longer included representatives from the boroughs or districts (Edenton, Halifax, Hillsborough, New Bern, Salisbury, and Wilmington). Each delegate was elected for a two-year term of office.

| County | No of House Members | House of Commons Members (party in 1836) |
|---|---|---|
| Anson | 2 | John A. McRae |
| Anson | 2 | John Grady |
| Ashe | 1 | James M. Nye |
| Beaufort | 2 | F.C. Satterthwaite |
| Beaufort | 2 | S. Smallwood |
| Bertie | 2 | John F. Lee |
| Bertie | 2 | Thomas H. Speller |
| Bladen | 1 | Joseph M. Gillespie |
| Brunswick | 1 | Frederick Jones Hill (Whig) |
| Buncombe | 2 | Montreville Patton |
| Buncombe | 2 | John Clayton |
| Burke | 3 | Edward J. Erwin |
| Burke | 3 | E. P. Miller |
| Burke | 3 | James H. Perkins |
| Cabarrus | 1 | William S. Harris |
| Camden | 1 | D. Pritchard |
| Carteret | 1 | Thomas Marshall |
| Caswell | 2 | Littleton A. Gwinn |
| Caswell | 2 | William A. Lea |
| Chatham | 3 | R.C. Cotten |
| Chatham | 3 | John S. Guthrie |
| Chatham | 3 | Spencer McClennahan |
| Chowan | 1 | Thomas S. Hoskins |
| Columbus | 1 | J. Maultsby |
| Craven | 2 | Abner Hartley |
| Craven | 2 | Abner Neale |
| Cumberland | 2 | Stephen Hollingsworth |
| Cumberland | 2 | Dillon Jordan |
| Currituck | 1 | Alfred Perkins |
| Davidson | 2 | Charles Brummell |
| Davidson | 2 | Meshack Pinckston |
| Duplin | 2 | Owen Rand Kenan (Democrat) |
| Duplin | 2 | James H. Jarman |
| Edgecombe | 2 | Joseph John Daniel |
| Edgecombe | 2 | James George |
| Franklin | 2 | Thomas Howerton |
| Franklin | 2 | Joseph J. Maclin |
| Gates | 1 | Whitmell Stallings |
| Granville | 3 | Charles R. Eaton |
| Granville | 3 | William Fleming |
| Granville | 3 | Robert B. Gilliam |
| Greene | 1 | Thomas Hooker |
| Guilford | 3 | Peter Adams |
| Guilford | 3 | Jesse H. Lindsay |
| Guilford | 3 | F. L. Simpson |
| Halifax | 3 | S.H. Gee |
| Halifax | 3 | I. Matthews |
| Halifax | 3 | Bartholomew Figures Moore (Whig) |
| Haywood | 1 | John L. Smith |
| Hertford | 1 | Kenneth Rayner (Whig) |
| Hyde | 1 | Tillman Farrow |
| Iredell | 3 | Theophilus M. Campbell |
| Iredell | 3 | James A. King |
| Iredell | 3 | Solomon Lowdermilk |
| Johnston | 2 | James Tomlinson |
| Johnston | 2 | Kedar Whitley |
| Jones | 1 | James W. Howard |
| Lenoir | 1 | Windall Davis |
| Lincoln | 4 | Henry Cansler |
| Lincoln | 4 | Michael Hoke |
| Lincoln | 4 | O. W. Holland |
| Lincoln | 4 | Thomas Ward |
| Macon | 1 | James W. Gwinn |
| Martin | 1 | Raleigh Roebuck |
| Mecklenburg | 3 | Green Washington Caldwell (Democrat) |
| Mecklenburg | 3 | J. A. Dunn |
| Mecklenburg | 3 | James M. Hutchison |
| Montgomery | 2 | William Harris |
| Montgomery | 2 | Encoh Jordan |
| Moore | 1 | John A.D. McNeill |
| Nash | 1 | Henry Blount |
| New Hanover | 2 | Charles Henry |
| New Hanover | 2 | John R. Walker |
| Northampton | 2 | Roderick B. Gary |
| Northampton | 2 | Herod Faison |
| Onslow | 1 | John A. Averitt |
| Orange | 4 | John Boon |
| Orange | 4 | William Alexander Graham (Whig) |
| Orange | 4 | Nathaniel J. King |
| Orange | 4 | John Stockard |
| Pasquotank | 1 | David H. Kenyan |
| Perquimans | 1 | Josiah T. Granberry |
| Person | 2 | Moses Chambers |
| Person | 2 | James M. Williamson |
| Pitt | 2 | Macon Moye |
| Pitt | 2 | John Spiers |
| Randolph | 2 | Michael Cox |
| Randolph | 2 | William B. Lane |
| Richmond | 2 | John McAllister |
| Richmond | 2 | George Thomas |
| Robeson | 2 | Oliver K. Tuton |
| Robeson | 2 | Alexander Watson |
| Rockingham | 2 | Blake W. Brasswell |
| Rockingham | 2 | Philip Irion |
| Rowan | 3 | John Clements |
| Rowan | 3 | William D. Crawford |
| Rowan | 3 | Charles Fisher (Democrat) |
| Rutherford | 3 | John H. Bedford |
| Rutherford | 3 | Thomas Jefferson |
| Rutherford | 3 | William J. T. Miller |
| Sampson | 2 | Isaac W. Lane |
| Sampson | 2 | Dickson Sloan |
| Stokes | 3 | James M. Covington |
| Stokes | 3 | Peter Critz |
| Stokes | 3 | Caleb H. Matthews |
| Surry | 3 | James Calloway |
| Surry | 3 | Daniel William Courts (Democrat) |
| Surry | 3 | P. B. Roberts |
| Tyrrell | 1 | Silas Davenport |
| Wake | 3 | Weston Raleigh Gales |
| Wake | 3 | William Henry Haywood, Jr. (Democrat, Speaker) |
| Wake | 3 | Nathaniel G. Rand |
| Warren | 2 | John H. Hawkins |
| Warren | 2 | Thomas I. Judkins |
| Washington | 1 | Joshua T. Swift |
| Wayne | 2 | Calvin Coor |
| Wayne | 2 | Raiford Whitney |
| Wilkes | 2 | Wiliam Horton |
| Wilkes | 2 | John Watts |
| Yancey | 1 | Samuel Byrd |

=== Senate members ===
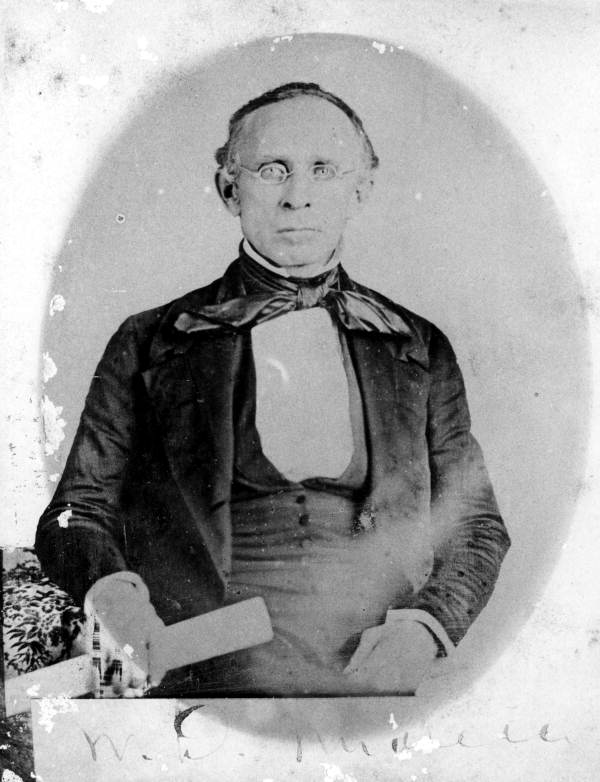
Sen. William Dunn Moseley

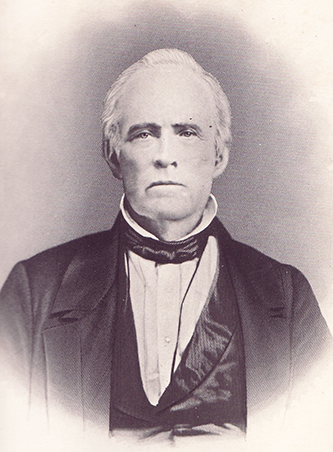
Sen. John Davis Hawkins

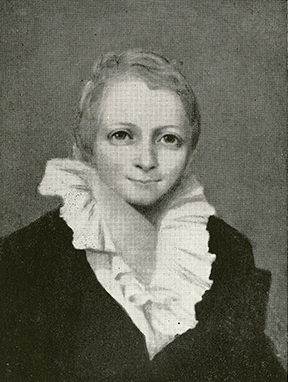
Sen Hugh Waddell

As a result of 1835 amendments to the Constitution of North Carolina, the Senate was authorized a total of fifty delegates from fifty districts apportioned on approximately equal populations. After each U.S. Census, these districts were to be adjusted, again based on approximately equal populations. Each delegate was elected for a two-year term of office. There was no lieutenant governor in 1836. Hugh Waddell was President of the Senate.

| District | Counties represented | Senator (home county) |
|---|---|---|
| 1 | Pasquotank & Persquimans | John M. Skinner (Pasquotank) |
| 2 | Camden & Currituck | Daniel Lindsay (Currituck) |
| 3 | Chowan & Gates | William W. Cowper (Gates) |
| 4 | Tyrrell & Washington | Hezekiah G. Spruill (Tyrrell) |
| 5 | Northampton | William Moody |
| 6 | Hertford | George W. Montgomery |
| 7 | Bertie | Alexander W. Mebane |
| 8 | Martin | Jesse Cooper |
| 9 | Halifax | Andrew Joyner |
| 10 | Nash | Samuel L. Arrington |
| 11 | Wake | Samuel Whitaker |
| 12 | Franklin | John Davis Hawkins |
| 13 | Johnston | Josiah Houlder |
| 14 | Warren | Weldon Nathaniel Edwards |
| 15 | Edgecombe | Thomas H. Hall |
| 16 | Wayne | John Exum |
| 17 | Greene & Lenoir | William Dunn Moseley (Lenoir) |
| 18 | Pitt | Alfred Moye |
| 19 | Beaufort & Hyde | James O'Kelly Williams (Beaufort) |
| 20 | Carteret & Jones | James West Bryan (Carteret) |
| 21 | Craven | John M. Bryan |
| 22 | Chatham | William Albright |
| 23 | Granville | John C. Taylor |
| 24 | Person | John Barnett |
| 25 | Cumberland | Duncan McCormick |
| 26 | Sampson | Thomas Bunting |
| 27 | New Hanover | Louis H. Marsteller |
| 28 | Duplin | John E. Hussey |
| 29 | Onslow | Daniel S. Saunders |
| 30 | Bladen, Brunswick, & Columbus | James Burney (Columbus) |
| 31 | Richmond & Robeson | Alfred Dockery (Richmond) |
| 32 | Anson | Absalom Myers |
| 33 | Cabarrus | Christopher Melchor |
| 34 | Montgomery & Moore | John B. Kelley (Moore) |
| 35 | Caswell | James Kerr |
| 36 | Rockingham | David S. Reid |
| 37 | Orange | Hugh Waddell (Whig, President of the Senate) |
| 38 | Randolph | Jonathan Redding |
| 39 | Guilford | James T. Morehead |
| 40 | Stokes | Matthew R. Moore |
| 41 | Rowan | Thomas Gilchrist Polk (Chairman of the Committee of Finance) |
| 42 | Davidson | John L. Hargrove |
| 43 | Surry | William P. Dobson |
| 44 | Ashe & Wilkes | Edmund Jones (Wilkes) |
| 45 | Burke & Yancey | Thomas Baker (Yancey) |
| 46 | Lincoln | Michael Reinhardt |
| 47 | Iredell | George F. Davidson |
| 48 | Rutherford | Joseph Carson, M.D. |
| 49 | Buncombe, Haywood, & Macon | James Gudger (Buncombe) |
| 50 | Mecklenburg | Stephen Fox |

== See also ==
- List of North Carolina state legislatures
