= North Carolina General Assembly of 1835 =

Legislative term in US state of North Carolina

60th North Carolina General Assembly (1835)
←	1834-1835	1836–1837	→

Overview
- Legislative body: North Carolina General Assembly
- Jurisdiction: North Carolina, United States
- Meeting place: Raleigh
- Term: 1835

Senate
- Members: 65 Senators (one per county)
- Speaker: William D. Moseley
- Clerk: William J. Cowan
- Assistant Clerk: Daniel Coleman
- Doorkeeper: Thomas B. Wheel
- Assistant Doorkeeper: Green Hill

House of Commons
- Members: 137 Delegates
- Speaker: William H. Haywood, Jr
- Clerk: Charles Manley
- Assistant Clerk: Edmund B. Freeman
- Doorkeeper: Isaac Truitt
- Assistant Doorkeeper: John Cooper

Sessions
- 1st: November 16, 1835 – December 22, 1835

The North Carolina General Assembly of 1835 met in Raleigh from November 16, 1835 to December 22, 1835. The assembly consisted of the 137 members of the North Carolina House of Commons and 65 senators of North Carolina Senate elected by the voters in August 1835. This was the last assembly elected before the amendments to the Constitution of North Carolina from the North Carolina Constitutional Convention of 1835 took effect. Thus, the House of Commons included representatives from towns (also called Districts) and the number of members of the house was greater than 120. William H. Haywood, Jr was elected speaker of the House of Commons and Charles Manley was elected clerk. William D. Mosely was elected President of the Senate and William J. Cowan was elected Clerk. Richard Dobbs Spaight, Jr. was elected the Governor by the assembly and served from December 10, 1835 to December 31, 1836. He was the last governor of North Carolina to be elected by the General Assembly.

== Councilors of State ==
The General Assembly elected the following individuals to the Council of State on December 4, 1835:

- Allen Rogers, Wake County (elected President of the Council)
- Thomas B. Haywood (elected Secretary of the Council)
- William Shepperd Ashe, New Hanover County
- Peter H. Dillard, Rockingham County
- Louis D. Henry, Cumberland County (Note: Louis D. Henry resigned on July 16, 1836)
- Henry Skinner, Perquimans County
- Daniel Turner, Warren County
- George Williamson, Caswell County

William Hill continued to serve as the North Carolina Secretary of State Samuel F. Patterson was elected by the assembly to serve as North Carolina State Treasurer in 1835. John Reeves Jones Daniel was elected to serve as North Carolina Attorney General.

== Membership of the assembly ==
=== House of Commons members ===
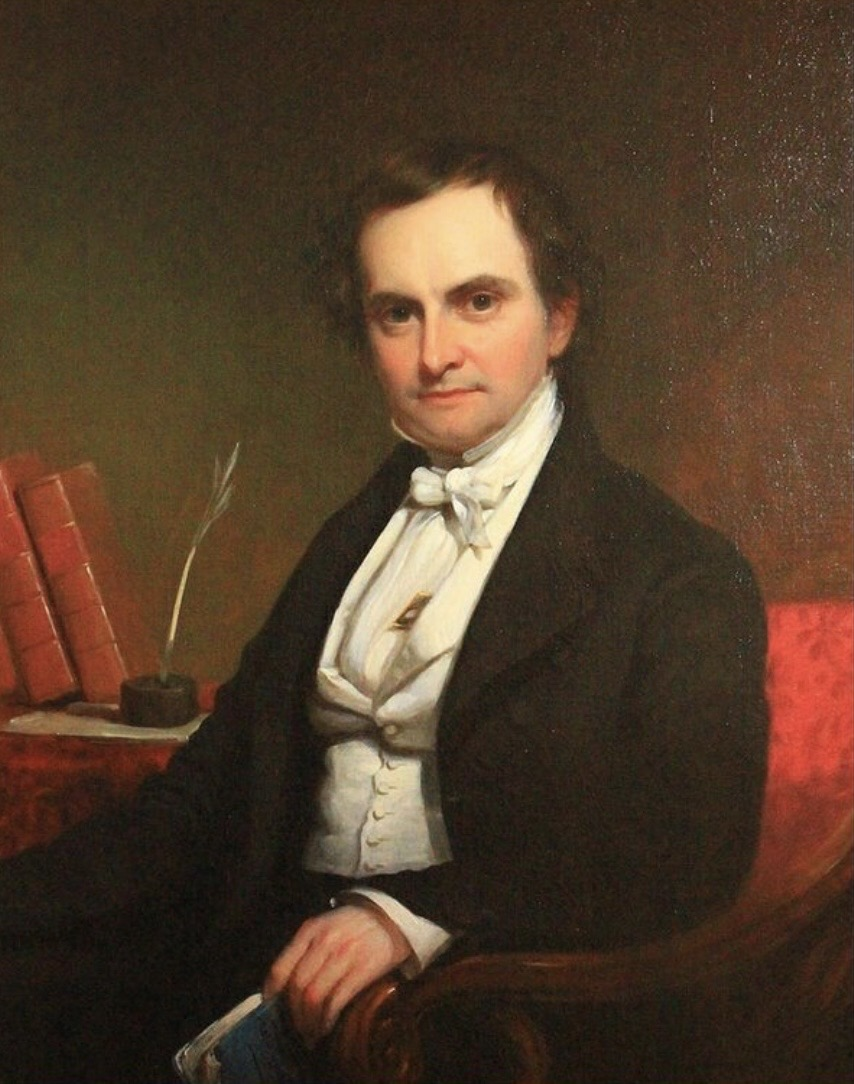
Speaker of the House of Commons William Henry Haywood, Jr

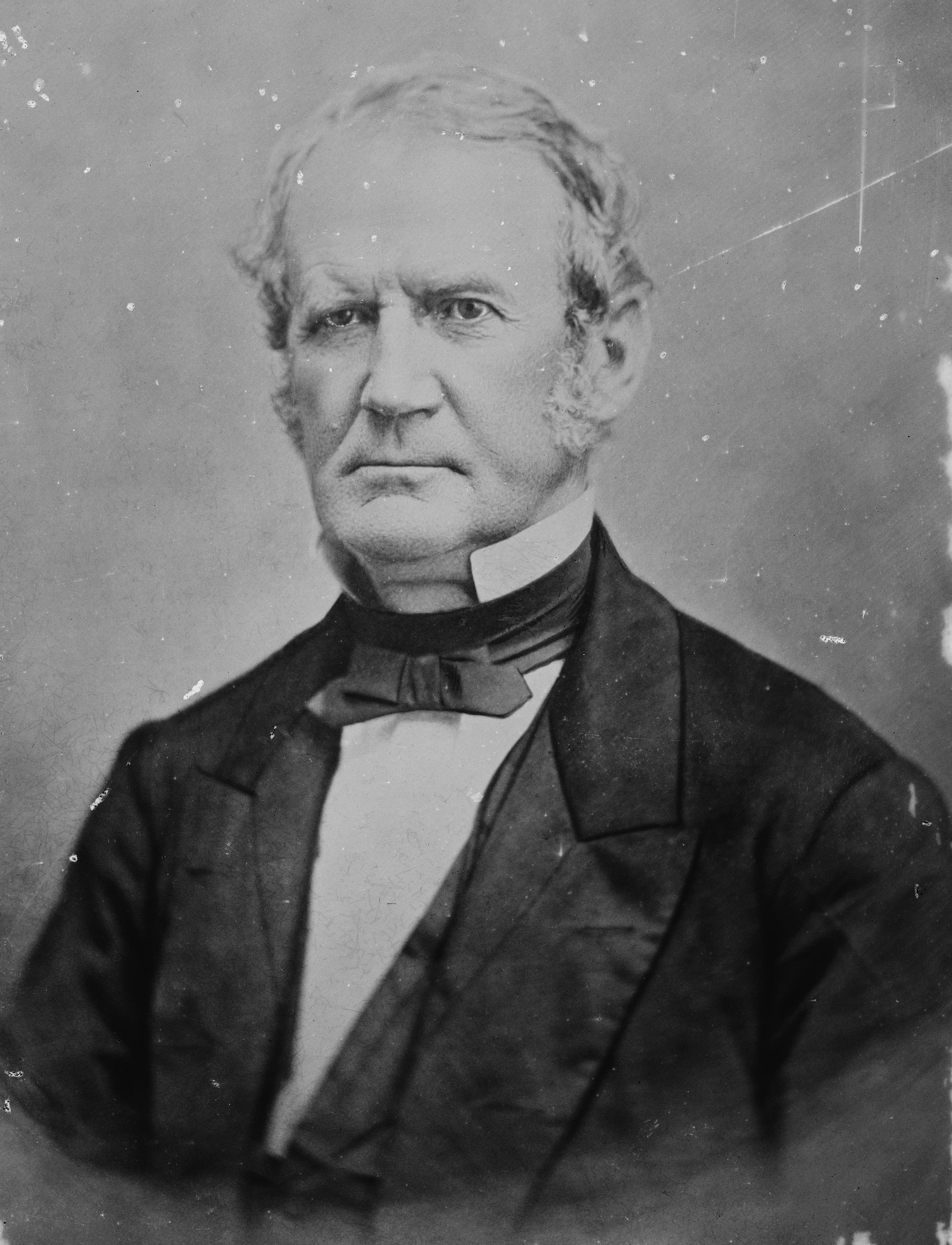
Rep. William Alexander Graham

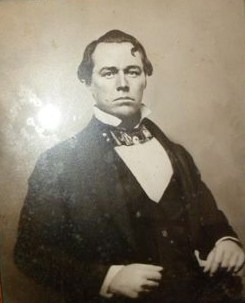
Rep. Owen Rand Kenan

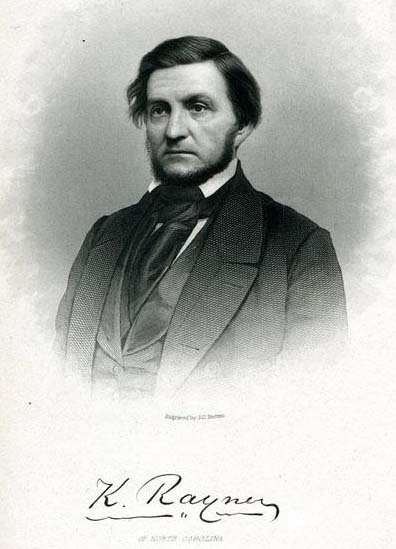
Rep. Kenneth Rayner

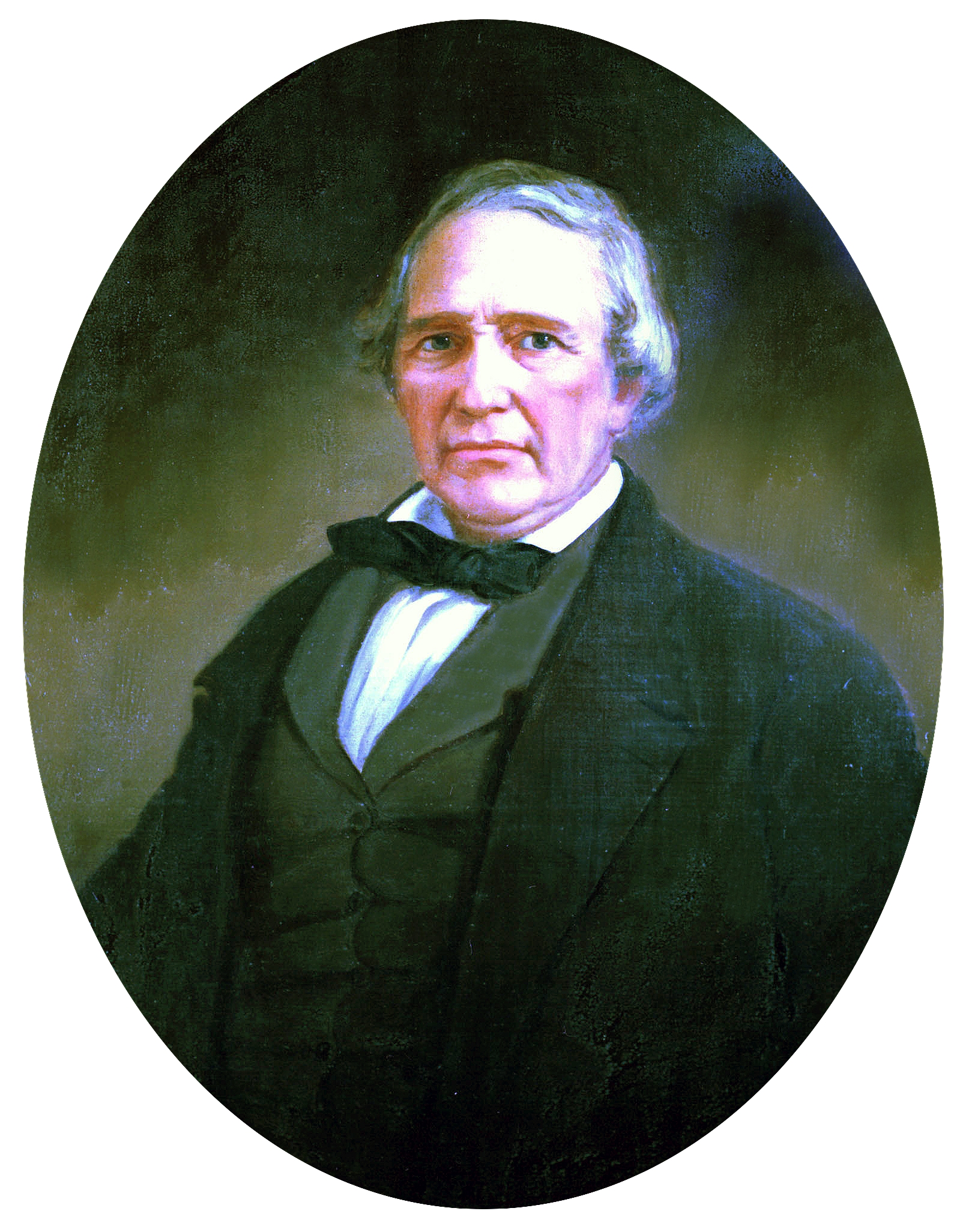
Edward Bishop Dudley

There were 137 delegates in the House of Commons, two from each of the 65 counties and one from each of the seven towns/Districts. They elected William H. Haywood, Jr. from Wake County as their Speaker and Charles Manly from Wake County as their Clerk.

County/Town	Delegate
Anson	Jeremiah Benton
Anson	John A. McRae
Ashe	Jonathan Horton
Ashe	Taliaferro Witcher
Beaufort	Henry S. Clark
Beaufort	S. Smallwood
Bertie	John F. Lee
Bertie	Thomas H. Speller
Bladen	B. Fitzrandolph
Bladen	Robert Lyon
Brunswick	Abram Baker
Brunswick	William R. Hall
Buncombe	Nathaniel Harrison
Buncombe	Joseph Pickett
Burke	Edward J. Erwin
Burke	James H. Perkins
Cabarrus	George Barnhardt
Cabarrus	Levi Hope
Camden	J.S. Burgess
Camden	James N. McPherson
Carteret	James W. Hunt
Carteret	Thomas Marshall
Caswell	Stephen Dodson
Caswell	Littleton A. Gwinn
Chatham	R.C. Cotten
Chatham	John S. Guthrie
Chowan	William Beyrum
Chowan	Thomas S. Hoskins
Columbus	Thomas Frink
Columbus	Marmaduke Powell
Craven	John M. Bryan
Craven	Abner Neale
Cumberland	Dillon Jordan
Cumberland	David McNeill
Currituck	Joshua Harrison
Currituck	Alfred Perkins
Davidson	Charles Brummell
Davidson	George Smith
Duplin	James K. Hill
Duplin	Owen Rand Kenan
Edgecombe	S. DeBerry
Edgecombe	Joseph J. Pipkin
Franklin	Thomas Howerton
Franklin	Simon G. Jeffreys
Gates	Lemuel Riddick
Gates	Whitmell Stallings
Granville	Charles R. Eaton
Granville	Elijah Hester
Greene	James Harper
Greene	Thomas Hooker
Guilford	Ralph Gorrell
Guilford	Jesse H. Lindsay
Halifax	Sterling H. Gee
Halifax	William M. West
Haywood	John L. Smith
Haywood	Joseph H. Walker
Hertford	R.C. Borland
Hertford	Kenneth Rayner
Hyde	R.M.G. Moore
Hyde	John L. Swindell
Iredell	James A. King
Iredell	Solomon Lowdermilk
Johnston	James Tomlinson
Johnston	Kedar Whitley
Jones	John H. Hammond
Jones	James W. Howard
Lenoir	Windall Davis
Lenoir	Council Wooten
Lincoln	Henry Cansler
Lincoln	Michael Hoke
Macon	James W. Gwinn
Macon	Jacob Siler
Martin	Raleigh Roebuck
Martin	Alfred M. Slade
Mecklenburg	J.A. Dunn
Mecklenburg	James M. Hutchison
Montgomery	William Harris
Montgomery	Peter R. Lilley
Moore	John O. Kelly
Moore	John A.D. McNeill
Nash	Samuel Brown
Nash	Ford Taylor
New Hanover	Charles Henry
New Hanover	John R. Walker
Northampton	William E. Crump
Northampton	Roderick B. Gary
Onslow	Daniel S. Sanders
Onslow	Daniel Thompson
Orange	James Forest
Orange	John Stockard
Pasquotank	Thomas Bell
Pasquotank	John B. Muse
Perquimans	Josiah T. Granberry
Perquimans	Jonathan H. Jacocks
Person	Robert Jones
Person	James M. Williamson
Pitt	J.L. Foreman
Pitt	Macon Moye
Randolph	William B. Lane
Randolph	Zebedee Rush
Richmond	John R. Buie
Richmond	George Thomas
Robeson	Oliver K. Tuton
Robeson	Alexander Watson
Rockingham	Blake W. Brasswell
Rockingham	Philip Irion
Rowan	John Clements
Rowan	Jesse W. Wharton
Rutherford	John H. Bedford
Rutherford	Joseph M.D. Carson
Sampson	Isaac W. Lane
Sampson	Dickson Sloan
Stokes	Caleb H. Matthews
Stokes	John F. Poindexter
Surry	Thomas L. Clingman
Surry	Mordecai Fleming
Tyrrell	Thomas Hassell
Tyrrell	Charles McCleese
Wake	William Henry Haywood, Jr.
Wake	Allen Rogers
Warren	John H. Hawkins
Warren	Thomas I. Judkins
Washington	A. Davenport
Washington	Uriah H. Swanner
Wayne	Calvin Coor
Wayne	Giles Smith
Wilkes	William Horton
Wilkes	Benjamin F. Martin
Yancey	Samuel Byrd
Yancey	May Jervis
Town of Edenton	Hugh W. Collins
Town of Fayetteville	Thomas L. Hybart
Town of Halifax	Robert C. Bond
Town of Hillsborough	William Alexander Graham
Town of New Bern	Matthias Evans Manly
Town of Salisbury	William Chambers
Town of Wilmington	Edward Bishop Dudley (Note: Edward Bishop Dudley is referred to as Edward M. Dudley in some references.)

=== Senate members ===
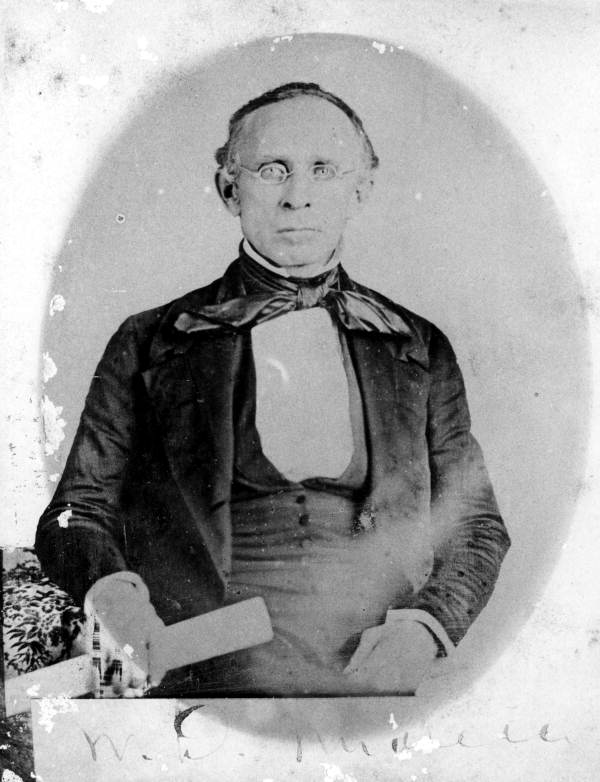
Sen. William Dunn Moseley

There were 65 Senators in the Senate, one from each of the 65 counties in North Carolina.

County/Town	Senator
Anson	Alexander Little
Ashe	John Gambill
Beaufort	James O'Kelly Williams
Bertie	Alexander W. Mebane
Bladen	George Cromartie
Brunswick	Frederick Jones Hill
Buncombe	Hodge Rabun
Burke	Peter Ballew
Cabarrus	David Long
Camden	Thomas Tillett
Carteret	James West Bryan
Caswell	James Kerr
Chatham	Hugh McQueen
Chowan	William Bullock
Columbus	Caleb Stephens
Craven	Thomas J. Pasteur
Cumberland	Duncan McCormick
Currituck	Daniel Lindsay, Jr.
Davidson	John A. Hogan
Duplin	John E. Hussey
Edgecombe	Benjamin Sharpe
Franklin	Henry G. Williams
Gates	William W. Cowper
Granville	James Wyche
Greene	Wyatt Moye
Guilford	James T. Morehead
Halifax	Andrew Joyner
Haywood	Ninian Edmonston
Hertford	John Vann
Hyde	William Selby
Iredell	John M. Young
Johnston	Josiah Houlder
Jones	James Harrison
Lenoir	William Dunn Moseley
Lincoln	John B. Harry
Macon	Benjamin S. Brittain
Martin	Jesse Cooper
Mecklenburg	Stephen Fox
Montgomery	Reuben Kendall
Moore	Cornelius Dowd
Nash	Samuel L. Arrington
New Hanover	Louis H. Marsteller
Northampton	William Moody
Onslow	David W. Simmons
Orange	Joseph Allison
Pasquotank	Frederick Whitehurst
Perquimans	Jesse Wilson
Person	Isham Edwards
Pitt	Alfred Moye
Randolph	Alfred Staley
Richmond	Alexander Martin
Robeson	Malcolm Patterson
Rockingham	David S. Reid
Rowan	Thomas Gilchrist Polk
Rutherford	Alanson W. Moore
Sampson	Edward C. Gavin
Stokes	Matthew R. Moore
Surry	Harrison M. Waugh
Tyrrell	George H. Alexander
Wake	Samuel Whitaker
Warren	Weldon Nathaniel Edwards
Washington	John B. Beasley
Wayne	John Exum
Wilkes	James Wellborn/Welborn
Yancey	Thomas Baker

== Acts passed by the assembly ==
The following acts were passed by this General Assembly:

- Implementation of the new election procedures enacted in the constitution convention, including duties of the sheriffs
- Suppression of the vice of gambling in the state
- Disposition of un-surveyed Cherokee lands in Haywood and Macon Counties
- Various acts dealing with Banks, the poor, hawking and peddling, county registers, and veteran seamen
- Completion of the construction of the state capital
- Chartering of railroad companies in the state
- Regulation of slavery
- Regulation of the state militia
- Incorporation of schools

== See also ==
- List of North Carolina state legislatures
