= Spruill =

Spruill is a surname. Notable people with the surname Spruill include:

- Benjamin Spruill (fl. 1779), American politician
- Godfrey Spruill (c. 1650–c. 1719), Scottish-American doctor
- Hezekiah Spruill (1732–1804), American revolutionary
- Hezekiah G. Spruill (1808–1874), Confederate general
- Wild Jimmy Spruill (1934–1996), American session guitarist
- Joseph Spruill (b. c. 1690), American politician
- Lionell Spruill (b. 1946), American politician
- Marquis Spruill (b. 1991), American football player
- Samuel Spruill (d. 1760), American politician
- Shannon Spruill (b. 1975), American professional wrestler known as Daffney
- Zeke Spruill (b. 1989), American baseball player
