= John De Rossett Toomer =

John De Rossett Toomer (March 13, 1784 – September 27, 1856) was an American attorney, legislator, and judge from North Carolina. He served on the North Carolina Superior Court on two separate occasions, briefly held an interim seat as an associate justice of the Supreme Court of North Carolina in 1829, and represented Cumberland County in the North Carolina General Assembly and at the state constitutional convention of 1835.

== Early life and education ==
Toomer was born in Wilmington, North Carolina.

After being raised in Wilmington, Toomer attended the University of North Carolina before reading law and beginning practice in his hometown.

== Career ==
Toomer began practicing law in Wilmington in the early nineteenth century and in 1815 served as county attorney for New Hanover County. By 1824 he had relocated to Fayetteville, the seat of Cumberland County.

The North Carolina General Assembly elected Toomer to the superior court on December 18, 1818, to fill a vacancy that had arisen when several superior court judges were elevated to the state supreme court; he resigned the following year. On March 4, 1825, when the Marquis de Lafayette visited Fayetteville during his farewell tour of the United States, Toomer delivered the address of welcome on behalf of the town council at a stage in front of the City Hotel.

In 1827, Toomer was elected to fill the seat vacated by Robert Strange, who had resigned. Two years later, on May 8, 1829, Governor John Owen and the Council of State appointed him an associate justice of the Supreme Court of North Carolina following the death in office of Chief Justice John Louis Taylor. The General Assembly declined to confirm the appointment when it met later that year, instead electing Thomas Ruffin to the court, and Toomer resigned on December 1, 1829, after less than eight months of service.

Toomer subsequently represented Cumberland County in the North Carolina Senate during the 1831–32 and 1832–33 sessions of the General Assembly. In June 1835 he sat as one of two Cumberland County delegates to the North Carolina Constitutional Convention of 1835, which met in Raleigh from June 4 to July 11 and produced the first major revisions to the state constitution adopted in 1776, including provisions for the popular election of the governor and changes to legislative apportionment. The General Assembly returned him to the superior court bench on January 7, 1837; he served until 1840, when he resigned because of ill health.
