= North Carolina Constitutional Convention of 1835 =

Constitution of North Carolina Convention of 1835
←	Fifth North Carolina Provincial Congress	Convention of 1861–1862	→
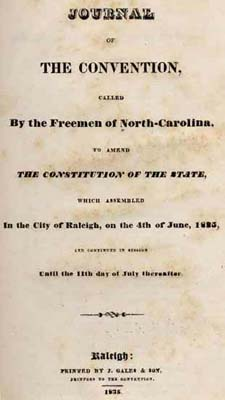
- Journal of the Convention

Overview
- Legislative body: State Convention
- Jurisdiction: North Carolina, United States
- Meeting place: Raleigh, North Carolina
- Term: 1835
- Members: 130 Delegates (65 counties)
- President: Nathaniel Macon
- Chairman pro tempore: David Lowry Swain
- Secretary: Edmund B. Freeman
- Assistant Secretary: Joseph D. Ward

Sessions
- 1st: June 4, 1835 – July 11, 1835

The North Carolina Constitutional Convention of 1835 was a meeting of delegates elected by eligible voters in counties in the United States state of North Carolina to amend the Constitution of North Carolina written in 1776 by the Fifth North Carolina Provincial Congress. They met in Raleigh, North Carolina from June 4, 1835, to July 11, 1835, and approved several amendments to the constitution that were voted on and approved by the voters of North Carolina on November 9, 1835. These amendments improved the representation of the more populous counties in the Piedmont and western regions of the state and, for the first time, provided for the election of the governor by popular vote rather than election by the members of the General Assembly.

== Demand for a new constitution ==
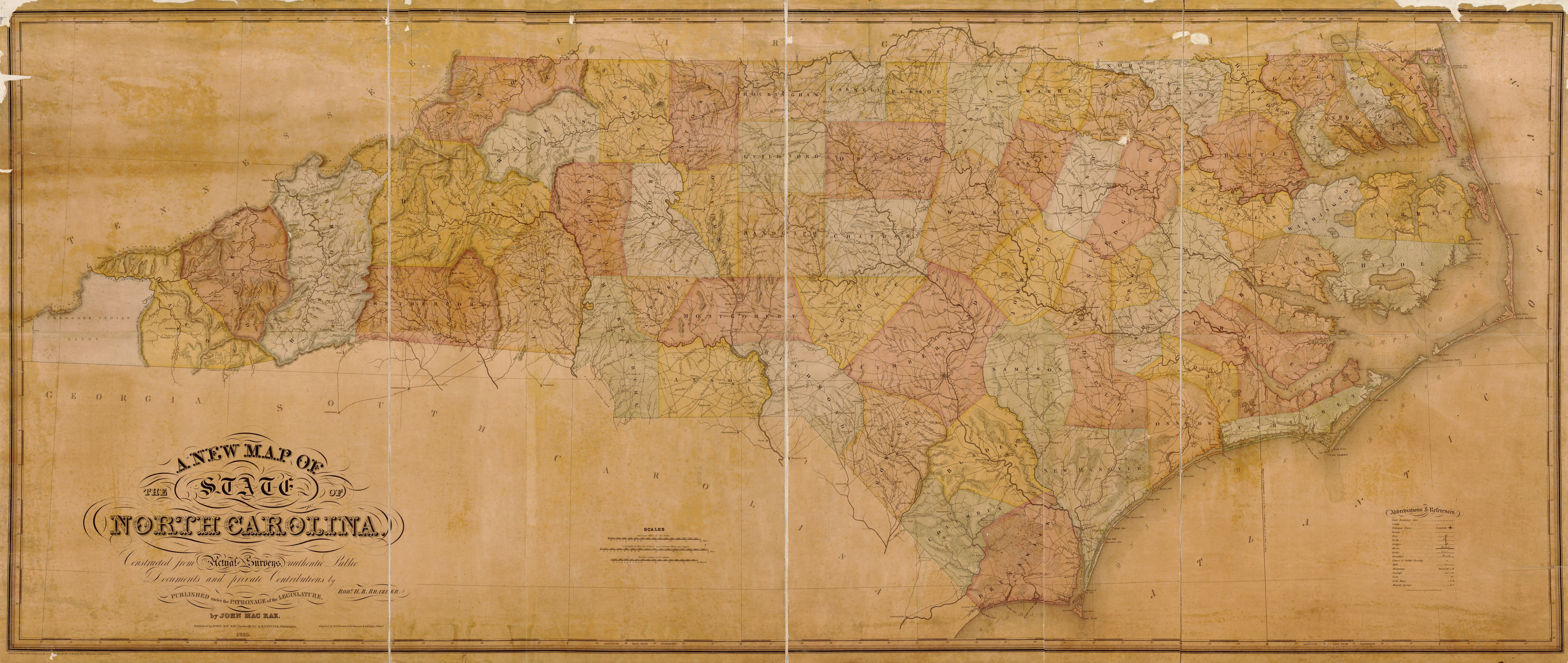
Map of North Carolina published in 1833

The population distribution had changed since the time of the original constitution was written in 1776. The number of counties had increased from 38 at the time of the first general assembly in 1777 to 68 in 1835. Many new counties had been created in the central Piedmont (Note: The Piedmont region as is commonly referred today was probably included in what is now called the Western region and just referred to as the Western region.) and Western regions of the state. The population of the 23 counties in the Piedmont region (344,184) and eight counties in the Western region (80,592) combined exceeded that of the 34 counties in the Eastern region (313,211) in 1830. This created a greater demand for roads, schools, and infrastructure in the faster growing counties, especially the Piedmont region. The 1776 constitution had spelled out one senator for each county, at least two delegates to the house of commons for each county, and one senator from each of eight large towns, also called districts or boroughs. The governor was also chosen by the general assembly vice the voters in each county.

The 1776 Constitution was worded with restrictions on who could and who could not vote, as follows:

- "That all freemen of the age of twenty-one Years, who have been inhabitants of any one county within this State twelve months immediately preceding the day of any election, and shall have paid public taxes shall be entitled to vote for members of the House of Commons for the county in which he resides."
- "That no clergyman, or preacher of the gospels of any denomination shall be capable of being a member of either the Senate, House of Commons, or Council of State, while he continues in the exercise of the pastoral function."
- "That no person, who shall deny the being of God or the truth of the Protestant religion, or the divine authority either of the Old or New Testaments, or who shall hold religious principles incompatible with the freedom and safety of the State, shall be capable of holding any office or place of trust or profit in the civil department within this State."

Freemen included former slaves, so they were allowed to vote in North Carolina from 1777 to 1835.

== Amendments to the constitution ==
Out of the convention came many amendments. Among those changes was fixing the membership of the Senate and House at their present levels, 50 senators and 120 representatives. Each county received at least one representative in the House and the remainder of the 120 representatives were assigned based on population of the counties. Senators were elected from districts that were laid out based on the amount of taxes paid to the state for each county. Also, the office of Governor became popularly elected. These changes gave the more populous western counties more of a say in government but still favored those who owned property, since this was required to vote and hold office. The vote was taken away from freed slaves in this convention, which followed a national trend. The most ardent supporters of disenfranchisement were located in the Eastern regions, where the black population was higher and slavery had been more established. The convention approved the changes on July 11, 1835. The convention's proposed changes were adopted by vote of the people on November 9, 1835 with 26,771 in favor and 21,606 against. These changes remained in effect until 1868 when the Constitution was next changed.

The convention also provided amendments that eliminated private acts that granted divorces, changed names, and legitimizing persons; provided procedures to impeach of state officers; procedures to remove judges for disability; established biannual legislative sessions; and provides provisions for amending the constitution.

== Officers ==
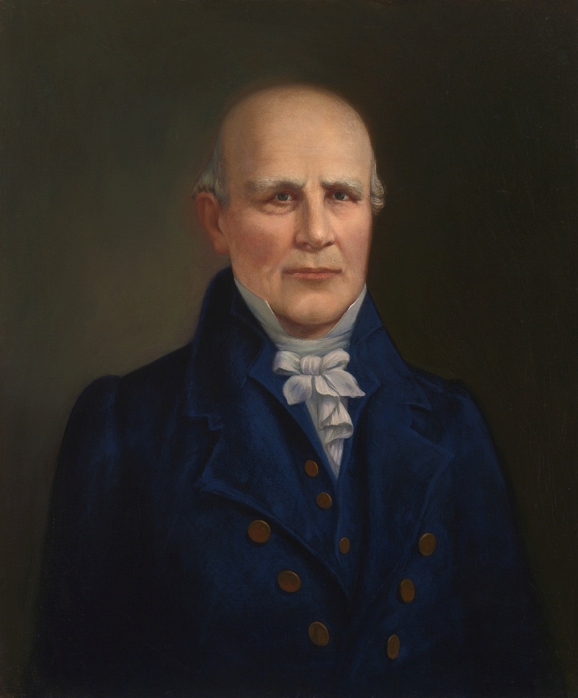
President Nathaniel Macon

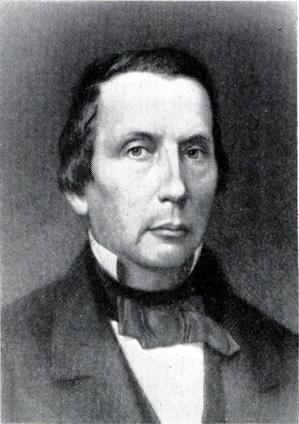
Chairman pro tempore David Lowry Swain

The following officers were chosen by the delegates to the convention:

- President Nathaniel Macon
- Chairman pro tempore: David Lowry Swain
- Secretary: Edmund B. Freeman
- Assistant Secretary: Joseph D. Ward
- Doorkeepers: Green Hill and John Cooper
- Printers: Gales & Son

== Delegates ==
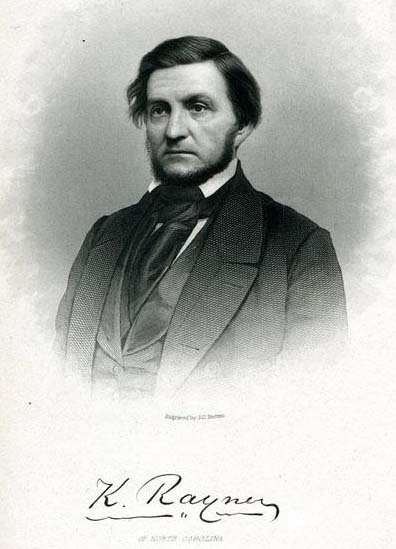
Kenneth Rayner

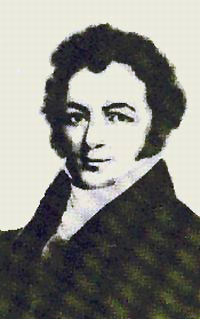
Samuel Price Carson

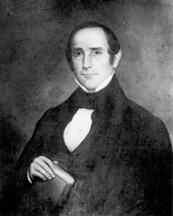
Asa Biggs

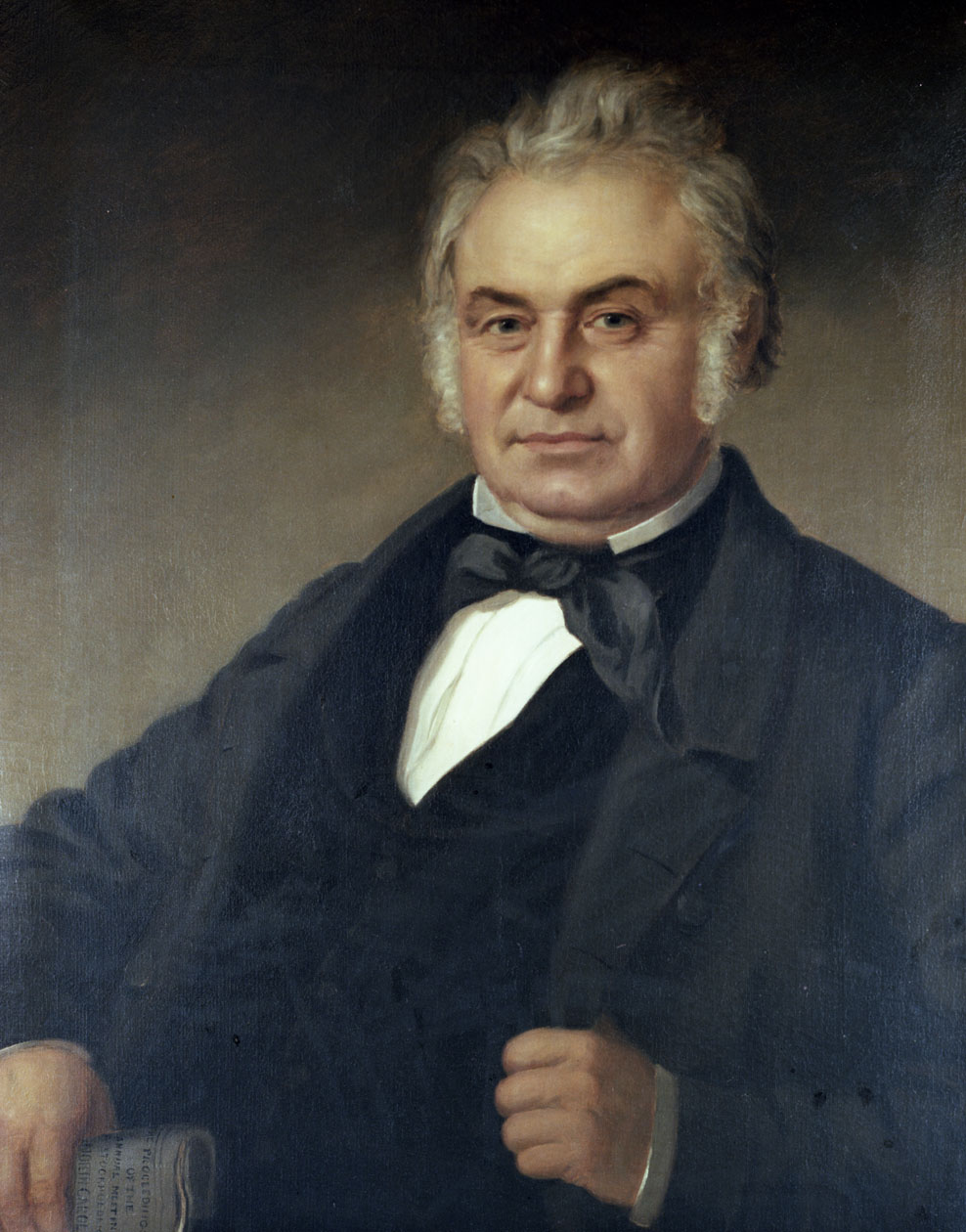
John Motley Morehead

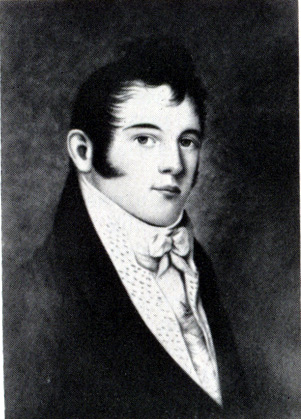
Richard Dobbs Spaight, Jr.

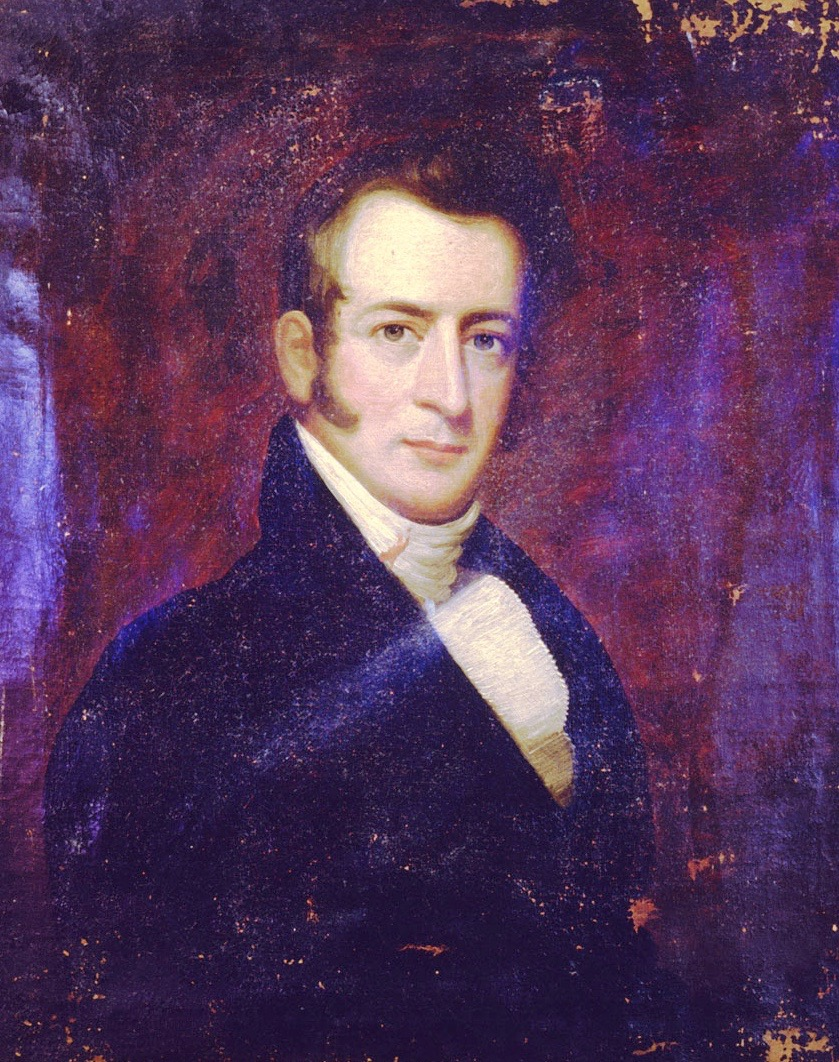
John Owen

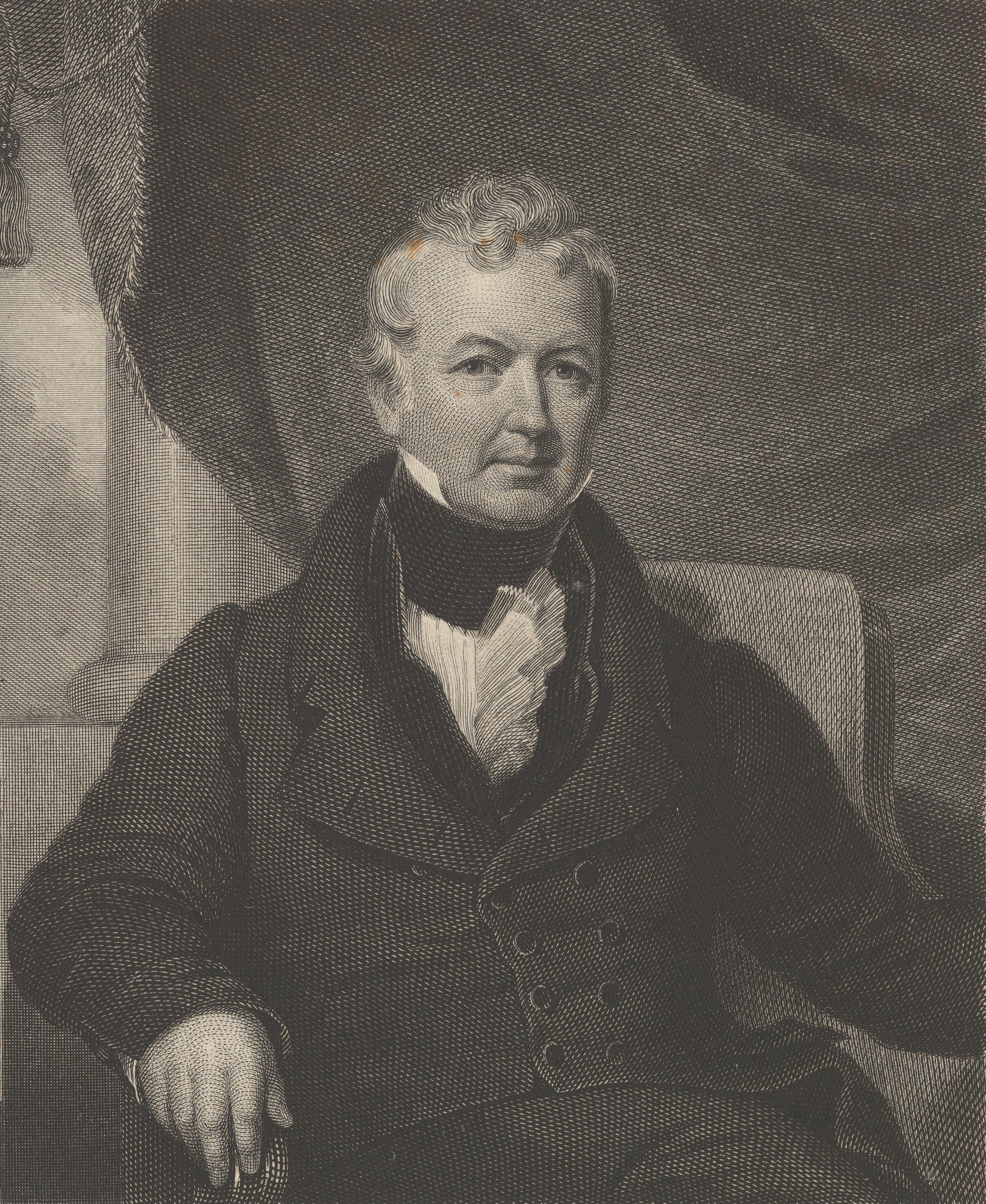
William Gaston

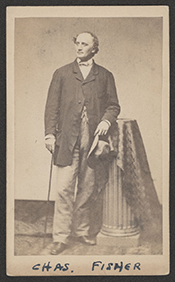
Charles Fisher, Rowan County

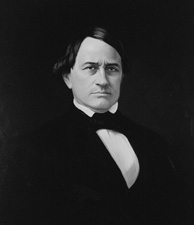
Jesse Speight

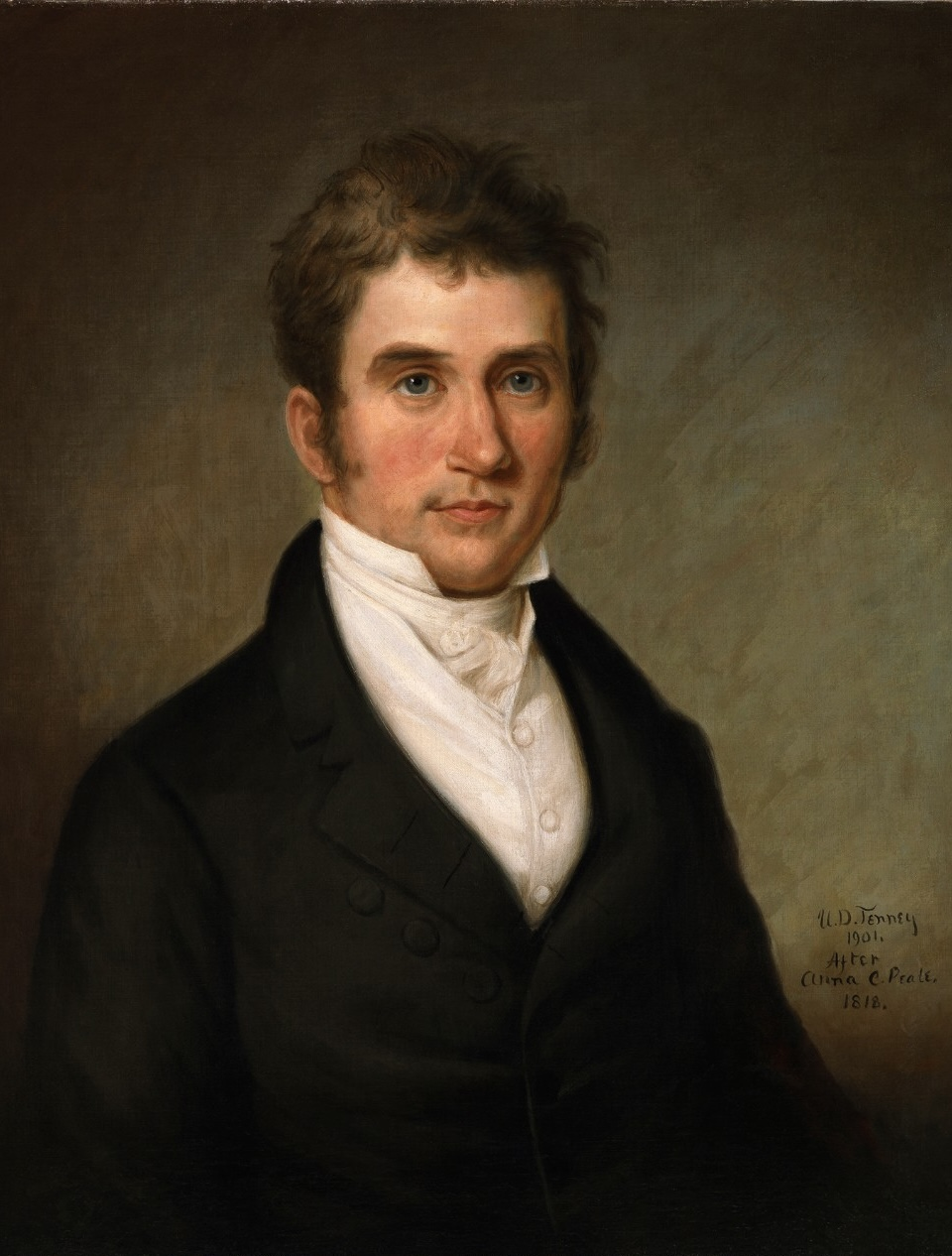
John Branch

In 1835, the counties of North Carolina were characterized as either eastern or western counties. The more sparsely populated counties were in the west. The voters from the counties elected two delegates for each county in elections held in April 1835. In 1835, there were 38 Eastern counties and 27 Western counties (Western and Piedmont Regions, see table). The following delegates were elected by the eligible voters of North Carolina:

County	Member 1	Member 2	Region	1830 County Population
Anson	William A. Morris	Joseph White	Piedmont	14,095
Ashe	Alexander B. McMillan	George Bower	Western	6,987
Beaufort	Joshua Tayloe	Richard H. Bonner	Eastern	10,969
Bertie	David Outlaw (Note: David Outlaw was a U.S. Congressman from North Carolina (1847–1853).)	Joseph B. G. Roulhac	Eastern	12,262
Bladen	John Owen (Note: John Owen, Democratic party, was the Governor on North Carolina (1828–1830))	Samuel B. Andres	Eastern	7,811
Brunswick	Frederick J. Hill	William R. Hall	Eastern	6,516
Buncombe	David Lowry Swain (Note: David Lowry Swain, National Republican party, was the Governor of North Carolina (1832–1835).)	James Gudger, Sr.	Western	16,281
Burke	Burges S. Gaither	Samuel Price Carson (Note: Samuel Price Carson was a U.S. Congressman from North Carolina (1825–1833).)	Western	17,888
Cabarrus	Daniel Moreau Barringer (Note: Daniel Moreau Barringer was a U.S. Congressman from North Carolina (1843–1849).)	Christopher Melchor	Piedmont	8,810
Camden	Willie McPherson	George Ferebee	Eastern	6,733
Carteret	Wallace H. Styron	James W. Bryan	Eastern	6,597
Caswell	William A. Lea	Calvin Graves	Piedmont	15,185
Chatham	Joseph Ramsay	Hugh McQueen	Piedmont	15,405
Chowan	Joseph B. Skinner	Samuel Tredwell Sawyer (Note: Samuel Tredwell Sawyer was U.S. Congressman from North Carolina (1837–1839).)	Eastern	6,697
Columbus	Alexander Troy	Absalom Powell	Eastern	4,141
Craven	William J. Gaston (Note: William J. Gaston was U.S. Congressman from North Carolina (1813–1817).)	Richard Dobbs Spaight, Jr. (Note: Richard Dobbs Spaight, Democratic party, was the Governor of North Carolina (1835–1836))	Eastern	13,734
Cumberland	John D. Toomer	Archibald McDiarmid	Eastern	14,834
Currituck	Gideon C. Marchant	Isaac Baxter	Eastern	7,655
Davidson	John A. Hogan	John L. Hargrave	Piedmont	13,389
Duplin	Jeremiah Pearsall	John E. Hussey	Eastern	11,291
Edgecombe	Louis Dicken Wilson (Note: Louis Dicken Wilson was a Brigadier-General of the 5th North Carolina Brigade and participated in the Mexican-American war.)	Phesanton S. Sugg	Eastern	14,935
Franklin	Henry J. G. Ruffin	William P. Williams	Piedmont	10,665
Gates	Riddick Gatling	Whitmel Stallings	Eastern	7,866
Granville	Robert B. Gilliam (Note: Robert B. Gilliam was elected to be a U.S. Congressman from North Carolina in 1870 but died before he could take his office.)	Josiah Crudup (Note: Josiah Crudup was a U.S. Congressman from North Carolina (1821–1823).)	Piedmont	19,355
Greene	Jesse Speight	Thomas Hooker	Eastern	6,413
Guilford	John Motley Morehead (Note: John Motley Morehead was the Governor of North Carolina (1841–1845).)	Jonathan Parker	Piedmont	18,737
Halifax	John Branch (Note: John Branch, Democratic party, was the Governor of North Carolina (1817–1820).)	Joseph J. Daniel	Eastern	17,739
Haywood	William Welch	Joseph Cathey	Western	4,578
Hertford	Isaac Pipkin	Kenneth Rayner (Note: Kenneth Rayner was a U.S. Congressman from North Carolina (1839–1845).)	Eastern	8,537
Hyde	Wilson B. Hodges	Alexander F. Gaston	Eastern	6,184
Iredell	Samuel King	John M. Young	Piedmont	14,918
Johnston	Jesse Adams	Hillory Wilder	Eastern	10,938
Jones	William Huggins	James W. Howard	Eastern	5,608
Lenoir	James Cox	Council Wooten	Eastern	7,723
Lincoln	Bartlett Shipp	Henry Cansler	Piedmont	22,455
Macon	Benjamin S. Brittain	James W. Guinn	Western	5,333
Martin	Jesse Cooper	Asa Biggs (Note: Asa Biggs was a U.S. Congressman (1845–1847) and a U.S. Senator (1855–1858) from North Carolina.)	Eastern	8,539
Mecklenburg	James M. Hutcheson	Isaac Grier	Piedmont	20,073
Montgomery	John B. Martin	James L. Gaines	Piedmont	10,919
Moore	John B. Kelly	Charles Chalmers	Piedmont	7,745
Nash	John Arrington	William W. Boddie	Eastern	8,490
New-Hanover	Lewis H. Marsteller	Owen Holmes	Eastern	10,959
Northampton	Roderick B. Gary	Samuel Calvert	Eastern	13,391
Onslow	David W. Saunders	John A. Averitt	Eastern	7,814
Orange	James Strudwick Smith (Note: James Strudwick Smith was a U.S. Congressman from North Carolina (1817–1821).)	William Montgomery (Note: William Montgomery was a U.S. Congressman from North Carolina (1835–1841).)	Piedmont	23,908
Pasquotank	Richard H. Ramsay	John L. Bailey	Eastern	8,641
Perquimans	Jonathan H. Jacocks	Jesse Wilson	Eastern	7,419
Person	Moses Chambers	John W. Williams	Piedmont	10,027
Pitt	Robert Williams, Sr.	John Joiner	Eastern	12,093
Randolph	Alexander Gray	Benjamin Elliott	Piedmont	12,406
Richmond	Alfred Dockery (Note: Alfred Dockery was a U.S. Congressman from North Carolina (1845–1847, 1851–1853).)	Henry W. Harrington	Piedmont	9,396
Robeson	John W. Powell	Richard C. Bunting	Eastern	9,433
Rockingham	Edward T. Brodnax	John L. Lesueur	Piedmont	12,935
Rowan	Charles Fisher (Note: Charles Fisher was a U.S. Congressman from North Carolina (1819–1821, 1839–1841).)	John Giles	Piedmont	20,786
Rutherford	Joseph Carson, MD	Theodorick F. Birchett	Western	17,557
Sampson	William B. Meares	Thomas I. Faison	Eastern	11,634
Stokes	Matthew R. Moore	Emanuel Shober	Piedmont	16,196
Surry	Meshack Franklin (Note: Franklin Meshack was a U.S. Congressman from North Carolina (1807–1815).)	William P. Dobson	Piedmont	14,504
Tyrrell	Hezekiah G. Spruill	Joseph Halsey	Eastern	4,732
Wake	Henry Seawell	Kimbrough Jones	Piedmont	20,398
Warren	Nathaniel Macon (Note: Nathaniel Macon was a member of the United States House of Representatives from 1791 to 1815 and a member of the United States Senate from 1815 to 1828.)	Weldon Nathaniel Edwards (Note: Weldon Nathaniel Edwards was a U.S. Congressman from North Carolina (1813–1827).)	Piedmont	11,877
Washington	Joseph C. Norcom	Josiah Collins, Jr.	Eastern	4,552
Wayne	Gabriel Sherard	Lemuel H. Whitfield	Eastern	10,331
Wilkes	Edmund Jones	James Wellborn	Western	11,968
Yancey	Abner Jervis	Bacchus J. Smith	Western	5,962 (1840) (Note: Yancey County was created in 1833 from sections of Burke and Buncombe Counties, so it was not included in the 1830 Census. Census figures for the 1840 Census are shown instead, even though the population in 1830 was part of these other two counties.)

== See also ==
- List of counties in North Carolina
- North Carolina General Assembly of 1835
- North Carolina General Assembly of 1836-1837
