= Governor Holmes =

Governor Holmes may refer to:

- David Holmes (politician) (1769–1832), 1st and 5th Governor of Mississippi
- Gabriel Holmes (1769–1829), 21st Governor of North Carolina
- Robert D. Holmes (1909–1976), 28th Governor of Oregon
