= Dougherty v. Stepp =

- Court: North Carolina Supreme Court
- Decided: 1835
- Citation: 18 N.C. 371, 1 Devereux & Battle 371

Court membership
- Chief judge: Thomas Ruffin
- Associate judges: William Gaston, Joseph J. Daniel

Case opinions
- Every unauthorized, and therefore unlawful entry, into the close of another, is a trespass. From every illegal entry onto another's land, the law infers some damages, even if only the nominal damages of treading down the grass, herbage, or shrubbery.
- Majority: Ruffin, joined by unanimous

Dougherty v. Stepp, 18 N.C. 371 (N.C. 1835) is a decision of the North Carolina Supreme Court authored by Chief Justice Thomas Ruffin. For at least a century, this case has been used in first-year Torts classes in American law schools to teach students about the tort of trespass upon real property.

== Background ==
Stepp incorrectly believed that certain unenclosed land belonging to Doughterty belonged to him. Stepp therefore entered the unenclosed land with a surveyor and chain carriers, who began surveying the land. Before they had marked any trees or cut any bushes, Dougherty challenged their actions.

Dougherty then brought suit against Stepp for trespass quare clausum fregit. A trial was held in Buncombe before Judge Martin. Judge Martin held that since Stepp, the defendant, had not damaged Dougherty's land in any way, Stepp had not committed a trespass. He therefore directed the jury to find for the defendant.

Dougherty then appealed this ruling to the North Carolina Supreme Court. Dougherty's lawyer argued that every unwarrantable entering on another's real property constituted a trespass, even if the defendant mistakenly believed that the land belonged to him. He also argued that every trespass involves some damage to the property, even if it is only the treading down and bruising of the herbage and shrubbery. Stepp's lawyer did not appear before the North Carolina Supreme Court.

== Opinion of the Court ==
In a per curiam decision authored by Chief Justice Ruffin, the Court granted the plaintiff's appeal. The court found that it was error for the trial court to hold that Stepp's actions did not constitute a trespass. The court held that "every unauthorised, and therefore unlawful entry, into the close of another, is a trespass." From every illegal entry onto another's land, the law infers some damages, even if only the nominal damages of treading down the grass, herbage, or shrubbery.

The court therefore granted the appeal and remanded the case for a new trial.
