= 1821 North Carolina gubernatorial election =

- December 6, 1821

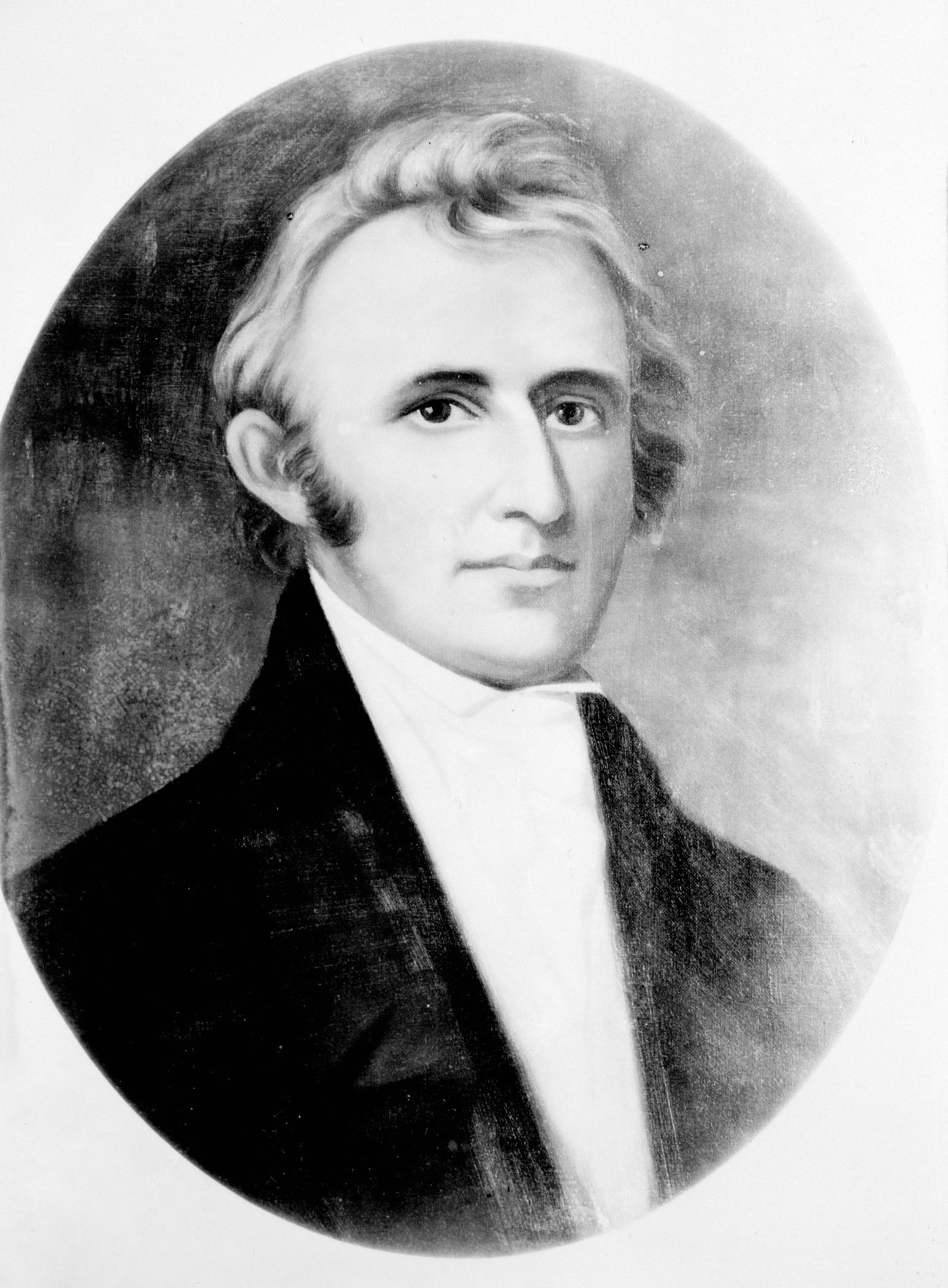
Nominee	Gabriel Holmes	James Mebane	Hutchins Gordon Burton
Party	Democratic-Republican	Democratic-Republican	Federalist
Popular vote	106	65	13
Percentage	57.60%	35.33%	7.07%
Governor before election
Jesse Franklin
Democratic-Republican
Elected Governor
Gabriel Holmes
Democratic-Republican

The 1821 North Carolina gubernatorial election was held on December 6, 1821, in order to elect the Governor of North Carolina. Democratic-Republican candidate and former member of the North Carolina Senate Gabriel Holmes was elected by the North Carolina General Assembly against Democratic-Republican candidate James Mebane and Federalist candidate and incumbent member of the U.S. House of Representatives from North Carolina's 2nd district Hutchins Gordon Burton.

== General election ==
On election day, December 6, 1821, Democratic-Republican candidate Gabriel Holmes was elected by the North Carolina General Assembly by a margin of 41 votes against his foremost opponent fellow Democratic-Republican candidate James Mebane, thereby retaining Democratic-Republican control over the office of Governor. Holmes was sworn in as the 21st Governor of North Carolina on December 7, 1821.

=== Results ===
North Carolina gubernatorial election, 1821
Party	Candidate	Votes	%
Democratic-Republican	Gabriel Holmes	106	57.60
Democratic-Republican	James Mebane	65	35.33
Federalist	Hutchins Gordon Burton	13	7.07
Total votes		184	100.00
Democratic-Republican hold			
