= Statue of Thomas Ruffin =

- Interactive map of Statue of Thomas Ruffin
- Location: Raleigh, North Carolina
- Coordinates: 35°46′46″N 78°38′23″W
- Dedicated date: February 1, 1915
- Dedicated to: Thomas Ruffin
- Dismantled date: July 2020

A statue of Thomas Ruffin was installed in Raleigh, North Carolina, United States. The memorial was removed in July 2020.

== See also ==
- List of monuments and memorials removed during the George Floyd protests
