= James Iver McKay =

American politician (1792–1853)

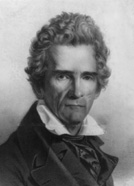

Dean of the United States House of Representatives
- In office February 23, 1848 – March 4, 1849
- Preceded by: John Quincy Adams
- Succeeded by: Linn Boyd

Member of the U.S. House of Representatives from North Carolina
- In office March 4, 1831 – March 3, 1849
- Preceded by: Edward Bishop Dudley
- Succeeded by: William Shepperd Ashe
- Constituency: 5th district (1831–1843); 6th district (1843–1847); 7th district (1847–1849)

Personal details
- Born: July 17, 1792 Elizabethtown, North Carolina, U.S.
- Died: September 14, 1853 (aged 61) Goldsboro, North Carolina, U.S.
- Party: Democratic

James Iver McKay (July 17, 1792 – September 14, 1853) was an American lawyer and politician who served nine terms as a member of the United States House of Representatives from North Carolina from 1831 to 1849.

== Early life and education ==
He was born in 1792, near Elizabethtown, North Carolina. He pursued classical studies and then law.

== Career ==
He was appointed United States attorney for the district of North Carolina on March 6, 1817, and also served in the North Carolina General Assembly (1815–1819, 1822, 1826, and 1830).

=== Congress ===
He was elected as a Jacksonian to the 22nd through 24th congresses (1831–1837) and as a Democrat to the 25th through 30th congresses (1837–1849). He served as chairman of the: Committee on Military Affairs (25th Congress), Committee on the Post Office and Post Roads (26th Congress), Committee on Expenditures in the Department of War (27th Congress), Ways and Means Committee (28th and 29th congresses).

He was also the chief sponsor of the Walker Tariff of 1846; and was the favorite son of the North Carolina delegation at the 1848 Democratic National Convention for vice president. McKay also introduced the Coinage Act of 1849 on the House floor, with it successfully passing.

== Death and burial ==
McKay died in Goldsboro, North Carolina, September 14, 1853. Though an unapologetic slave-owner, his will included the unusual provision that 30–40 of his slaves be placed under the supervision of the American Colonization Society.

== See also ==
- Dean of the House of Representatives
- List of members of the United States Congress who owned slaves

U.S. House of Representatives
Preceded by Edward B. Dudley	Member of the U.S. House of Representatives from North Carolina's 5th congressional district 1831 – 1843	Succeeded by Romulus M. Saunders
Preceded by Archibald H. Arrington	Member of the U.S. House of Representatives from North Carolina's 6th congressional district 1843 – 1847	Succeeded by John Daniel
Preceded by John Daniel	Member of the U.S. House of Representatives from North Carolina's 7th congressional district 1847 – 1849	Succeeded by William S. Ashe
