= Warren Winslow =

American politician

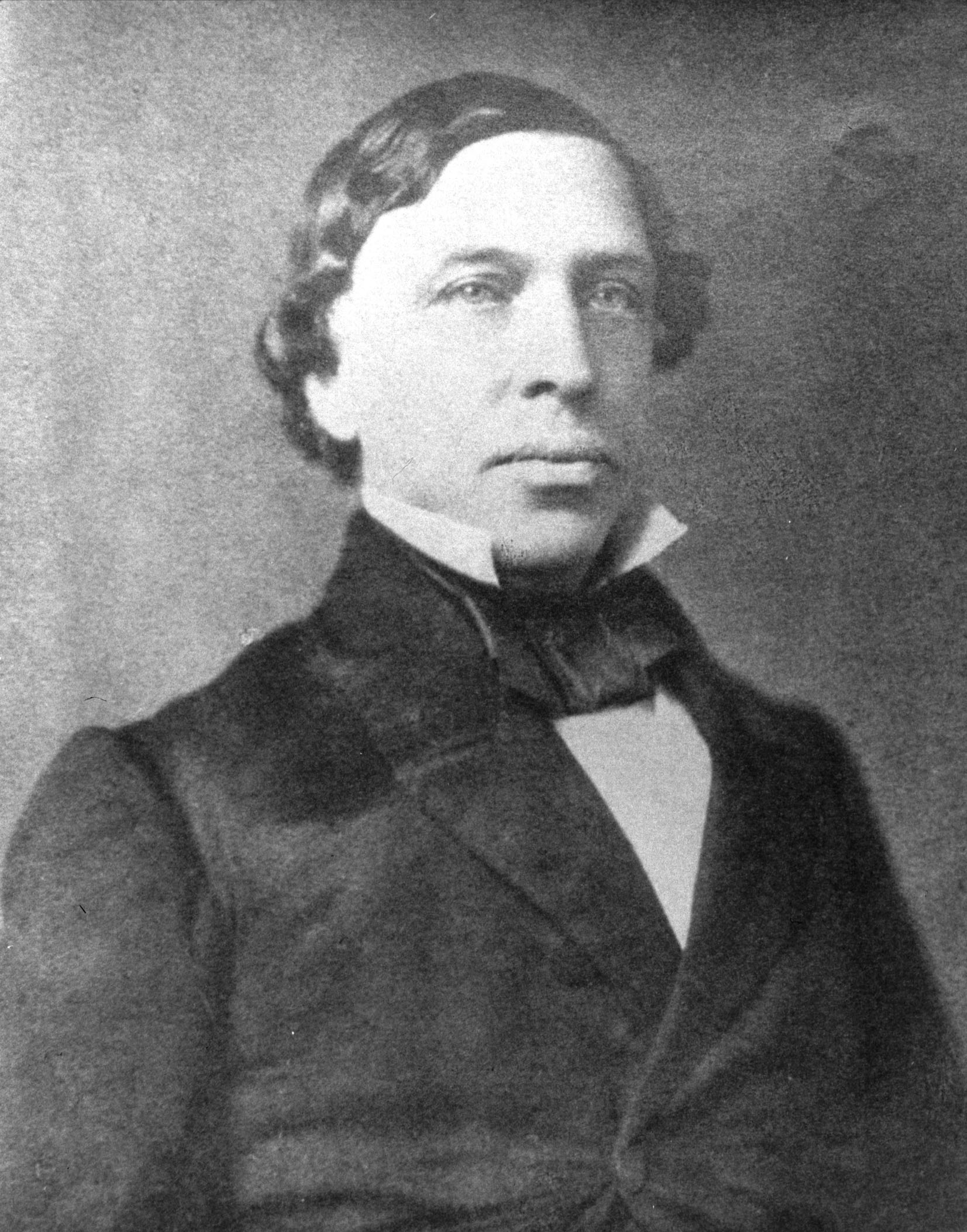

Member of the U.S. House of Representatives from North Carolina's 3rd district
- In office March 4, 1855 – March 3, 1861
- Preceded by: William S. Ashe
- Succeeded by: Oliver H. Dockery

33rd Governor of North Carolina
- In office December 6, 1854 – January 1, 1855
- Preceded by: David Settle Reid
- Succeeded by: Thomas Bragg

Member of the North Carolina Senate
- In office 1854

Personal details
- Born: January 1, 1810 Fayetteville, North Carolina, US
- Died: August 16, 1862 (aged 52) Fayetteville, North Carolina, US
- Party: Democratic
- Education: University of North Carolina at Chapel Hill

Warren Winslow (January 1, 1810 – August 16, 1862) was an American politician, who served as 33rd governor of the U.S. state of North Carolina from 1854 to 1855. Although first elected to the state senate in 1854, Winslow had a spectacular rise to Democratic Party leadership and became Speaker of the senate that year.

Winslow was serving as Speaker of the North Carolina Senate in 1854 when Governor David S. Reid resigned, having been elected to the Senate by the legislature. According to the amendments passed at the Convention of 1835, if a governor died or left office, the Speaker of the Senate was to assume the post (the lieutenant governor position was not created until the ratification of the Constitution of 1868). Winslow graduated from the University of North Carolina. After being elected to a vacant U.S. Senate seat and with almost one month left in his gubernatorial term, Governor David S. Reid handed the gubernatorial position to Winslow on December 6, 1854. Winslow served in this position until Thomas Bragg was inaugurated on January 1, 1855. He then served in the United States House of Representatives from March 1855 to March 1861.

Winslow was a slave owner.

Winslow was a native of Fayetteville, North Carolina, which is also where he died.

Political offices
Preceded by David S. Reid	Governor of North Carolina; 1854–1855	Succeeded by Thomas Bragg
U.S. House of Representatives
Preceded by William S. Ashe	Member of the U.S. House of Representatives from North Carolina's 3rd congressional district 1855-1861	Succeeded by Oliver H. Dockery
