= F. Burton Craige =

American politician

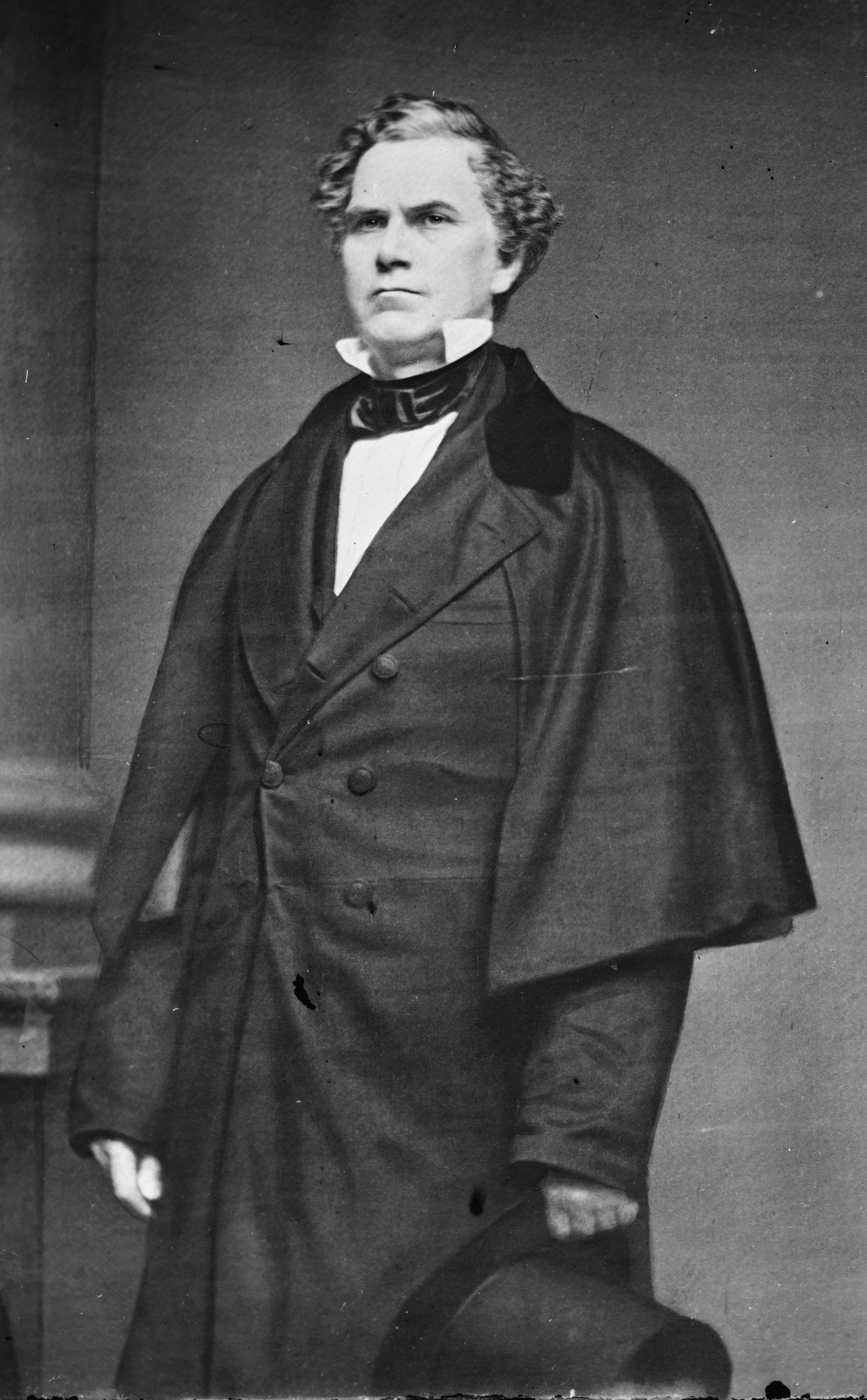

Member of the U.S. House of Representatives from North Carolina's 7th district
- In office March 4, 1853 – March 3, 1861
- Preceded by: William S. Ashe
- Succeeded by: Alexander H. Jones

Member of the North Carolina House of Representatives
- In office 1832–1834

Personal details
- Born: Francis Burton Craige; March 13, 1811 Salisbury, North Carolina, US
- Died: December 30, 1875 (aged 64) Concord, North Carolina, US
- Party: Democratic
- Profession: Politician, Lawyer

Francis Burton Craige (March 13, 1811 – December 30, 1875) was an editor, lawyer, and U.S. representative from the south fork of the Yadkin River five miles from Salisbury, North Carolina. He was the youngest son of David and Mary Foster Craige.

== Personal life ==
As a child, he attended a classical private school in Salisbury and in 1829, he graduated from University of North Carolina at Chapel Hill, where he studied law. He was admitted to the bar in 1832 at the age of just 21, commencing practice in Salisbury. In 1836 Craige married Elizabeth Phifer Erwin, granddaughter of Matthew Locke (North Carolina politician) and had 5 children; James Alexander was born in 1841, Kerr in 1843, Francis Burton, Jr., in 1846, Mary Elizabeth in 1848, and Annie Erwin in 1852.

Craige died in Concord, North Carolina on December 30, 1875, while attending the Cabarrus County Superior Court. He was buried in the Old English Cemetery in Salisbury, North Carolina.

== Career ==
While studying law, Craige was an editor and proprietor of the newspaper Salisbury Western Carolinian (1829-1831). Under his editorship, he made the newspaper one of chief advocates of Nullification in North Carolina, suggesting full co-operation with South Carolina in its ongoing dispute with Andrew Jackson.

=== State legislature ===
Craige was one of the last borough representatives in the State House of Representatives from 1832 to 1834. In 1835, Craige was defeated by Abraham Rencher while challenging him for his seat in Congress.

=== Congress ===
Later in his career, he was elected as a Democrat from the 33rd to the 36th U.S. Congresses (March 4, 1853 – March 3, 1861). He held additional posts including Chairman, Committee on Public Buildings and Grounds, (33rd Congress), and was a delegate to the Provisional Congress of the Confederate States meeting in Richmond, Virginia from July 1861 to February 1862.

=== Accolades and affiliations ===
In 1847, he was awarded a master's degree by University of North Carolina at Chapel Hill. He was also active in Episcopal Church (United States).

== Legacy ==
Burton Craige left his legacy in the form of a freshman residence hall at his alma mater.

== Footnotes ==
U.S. House of Representatives
Preceded by William S. Ashe	Member of the U.S. House of Representatives from North Carolina's 7th congressional district March 4, 1853 – March 3, 1861	Succeeded by Alexander H. Jones^{(1)}
Confederate States House of Representatives
Preceded by (none)	Representative to the Provisional Confederate Congress from North Carolina; 1861	Succeeded by (none)
Notes and references
1. Because of North Carolina's secession, the House seat was vacant for six years before Jones succeeded Craige.
