= North Carolina v. Mann =

1829 criminal case involving slave owners and slaves

North Carolina v. Mann, 13 N.C. 263 (N.C. 1829) (or State v. Mann, as it would have been identified within North Carolina), is a decision in which the Supreme Court of North Carolina ruled that slave owners had absolute authority over their slaves and could not be found guilty of committing violence against them.

== Background ==
Elizabeth Jones owned a slave named Lydia and she hired her out for work to John Mann of Chowan County. Mann shot and wounded Lydia when she tried to escape a lashing. Mann was found guilty of battery by a jury of twelve white men drawn from his town and the court (Superior Court Judge Joseph J. Daniel) assessed a five-dollar fine. The North Carolina Supreme Court overruled the conviction on the grounds that slaves were the absolute property of their owners who could not be punished at common law unless the legislature authorized such punishment.

== Decision ==
The judgment of the state supreme court was written by Judge Thomas Ruffin, who stated that "the power of the master must be absolute, to render the submission of the slave perfect", but said that slaves should have legal right of protection from persons other than their owners. Ruffin, however, made it clear that his opinion was a legal one, and that his sympathy lay with Lydia. He wrote that "the struggle, too, in the Judge's own breast between the feelings of the man, and the duty of the magistrate is a severe one, presenting strong temptation to put aside such questions, if it be possible. It is useless however, to argue of things inherent in our political state. And it is criminal in a court to avoid any responsibility which the laws impose". Harriet Beecher Stowe cited State v. Mann as a source for her depiction of slavery in her novel Dred.

== Comparisons ==
The decision has been contrasted with the British first instance decision in 1811, R v Arthur Hodge. In that case, on a charge of murdering one of his slaves, the defendant argued that an owner had absolute power over their slave to do as they will. The defense was rejected and Hodge was hanged for the murder.

The decision is also contrasted with a later North Carolina Supreme Court decision that granted slaves a limited right of self-defense against slave owners and overseers: State v. Negro Will in 1834. In that case, Judge William Gaston, writing for the court, found that a slave acting in self-defense who killed his overseer could not be found guilty of first-degree murder but at most of manslaughter.

== See also ==
- List of court cases in the United States involving slavery
- Freedom suit
