= Thomas Ruffin Jr. =

American judge (1824–1889)

Thomas Ruffin Jr. (September 21, 1824 – May 23, 1889) was a justice of the North Carolina Supreme Court from 1881 to 1883.

Born in Hillsborough, North Carolina, he was the fourth son of North Carolina Chief Justice Thomas Ruffin and Anne Kirkland Ruffin, and the grandson of state legislator Sterling Ruffin.
