= Elizabeth Henry Haywood Dudley =

First Lady of North Carolina (1836–1840)

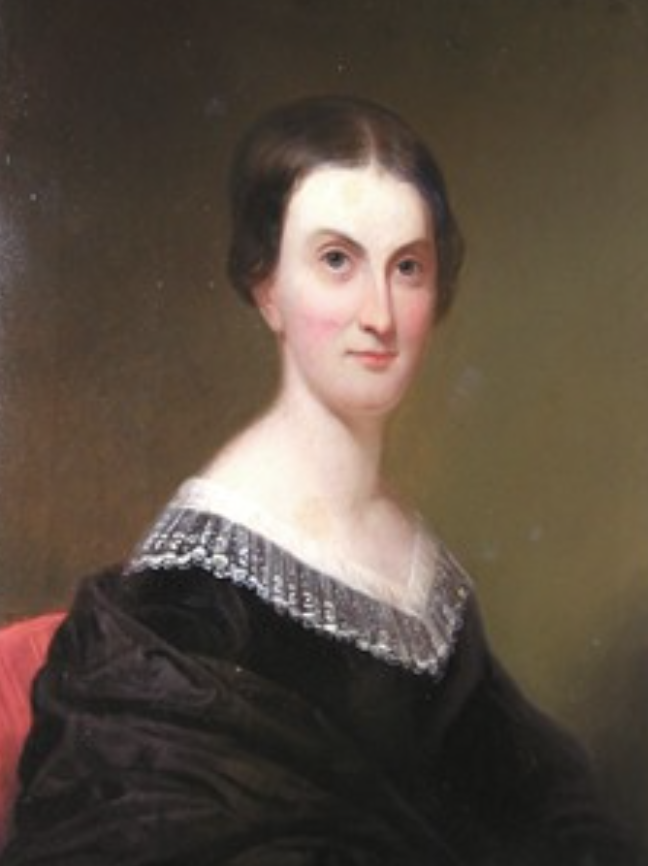

First Lady of North Carolina
- In office December 31, 1836 – October 23, 1840
- Governor: Edward Bishop Dudley
- Preceded by: vacant
- Succeeded by: Ann Eliza Lindsay Morehead

Personal details
- Born: Elizabeth Henry Haywood; November 24, 1796 Raleigh, North Carolina, U.S.
- Died: October 23, 1840 (aged 43)
- Party: Whig
- Spouse: Edward Bishop Dudley
- Children: 6
- Relatives: William Henry Haywood Jr. (brother); John Haywood (uncle); Charles Manly (brother-in-law)

Elizabeth "Eliza" Henry Haywood Dudley (Note: Some records show her name as Elizabeth Ruffin Haywood Dudley) (November 24, 1796 – October 23, 1840) was an American society hostess who served as First Lady of North Carolina from 1836 to 1840 as the wife of Governor Edward Bishop Dudley. She died during her husband's term.

== Biography ==
Dudley was born Elizabeth Henry Hawyood into a prominent family from Raleigh, North Carolina. She was the daughter of William Henry Haywood Sr. and Ann Sheppard. She was the sister of U.S. Senator William Henry Haywood Jr. and Charity Hare Haywood Manly, who also served as First Lady of North Carolina as the wife of Charles Manly. She was the niece of North Carolina State Treasurer John Haywood of Haywood Hall.

In November 1815, she married Edward Bishop Dudley. Together they had six children: Christopher, William Henry, Edward, Elizabeth Ann, Jane Frances, and Margaret. In 1836, her husband was elected to serve as Governor of North Carolina. Upon his inauguration on December 31, 1836, she became the First Lady of North Carolina. She served as the state's first lady until her death on October 23, 1840.
