= Samuel Spruill =

American politician

Samuel Spruill served in the Provincial Assembly of North Carolina from 1754 until his death in 1760. He was the son of Dr. Godfrey Spruill, the patriarch of the Spruill family in the United States and the first doctor in North Carolina.

== Sources ==
- Pea Ridge (Washington County), NC History
