= William S. Ashe =

American politician (1813–1862)

William Shepperd Ashe
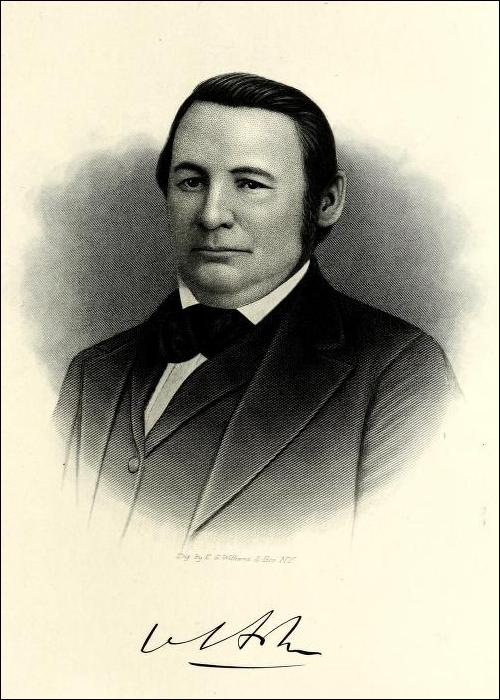

Member of the U.S. House of Representatives from North Carolina
- In office March 4, 1849 – March 3, 1855
- Preceded by: James I. McKay (7th); Alfred Dockery (3rd)
- Succeeded by: F. Burton Craige (7th); Warren Winslow (3rd)
- Constituency: 7th district (1849-53); 3rd district (1853-55)

Personal details
- Born: August 12, 1813 Rocky Point, North Carolina, U.S.
- Died: September 14, 1862 (aged 49) Wilmington, North Carolina, U.S.
- Party: Democratic
- Spouse: Sarah Ann Green
- Education: Trinity College
- Occupation: Lawyer

Military service
- Allegiance: Confederate States
- Years of service: 1861-1862
- Rank: Colonel
- Battles/wars: American Civil War

William Shepperd Ashe (August 12, 1813 – September 14, 1862) was an American lawyer and politician who served three terms as a Democratic U.S. representative from North Carolina between 1849 and 1855.

After his service in Congress, Ashe served as an officer in the Confederate army during the Civil War.

== Early life and education ==
Born in Rocky Point, North Carolina in 1813, Ashe attended school in Fayetteville and pursued classical studies at Trinity College in Hartford, Connecticut. Ashe engaged in rice cultivation and studied law; he was admitted to the state bar in 1836 and practiced in New Hanover County.

== Political career ==
Active in the Democratic Party, Ashe was a presidential elector in 1844 and was elected to the North Carolina Senate for a term of two years (1846–1848).

=== Congress ===
In 1848, he was sent to the U.S. House, serving in the 31st, 32nd, and 33rd Congresses (March 4, 1849 – March 3, 1855). During the 32nd Congress, Ashe chaired the Committee on Elections.

== Later career ==
He did not run again in 1854 but served as the president of the Wilmington and Weldon Railroad Company from 1854 until his death.

He was elected to one further term in the North Carolina Senate between 1859 and 1861. He was a delegate to the Charleston Democratic National Convention in 1860 and the North Carolina Constitutional Convention of 1861.

== Civil War ==
During the American Civil War, Ashe was a major in the Confederate Army, in charge of all transportation between Virginia and the rest of the South.

== Death and burial ==
Ashe was killed in a railroad accident near Wilmington, North Carolina on September 14, 1862. He is buried in a family cemetery in Pender County, North Carolina.

== Sources ==
- United States Congress. "William S. Ashe (id: A000310)". Biographical Directory of the United States Congress.

U.S. House of Representatives
Preceded by James I. McKay	Member of the U.S. House of Representatives from North Carolina's 7th congressional district 1849–1853	Succeeded by Francis Burton Craige
Preceded by Alfred Dockery	Member of the U.S. House of Representatives from North Carolina's 3rd congressional district 1853–1855	Succeeded by Warren Winslow
