= Thomas Ruffin =

American judge

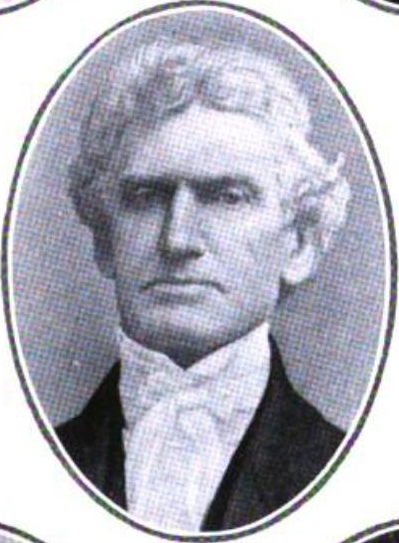
Thomas Ruffin

Thomas Ruffin (1787–1870) was an American jurist and justice of the North Carolina Supreme Court from 1829 to 1852 and again from 1858 to 1859. He was chief justice of that Court from 1833 to 1852.

== Biography ==
Thomas Ruffin was born on November 17, 1787, at the residence of his maternal grandfather Thomas Roane at Newington in King and Queen County, Virginia. Ruffin graduated from the College of New Jersey and studied law in North Carolina under Archibald Murphey. He began law practice in Hillsborough, North Carolina, where he farmed. He was elected to several terms in the North Carolina House of Commons and served as a Superior Court judge from 1816 to 1818 and 1825 to 1828. In 1828, the state called upon Ruffin to bring the State Bank of North Carolina out of debt as its new president, which he did in one year. The legislature then named him to the state supreme court.

=== Supreme Court service ===
"The election of former Superior Court Judge and State Bank President Ruffin to the bench in 1829 effectively ensured the North Carolina Supreme Court's survival," according to Martin Brinkley. Ranked by Harvard Law School Dean Roscoe Pound as one of the ten greatest jurists in American history, Ruffin singlehandedly transformed the common law of North Carolina into an instrument of economic change. His writings on the subject of eminent domain—the right of the state to seize private property for the public good—paved the way for the expansion of railroads into North Carolina, enabling the "Rip Van Winkle State" to embrace the industrial revolution. Ruffin's opinions were cited as persuasive authority by appellate tribunals throughout the United States. His decisions' influence on the developing jurisprudence of the states then known as the Southwest (Alabama, Louisiana, Tennessee, Arkansas, and Mississippi), settled by emigrating North Carolinians in large numbers, made Ruffin a celebrated figure at home. Public veneration of the "stern prophet," as Ruffin was called, preserved his court from destruction by populist politicians.

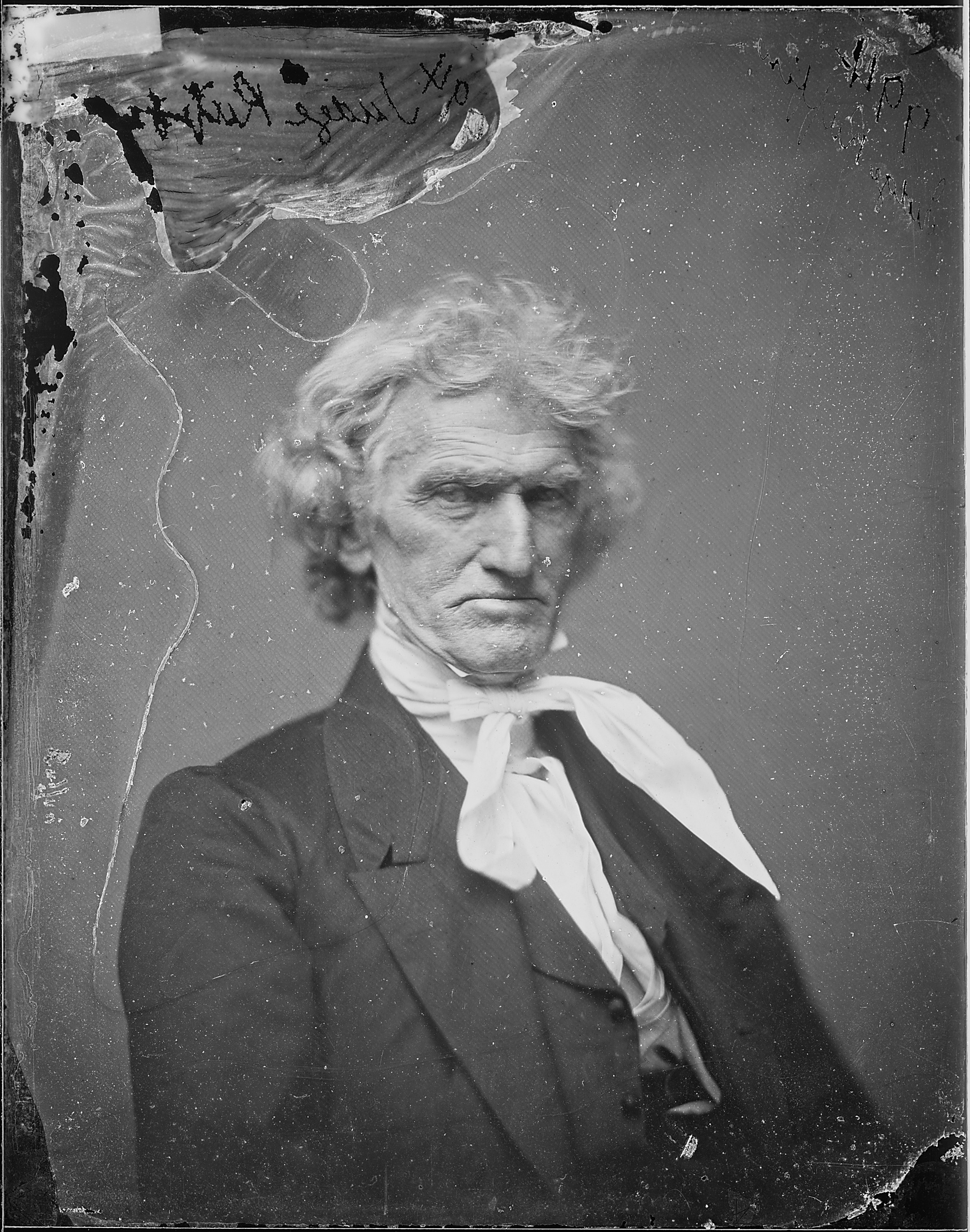
Ruffin in the early 1860s

Together, Justice William Gaston and Ruffin, whom his colleagues elected Chief Justice in 1833 (by a coin toss, according to a popular but probably apocryphal account), dominated their less-talented brother judges, rendering treatise-like opinions that inspired one contemporary to exclaim: "No State of the Union . . . not even the United States, ever had a superior Bench; few ever had its equal."

Ruffin was involved, sometimes secretly and illegally, in the slave industry as an enslaver and a slave trader, which led directly to one of his most heinous rulings protecting the institution.

Ruffin delivered the decision in the case of North Carolina v. Mann (1829), which sanctioned the "absolute" power of an enslaver over an enslaved person.

Ruffin also authored the Dougherty v. Stepp (1835), a staple of first-year Torts classes in American law schools used to teach students about the tort of trespass upon real property.

Ruffin retired in 1852 to his plantation in Alamance County, but the legislature called him back to the Court in 1858. He retired again after about one year, at the age of 78.

=== Later life and legacy ===
His home after the end of the American Civil War until he died in 1870, the Ruffin-Roulhac House at Hillsborough, was listed on the National Register of Historic Places in 1971.

In addition to his legal and political career, Ruffin was an innovative farmer and was president of the state's Agricultural Society from 1854 to 1860. In that capacity, he oversaw the North Carolina State Fair operation. He maintained close contact with his cousin Edmund Ruffin, a noted antebellum agricultural reformer.

Ruffin was also a trustee of the University of North Carolina at Chapel Hill for some 24 years. A building at the university, Ruffin Hall, was initially named for him, but in 2020, the university board of trustees decided it would tentatively refer only to his son, Thomas Ruffin Jr.

The unincorporated community of Ruffin, in Rockingham County, is named for Thomas Ruffin.

A statue of Ruffin once stood at the North Carolina Court of Appeals building in Raleigh but was removed in 2020. Later that same year, the North Carolina Supreme Court removed a portrait of Ruffin from its courtroom.

Legal offices
Preceded by Leonard Henderson	Chief Justice of North Carolina Supreme Court; 1833 - 1852	Succeeded by Frederick Nash
