= Godfrey Spruill =

American physician

Doctor Godfrey Spruill was the first medical doctor in North Carolina. He was born about 1650 in Scotland and died in 1719 in North Carolina. He migrated to Virginia sometime before 1684, and moved from Virginia to North Carolina about 1694.

The Land Grant Office in Raleigh, North Carolina, has a record of Godfrey Spruill receiving a grant of 640 acres (2.6 km^{2}) along the Scuppernong River in Tyrrell County on the south side of the Albemarle Sound, North Carolina. Two of his sons were Joseph Spruill and Samuel Spruill. Hezekiah Spruill was one of his grandsons.

== Sources ==
- "Memories and Records of Eastern North Carolina" by Mary Weeks Lambeth
