= Robert Strange =

Robert Strange may refer to:

- Robert Strange (American politician) (1796–1854), U.S. senator
- Robert Straunge (fl. 1614), or Strange, English politician, MP for Cirencester
- Robert Strange (MP for Bristol), see Bristol
- Robert Strange (engraver) (1721–1792), English engraver
- Robert Strange (bishop) (1857–1914), bishop of the Episcopal Diocese of East Carolina
- Robert Strange (actor) (1881–1952), American actor
