= Gabriel Holmes =

American politician (1769–1829)

Member of the U.S. House of Representatives from North Carolina's 5th district
- In office March 4, 1825 – September 26, 1829
- Preceded by: Charles Hooks
- Succeeded by: Edward Bishop Dudley

Governor of North Carolina
- In office December 7, 1821 – December 7, 1824
- Preceded by: Jesse Franklin
- Succeeded by: Hutchins Gordon Burton

Personal details
- Born: 1769 near Clinton, Province of North Carolina, British America
- Died: September 26, 1829 (aged 59–60) near Clinton, North Carolina, U.S.
- Party: Jacksonian
- Education: Harvard University

Gabriel Holmes (1769 – September 26, 1829) was the 21st Governor of the U.S. state of North Carolina from 1821 to 1824. He also served as a Representative from North Carolina. He was non-aligned and represented no political party.

== Biography ==
Gabriel Holmes was born near Clinton in the Province of North Carolina in 1769. He attended Zion Parnassus Academy in Rowan County and Harvard University, studied law in Raleigh, N.C., was admitted to the bar in 1790. and commenced practice in Clinton, N.C. He served in the State House of Commons 1794 and 1795; member of the State Senate 1797–1802, 1812, and 1813; Governor of North Carolina 1821–1824; elected to the Nineteenth, Twentieth, and Twenty-first Congresses and served from March 4, 1825, until his death near Clinton, Sampson County, N.C., September 26, 1829. He was Chairman of the Committee on Expenditures in the Post Office Department (Twentieth Congress).

He was buried in the John Sampson Cemetery. His body was moved there on Memorial Day, 1984, by the Sampson County Historical Society.

He was the father of the Confederate Lieutenant General Theophilus H. Holmes.

== See also ==
- List of members of the United States Congress who died in office (1790–1899)

Political offices
Preceded by Jesse Franklin	Governor of North Carolina; 1821–1824	Succeeded by Hutchins G. Burton
U.S. House of Representatives
Preceded by Charles Hooks	Member of the U.S. House of Representatives from North Carolina's 5th congressional district 1825–1829	Succeeded by Edward B. Dudley
