= Joseph J. Daniel =

American judge

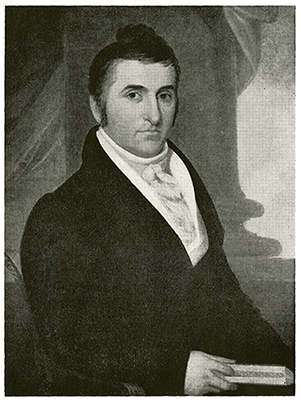
Joseph John Daniel (1784-1848)

Joseph John Daniel (1784–1848) was a North Carolina jurist. He was a cousin of John R. J. Daniel.

Born in Halifax County, North Carolina, Daniel studied law under William R. Davie. He became a respected lawyer and was elected to represent Halifax in the North Carolina House of Commons in 1807, 1811, 1812, and 1815. In 1816, the legislature appointed him to be a superior court judge, and in 1832, it elevated him to the North Carolina Supreme Court, where he served until his death in 1848.

As a superior court judge, Daniel presided over North Carolina v. Mann, the case which provided a famous legal defense of the rights of slaveowners over their property. The jury's verdict and Judge Daniel's sentence were overturned by the North Carolina Supreme Court.
