= William Henry Haywood Jr. =

American politician

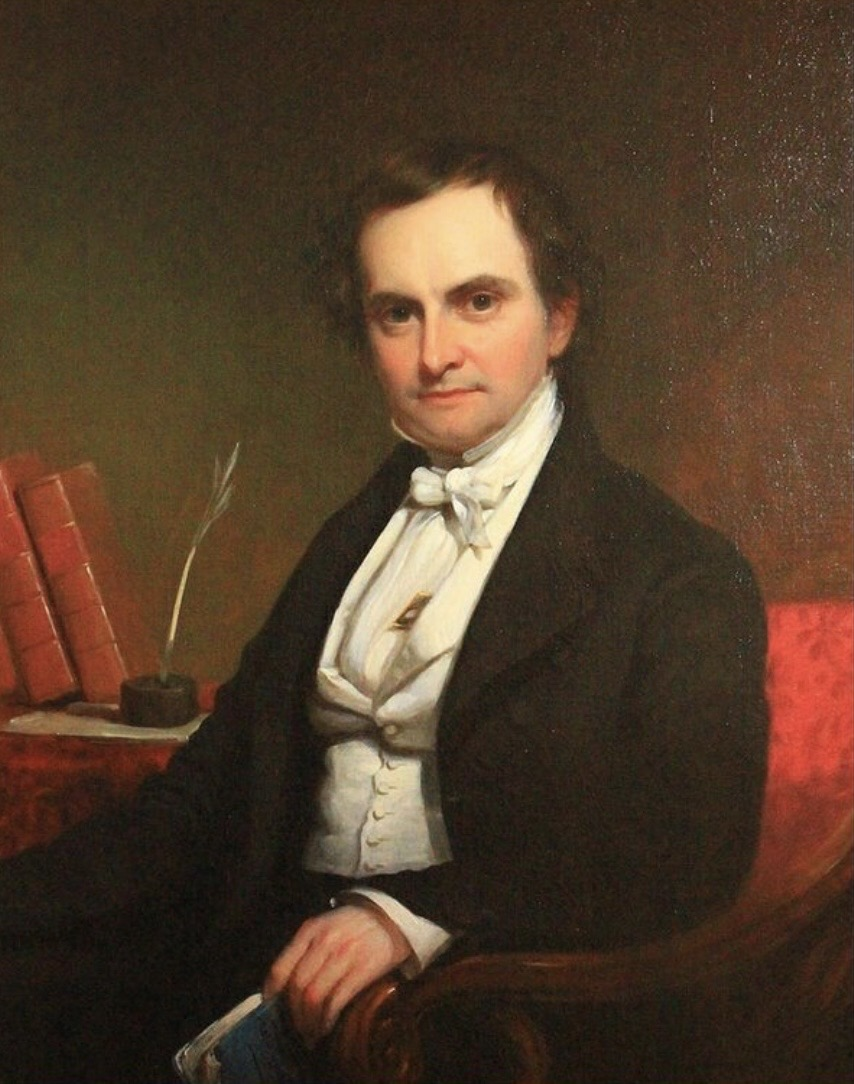

United States Senator from North Carolina
- In office March 4, 1843 – July 25, 1846
- Preceded by: William A. Graham
- Succeeded by: George E. Badger

Member of the North Carolina House of Commons
- In office 1831; 1834-1836

Personal details
- Born: October 23, 1801 Raleigh, North Carolina, U.S.
- Died: October 7, 1852 (aged 50) Raleigh, North Carolina, U.S.
- Resting place: Old City Cemetery; Raleigh, North Carolina, U.S.
- Party: Democratic
- Relatives: Elizabeth Henry Haywood Dudley (sister)

William Henry Haywood Jr. (October 23, 1801 – October 7, 1852) was a Democratic U.S. senator from the state of North Carolina between 1843 and 1846.

Born in Raleigh, North Carolina, to a prominent family, Haywood attended the Raleigh Male Academy and graduated from the University of North Carolina in 1819. Haywood became the first clerk of the vestry of Raleigh's Christ Church (Episcopal) in 1821. He studied law, was admitted to the bar in 1822 and commenced practice in Raleigh. He was a member of the North Carolina State House of Commons (1831 and 1834–1836), serving as speaker the last year. President Martin Van Buren appointed him Chargé d'Affaires to Belgium, but he declined the position.

A member of the Democratic Party, he was elected to the United States Senate and served from March 4, 1843, until July 25, 1846, when he refused to be instructed by the state legislature on a tariff question and resigned. At the time of his resignation, he was chairman of the Committee on Commerce and the Committee on the District of Columbia.

The North Carolina legislature elected Whig George Edmund Badger to replace Haywood in the Senate.

He resumed the practice of law in Raleigh, where he died on October 7, 1852, and was buried in the Old City Cemetery.

== Sources ==
- United States Congress. "William Henry Haywood Jr. (id: H000411)". Biographical Directory of the United States Congress.

U.S. Senate
Preceded by William A. Graham	U.S. senator (Class 3) from North Carolina; 1843–1846; Served alongside: Willie P. Mangum	Succeeded by George E. Badger
