= Hezekiah G. Spruill =

General Henzekiah G. Spruill
- Born: September 8, 1808
- Died: June 20, 1874 (aged 65)
- Buried: Grace Churchyard
- Conflicts: American Civil War

General Hezekiah G. Spruill (September 8, 1808 – June 20, 1874), was the mayor of and a planter in Plymouth in Washington County, North Carolina, during the American Civil War. He had been appointed in 1832 as General of the Militia for the troops of the Albemarle Region of North Carolina. In April 1861, Spruill organized the local troops to prepare for the beginning of the Civil War.

Spruill was married to Anne Louise Garrett Spruill. They are buried in Grace Churchyard, Plymouth, North Carolina. He was the grandson of Colonel Hezekiah Spruill.
