= Hezekiah Spruill =

American planter (1732 – 1804)

Colonel Hezekiah Spruill (January 22, 1732 – March 20, 1804) was an early planter, a member of the North Carolina Provincial Congress and a Captain in the 2nd Battalion of militia in North Carolina. He was the grandson of Dr. Godfrey Spruill, the patriarch of the Spruill family in the United States and the first doctor in North Carolina.

He is buried at the Spruill Family Cemetery in Alligator, Tyrrell County. The following epitaph is found on his tombstone:

My loving friends as you pass by, As you are now, so once was I, As I am now so you must be, Prepare my friends to follow me.

== Military service ==
There was a Captain Spruill in the 2nd Battalion of the North Carolina militia. He served for two months in 1776 under Colonel Peter Dunge and was from Tyrrell County.
