= John R. J. Daniel =

American politician

John Reeves Jones Daniel (January 13, 1802 – June 22, 1868) was a Congressional Representative from North Carolina.

Daniel was born near Halifax, North Carolina and was instructed privately at home. He graduated from the University of North Carolina at Chapel Hill in 1821. After studying law, he was admitted to the North Carolina bar in 1823 and practiced law in Halifax. He was elected to the State house of commons, serving from 1832–34. Daniel was elected attorney general of North Carolina in 1834. The popular politician was elected as a Democrat to the Twenty-seventh United States Congress and to the five succeeding Congresses (March 4, 1841 – March 4, 1853), where he served as Chairman of the Committee on Claims (Twenty-ninth, Thirty-first, and Thirty-second Congresses). Daniel was not a candidate for renomination in 1852 to the Thirty-third Congress. He retired from politics and resumed the practice of law in Halifax. He moved to Louisiana in 1860 and settled near Shreveport, where he continued the practice of law and also engaged in planting. He died in Shreveport and was buried there.

His son, Junius Daniel, became a brigadier general in the Confederate States Army, dying as a result of a mortal wound at the Battle of Spotsylvania Court House in 1864.

== See also ==
- Twenty-seventh United States Congress
- Twenty-ninth United States Congress
- Twenty-eighth United States Congress
- Thirtieth United States Congress
- Thirty-second United States Congress
- Thirty-first United States Congress

Legal offices
Preceded by Romulus Mitchell Saunders	Attorney General of North Carolina; 1835–1841	Succeeded by Hugh McQueen
U.S. House of Representatives
Preceded by Jesse A. Bynum	Member of the U.S. House of Representatives from North Carolina's 2nd congressional district 1841–1843	Succeeded by Daniel M. Barringer
Preceded by Edmund Deberry	Member of the U.S. House of Representatives from North Carolina's 7th congressional district 1843–1847	Succeeded by James I. McKay
Preceded by James I. McKay	Member of the U.S. House of Representatives from North Carolina's 6th congressional district 1847–1853	Succeeded by Richard C. Puryear
