= Cedar Grove Cemetery (New Bern, North Carolina) =

Historic cemetery in New Bern, Craven County, North Carolina

- U.S. National Register of Historic Places
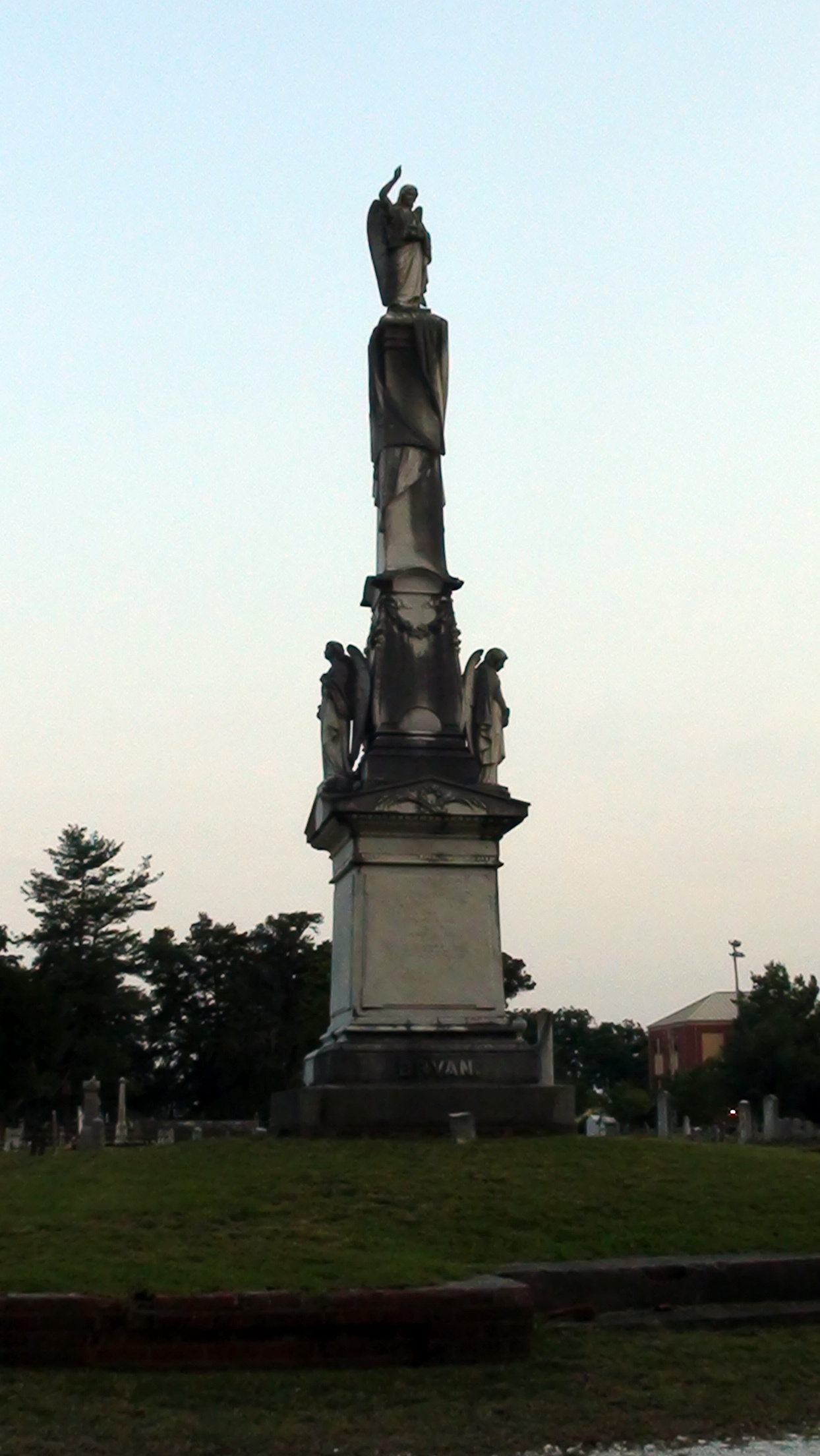
- Monument in Cedar Grove Cemetery (Our Dead), June 2012

- Location within North Carolina Location within the United States
- Location: Bounded by Queen, George, Cypress, Howard, and Metcalf Sts., New Bern, North Carolina
- Coordinates: 35°06′48″N 77°02′36″W
- Area: 12.5 acres (5.1 ha)
- Built: 1800
- NRHP reference No.: 72000936
- Added to NRHP: December 5, 1972

Cedar Grove Cemetery is a historic cemetery located at New Bern, Craven County, North Carolina. It was established in 1800 and is surrounded by an impressive paneled coquina wall built in 1853, which is interrupted by a tall triple-arch entrance. The cemetery contains family burial plots, some enclosed with cast iron fencing, and includes a Confederate memorial. The cemetery was owned by Christ Episcopal Church until 1853, when it was transferred to the town of New Bern.

It was listed on the National Register of Historic Places in 1972.

== Notable burials ==
- Congressman Charles Laban Abernethy (1872–1955)
- Congressman Graham Arthur Barden (1896–1967)
- Pepsi inventor Caleb Bradham (1867–1934)
- Congressman Samuel M. Brinson (1870–1922)
- Author Mary Bayard Devereux Clarke
- Superior Court Judge, State Comptroller, and military officer William J. Clarke (1819–1886)
- Congressman Richard Spaight Donnell (1820–1867)
- Congressman and jurist William Gaston (1788–1844)
- Educator Moses Griffin
- Confederate General Robert Ransom, Jr. (1828–1892)
- Congressman Charles Biddle Shepard (1808–1843)
- Congressman Furnifold McLendel Simmons (1854–1940)
- Congressman John Stanly (1774–1833)
- Congressman Charles R. Thomas (1827–1891)
- Congressman Charles R. Thomas (1861–1931)
- Congressman William Henry Washington (1854–1940)
- Artist William Joseph Williams (1813–1860)
