= William J. Clarke =

American politician and military officer (1819–1886)

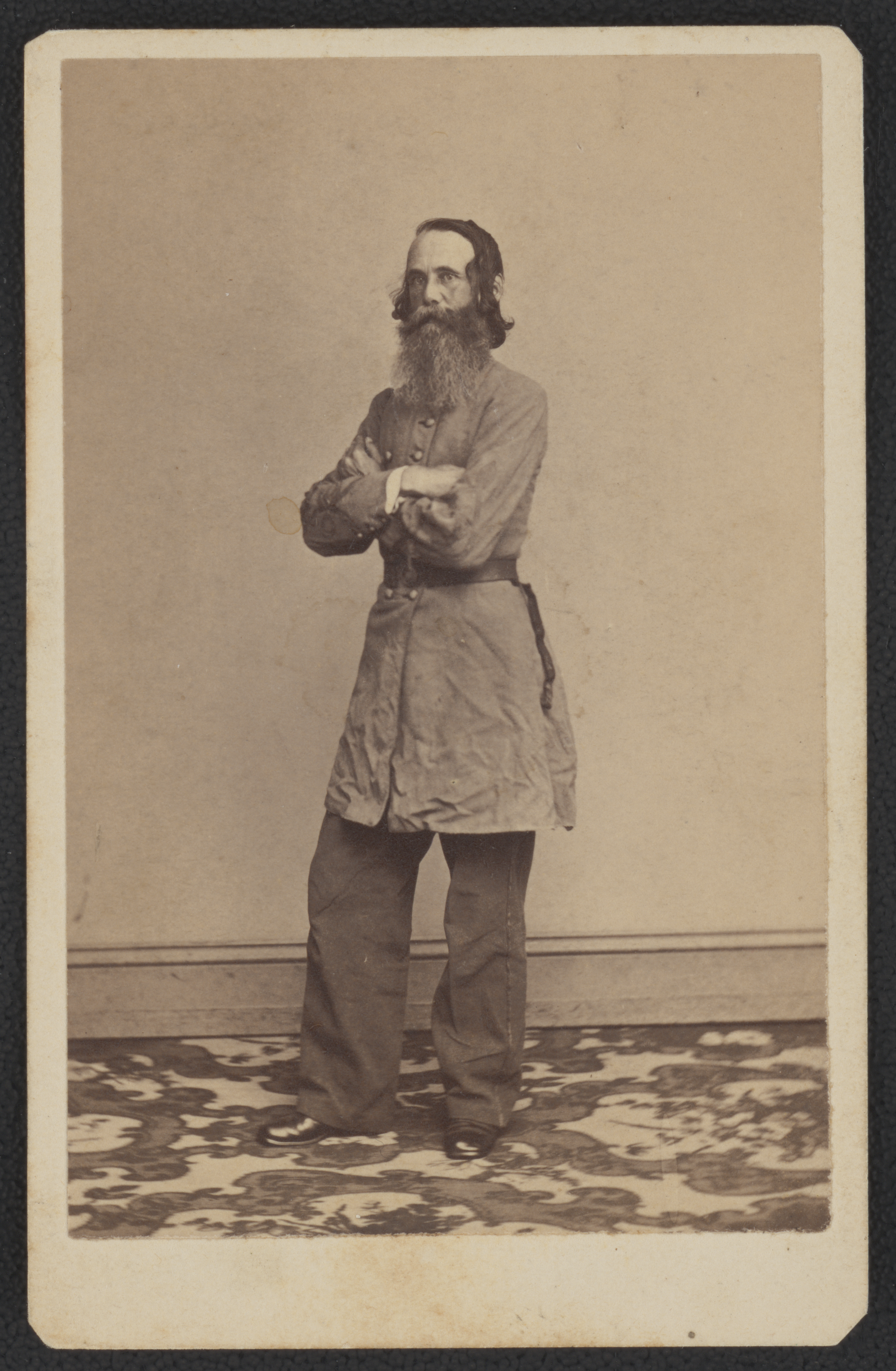
- Clarke in Confederate Army uniform

Judge of the North Carolina Superior Court
- In office 1871–1874
- Appointed by: William Woods Holden

North Carolina State Comptroller
- In office 1851–1855

Personal details
- Born: August 2, 1819 Raleigh, North Carolina, U.S.
- Died: January 23, 1886 (aged 66) New Bern, North Carolina, U.S.
- Resting place: Cedar Grove Cemetery
- Party: Democratic (1849–1868); Republican (1868–1874); Independent (1874)
- Spouse: Mary Bayard Devereux
- Children: 3
- Education: University of North Carolina at Chapel Hill
- Occupation: lawyer judge military officer

Military service
- Allegiance: Confederate States of America; United States
- Branch/service: (Confederate States of America) Confederate States Army; United States Army
- Years of service: 1846–1870
- Rank: Colonel (Confederate States); Major (United States); Major general (NC state militia)
- Battles/wars: Mexican–American War; American Civil War • Battle of Proctor's Creek; Kirk–Holden war

William John Clarke (August 2, 1819 – January 23, 1886) was an American military officer, lawyer, and politician. He served as North Carolina State Comptroller from 1850 to 1855 and sat on the North Carolina Superior Court from 1871 to 1874. Clarke also served as the president of the San Antonio and Mexican Gulf Railroad while living in Texas.

== Early life ==
William John Clarke was born on August 2, 1819, in Raleigh, North Carolina to Ann Maria Robadeau and William F. Clarke. Robadeau died a few years later and Clarke remarried, giving birth to three additional children. William John attended the University of North Carolina at Chapel Hill, graduating in 1841. He was a charter member of the university's alumni association in 1843 and earned a master's degree in 1844. He then read law under an attorney in Raleigh, befriending fellow law student William Woods Holden. He and Holden organized a memorial parade in Raleigh after Andrew Jackson's death in 1845.

On April 6, 1848, Clarke married Mary Bayard Devereux of Raleigh in Lafourche Parish, Louisiana. (Note: The two had first met at the wedding of John Primrose—a friend of Clarke—and Eliza Tarbox—a friend of Devereux's late mother—on October 19, 1843.) They later had four children.

== Antebellum career ==
Following the outbreak of the Mexican–American War, Clarke raised a company of soldiers and was commissioned captain. He served with the 12th U.S. Infantry. Wounded at the Battle of National Bridge, he was promoted to major before his unit was disbanded on July 25, 1848.

Clarke began practicing law in Raleigh in 1849. He also launched a candidacy for the U.S. House of Representatives seat in North Carolina's 6th congressional district as a Democrat. In campaign literature he declared that he favored strict constructionism in interpreting the U.S. Constitution and was opposed to federal restrictions on slavery. He lost the race to the incumbent, fellow Democrat John R. J. Daniel. Clarke was elected state comptroller in 1850 and served from 1851 to 1855.

With the family financially struggling and job prospects slim, the Clarkes moved to Cuba in 1855, where Clarke attempted to secure an appointment as U.S. consul. In 1856, the Clarke family relocated to San Antonio, Texas. While there he practiced law and served as president of the San Antonio and Mexican Gulf Railroad.

== Military service during the Civil War ==
Upon the outbreak of the American Civil War, Clarke joined the Confederate States Army as a captain and participated in the seizure of the federal arsenal at San Antonio. He shortly thereafter returned to North Carolina and was made a colonel of 14th North Carolina Volunteers, mustered at Weldon in July 1861. It was reorganized as the 24th North Carolina Infantry near Murfreesboro in May 1862. During the Battle of Proctor's Creek on May 15, 1864, his shoulder was shattered by shrapnel. Sent away to convalesce, he was captured while attempting to rejoin his forces in Virginia and held as a prisoner of war at Fort Delaware from January to July 1865. He was released on parole. Returning home in poor physical and mental health, in the aftermath of the war he struggled with alcoholism. Writing to their eldest son in 1866, Deveraux said, "he has never been himself since he was in prison for more than a little while...his mind is weakened and he is very irritable." Clarke wanted to return to Texas after the war but his wife's preference for North Carolina prevailed.

== Post-war career ==
=== Business, legal, and political activities ===
In the aftermath of the war, Clarke and his family lived in Boon Hill while he tended to various business interests, including a lumber mill, an iron works in Selma, and a mine outside of Greensboro. Often in New Bern on business, he eventually move there with his family. There he practiced law and served as a trustee and principal of the New Bern Academy from 1869 to 1870. His wife became an active member of local civic life and wrote to support the family.

Clarke initially attended local Conservative Party meetings. Despite his prewar allegiance to the Democratic Party, in 1868 he announced that he had joined the Republican Party, shocking some of his friends and family. Historian Samuel B. McGuire speculated that Clarke's change of partisan affiliation may have been motivated by political opportunism or his disgust with the violence of the Ku Klux Klan. Historian Paul D. Escott attributed his switch to opportunities for patronage, growing disillusionment with the pro-Confederate sympathies of the Conservatives, and increasing interaction with and attachment to Northerners and Republicans. Of his political pursuits, Clarke wrote in his diary, "I know not whether I have acted wisely, but God knows that none but patriotic just and humane motions influenced me." His wife, who had previously been critical of Republicans in her writing, remained apparently supportive of him and avoided political commentary thereafter. In turn, he permitted her significant independence in how she conducted her public life. He expressed concern over her independent thinking, particularly with regards to Christian religion, in the 1870s, but she rejected his appeals and he did not press the matter.

In 1868, Clarke publicly campaigned for Republican candidates and supported the candidacy of Ulysses S. Grant in the 1868 United States presidential election. For this activity he was ostracized by his Conservative acquaintances. In 1869, William Woods Holden, then serving as the Republican governor of the state, appointed Clarke to serve as the state's proxy on the board of directors of the Atlantic and North Carolina Railroad.

=== Kirk–Holden war ===
Over the course of 1868 and 1869, Klan violence in opposition to Reconstruction policies increased dramatically across North Carolina. Governor Holden appealed for an end to the violence and hired detectives to arrest Klansmen. Clarke served as a state prosecutor for Klansmen arrested in Lenoir County and tried in New Bern. Despite this, the situation worsened in Alamance and Caswell counties in 1870, where, respectively, a black town commissioner was lynched and a Republican state senator was assassinated.

On June 8, Holden hosted a meeting of Republicans in Raleigh to discuss the possible responses to the Klan. Clarke was among them. U.S. Senator John Pool recommended that militiamen be sent to arrest Klansmen and that they be put through a military tribunal. Holden eventually agreed with Pool, and then moved on to discuss the make-up of the militia to be raised. The officials ruled out the use of the regular state militia—who they thought sympathized with the Klan—and the use of a black militia—which they feared would worsen race relations. They concluded that a force of white militiamen should be raised among western North Carolinians and that it should be led by a man from the mountains, a Republican political stronghold. They also agreed that another militia contingent of Piedmont and eastern North Carolinians be mustered to occupy the state capital at the same time. Once the western force had suppressed the Klan, detachments of both groups would be dispatched around the state to protect polling stations for the elections scheduled for August.

On June 9, Holden commissioned Clarke as commander of the 1st North Carolina State Troops, which was to serve as the eastern and Piedmont militia. George Washington Kirk was given command of the western militia, known as the 2nd North Carolina State Troops. Holden dispatched Clarke to Washington, D.C., to obtain federal materiel assistance from President Grant and the Secretary of War, which he secured. During this time, Holden completely reorganized the regular state militia, choosing officers he perceived to be widely respected in the hopes that such an action would allay public concerns about the deployment of troops. The changes were announced on June 22. Clarke was made a major general of the "1st Division". By early July, he had begun shipping military equipment from Fort Monroe in Virginia to eastern North Carolina.

The 1st North Carolina State Troops arrived in Raleigh on July 19, and made camp at Old Baptist Grove, several blocks from the North Carolina State Capitol. These troops played a minimal role in the ensuing anti-Klan action. Clarke ordered some troops to ferry supplies to Kirk's forces in Alamance County and posted a guard at the local arsenal. In anticipation of state legislative elections to be held on August 4, Clarke sent a portion of Company B to Carthage in Moore County, men from Company D to Chapel Hill in Orange County, and a detachment of Company D to Goldsboro in Wayne County. The state elections were conducted peacefully and without incident. The Democrats scored a major victory, winning back the majority of seats in the General Assembly, while the Republicans garnered 13,000 fewer votes than they had in 1868. Historians have concluded that this was due to Klan intimidation, accusations of financial corruption levied at Republicans, and the view that Holden's deployment of the militias was tyrannical. Clarke attributed negative public reaction to the militia intervention to "deep hatred to the U.S. government, and prejudice against the negro."

The Republicans' defeat greatly dispirited the militiamen in Raleigh. Early on the morning of August 8, a drunken United States Army soldier stumbled towards the camp at Old Baptist Grove. The militia sentry on duty ordered him to stop and identify himself, and when the soldier failed to heed his warnings, the sentry shot him in the legs. Army officials were infuriated by the incident, but Clarke defended the actions of the sentry and the Raleigh mayor hosted a special hearing and acquitted him of any wrongdoing. Afterwards, the militia camp was moved several blocks. Holden ordered the militias to disband on September 21, but retained a portion of the 1st North Carolina State Troops to act as bodyguards for two weeks to forestall any assassination attempts. In a letter to his son, Clarke wrote that while he was "approaching the end of one of the most disagreeable services I ever performed" he had done "nothing to be ashamed of" and "must wait for time to vindicate me". The affair came to be known as the Kirk-Holden war and resulted in Holden being impeached and removed from office in 1871.

=== Later activities ===
Clarke won election to the North Carolina Senate 10th district seat representing Craven County but, under intense political pressure for his role in the militia, resigned before ever taking his seat on September 22 and accepted Holden's appointment to a judgeship. He served as a judge of the North Carolina Superior Court from 1871 to 1874. Not re-nominated to the post by the state Republican convention in 1874, he campaigned as an independent, appealing to Republicans to support him in contesting "a clique of Northern men, who assume to lead the party, and who have been guilty of acts, which, if persisted in, will be of the most ruinous tendency to the party." He ultimately lost the election to Augustus Sherrill Seymour.

Despite being out of office, Clarke remained influential in Republican circles. In 1877, Clarke began mentoring future congressman George Henry White as a student of law at his practice in New Bern. In 1878, the Democratic-controlled Craven County board of commissioners rejected the official bond of the Republican who had won election as the county clerk of Superior Court. Seymour appointed Clarke to fill the vacancy, though his assumption of office was delayed for two months while the board scrutinized his bond. He ultimately served from 1879 to 1880. Clarke was appointed to the newly-created Board of Newbern Harbor Commissioners in 1879.

Clarke started publication of a Republican weekly newspaper, The Signal, in Raleigh in December 1879. His wife contributed articles and poetry to the publication. He turned the paper over to the Republican State Committee in July 1880. Later in his career, Clarke declared that the Republican Party's broadest potential for appeal lay in its support of workers' rights, and further argued that it should promote free and fair elections and a return to local government home rule in the state. He also called for workers and artisans in North Carolina to gather in Raleigh and advocate collectively for their own interests.

== Later life ==
After quitting his involvement with The Signal, Clarke focused his energies on his New Bern law practice. His health was in decline, however, and historian Benjamin Justesen speculated that most of the legal work was actually carried out by his son. He died on January 23, 1886, in New Bern. He was subsequently buried in the city's Cedar Grove Cemetery. Historian Deborah Beckel credited Clarke's efforts to direct the Republican Party towards an embrace of workers' rights and basic elections demands for presaging its later Fusionist success.

== Works cited ==
- Beckel, Deborah (2011). Radical Reform: Interracial Politics in Post-Emancipation North Carolina. Charlottesville: University of Virginia Press. ISBN 978-0-8139-3002-2.
- Brisson, Jim D. (April 2011). "'Civil Government Was Crumbling Around Me': The Kirk-Holden War of 1870". The North Carolina Historical Review. 8 (2): 123–163. JSTOR 23523540.
- Censer, Jane Turner (2010). "Mary Bayard Clarke's Plain-Folk Humor: Writing Women into the Literature and Politics of Reconstruction". The Journal of Southern History. 76 (2): 241–274. JSTOR 25700053.
- Cheney, John L. Jr., ed. (1981). North Carolina Government, 1585-1979: A Narrative and Statistical History (revised ed.). Raleigh: North Carolina Secretary of State. OCLC 1290270510.
- Clark, Walter, ed. (1901). Histories of the Several Regiments and Battalions from North Carolina, in the Great War 1861-'65. Vol. II. Goldsboro. LCCN 02026034.
- Escott, Paul D. (1985). Many Excellent People : Power and Privilege in North Carolina, 1850-1900. Chapel Hill: University of North Carolina Press. ISBN 978-0-8078-1651-6.
- Gillespie, Michele; McMillen, Sally Gregory, eds. (2014). North Carolina Women : Their Lives and Times. Athens: University of Georgia Press. ISBN 9780820339993.
- Justesen, Benjamin R. (2012). George Henry White: An Even Chance in the Race of Life (reprint ed.). Baton Rouge: Louisiana State University Press. ISBN 9780807144770.
- Massengill, Stephen E. (1985). "The Detectives of William W. Holden, 1869–1870". North Carolina Historical Review. 62 (4): 448–487. ISSN 0029-2494. JSTOR 23518497.
- McGuire, Samuel B. (May 2012). "'Rally Union Men in Defence of your State!': Appalachian Militiamen in the Kirk-Holden War, 1870". Appalachian Journal. 39 (3): 294–323. ISSN 0090-3779.
- McGuire, Samuel B. (July 2014). "The Making of a Black Militia Company: New Bern Troops in the Kirk-Holden War, 1870". The North Carolina Historical Review. 91 (3): 288–322. JSTOR 44113199.
- Raper, Horace W. (1985). William W. Holden: North Carolina's Political Enigma. Chapel Hill: University of North Carolina Press. ISBN 0807850608.
- Watson, Alan D. (1987). A History of New Bern and Craven County. New Bern: Tryon Palace Commission. OCLC 17398679.
