= Thomas Hickman Williams =

American politician

United States Senator from Mississippi
- In office November 12, 1838 – March 3, 1839
- Preceded by: James F. Trotter
- Succeeded by: John Henderson

Personal details
- Born: January 20, 1801 Williamson County, Tennessee, US
- Died: May 3, 1851 (aged 50) Pontotoc, Mississippi, US
- Party: Democratic

Thomas Hickman Williams (January 20, 1801 – May 3, 1851) was a United States Senator from Mississippi. Born in Williamson County, Tennessee, he attended the common schools, moved to Mississippi and settled in Pontotoc County, and engaged in planting. He was appointed and subsequently elected as a Democrat to the U.S. Senate to fill the vacancy caused by the resignation of James F. Trotter and served from November 12, 1838, to March 3, 1839. He ran as a candidate in the 1843 Mississippi gubernatorial election, losing to Albert G. Brown. He was secretary and treasurer of the University of Mississippi at Oxford from 1845 to 1851 and was known as "Father of the State University," being the first to propose it and also aiding to secure it.

Williams died on his plantation south of Pontotoc in 1851.

U.S. Senate
Preceded by James F. Trotter	U.S. senator (Class 1) from Mississippi; 1838–1839; Served alongside: Robert J. Walker	Succeeded by John Henderson
