= Charles Biddle (disambiguation) =

Charles Biddle (1745–1821) was Vice-President of Pennsylvania.

Charles Biddle may also refer to:

- Charlie Biddle (1926–2003), Canadian jazz bassist
- Charles John Biddle (1819–1873), U.S. Representative from Pennsylvania
- Charles J. Biddle (aviator) (1890–1972), American World War I fighter pilot

== See also ==
- Charles Biddle Shepard (1808–1843), American politician
