= 1841 Mississippi gubernatorial election =

- November 1, 1841
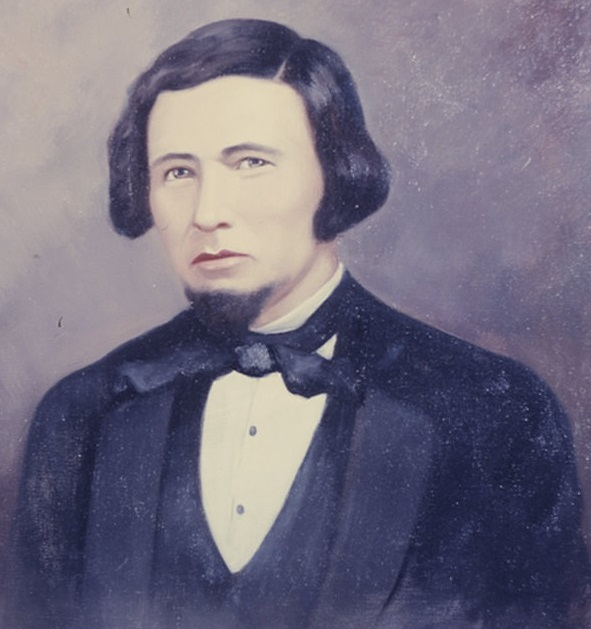

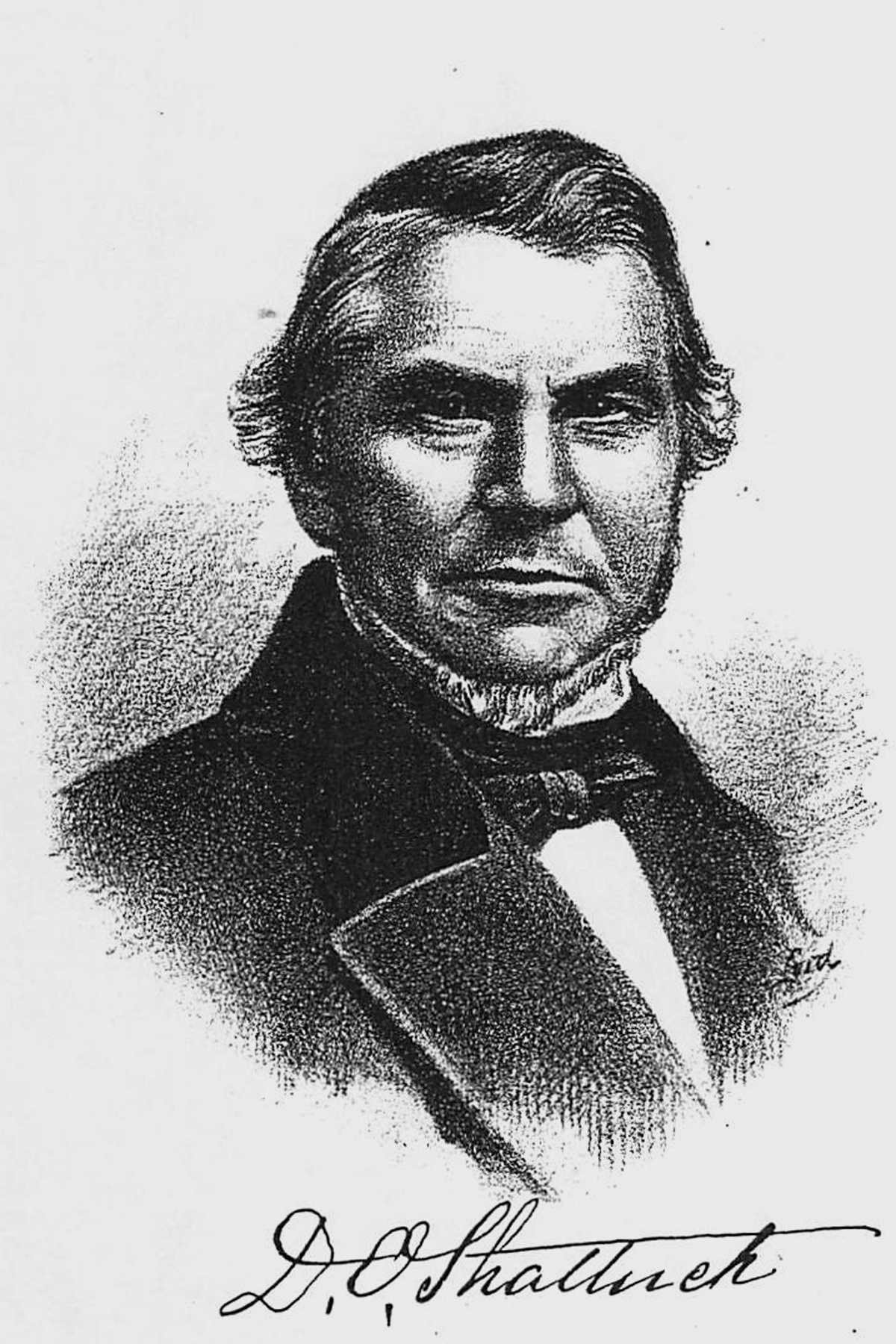
Nominee	Tilghman Tucker	David Olcott Shattuck
Party	Democratic	Whig
Popular vote	19,059	16,784
Percentage	53.17%	46.83%
- County results Tucker: 50–60% 60–70% 70–80% 80–90% >90% Shattuck: 50–60% 60–70% 80–90% No Returns
Governor before election
Alexander G. McNutt
Democratic
Elected Governor
Albert G. Brown
Democratic

The 1841 Mississippi gubernatorial election was held on November 1, 1841, to elect the governor of Mississippi. Tilghman Tucker, a Democrat won against Whig candidate Judge David Olcott Shattuck.

== General election ==
The 1841 election centered around the same controversy towards the Union Bank bonds as the 1839 gubernatorial election. Established in 1838 as a response to the economic turmoil stemming from President Jackson's policies and the Panic of 1837, the Union Bank became a focal point of contention. The state faced a divisive debate between anti-bond Democrats, led by Tilghman M. Tucker, advocating for the repudiation of the Union Bank bonds, and their opponents, the "Bond-Payer Democrats" aligned with the Whigs, pushing for payment. In a closely contested election, Tilghman M. Tucker emerged victorious as the Democratic candidate, defeating Whig candidate Judge David O. Shattuck.

== Results ==
Mississippi gubernatorial election, 1841
Party	Candidate	Votes	%
Democratic	Tilghman Tucker	19,059	53.17%
Whig	David Olcott Shattuck	16,784	46.83%
Total votes		35,843	100.00
Democratic hold			
