= Eli Huston =

American judge (c. 1799–1835)

Justice of the Supreme Court of Mississippi
- In office 1832–1832
- Preceded by: John Black
- Succeeded by: Court reorganized

Personal details
- Born: c. 1799 Kentucky, U.S.
- Died: 12 June 1835 (aged 35–36) Natchez, Mississippi, U.S.
- Relatives: Felix Huston (brother)
- Profession: Lawyer, judge

Eli Huston (sometimes spelled Houston; c. 1799 – June 12, 1835) was a Mississippi lawyer who served as a justice of the Supreme Court of Mississippi in 1832.

Born in Kentucky to Joseph Huston, he was the older brother of Felix Huston. Huston moved to Natchez, Mississippi, where he established a successful law practice. Huston was appointed to a seat on the state supreme court vacated by Justice John Black in 1832, "but was on the bench only a few months, owing to the changes of the revised constitution".

Arkansas Governor Robert Crittenden, in an 1834 letter to his brother, described meeting Huston during a trip to Mississippi: "My reception there was most flattering, especially by Eli Huston who is one the first lawyers in the state — I had not known him before. He is an estimable man, and missconceived in character greatly".

Huston died after an illness of several weeks. Following his death, the members of the Natchez Bar of Adams County held a meeting to memorialize Huston, and resolved to assist with the arrangements for his funeral.

Political offices
Preceded by John Black	Justice of the Supreme Court of Mississippi; 1832–1832	Succeeded by Court reorganized
