= Robert J. Walker =

American lawyer, economist and politician

Robert Walker
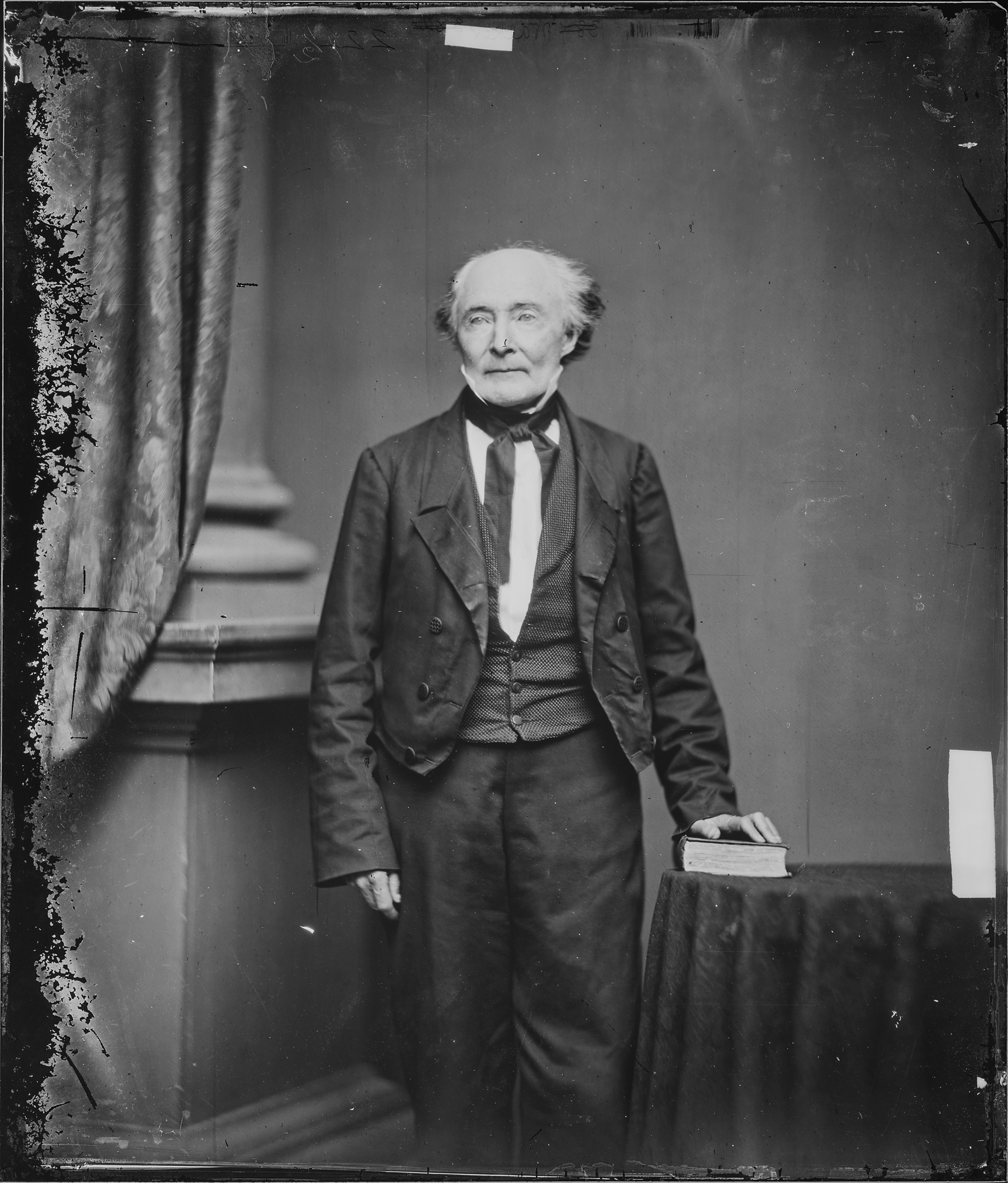

4th Territorial Governor of Kansas
- In office May 27, 1857 – December 15, 1857
- Preceded by: John W. Geary
- Succeeded by: James W. Denver

18th United States Secretary of the Treasury
- In office March 8, 1845 – March 5, 1849
- President: James K. Polk; Zachary Taylor
- Preceded by: George M. Bibb
- Succeeded by: William M. Meredith

United States Senator from Mississippi
- In office March 4, 1835 – March 5, 1845
- Preceded by: George Poindexter
- Succeeded by: Joseph W. Chalmers

Personal details
- Born: Robert James Walker; July 19, 1801 Northumberland, Pennsylvania, U.S.
- Died: November 11, 1869 (aged 68) Washington, D.C., U.S.
- Party: Democratic
- Spouse: Mary Bache
- Children: 5, including Duncan
- Education: University of Pennsylvania (BA)

Robert James Walker (July 19, 1801 – November 11, 1869) was an American lawyer, economist and politician. An active member of the Democratic Party, he served as a member of the U.S. Senate from Mississippi from 1835 until 1845, as Secretary of the Treasury from 1845 to 1849 during the administration of President James K. Polk, and briefly as Territorial Governor of Kansas in 1857. He was responsible for drafting the 1849 bill that eventually established the United States Department of the Interior.

As senator, Walker vigorously supported the annexation of Texas. As Secretary of the Treasury, he held responsibility for the management of funds relating to the Mexican–American War. He contributed to a bill called the Walker tariff, which reduced rates to some of the lowest in history. Walker was appointed Governor of Kansas in 1857 by President James Buchanan but resigned shortly after due to his opposition to the administration-sponsored pro-slavery Lecompton Constitution. After his retirement from politics, Walker supported the United States during the American Civil War and continued to practice law in Washington, D.C.

== Early life and education ==
Born in Northumberland, Pennsylvania, to Revolutionary War veteran and Pennsylvania judge, Jonathan Hoge Walker (July 20, 1754 – March 23, 1824) and his wife Lucretia ("Lucy") Duncan Walker (1770–1837), he and his brother Duncan S. Walker grew up in Bellefonte, Pennsylvania, from 1806 to 1814, where Jonathan Walker served as presiding judge of the judicial district. Judge Walker become the first judge of the U.S. District Court for the Western District of Pennsylvania in 1818 (after nomination by President James Monroe and confirmation by the Senate) and served until his death. Initially educated at the Bellefonte Academy, Robert Walker graduated in 1819 at the top of his class at the University of Pennsylvania where he was a member of the Philomathean Society.

He married Mary Blechynden Bache Walker and had five children, including Duncan Stephen Walker. His wife was a niece of George M. Dallas, great-granddaughter of Benjamin Franklin, and granddaughter of Alexander J. Dallas. His marriage reportedly help him advanced his political career.

Walker was 5'2 and had curly black hair. He was known for a quick temper. He challenged numerous people to duels, but no one accepted.

== Career ==
Admitted to the Pennsylvania bar in Pittsburgh in 1821, Walker practiced law in Pittsburgh from 1822 until 1826 when he moved to Natchez, Mississippi, where his father had died in 1824 at the home of his brother Duncan Walker. Robert Walker then joined his brother, Duncan Walker, in a lucrative law practice. Walker and his uncle also speculated in cotton, land and slaves. According to the editors of The Papers of Jefferson Davis, he "engaged in land speculation on an enormous scale, accumulating, in addition to land, several hundred thousand dollars in debts...Joseph E. Davis, Jefferson Davis' elder brother, was a member of the land syndicate organized by Walker and William M. Gwin."

However, his brother Duncan (a former Mississippi legislator) moved to Texas in 1834 for health reasons, where he became involved in land speculation and the growing independence movement. For his involvement in the abortive Texas Revolution of 1835, Duncan Walker was imprisoned in Mexico, and traveled to Cuba after his release, where he died on December 31, 1835 (causing his brother Robert to inherit property in Texas).

=== U.S. Senator (1835–1845) ===
Robert Walker became politically prominent during the Nullification Crisis of 1832, even arguing the federal government's right to coerce rebellious states and earning praise from former President James Madison. In 1836 Walker became the Union candidate for U.S. Senate from Mississippi and won election over the incumbent George Poindexter, who had criticized him for rigging bids to purchase land that Mississippi had acquired from the Choctaw as a result of the Treaty of Dancing Rabbit Creek (1831). Walker served in the United States Senate as a Unionist Democrat from 1835 to 1845, winning re-election by a two to one margin over Sergeant S. Prentiss, as well as convincing Mississippi legislators to adopt resolutions denouncing nullification and secession as treason.

An ardent expansionist, Walker supported the administration of President Andrew Jackson and (perhaps to continue his brother's legacy) voted for recognition of the Republic of Texas in 1837 and in January 1844 proposed annexation of Texas, subject to gradual emancipation and colonization of its black population, for which John C. Calhoun criticized him. Nonetheless, Walker proposed the joint annexation resolution of 1845. He also worked for the nomination and election of James K. Polk in 1844, in part because President Martin Van Buren opposed annexation. Walker also favored the award of public lands to new states and proposed a Homestead bill in 1836. He also endorsed a low tariff (which favored his state's farming interests); opposed distribution of the federal surplus funds for fear of creating an excuse to raise tariff rates; and, significantly, supported the independent Treasury system idea. He also opposed the Bank of the United States, and later repeal of the Missouri Compromise of 1820.

As a Mississippi senator and slaveholder himself, Walker passionately defended slavery, while also opposing the African slave trade and favoring gradual emancipation and the efforts of the American Colonization Society. He stressed its economic benefits, and claimed slaves/African Americans would fall into turpitude or insanity without firm masters. However, in 1838 Walker freed some of his slaves.

Walker also claimed that independent Texas had to be annexed to prevent it from falling into the hands of Great Britain, which would use it to spread subversion throughout the South. He warned Northerners that if Britain succeeded in undermining slavery, the freed slaves would go north, where "the poor-house and the jail, the asylums of the deaf and dumb, the blind, the idiot and insane, would be filled to overflowing."

=== Secretary of the Treasury (1845–1849) ===
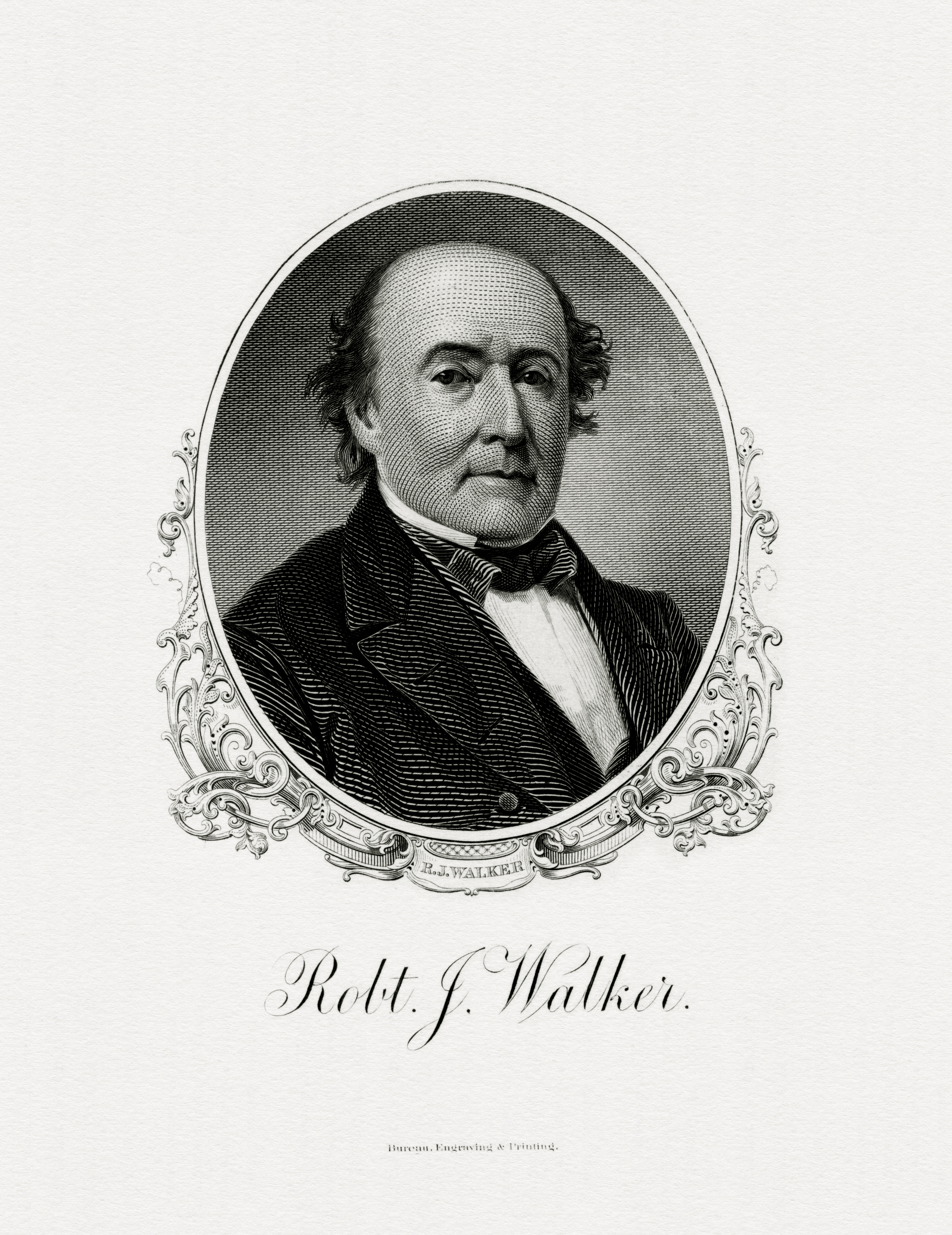
Bureau of Engraving and Printing portrait of Walker as Secretary of the Treasury

Upon the recommendation of Vice President George M. Dallas, the uncle of Walker's wife, newly elected President Polk nominated Walker to become U.S. Secretary of the Treasury, and fellow Senators confirmed him. Walker served in that position throughout the Polk administration (from March 8, 1845, until March 5, 1849), and was an influential member of the President's Cabinet.

Walker was involved in a prominent Treasury report of December 3, 1845, which attacked the tariff protection system for manufactures yet supported a tariff for revenue. The Walker Tariff of 1846 was based upon the principles of this paper and was in fact largely the secretary's own work. He also drafted the 1849 bill to establish the United States Department of the Interior. Walker also supported the independent treasury system, and established a warehousing system for handling imports that has had lasting influence.

As Treasury Secretary, Walker was responsible for financing the Mexican–American War, but did so very loosely. On February 23, 1848, he wrote to Major General William Orlando Butler, "Sir, Upon the ratification of a treaty of peace by the Republic of Mexico in conformity with the provisions of the act of the congress of the United States of America approved March 3, 1847 stated 'an act making further appropriation to bring the existing war with Mexico to a speedy and honorable conclusion' you are authorized to draw on this department for any sum not exceeding three millions of dollars to be paid in pursuance of the promotion of said act."

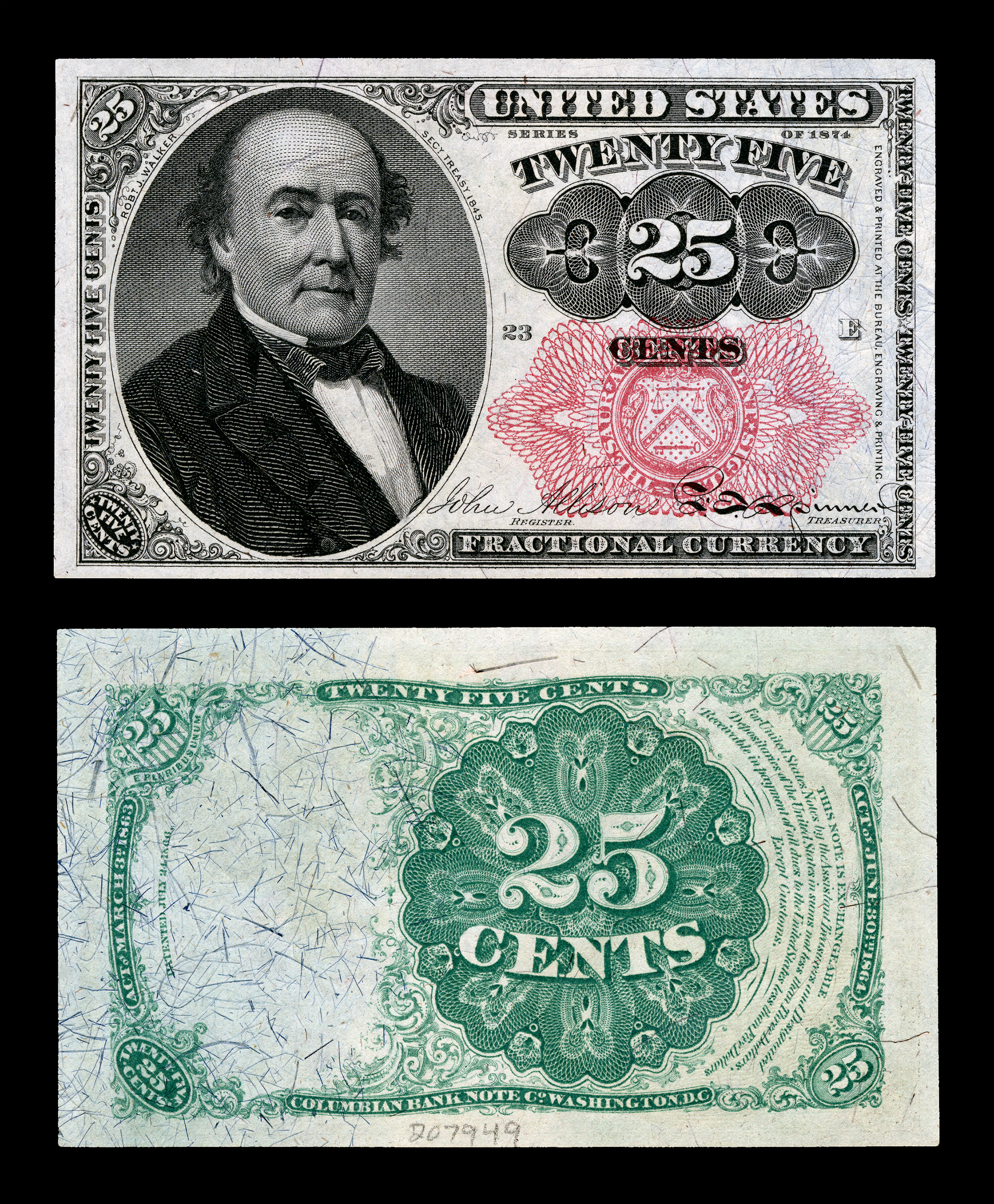
Walker depicted on the 5th issue 25-cent Fractional currency note

During the Mexican-American War, the U.S. Treasury appeared short of money. An astonishingly large amount of funds (about $6 million) had been withdrawn from the army's quartermaster and commissary departments. Investigation disclosed that $1.1 million of those funds had been deposited in the bank of Corcoran and Riggs, which in turn invested the funds in stock securities. Polk, who had run on an anti-bank platform, wrote in his diary that it was the most troubling moment of his presidency. Confronting Walker yielded only casual, vague replies. Polk ordered an investigation, but Walker still could not give Polk the answers he needed. Eventually Walker told Polk that the $600,000 remaining in the bankers' hands would be distributed to the army and Polk lost interest in the matter. No chicanery was proven before the investigation was dropped. However, before Walker's initial appointment, Polk's mentor Andrew Jackson had warned him "that Walker wasn't a man to be trusted with the nation's cash."

After leaving Treasury in 1849, Walker resumed his legal practice in Washington, D.C. He and Edwin Stanton became Pittsburgh's lawyers in the city's (and Pennsylvania's, represented by its attorney general Cornelius Darragh) litigation against the Wheeling Suspension Bridge in the United States Supreme Court. His business interests included land speculation and mining stocks.

In 1853, President Franklin Pierce offered Walker the post of United States Minister to China, but Walker declined.

=== Kansas Territorial Governor (1857) ===
Walker at first opposed the Compromise of 1850, but was won over later by the arguments of Illinois Senator Stephen A. Douglas. He was appointed governor of Kansas Territory on May 27, 1857, by President James Buchanan, but resigned in December because of his opposition to the Lecompton Constitution. In a resignation letter to Secretary of State Lewis Cass dated December 15, 1857, he cited clear voting fraud and improper political pressure from the Administration. He did not, however, break with his party immediately, and favored the so-called English Bill. Partly due to his influence, enough anti-Lecompton Democrats were induced to vote for that measure to secure its passage.

=== American Civil War and later life ===
Despite his status as a former Mississippi senator and slave owner, as a Southern Unionist Walker supported the Union cause during the American Civil War. His eldest son, Duncan Stephen Walker, initially commissioned as a Captain of Volunteers in the Union Army, rose to receive a brevet commission as brigadier general on March 13, 1865, for his gallant and meritorious services during that war. The younger Walker initially served as adjutant on the staff of Gen. Nathaniel P. Banks, and later on the staff of Brig. Gen. William H. Emory and finally on the staff of Major Gen. Winfield Scott Hancock. Meanwhile, his father, former Treasury Secretary Walker, sailed to Europe in 1863 as financial agent of the United States, where he fostered confidence in the financial resources of the United States. He secured a loan of $250,000,000 in "5-20" bonds.

Walker resumed his Washington, D.C., law practice upon returning from Europe in November 1864, and also continued publishing on financial topics until his death in the national capital five years later. Both during and after the Civil War he was a contributor to the Continental Monthly, which for a short time he also published, with James R. Gilmore. In 1865 he proposed to Secretary of State William H. Seward that the United States buy Greenland and probably Iceland too.

== Death and legacy ==
Walker died in Washington, D.C., on November 11, 1869. He is buried at Washington's Oak Hill Cemetery. His son-in-law Benjamin H. Brewster became Attorney General under Chester A. Arthur. Many of his papers are held by the University of Pittsburgh, which has digitized them.

Initially, Walker County, Texas, was named in his honor. However, due to Walker's support of the Union during the Civil War, the Texas Legislature withdrew the honor and honored Samuel Walker (no relation), a Texas Ranger, instead.

The survey ship Robert J. Walker, which served in the United States Coast Survey from 1848 to 1860, was named for Walker.

A merchant vessel named Robert J. Walker was constructed in 1943, and served until its sinking by a German U-boat off the coast of Australia the following year.

U.S. Senate
| Preceded by George Poindexter | U.S. Senator (Class 2) from Mississippi; 1835–1845; Served alongside: John Black, James F. Trotter, Thomas Williams, John Henderson, Jesse Speight | Succeeded by Joseph W. Chalmers |
| Preceded by Thomas Ewing | Chair of the Senate Public Lands Committee; 1836–1841 | Succeeded by Oliver H. Smith |
Political offices
| Preceded by George M. Bibb | United States Secretary of the Treasury; 1845–1849 | Succeeded by William M. Meredith |
| Preceded by John W. Geary | Governor of Kansas; 1857 | Succeeded by James W. Denver |
