= John Heritage Bryan =

US Representative from North Carolina (1798–1870)

Member of the U.S. House of Representatives from North Carolina's 4th district
- In office March 4, 1825 – March 3, 1829
- Preceded by: Richard D. Spaight Jr.
- Succeeded by: Jesse Speight

Personal details
- Born: November 4, 1798 New Bern, North Carolina, U.S.
- Died: May 19, 1870 (aged 71) Raleigh, North Carolina, U.S.
- Resting place: Historic Oakwood Cemetery
- Party: Anti-Jacksonian

John Heritage Bryan (November 4, 1798 – May 19, 1870) was a U.S. Representative from North Carolina.

Born in New Bern, North Carolina, Bryan studied under private teachers and attended New Bern Academy. He graduated from the University of North Carolina in 1815, where he was a member of the Philanthropic Society. He studied law. He was admitted to the bar in 1819 and commenced practice in New Bern, North Carolina. He served as member of the North Carolina State Senate in 1823 and 1824. Trustee of the University of North Carolina at Chapel Hill 1823–1868.

Bryan was elected as Jacksonian to the Nineteenth Congress and as an Adams candidate in the Twentieth Congress (March 4, 1825 – March 3, 1829). He was not a candidate for renomination in 1828. He resumed the practice of law in New Bern. He moved to Raleigh in 1839 and continued the practice of law. He died in Raleigh, North Carolina, May 19, 1870. He was interred in Oakwood Cemetery.

The Bryan House and Office at New Bern was listed on the National Register of Historic Places in 1972.

== Sources ==
- United States Congress. "John Heritage Bryan (id: B000988)". Biographical Directory of the United States Congress.

U.S. House of Representatives
Preceded by Richard D. Spaight Jr.	Member of the U.S. House of Representatives from North Carolina's 4th congressional district 1825–1829	Succeeded by Jesse Speight
