= Catherine Devereux Edmondston =

American diarist

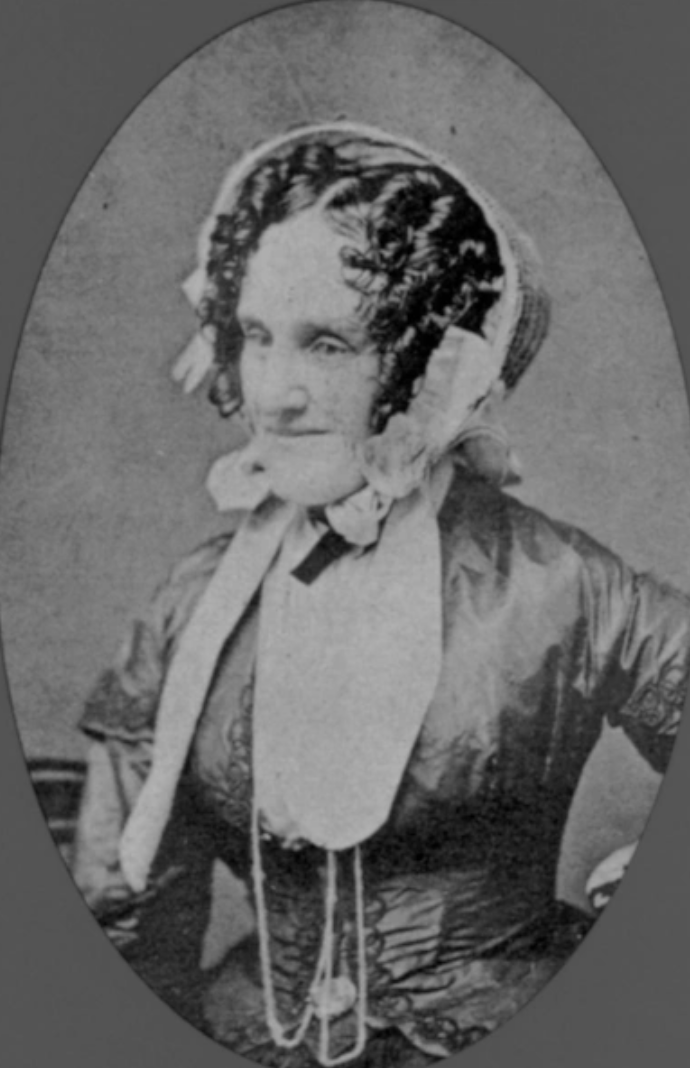
- Born: Catherine Ann Devereux; October 10, 1823; Halifax County, North Carolina, U.S.
- Died: January 3, 1875 (aged 51); Halifax County, North Carolina, U.S.
- Resting place: Trinity Church Cemetery
- Education: Belmont School
- Occupations: diarist, planter, slave owner
- Spouse: Patrick Mair Edmondston
- Relatives: Mary Bayard Clarke (sister)

Catherine Ann Devereux Edmondston (October 10, 1823 – January 3, 1875) was an American diarist, planter, and slave owner. She and her husband owned Looking Glass Plantation and Hascosea Plantation in Halifax County, North Carolina, which were given from her father as part of her dowry. They enslaved eighty-eight people on their plantations. Edmondston wrote extensively in her diary about her life during the American Civil War and on her plantation. She authored short essays supporting the Lost Cause of the Confederacy and penned Confederate patriotic poems.

== Early life and family ==
Edmondston was born Catherine Ann Devereux on October 10, 1823 in Halifax County, North Carolina. A member of the planter aristocracy, she was the daughter of Thomas Pollock Devereux and Catherine Ann Bayard Johnson Devereux. She was a sister of the writer Mary Bayard Devereux Clarke. She was a great-granddaughter of the theologian Jonathan Edwards and a great-great-great-granddaughter of Governor Thomas Pollock. Through her mother, she was a descendent of the minister and philosopher Samuel Johnson.

She grew up at Conneconara, her father's large plantation in Halifax County. She was tutored in literature, mathematics, science, and philosophy before attending Belmont, a Christian school for girls run by Margaret Mercer near Leesburg, Virginia.

== Adult life ==
=== Marriage ===
On February 19, 1846, she married Patrick Mair Edmondston, the son Charles and Mary Pratt Edmondston, wealthy planters from Charleston, South Carolina. Shortly after their wedding, they moved to Charleston. Her husband served on the executive committee, and as vice president, of the Scotland Neck Agricultural Society and as an aid to the governor of South Carolina.

In 1848, they moved back to Halifax County and rented a home, called Barrows, from her father. Her father offered them Looking Glass Plantation, which adjoined Conneconara Plantation, and the Hascosea plantation as the final payments of a $10,000 dowry he had promised.

In the 1850s, Edmondston's husband served as a county justice of the peace, served in the North Carolina Militia, and helped organize the Scotland Neck Mounted Riflemen, a volunteer cavalry company. By the 1860s, she and her husband enslaved eighty-eight people on their 1,894-acre estate.

=== Civil War ===
Edmondston and her husband were both ardent secessionists and supporters of the Confederacy. Her husband entered Confederate service during the American Civil War while she provided food and clothing to the troops.

Throughout the war, Edmonston wrote extensively in her diaries. She provided detailed accounts about life during the war and on her plantation. In her diaries, she referred to Union Army soldiers who raided southern homes as "thieves". She composed patriotic poems for the Confederacy and wrote scrutinizing comments about military and political leaders in both the Union and Confederacy. Even after the end of the war, Edmondston remained upset about the Confederacy's defeat, publishing a short essay in 1872 about her antagonism towards the North which was titled The Morte d'Arthur.

== Death ==
Edmondston died on January 3, 1875. A devout Episcopalian, she was buried in the cemetery at Trinity Episcopal Church in Scotland Neck, North Carolina.
