= Duncan Stephen Walker =

American army officer

- Born: November 11, 1841
- Died: June 3, 1912 (aged 70)
- Burial place: Arlington National Cemetery
- Military career
- Allegiance: United States
- Branch: Union Army
- Conflicts: American Civil War

Duncan Stephen Walker (November 11, 1841 – June 3, 1912) was a Union Army lieutenant colonel and assistant adjutant general during the American Civil War. He resigned his commission on May 12, 1865. In 1866, he was nominated and confirmed for appointment as a brevet brigadier general, to rank from March 13, 1865.

The grandson of Revolutionary War veteran and U.S. District Judge Jonathan Hoge Walker and son of U.S. Senator Robert John Walker and his wife Mary Blechynden Bache Walker, he was educated at Georgetown University, Lafayette College, and Princeton University. Initially commissioned as a captain of volunteers, Walker served as an assistant adjutant-general during the American Civil War, on the staffs of Major Gen. Nathaniel P. Banks and later Brig. Gen. William H. Emory and Major Gen. Winfield Scott Hancock.

On February 21, 1866, President Andrew Johnson nominated Walker for appointment to the grade of brevet brigadier general of volunteers, to rank from March 13, 1865, and the United States Senate confirmed the appointment on April 10, 1866.

He is buried at Arlington National Cemetery. He was the great-great-grandson of Benjamin Franklin.

== See also ==
- List of American Civil War brevet generals (Union)
