= John Black (Mississippi politician) =

American politician

United States Senator from Mississippi
- In office November 12, 1832 – March 3, 1833 – November 22, 1833 – January 22, 1838
- Preceded by: Powhatan Ellis
- Succeeded by: James F. Trotter

Personal details
- Born: August 11, 1800 Massachusetts, U.S.
- Died: August 29, 1854 (aged 54) Winchester, Virginia, U.S.
- Party: Whig

John Black (August 11, 1800 – August 29, 1854) was a politician from the U.S. state of Mississippi, most notably serving in the United States Senate as a Whig from 1832 to 1838.

== Biography ==
Black was born in Massachusetts, and became a teacher. He then moved to Louisiana, where he practiced law. After moving to Mississippi, he was elected a judge in 1826, eventually being elected to the Mississippi Supreme Court. In 1832, Governor Charles Lynch appointed him as a Jacksonian, the forerunner of the modern Democratic Party, to fill the United States Senate vacancy left by Powhatan Ellis. He ran for the seat in his own right as an anti-Jacksonian (later Whig) and served from November 22, 1833 to January 22, 1838, when he resigned.

During his time in office, he served as the chairman of the U.S. Senate Committee on Private Lands. After leaving the Senate, he moved to Winchester, Virginia, where he resumed practicing law until his death.

Like many southern United States politicians of his day, Black was a slave owner.

== See also ==
- List of justices of the Supreme Court of Mississippi

U.S. Senate
Preceded by Powhatan Ellis	U.S. senator (Class 1) from Mississippi; November 12, 1832 – March 3, 1833 (Legislature failed to elect.); November 22, 1833 – January 22, 1838; Served alongside: George Poindexter, Robert J. Walker	Succeeded by James F. Trotter
Political offices
Preceded by Isaac Caldwell	Justice of the Supreme Court of Mississippi; 1826–1832	Succeeded by Eli Huston
