= 1845 Mississippi gubernatorial election =

- November 3, 1845
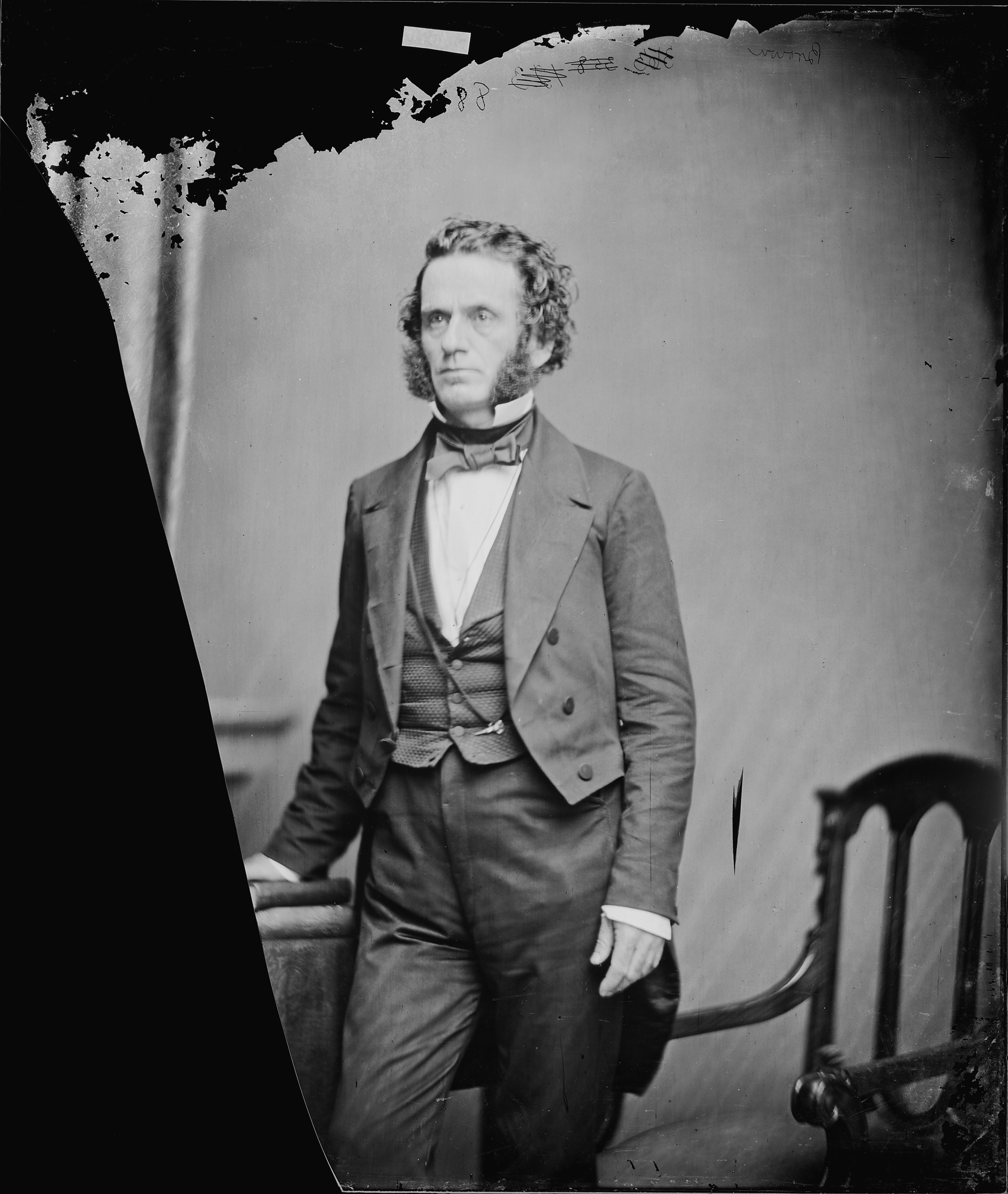

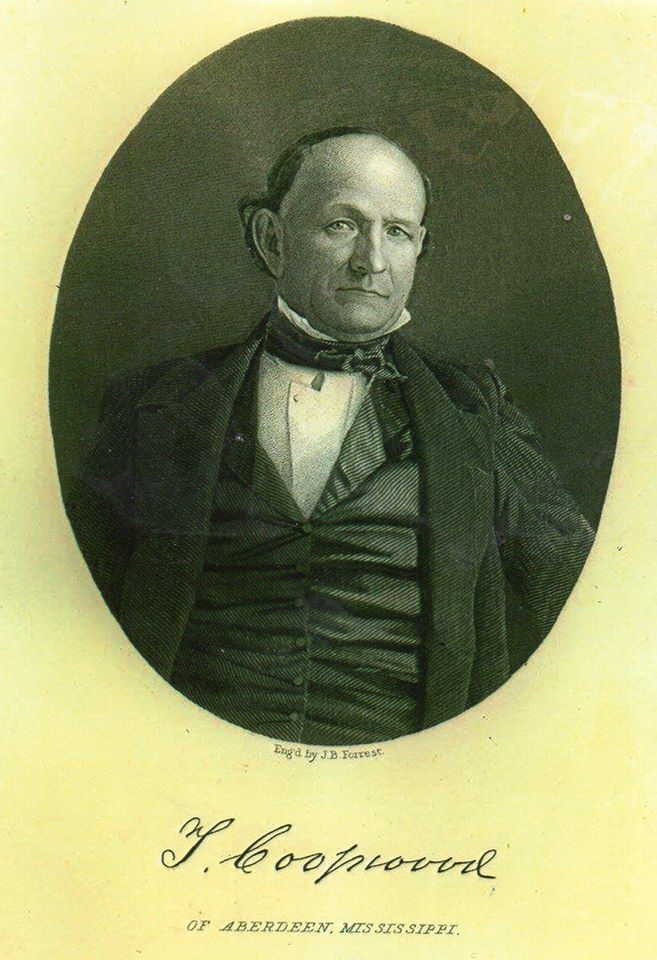
Nominee	Albert G. Brown	Thomas B. Coopwood
Party	Democratic	Whig
Popular vote	28,310	12,852
Percentage	66.07%	30.00%
- County results Brown: 50–60% 60–70% 70–80% 80–90% 90–100% Coopwood: 50–60% 60–70%
Governor before election
Albert G. Brown
Democratic
Elected Governor
Albert G. Brown
Democratic

The 1845 Mississippi gubernatorial election was held on November 3, 1845, to elect the governor of Mississippi. Albert G. Brown, a Democrat won against Whig Thomas Coopwood and candidate Issac N. Davis.

== Results ==
Mississippi gubernatorial election, 1845
Party	Candidate	Votes	%
Democratic	Albert G. Brown (incumbent)	28,310	66.07%
Whig	Thomas B. Coopwood	12,852	30.00%
	Issac N. Davis	1,683	3.93%
Total votes		42,845	100.00
Democratic hold			
