= Toaping Castle =

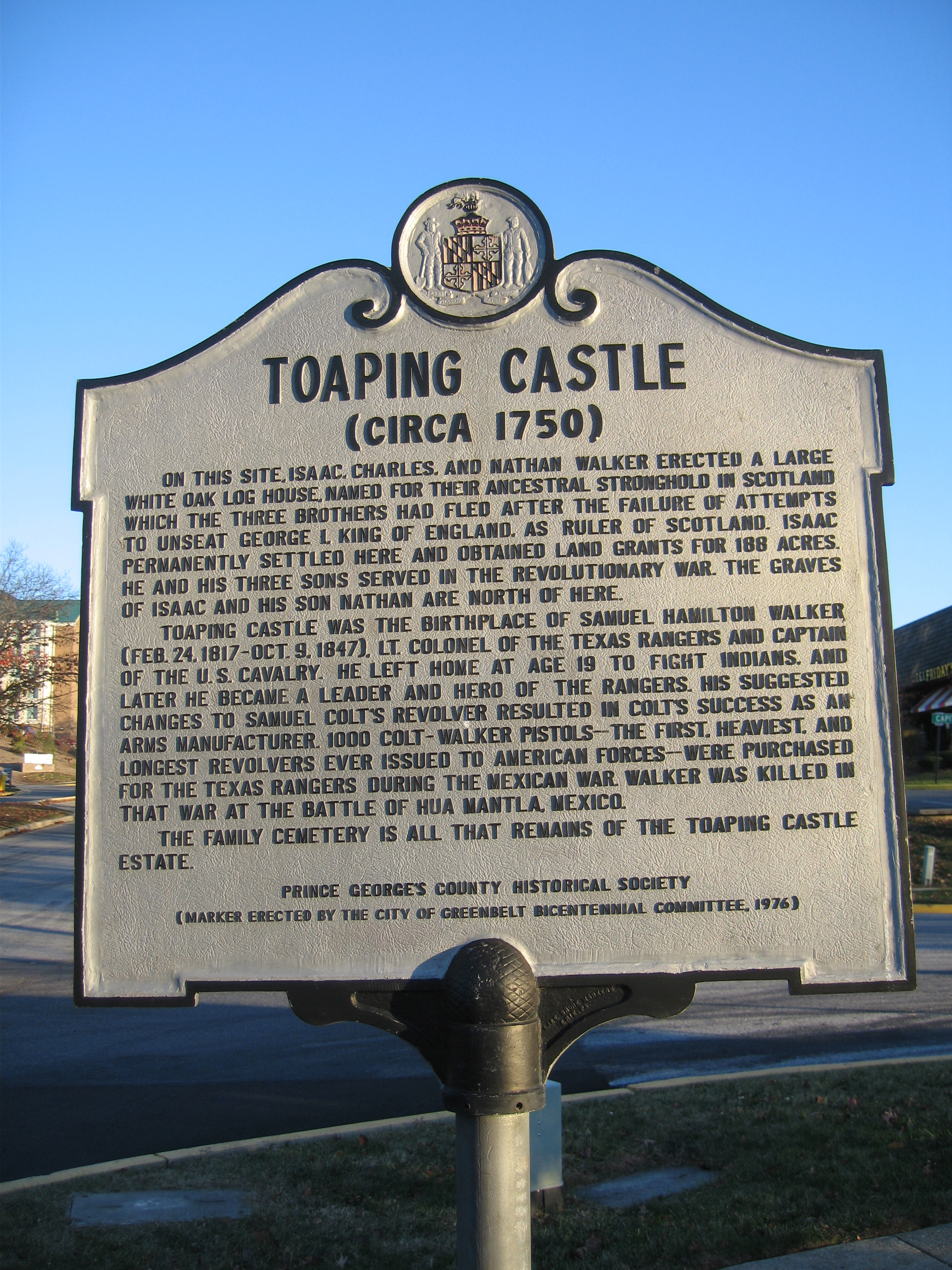
- Interactive map of the Toaping Castle area

General information
- Type: White Oak Log House
- Location: Walker Drive and Capital Drive; Greenbelt, Maryland; United States
- Coordinates: 38°59′48″N 76°53′42″W
- Construction started: Circa 1750

The Toaping Castle was a house in present-day Greenbelt, Maryland, built c. 1750. The house sat on a 188-acre (0.76 km^{2}) land grant in an area that eventually became Greenbelt. Samuel Hamilton Walker was born at Toaping Castle in 1817 and later served as a Texas Ranger and U.S. Army officer who died in the Mexican–American War.

The historical marker, located in front of a TGI Friday's restaurant at the corner of Greenbelt Road and Walker Drive, states that only the family cemetery remains of Toaping Castle. The cemetery is located at the end of Walker Drive in the woods behind a large parking structure, and contains the graves of Isaac and Nathan Walker.
