= James F. Trotter =

American judge

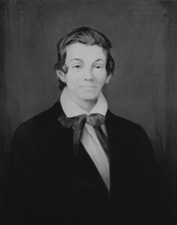

United States Senator from Mississippi
- In office January 22, 1838 – July 10, 1838
- Appointed by: Alexander McNutt
- Preceded by: John Black
- Succeeded by: Thomas H. Williams

Member of the Mississippi Senate
- In office 1829-1833

Member of the Mississippi House of Representatives
- In office 1827-1829

Personal details
- Born: November 5, 1802 Brunswick County, Virginia, US
- Died: March 9, 1866 (aged 63) Holly Springs, Mississippi, US
- Party: Democratic
- Spouse: Susan Trotter
- Profession: Politician, Lawyer, Judge, Teacher

James Fisher Trotter (November 5, 1802 – March 9, 1866) was a United States senator from Mississippi.

== Early life ==
James Fisher Trotter was born on November 5, 1802, in Brunswick County, Virginia. He moved to eastern Tennessee, attended private schools, and studied law. He was admitted to the bar in 1820.

== Career ==
Trotter commenced practice in Hamilton, Mississippi, in 1823. He owned slaves. From 1827 to 1829 he was a member of the Mississippi House of Representatives and a member of the Mississippi Senate from 1829 to 1833. In 1833 he was judge of the circuit court of Mississippi; he was later appointed as a Democrat to the U.S. Senate to fill the vacancy caused by the resignation of John Black and served from January 22 to July 10, 1838, when he resigned.

From 1839 to 1842, Trotter was judge of the Mississippi Supreme Court, having been appointed to fill the vacancy caused by the resignation of Justice Daniel W. Wright, and then elected in 1839 to a six-year term. He resigned in 1842 and moved to Holly Springs, where he resumed the practice of law. He was vice chancellor of the northern district of Mississippi from 1855 to 1857, and was professor of law at the University of Mississippi from 1860 to 1862. He was appointed circuit judge in 1866 and served until his death later that year.

== Death ==
Trotter died on March 9, 1866, in Holly Springs, Mississippi. He was buried at the Hillcrest Cemetery.

U.S. Senate
Preceded by John Black	U.S. senator (Class 1) from Mississippi; January 22, 1838 – July 10, 1838; Served alongside: Robert J. Walker	Succeeded by Thomas H. Williams
