= Bryan House and Office =

Historic house in North Carolina, United States

- U.S. National Register of Historic Places
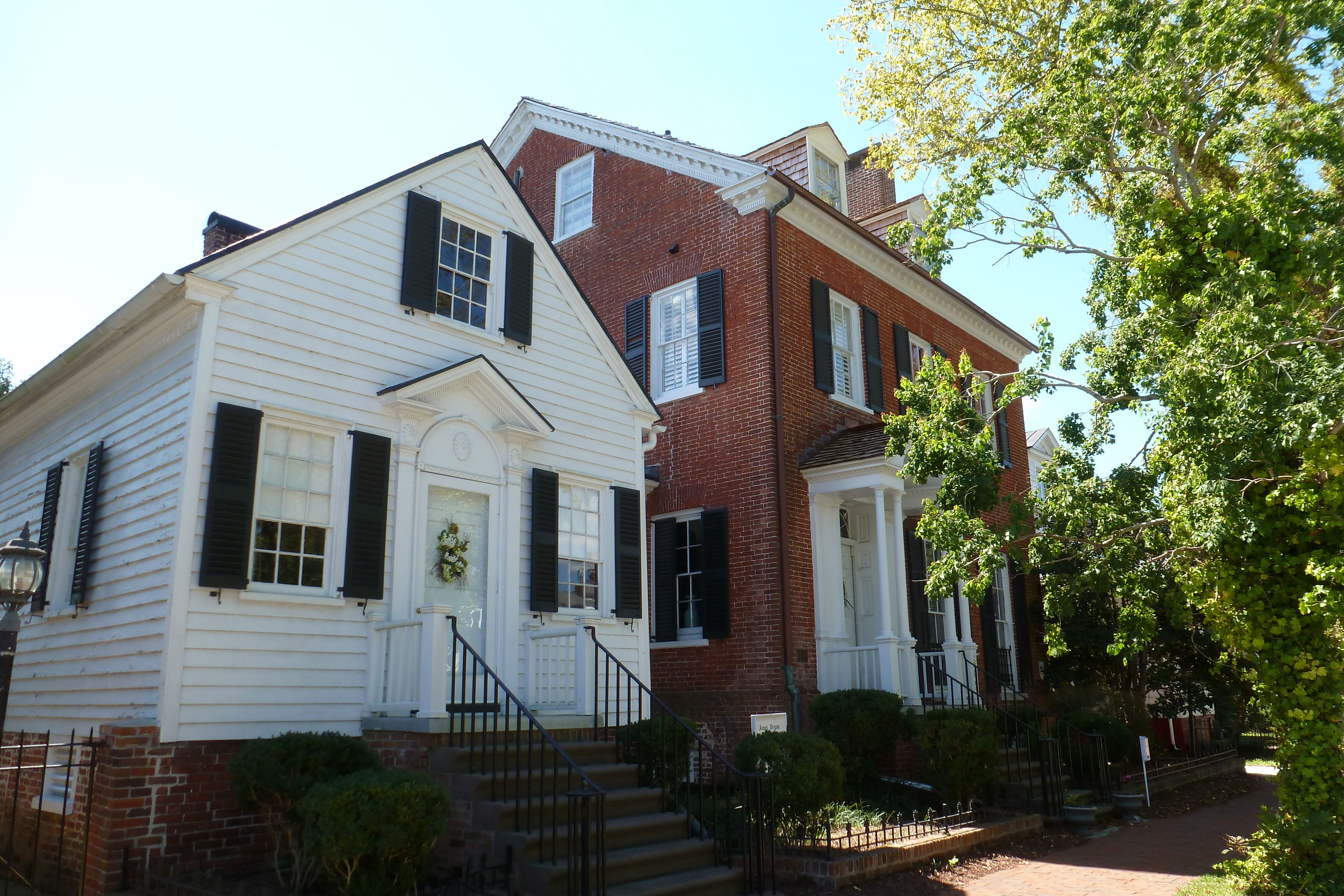
- Bryan House and Office, September 2012

- Location within North Carolina Location within the United States
- Location: 603-605 Pollock St., New Bern, North Carolina
- Coordinates: 35°6′24″N 77°2′38″W
- Area: 0.3 acres (0.12 ha)
- Built: 1804-1806
- Built by: Stevenson, Martin
- Architectural style: Federal
- NRHP reference No.: 72000935
- Added to NRHP: March 24, 1972

Bryan House and Office is a historic home and office building located at New Bern, Craven County, North Carolina. It was built between 1804 and 1806 on the grounds of the original Tryon Palace. It is a 2 1/2-story, three-bay, side-hall plan Federal style brick dwelling. The house was modernized and a rear wing added in 1840. East of the home is a one-story, frame office building on a brick foundation. It was the home of Congressman John Heritage Bryan (1798–1870).

It was listed on the National Register of Historic Places in 1972.
