= 1843 Mississippi gubernatorial election =

- November 6, 1843
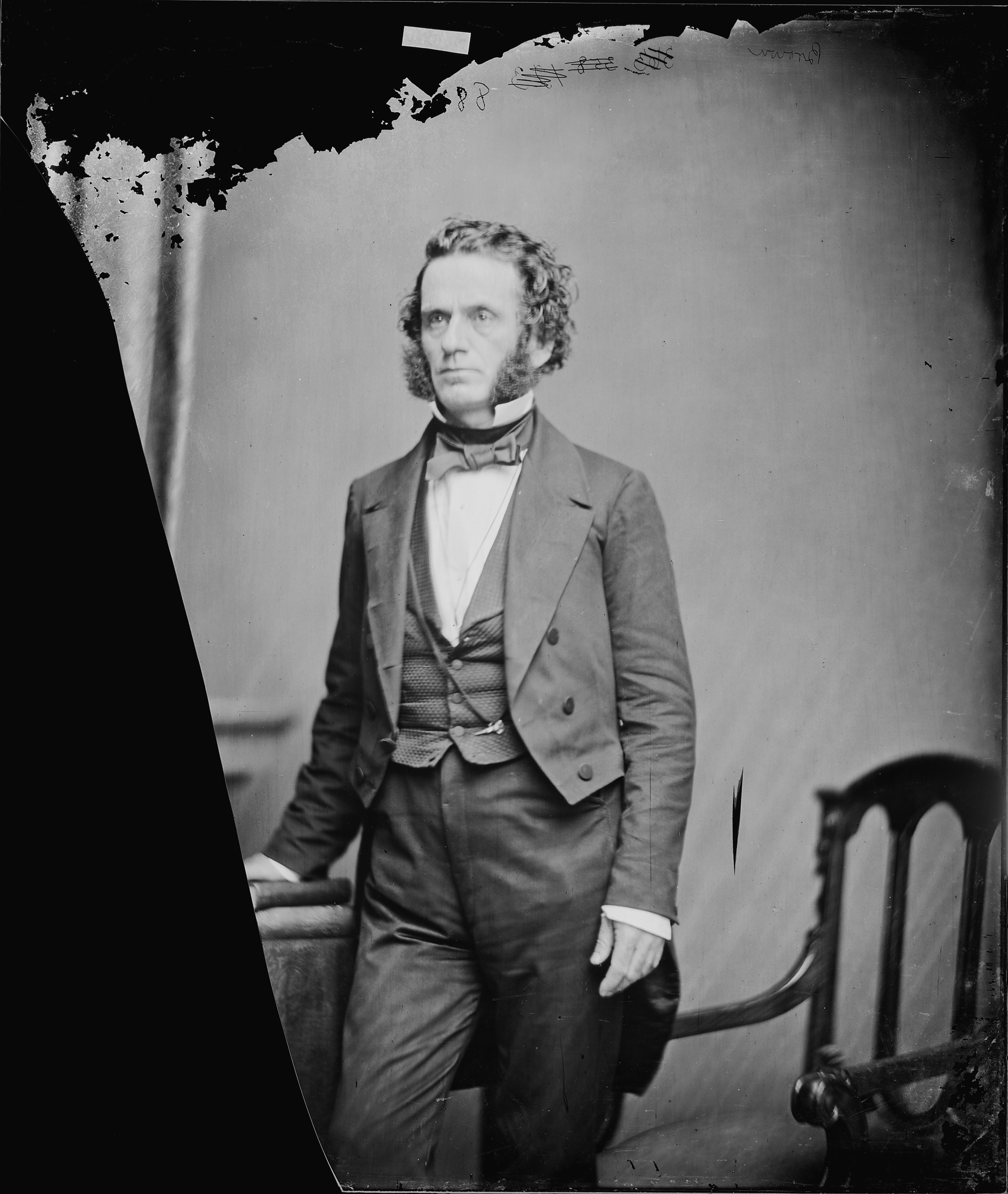

Nominee	Albert G. Brown	George R. Clayton
Party	Democratic	Whig
Popular vote	21,035	17,322
Percentage	52.98%	43.63%
County results
Brown
40–50%
50–60%
60–70%
70–80%
80–90%
90–100%
Clayton
40–50%
50–60%
60–70%
No returns
Governor before election
Tilghman Tucker
Democratic
Elected Governor
Albert G. Brown
Democratic

The 1843 Mississippi gubernatorial election was held on November 6, 1843, to elect the governor of Mississippi. Albert G. Brown, an anti-bond Democrat won against Whig George R. Clayton and "bond-paying Democrat" and former U.S. Senator Thomas Hickman Williams.

== General election ==
The Union Bank bonds controversy persisted as a prominent economic and political issue in Mississippi during the 1840s, maintaining its divisive influence. In the 1843 election, the Democrats, still divided over the bond question, opted not to nominate Governor Tilghman M. Tucker for reelection and instead chose Albert G. Brown. The primary focus of the campaign centered on the repudiation of the Union Bank bonds. Brown's opponents highlighted his past support for the Union Bank, pointing to his votes in the legislature for its charter and a bill in 1839 compelling Governor McNutt to issue the full amount of bonds. In response, Democrats argued that new insights deemed the issuance of Union Bank bonds unconstitutional. The anti-bond Democrats rallied behind Brown, who emerged victorious in the election by defeating the Whig candidate, George R. Clayton, and former U.S. Senator Thomas Hickman Williams, an independent bond-paying Democrat.

== Results ==
Mississippi gubernatorial election, 1843
Party	Candidate	Votes	%
Democratic	Albert G. Brown	21,035	52.98%
Whig	George R. Clayton	17,322	43.63%
Democratic	Thomas Hickman Williams	1,343	3.38%
Total votes		39,700	100.00
Democratic hold			
