= Daniel W. Wright =

American judge (1797–1844)

Daniel W. Wright (June 7, 1797 – November 22, 1844) was a justice of the Supreme Court of Mississippi from 1832 to 1838.

== Biography ==
According to his headstone at Pontotoc City Cemetery, Wright was born in Laurens County, South Carolina.

In 1829 Wright was involved in developing a location called Hanan's Bluff on the Yazoo River into a settlement called Manchester, near Madison and Yazoo Counties. He was nominated in 1834 to run for a seat in the U.S. House, but "declining a poll" was not a Jacksonian Democratic candidate after all. James F. Trotter "became the competitor and rival of Daniel W. Wright, which emulation continued as long as both remained at the bar".

Wright was enumerated in the Mississippi state census of 1837 as a resident of Lowdnes County. Trotter resigned from the bench effective December 1, 1838. In 1841, he was offering cotton seed for sale, imported from Mexico, including the Gulph cultivar and a strain he claimed would mature 10 to 15 days earlier than existing strains. Wright died at his home near Pontotoc, Mississippi in 1844.

According to The Bench and Bar of Mississippi (1881):

Daniel W. Wright was born in the eastern portion of the State of Tennessee, and was reared near Huntsville, Alabama, whither his father's family had removed. Here he prepared himself for the bar and began the practice of law, but in 1822–3 he emigrated to Mississippi and settled in Monroe County, at a place called Hamilton. Here he rose to eminence in his profession, and at the first election under the Revised Constitution, in 1833, was chosen one of the judges of the High Court of Errors and Appeals, for the term of six years. This office he held until 1838, when he resigned, and having lost his wife about this time he retired also from the bar, and made his residence with his daughter, in the town of Pontotoc, where he died a year or two afterwards. ... He never wrote an opinion during the five years he occupied a seat upon the high bench, which was not at all in conformity with his early vigorous career at the bar, and can be accounted for only upon the ground of an unfortunate conviviality to which he became addicted, and which impaired his energies.

Writing in 1881, Reuben Davis recalled of him, "Daniel W. Wright was very kind to us both, and I have to record my gratitude to him for much friendly notice and encouragement. He was profoundly read as a lawyer and really a brilliant speaker. I passed many hours at his house, which was made charming by the gentleness of his wife."

Political offices
Preceded by Newly established seat	Justice of the Supreme Court of Mississippi; 1832–1838	Succeeded by James F. Trotter
