= Jesse Speight =

American politician

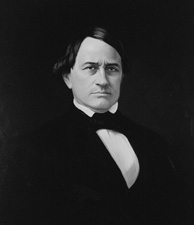

United States Senator from Mississippi
- In office March 4, 1845 – May 1, 1847
- Preceded by: John Henderson
- Succeeded by: Jefferson Davis

Member of the Mississippi Senate
- In office 1841–1844

Member of the U.S. House of Representatives from North Carolina's 4th district
- In office March 4, 1829 – March 3, 1837
- Preceded by: John H. Bryan
- Succeeded by: Charles B. Shepard

Member of the North Carolina Senate
- In office 1823–1827

Member of the North Carolina House of Commons
- In office 1820

Personal details
- Born: September 22, 1795 Greene County, North Carolina
- Died: May 1, 1847 (aged 51) Columbus, Mississippi
- Party: Democratic
- Profession: Politician

Jesse Speight (September 22, 1795 – May 1, 1847) was a North Carolina and Mississippi politician in the nineteenth century.

Born in Greene County, North Carolina, Speight attended country schools as a child. He was a member of the North Carolina House of Commons in 1820, serving as Speaker of the House, and was a member of the North Carolina Senate from 1823 to 1827. He was elected to the United States House of Representatives in 1828, serving from 1829 to 1837, not being a candidate for renomination in 1836.

Speight moved to Plymouth, Mississippi and was a member of the Mississippi Senate from 1841 to 1844, serving as its president from 1842 to 1843. He was elected a Democrat to the United States Senate in 1844, serving from 1845 until his death, where he was chairman of the Committee on Engrossed Bills and Audit and Control the Contingent Expenses of the Senate. Speight died in Columbus, Mississippi on May 1, 1847, and was interred in Friendship Cemetery in Columbus.

His replacement as Senator was Jefferson Davis, the future President of the Confederate States of America.

== See also ==
- List of members of the United States Congress who died in office (1790–1899)

U.S. House of Representatives
Preceded by John H. Bryan	Member of the U.S. House of Representatives from North Carolina's 4th congressional district March 4, 1829 – March 4, 1837	Succeeded by Charles B. Shepard
U.S. Senate
Preceded by John Henderson	U.S. senator (Class 1) from Mississippi; March 4, 1845 – May 1, 1847; Served alongside: Robert J. Walker, Joseph W. Chalmers and Henry S. Foote	Succeeded by Jefferson Davis
