= Tilghman Tucker =

American politician

Tilghman Mayfield Tucker
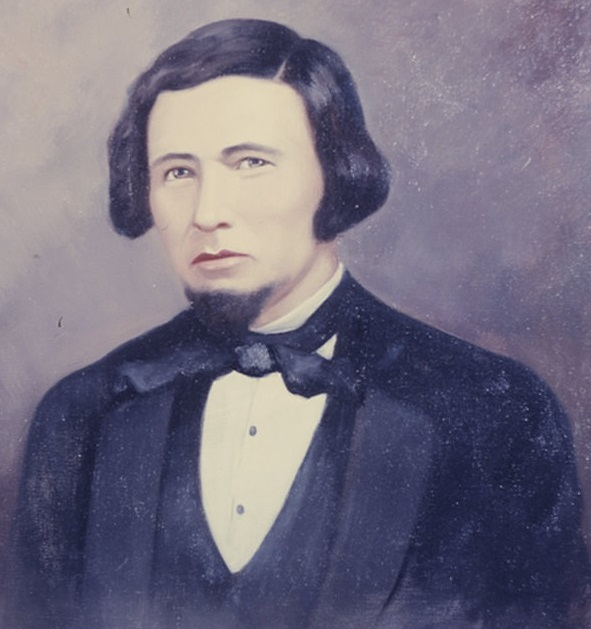

13th Governor of Mississippi
- In office January 10, 1842 – January 10, 1844
- Preceded by: Alexander G. McNutt
- Succeeded by: Albert G. Brown

Member of the U.S. House of Representatives from Mississippi's at-large congressional district
- In office March 4, 1843 – March 4, 1845
- Preceded by: Seat established
- Succeeded by: Jefferson Davis

Member of the Mississippi House of Representatives
- In office 1831–1835

Member of the Mississippi State Senate
- In office 1838–1841

Personal details
- Born: February 5, 1802 Lime Stone Springs, North Carolina, U.S.
- Died: April 3, 1859 (aged 57) Bexar, Alabama, U.S.

Tilghman Mayfield Tucker (February 5, 1802 – April 3, 1859) was Governor of Mississippi from 1842 to 1844. He was a Democrat.

== Early life ==
Tucker was born in North Carolina near Lime Stone Springs, and lived in Alabama for a time before moving to Mississippi. He left his career of blacksmithing in Wise Gap, Mississippi and studied law under Judge Daniel W. Wright in Hamilton, Mississippi. office in Columbus, Mississippi.

== Career ==
Tucker was elected in 1831 to the Mississippi House of Representatives as a Democrat and was the first representative from Lowndes County, serving until 1835. From 1838 to 1841 he served in the state senate.

In 1837 he had 3 male slaves and 4 female slaves according to the state census.

By 1841, the aftermath of the Panic of 1837 had caused a division among Mississippi Democrats. The issue was whether the state would honor the bonds of the Planters Bank and Union Bank, both of which had failed in the panic. Some Democrats stated that they would support the Whig gubernatorial candidate David Shattuck who wanted the redemption of the bonds in the 1841 Mississippi gubernatorial election. Though Tucker was at first reluctant to accept the Democratic nomination in the election, he accepted and won with a narrow victory.

During Tucker's two-year term (1842–1844), the Democratic Party remained divided over the bond issue. Also, Tucker's political opponents accused him of not acting fast enough in matter of state treasurer Richard S. Graves, who had embezzled $44,000 of state funding and fled to Canada.

Tucker was not nominated for reelection in the 1843 Mississippi gubernatorial election, but he did win one term in the U.S. House of Representatives from March 4, 1843, to March 3, 1845. He then retired from public life and moved to his Louisiana plantation home named Cottonwood. While visiting his father near Bexar in Marion County, Alabama, Tucker died on April 3, 1859.

Party political offices
Preceded by Alexander McNutt	Democratic nominee for Governor of Mississippi; 1841	Succeeded by Albert G. Brown
Political offices
Preceded by Alexander G. McNutt	Governor of Mississippi; 1842–1844	Succeeded by Albert G. Brown
U.S. House of Representatives
Preceded by Seat established	Member of the U.S. House of Representatives from Mississippi's at-large congressional district 1843 – 1845	Succeeded by Jefferson Davis
