= Samuel Hamilton Walker =

American Texas Ranger and military officer (1817–1847)

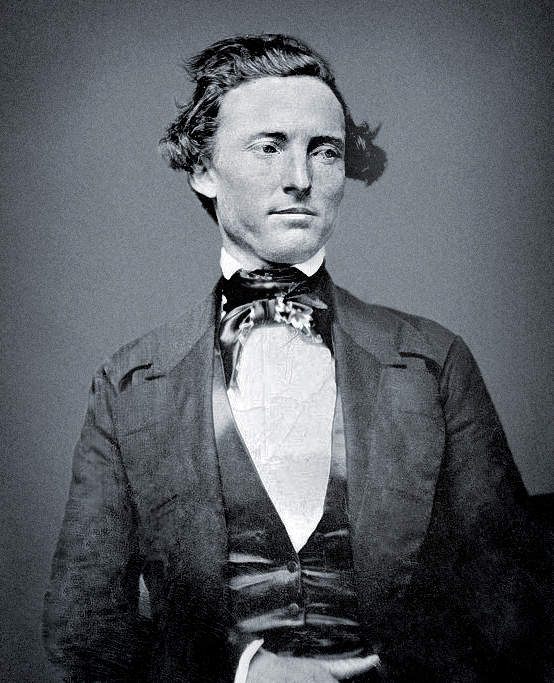
- Samuel Hamilton Walker, c. 1846
- Born: February 24, 1817; Toaping Castle, Maryland, U.S.
- Died: October 9, 1847 (aged 30); Huamantla, Tlaxcala, Mexico
- Cause of death: Killed in action
- Occupations: Army Captain, Texas Ranger

Samuel Hamilton Walker (February 24, 1817 – October 9, 1847) was an American army officer. He served as a Texas Ranger captain and officer of the Republic of Texas and the United States armies. Walker served in several armed conflicts, including the American Indian Wars and the Mexican–American War.

== Biography ==
Samuel Hamilton Walker was born on February 24, 1817, at Toaping Castle, Maryland, to Nathan and Elizabeth (Thomas) Walker, and was the fifth of seven children. He owned a slave named David.

=== Military career ===
Walker enlisted in the Washington City Volunteers for the Creek Indian Campaign in Alabama in 1836. The following year he mustered out. He managed a hotel in Iola, Florida from 1837 through 1840. He arrived in Galveston, Texas in 1842 and served under Captain Jesse Billingsley against a Mexican invasion led by General Adrian Woll. Walker was captured on December 26, 1842, and marched to Mexico City as a prisoner of war. He survived what became known as the Black Bean Episode and was held prisoner for two years before he escaped to Louisiana and returned to Texas.

He joined the Texas Rangers in 1844 under the command of Captain Jack Hays. Promoted to captain, he led a Ranger company during the Mexican–American War, serving with General Zachary Taylor and General Winfield Scott's armies.

== Walker Colt revolver ==
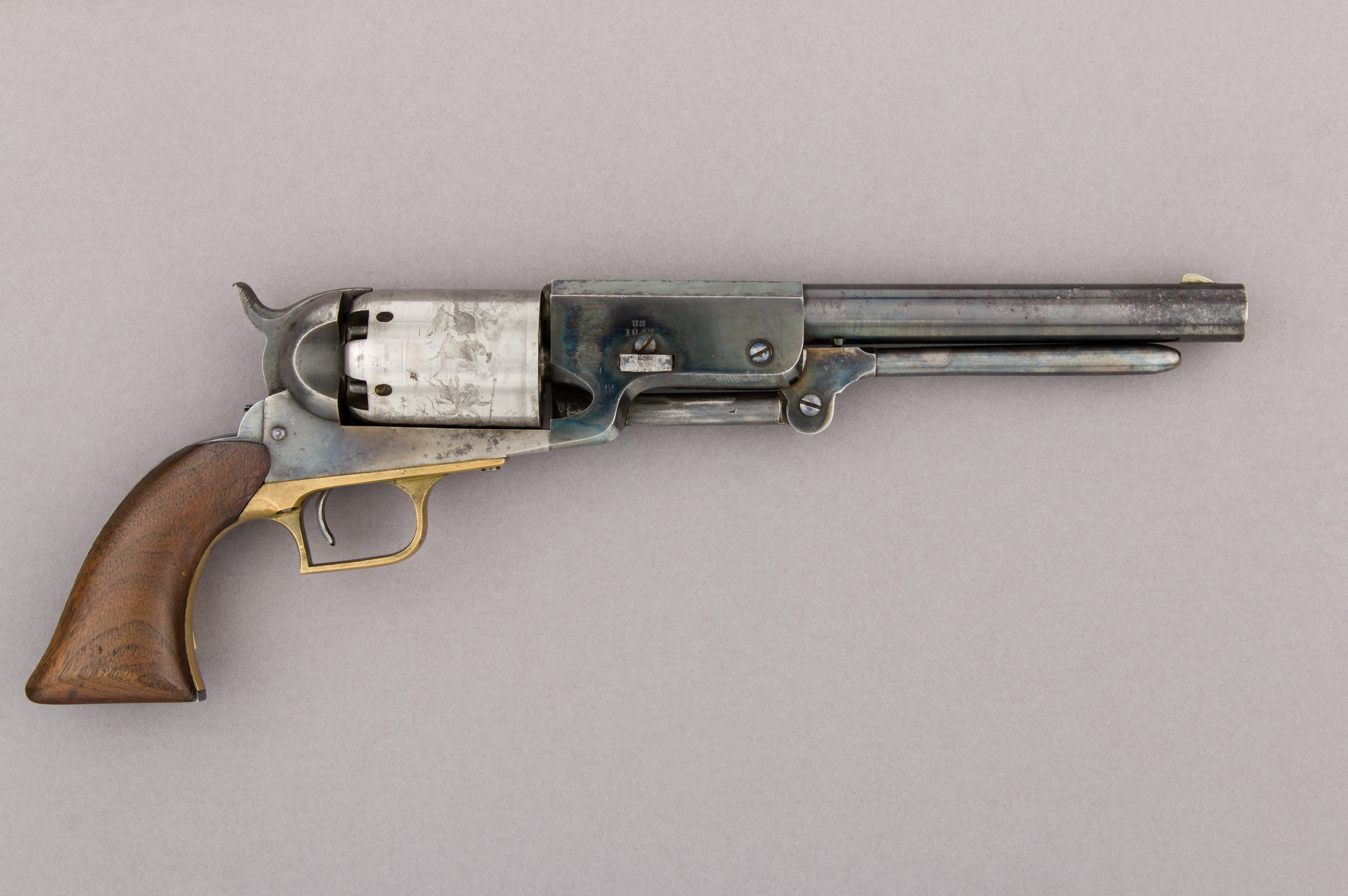
A Walker Colt revolver

Walker is best known as the co-inventor of the Walker Colt revolver, along with arms manufacturer Samuel Colt. Walker is said to have self-funded a trip to New York City to meet with Colt and proposed to him the concept of a weapon based on the then-popular five-shot Colt Paterson revolver, with many enhancements such as adding a sixth round, being powerful enough to kill either a man or a horse with a single shot and quicker to reload.

Colt's firearms company was no longer in business, but the large order allowed Colt to establish a new company. He hired Eli Whitney Junior, already in the arms business, to make his new revolvers. Colt asked Samuel Walker, who happened to be temporarily stationed in Washington, to help him with the design.

Colt used his prototype and Walker's improvements to create a new design. Whitney produced the first thousand-piece order, known as the Colt Walker. The company then received an order for an additional one thousand more. Colt's share of the profits was $10.

By 1847, the new revolver was available. The United States Army's mounted rifle companies were issued them, and they proved extremely effective.

== Death ==
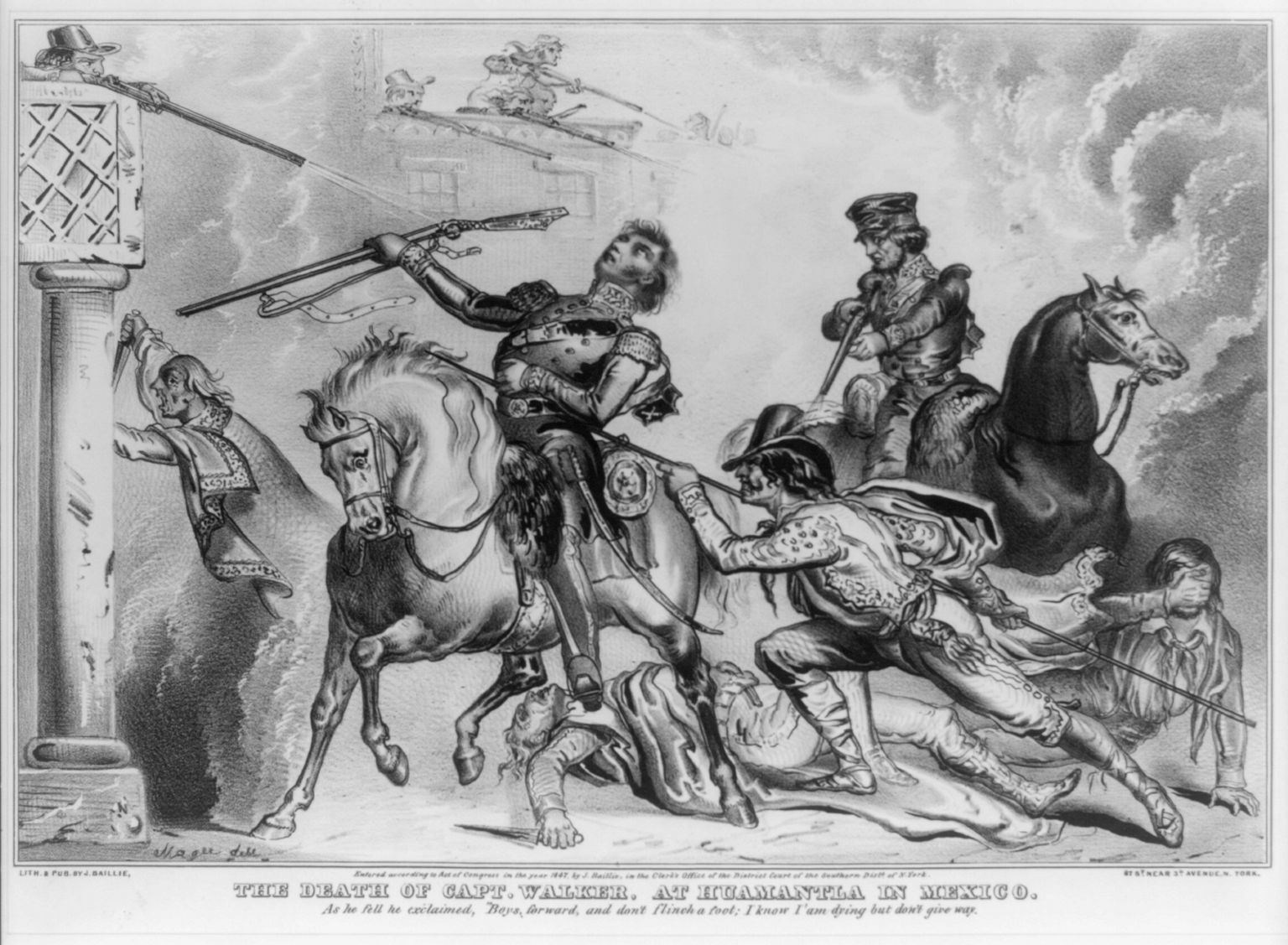
The death of Captain Walker

On October 9, 1847, Walker was killed by a rifle bullet while leading a cavalry charge at the Battle of Huamantla. Walker had received a pair of his Walker pistols (serial numbers 1009 and 1010) before his death. The following year, his remains were moved to San Antonio. On April 21, 1856, as part of the 20th anniversary of the Battle of San Jacinto, Walker was reburied in the Odd Fellows' Cemetery at San Antonio, along with Captain Robert Gillespie, a fellow veteran who was killed in action during the Mexican-American War.

Walker County, Texas, was renamed for him after its original namesake, Robert J. Walker (no relation), sided with the Union during the Civil War.

== See also ==
- History of the Texas Ranger Division
