= John Henderson (Mississippi politician) =

American politician

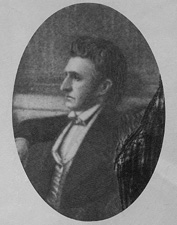

United States Senator from Mississippi
- In office March 4, 1839 – March 3, 1845
- Preceded by: Thomas H. Williams
- Succeeded by: Jesse Speight

Member of the Mississippi Senate
- In office 1835-1836

Personal details
- Born: February 28, 1797 Cumberland County, New Jersey, US
- Died: September 15, 1857 (aged 60) Pass Christian, Mississippi, US
- Party: Whig
- Profession: Politician, Lawyer, Flatboatman

Military service
- Branch/service: Mississippi Militia
- Rank: Brigadier General

John Henderson (February 28, 1797 – September 15, 1857) was a lawyer and U.S. Senator from Mississippi.

Born in Cumberland County, New Jersey, Henderson worked as a flatboatman on the Mississippi River and studied law. He moved to Mississippi and was admitted to the bar, commencing practice in Woodville, Mississippi. He served as a brigadier general in the Mississippi Militia and was a member of the Mississippi Senate from 1835 to 1836. In 1838, Henderson was elected a Whig to the United States Senate, serving one full term, 1839 to 1845. There, he served as chairman of the Committee on Engrossed Bills in the 26th Congress, of the Post Office and Post Roads in the 27th Congress and of the Committee on Private Land Claims in the 27th Congress and 28th Congresses. Afterwards, Henderson resumed practicing law in New Orleans, Louisiana.

In 1851, he was tried in the United States District Court in New Orleans for violation of the neutrality laws of 1817 for complicity in expeditions conducted by Venezuelan filibuster Narciso Lopez to liberate Cuba from Spanish rule, however was acquitted. A further attempt at filibustering ended in disaster when Lopez's 1851 invasion force was captured and many of them executed.

Henderson retired from public life and died in Pass Christian, Mississippi on September 15, 1857. He was interred in Live Oak Cemetery in Pass Christian.

U.S. Senate
Preceded by Thomas H. Williams	U.S. senator (Class 1) from Mississippi; March 4, 1839 – March 3, 1845; Served alongside: Robert J. Walker	Succeeded by Jesse Speight
