= San Antonio and Mexican Gulf Railroad =

Overview
- Headquarters: San Antonio, Texas
- Locale: San Antonio, Texas–Victoria, Texas
- Dates of operation: 1850–1870

Technical
- Track gauge: 4 ft 8 1/2 in (1,435 mm) standard gauge
- Previous gauge: 5 ft 6 in (1,676 mm)

The San Antonio and Mexican Gulf Railroad (SA&MG) was a railroad in Texas, set up in 1850 to connect the city of San Antonio to the Gulf of Mexico. The railroad survived the Civil War and merged with the Indianola Railroad into the Gulf, Western Texas and Pacific Railway in 1871.

== History of the road ==
The SA&MG was chartered on September 5, 1850, with plans to connect Lavaca (later renamed to Port Lavaca) to San Antonio. Trackwork began in 1856, and a line was completed to Victoria in April, 1861, when the Civil War broke out. Among the founders of the railroad were German-born railroad engineer Gustav Schleicher and Joseph E. Johnston who was an army officer stationed in San Antonio, who would later be a General in the Confederate army.

To facilitate the construction of a railroad from the Gulf to San Antonio, the SA&MG received 735,938 acres (2,978.24 km^{2}) of land from the State.

=== During the Civil War ===
Confederate General John B. Magruder ordered the destruction of the San Antonio and Mexican Gulf to prevent its falling into the hands of enemy forces. The railroad was rebuilt by the United States government in 1865-66.

== End of the road ==
The San Antonio and Mexican Gulf never did connect to the Gulf coast, stopping short in Victoria. On August 4, 1870, the Texas legislature authorized the consolidation of two rail lines, the Indianola Railroad Company and the San Antonio and Mexican Gulf Railroad Company, into a new corporation to be called the Gulf, Western Texas and Pacific Railway.
