= Charles Biddle Shepard =

American politician

Charles B. Shepard

Member of the U.S. House of Representatives from North Carolina's 4th district
- In office March 4, 1837 – March 3, 1841
- Preceded by: Jesse Speight
- Succeeded by: William H. Washington

Personal details
- Born: December 5, 1808 New Bern, North Carolina, U.S.
- Died: October 25, 1843 (aged 34) New Bern, North Carolina, U.S.
- Resting place: Cedar Grove Cemetery
- Party: Whig (1837-1389) Democratic (1839-1841)

Charles Biddle Shepard (December 5, 1808 – October 25, 1843) was a Congressional Representative from North Carolina; born in New Bern, North Carolina, December 5, 1808; attended private schools of his native city and graduated from the University of North Carolina at Chapel Hill in 1827. He then studied law. He was admitted to the bar in 1828 and commenced practice in New Bern, North Carolina. He was elected to the State house of representatives to fill out the unexpired term of Jesse Speight and served in 1831 and 1832. He was elected as a Whig to the Twenty-fifth Congress and reelected as a Democrat to the Twenty-sixth Congress (March 4, 1837 – March 3, 1841); resumed the practice of his profession. He died in New Bern, North Carolina on October 25, 1843.

== See also ==
- Twenty-fifth United States Congress
- Twenty-sixth United States Congress

U.S. House of Representatives
Preceded by Jesse Speight	Member of the U.S. House of Representatives from North Carolina's 4th congressional district 1837–1841	Succeeded by William H. Washington
