= Mary Bayard Devereux Clarke =

American poet

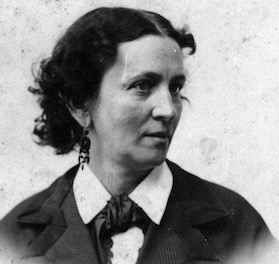
- Photo of Mary Bayard Clarke from the late 1860s
- Born: Mary Bayard Devereux; May 13, 1827; Raleigh, North Carolina, U.S.
- Died: March 30, 1886 (aged 58); New Bern, North Carolina, U.S.
- Other names: Tenella; Betsey Bittersweet
- Occupations: Poet, writer, translator, editor
- Notable work: Carolina Carols: A Collection of North Carolina Poetry (also known as "Wood Notes"), 1854
- Spouse: William J. Clarke
- Children: 4
- Relatives: Catherine Devereux Edmondston (sister)

Mary Bayard Devereux Clarke (née Devereux; May 13, 1827 – March 30, 1886) was a writer, poet, and editor who resided in North Carolina. Described posthumously by the Raleigh News and Observer as "one of its most gifted daughters", She set out to demonstrate the literary talent of her state while also learning from other cultures and styles of writing. Born and raised in Raleigh, Clarke began her work by compiling an anthology of North Carolina poetry, Wood Notes, before writing her own poetry which appeared in numerous magazines, newspapers, and journals in the United States and abroad.

== Early life and family ==
Mary Bayard Devereux was born on May 13, 1827, in Raleigh, North Carolina to Thomas Pollock Devereux and Catherine Anne (née Johnson) Devereux. Clarke came from a prominent, wealthy family. Her third great-grandfather, Thomas Pollock served as governor and acquired large sums of land spanning the entire eastern portion of the state, on which he and his sons built many plantations. Her family's wealth was inherited by her grandmother Frances Pollock, the last remaining kin to Thomas Pollock. Frances married John Devereux in New Bern before moving to Raleigh. Her paternal great-grandfather was Jonathon Edwards, theologian and president of Princeton University. On her mother's side, she was descended from Samuel Johnson, another early American clergyman and educator who was the first president of King's College (today Columbia University).

Clarke's mother died when she was nine years old, leaving her to be raised by her father. Being a Yale graduate and lawyer, her father ensured each of his children received an education. Clarke was paired with a governess who followed the course of study offered at Princeton and Yale. She was particularly interested in learning other languages, notably German, French, Spanish, and Italian, and practiced translating their literature into English.

Clarke traveled extensively in her early years. Before turning 20, she had lived in the West Indies and Texas. When visiting her uncle, Bishop Leonidas Polk, in Louisiana, Clarke became reacquainted with a childhood friend, Major William John Clarke. He was veteran of the Mexican–American War and made his living on a sugar plantation in Louisiana. The two were married on April 6, 1848, by her uncle. The couple lived in Louisiana for a few more years before returning to North Carolina and settling in Raleigh.

== Writing career ==
Clarke was a writer from a young age. In fact, her sister saved some of her letters from the 1830s because she was appreciative of her writing. Her family valued her education and encouraged her to continue writing as she grew up. Clarke first gained prominence for her work as an editor. She wrote book reviews for publishers and compiled tomes of other writers' poetry. Clarke's career was varied, as she contributed to a number of magazines, books, collections of poetry, and other pieces of literature. She was an editor of Southern Field and Fireside in 1865, a writer for Peterson's Magazine, and a contributor for The Old Guard and Demorest's Monthly. Another of her notable works was her translation of French poet Victor Hugo’s works into English.

Using pseudonyms, Clarke began her own career as a poet. One of her first works Woods-Note, also known as Carolina Carols: A Collection of North Carolina Poetry, was published in 1854 and gained significant recognition. This was a compilation of the works of many people, however six of her own poems were included in the two-volume anthology. Her newfound recognition resulted in her being published in both newspapers and magazines. Clarke refused to allow her career to be confined by the typical restraints women experienced in this time period, and her husband was very supportive in this process.

In 1866, W.M P. Smith and Company published her first book of poems titled “Mosses From a Rolling Stone; Or, Idle Moments of a Busy Woman”. In 1871, E.P. Dutton and Company published her second and final book titled “Clytie and Zenobia; Or, The Lily and the Palm, a Poem”.

== Later life ==
Between 1849 and 1858, Clarke had four children while developing her career. By 1853, she had established herself as a prominent writer in North Carolina, and compiled her famous Wood Notes in the following years. She continued her writing career while traveling to Texas, Florida, Cuba, and the West Indies.

The American Civil War had harsh effects on the Clarke family. William Clarke joined the Confederate Army and was captured and held prisoner in Fort Delaware. He never completely recovered from the injuries and illnesses he sustained during the war, and brought back heavy burdens to the Clarke household. He later developed a drinking problem that remained with him for the rest of his life. He managed to set up his law firm in New Bern and eventually became a judge, but was consistently unable to earn a sizable income due to his drinking.

Clarke would continue to support her husband's dwindling income through her writing career for the rest of their lives. Her health began to deteriorate in the 1880s. Clarke suffered a stroke in 1883, which resulted in permanent paralysis of part of her body. Her husband died in January 1886. Clarke began to rapidly fade after his death, and suffered a second stroke on March 3. On March 30, 1886, she died and was buried in New Bern.

== Legacy ==
Clarke did not conform to the typical expectations of a southern wife and mother in her era. She wrote poetry and appeared in news articles while raising her children- a feat practically unheard of among her peers. Clarke gained recognition for many of her smaller texts, but her most well-known work is Wood Notes, also known as Carolina Carols: A Collection of North Carolina Poetry. Although the collection was mostly of her own writing, some of the poems were other members of North Carolina society, and this work came to represent the society as a whole, for it included the voices of men, women, chief justices, congressmen, lawyers, and teachers. Furthermore, she gained recognition for her satirical political stories during the time of radical reconstruction.
