= William Henry Washington =

American politician

Member of the U.S. House of Representatives from North Carolina's 4th district
- In office March 4, 1841 – March 3, 1843
- Preceded by: Charles Biddle Shepard
- Succeeded by: Edmund Deberry

Personal details
- Born: William Henry Washington; February 7, 1813 Goldsboro, North Carolina, U.S.
- Died: August 12, 1860 (aged 47) New Bern, North Carolina, U.S.
- Party: Whig Party
- Education: Yale College

William Henry Washington (February 7, 1813 – August 12, 1860) was a Whig U.S. Congressman from North Carolina between 1841 and 1843.

Born near Goldsboro, North Carolina, he graduated from Yale College in 1834, where he was a member of Skull and Bones. He then studied law and was admitted to the bar in 1835. Washington practiced law in New Bern. He was elected as a Whig to the 27th United States Congress in 1840, and served a single term before declining re-election.

Following his term in Congress, Washington served in the North Carolina House of Commons in 1843 and 1846 and in the North Carolina Senate in 1848, 1850, and 1852. After his time in politics, he returned to law and died in New Bern in 1860.

U.S. House of Representatives
Preceded by Charles B. Shepard	Member of the U.S. House of Representatives from North Carolina's 4th congressional district 1841–1843	Succeeded by Edmund Deberry
