= Albert G. Brown =

American politician (1813–1880)

Albert Brown
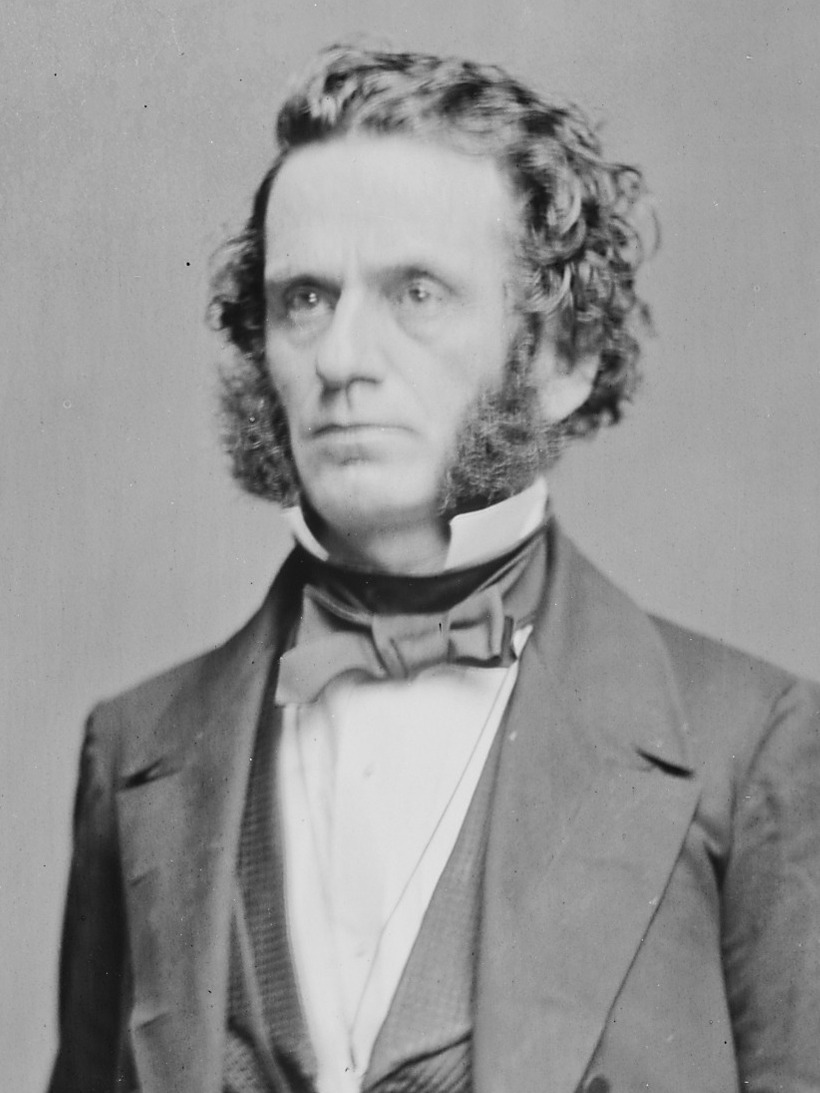
- Brown, c. 1860–1865

Confederate States Senator from Mississippi
- In office February 18, 1862 – May 10, 1865
- Preceded by: Constituency established
- Succeeded by: Constituency abolished

United States Senator from Mississippi
- In office January 7, 1854 – January 12, 1861
- Preceded by: Walker Brooke
- Succeeded by: Hiram Revels

Member of the U.S. House of Representatives from Mississippi's 4th district
- In office March 4, 1847 – March 3, 1853
- Preceded by: District created
- Succeeded by: Wiley P. Harris

14th Governor of Mississippi
- In office January 10, 1844 – January 10, 1848
- Preceded by: Tilghman Tucker
- Succeeded by: Joseph Matthews

Member of the U.S. House of Representatives from Mississippi's at-large district
- In office March 4, 1839 – March 3, 1841
- Preceded by: Thomas J. Word
- Succeeded by: William M. Gwin

Personal details
- Born: May 31, 1813 Chester County, South Carolina, U.S.
- Died: June 12, 1880 (aged 67) Terry, Mississippi, U.S.
- Party: Democratic
- Education: Mississippi College; Jefferson College, Mississippi

Military service
- Allegiance: Confederate States of America
- Branch/service: Confederate States Army
- Years of service: 1861-1862
- Rank: Captain
- Unit: 18th Mississippi Infantry
- Battles/wars: American Civil War

Albert Gallatin Brown (May 31, 1813 – June 12, 1880) was Governor of Mississippi from 1844 to 1848 and a Democratic United States senator from 1854 to 1861, when he withdrew during the secession crisis. A prominent Fire-Eater and advocate for the expansion of slavery, Brown served as a Confederate senator for Mississippi in the Confederate States Congress, then retired from public life after the American Civil War.

== Early life ==
He was born to Joseph and Elizabeth (Rice) Brown, a poor family of hog farmers, in the Chester District of South Carolina, at the foothills of the Appalachian Mountains in 1813. The family were farmers originally from Charlotte County, Virginia, from where Brown's grandfather had moved to South Carolina in the 1770s. The family can be tracked to Lincolnshire, England from where the first Brown ancestor arrived in Virginia in 1697, and moved to Charlotte County in the 1720s In 1823, when he was only 10 years old his family moved to the new state of Mississippi. The Brown family settled Copiah County, south of the state capital, Jackson. Raising cotton in the new frontier state proved to be lucrative for the Brown family. In 1824, just one year after settling in Mississippi, Joseph Brown was elected Justice of the Peace in Copiah County. By 1825, two years after arriving in Mississippi, he was the third-largest taxpayer in the county, owning 18 slaves. By 1832, he was farming a plantation of 1,600 acres and owned 23 slaves.

In 1829, Albert Brown entered Mississippi College, but he soon transferred to Jefferson College, which he attended for about six months.

== Political career ==
During his lifetime, Brown was one of the most popular and the most influential men in Mississippi. He is considered to be the father of the public school system and of the University of Mississippi. His rhetorical attacks on illiteracy are considered to have made a substantial contribution to the cause of education in Mississippi.

He was also a Fire-Eater and a strong advocate for the expansion of slavery. In 1858, he said: "I want a foothold in Central America... because I want to plant slavery there.... I want Cuba,... Tamaulipas, Potosi, and one or two other Mexican States; and I want them all for the same reason - for the planting or spreading of slavery." Indeed, he went on to say, "I would spread the blessings of slavery, like the religion of our Divine Master, to the uttermost ends of the earth."

To those who agreed with such views, "Albert Gallatin Brown possessed magical powers. With many learnt spells, handsome countenance surrounded by a luxuriant, flowing beard and dark-curly hair, in every sense he looked distinguished. Courageous, he was void of vanity; animated, he was persuasive; his spirit, crackerish to the extreme." Reuben Davis, who knew him well, states in his book Reminiscences on Mississippi and Mississippians that Brown "was the best-balanced man I ever knew.... In politics, he had strategy with-out corruption, and handled all his opponents with skill but never descended to intrigue."

Brown began his political career in the Mississippi Legislature, winning an election in 1835 to represent Copiah County and serving as House speaker pro tempore. Brown then ran as a Democrat to represent Mississippi's single at-large district in the US House of Representatives, winning the seat in 1839. He declined to run for reelection to Congress and was elected as a circuit judge in 1841. He was elected governor of Mississippi in 1843, defeating his Whig opponent by a margin of nearly 10%, and winning reelection by a landslide in the 1845 election. Prevented by term limits from running for Governor again, he won an 1847 election to represent Mississippi's 4th congressional district. When one of Mississippi's US Senate seats became vacant in 1854, Brown's loyalists in the state legislature voted for him to become senator. Re-elected to the Senate in 1859, he then withdrew following Mississippi's secession from the United States in January, 1861.

At the start of the Civil War Brown raised a company of volunteer infantry, which entered service as Company H of the 18th Mississippi Infantry Regiment. Governor John J. Pettus offered Brown a position as a general in Mississippi's state army, but he declined, instead joining his regiment in Virginia as captain of the Confederate company he had recruited.

Brown left the army in 1862 when he was elected to serve as one of Mississippi's senators in the Confederate States Congress. He was reelected to that position and served in the Confederate Senate until the end of the war. During Reconstruction he advocated for reconciliation, which made him unpopular in his home state. Brown never resumed public office following the war.

== Personal life ==
Brown's first wife was Elizabeth Frances Thornton Taliaferro (1817–1836) of Virginia, who died about five months after the marriage. She was the daughter of Richard Henry Taliaferro, Sr. (1783–1830) and Frances Walker Gilmer (ca. 1784-1826).

Brown's second wife was Roberta Eugenia Young (1813–1886), daughter of Brig. Gen. Robert Young (1768–1824) and Elizabeth Mary Conrad (1772–1810). Roberta's older sister was Elizabeth Mary Young (1804–1859), the wife of Philip Richard Fendall II (1794–1867), the District Attorney of the District of Columbia.

== Death ==
Overcome by a stroke of apoplexy, Brown fell face down in a shallow pond at his home near Terry in 1880. His last remains rest in Greenwood Cemetery, Jackson.

== Legacy ==
Brown was a slaveholder. In Incidents in the Life of a Slave Girl, a narrative written by the escaped slave Harriet Jacobs, Brown is called out by Jacobs for supporting slavery in a speech to Congress despite the fact that he "could not be ignorant of [the wrongdoings perpetrated against slaves], for they are of frequent occurrence in every Southern State."

Brown County, Kansas, is named after him.

== In popular culture ==
In the 1992 alternate history/science fiction novel The Guns of the South by Harry Turtledove, Brown is an important supporting character.

== Sources ==
- Ranck, James Byrne (1974). Albert Gallatin Brown: Radical Southern Nationalist. Philadelphia: Porcupine Press. ISBN 978-0879913472.
- United States Congress. "Albert G. Brown (id: B000900)". Biographical Directory of the United States Congress.

Party political offices
Preceded by Tilghman Tucker	Democratic nominee for Governor of Mississippi; 1843, 1845	Succeeded by Joseph W. Matthews
U.S. House of Representatives
Preceded by Thomas J. Word	Member of the U.S. House of Representatives from Mississippi's at-large congressional district 1839 – 1841	Succeeded by William M. Gwin
Preceded by District created	Member of the U.S. House of Representatives from Mississippi's 4th congressional district 1847–1853	Succeeded by Wiley P. Harris
Political offices
Preceded by Tilghman Tucker	Governor of Mississippi; 1844–1848	Succeeded by Joseph Matthews
U.S. Senate
Preceded by Walker Brooke	United States Senator (Class 2) from Mississippi; 1854–1861; Served alongside: Stephen Adams, Jefferson Davis	Succeeded by Hiram Revels^{(1)}
Confederate States Senate
New constituency	Confederate States Senator (Class 2) from Mississippi; 1862–1865; Served alongside: James Phelan, John Watson	Constituency abolished
Notes and references
1. Because of Mississippi's secession, the Senate seat was vacant for nine years before Revels succeeded Brown.
